= Area codes 662 and 471 =

Telephone area code for the northern half of Mississippi, US

Numbering plan areas of Mississippi

Area codes 662 and 471 are telephone area codes in the North American Numbering Plan (NANP) for the northern half of the U.S. state of Mississippi, including the six counties (Benton, Coahoma, Desoto, Marshall, Tate, and Tunica) that are part of the Memphis metro area. The numbering plan area (NPA) also includes the cities that are home to the state's two largest universities, Oxford (University of Mississippi or "Ole Miss") and Starkville (Mississippi State University). The NPA was first created with area code 662 in 1999 in an area code split of 601 and was converted to an overlay complex with new area code 471 in 2026.

== History ==
When the American Telephone and Telegraph Company (AT&T) created the original North American area codes for the first continental telephone numbering plan in North American, the entire state of Mississippi was a single numbering plan area (NPA), assigned area code 601.

Prior to October 2021, area code 662 had telephone numbers assigned for the central office code 988. In 2020, 988 was designated nationwide as a dialing code for the National Suicide Prevention Lifeline, which created a conflict for exchanges that permit seven-digit dialing. This area code was therefore scheduled to transition to ten-digit dialing by October 24, 2021.

In 2023, the NANP Administrator projected that northern Mississippi will approach exhaustion of central office prefixes in 662 and require relief action by early 2026. An overlay complex with area code 471 was approved, with network preparation and customer education beginning on April 30, 2025. The in-service date was January 30, 2026.

== Service area ==
The numbering plan area includes the following cities and towns:

- Aberdeen
- Ackerman
- Amory
- Artesia
- Baldwyn
- Batesville
- Belmont
- Belzoni
- Booneville
- Byhalia
- Calhoun City
- Carrollton
- Clarksdale
- Cleveland
- Coffeeville
- Coldwater
- Columbus
- Como
- Corinth
- Crawford
- Drew
- Durant
- Eupora
- French Camp
- Fulton
- Greenville
- Greenwood
- Grenada
- Hernando
- Hollandale
- Holly Springs
- Horn Lake
- Houston
- Indianola
- Iuka
- Kosciusko
- Lexington
- Louisville
- Macon
- Marks
- Mound Bayou
- New Albany
- Okolona
- Olive Branch
- Oxford
- Pontotoc
- Potts Camp
- Rosedale
- Ruleville
- Saltillo
- Senatobia
- Southaven
- Smithville
- Starkville
- Tchula
- Tishomingo
- Tunica
- Tupelo
- Vaiden
- Water Valley
- West Point
- Winona
- Yazoo City

== In popular culture ==
Blues guitarist Christone "Kingfish" Ingram, who is from Clarksdale, named his second album and its title track "662" after his home area code.

== See also ==
- List of Mississippi area codes
- List of North American Numbering Plan area codes

Mississippi area codes: 228, 601/769, 471/662
	North: 731, 901	
West: 318/457, 327/870	471/662	East: 205/659, 256/938
	South: 601/769	
Alabama area codes: 205/659, 251, 256/938, 334
Arkansas area codes: 479, 501, 870/327
Louisiana area codes: 225, 318/457, 337, 504, 985
Tennessee area codes: 423, 615/629, 731, 865, 901, 931
