= Area code 228 =

Telephone area code in Southern Mississippi

Coordinates: 30°27′11″N 88°53′46″W

Numbering plan areas and area codes of Mississippi

Area code 228 is the telephone area code in the North American Numbering Plan (NANP) for the Gulf Coast in the U.S. state of Mississippi, serving the three counties in the state's southeastern tip: Hancock, Harrison, and Jackson. It was the second area code created in the state, when in 1997, the numbering plan area was split from the original, state-wide area code 601. Area code 601 was further reduced in size when area code 662 was created in 1999 for the northern half of Mississippi.

Exhaustion analysis of this small numbering plan area shows that exhaustion is unlikely for the foreseeable future.

== Service area ==
The service area includes the following cities:

- Bay St. Louis
- Biloxi
- D'Iberville
- Diamondhead
- Gautier
- Gulfport
- Long Beach
- Moss Point
- Ocean Springs
- Pascagoula
- Pass Christian
- Vancleave
- Waveland

== See also ==
- List of Mississippi area codes
- List of North American Numbering Plan area codes

Mississippi area codes: 228, 601/769, 471/662
	North: 601/769	
West: 985	228	East: 251
	South: Gulf of Mexico	
Alabama area codes: 205/659, 251, 256/938, 334
Louisiana area codes: 225, 318/457, 337, 504, 985
