= Area codes 601 and 769 =

Area codes in Mississippi, United States

Coordinates: 31.818143°N 89.751786°W

Numbering plan areas of Mississippi

Area codes 601 and 769 are telephone area codes in the North American Numbering Plan (NANP) for central and southern Mississippi, excluding the three counties of the Gulf Coast.

Area code 601 was one of the original North American area codes assigned in 1947. Until 1997, it served the entire state of Mississippi.

Despite the state's relatively stagnant population growth, 601 was close to exhaustion by the mid-1990s due to the proliferation of cell phones and pagers. In 1997, the far southeastern tip of the state, including Biloxi and the Gulf Coast, was split off with area code 228. In 1999, area code 662 was created in the northern half of Mississippi, including the Mississippi side of the Memphis area.

The 1999 split was intended as a long-term solution, but within five years, 601 was close to exhaustion due to the proliferation of cell phones, particularly in the Jackson area. On March 14, 2005, Mississippi's first overlay complex was created when 769 was approved as the second area code for the 601 numbering plan area. Ten-digit dialing became mandatory in central Mississippi.

== Service area ==
The numbering plan area includes the following cities:

- Bolton
- Brandon
- Braxton
- Brookhaven
- Byram
- Canton
- Carthage
- Clinton
- Columbia
- Conehatta
- Crystal Springs
- Decatur
- Edwards
- Florence
- Flowood
- Forest
- Gluckstadt
- Hattiesburg
- Hazlehurst
- Jackson
- Laurel
- Lucedale
- Lumberton
- Madison
- Magee
- Magnolia
- McComb
- Mendenhall
- Meridian
- Monticello
- Mount Olive
- Morton
- Natchez
- Newton
- Ovett
- Pearl
- Pelahatchie
- Petal
- Philadelphia
- Picayune
- Poplarville
- Port Gibson
- Prentiss
- Puckett
- Purvis
- Quitman
- Raleigh
- Raymond
- Richland
- Ridgeland
- Terry
- Tylertown
- Utica
- Vicksburg
- Washington
- Waynesboro
- Wesson
- Wiggins

== See also ==
- List of Mississippi area codes
- List of North American Numbering Plan area codes

Mississippi area codes: 228, 601/769, 471/662
| | North: 471/662 | |
| West: 318/457 | 601/769 | East: 205/659, 251 |
| | South: 225, 228, 985 | |
Alabama area codes: 205/659, 251, 256/938, 334
Louisiana area codes: 225, 318/457, 337, 504, 985
