= History of telephone numbers in the United Kingdom =

Telephone numbers in the United Kingdom have a flexible structure that reflects their historical demands, starting from many independent companies through a nationalised near-monopoly, to a system that supports many different services, including cellular phones, which were not envisaged when the system was first built. Numbers evolved in a piecemeal fashion, with numbers initially allocated on an exchange-by-exchange basis for calls connected by manual operators. Subscriber numbers reflected demand in each area, with single digit telephone numbers in very rural areas and longer numbers in cities.

Beginning with London's director system, a need to automate telephone dialling resulted in every exchange being allocated either a unique Subscriber Trunk Dialling (STD) code or unique range of numbers within a wider dialling code area. For many years, calls dialled between nearby exchanges often required 'local codes' to select the most direct call route, rather than dialling the STD codes.

Demand for telephone lines has grown and exchanges have been modernised, so many subscriber numbers have been lengthened and highly localised STD codes have been rationalised into wider area codes. Such was the demand for lines in London that the city's telephone area was first split into two separate dialling codes, before being merged again with a short dialling code and long subscriber numbers. Meanwhile, a need to find numbers for special services, such as mobile telephones and information services, initially led to confusion with traditional telephone numbers.

From 1995, extensive renumbering exercises have led to specific number ranges being allocated to distinguish between traditional 'geographic' telephone numbers, mobile numbers and special services. Despite these rationalisations, there remains no standard format or length for a UK area code or telephone number, and there are misunderstandings in code areas which have seen alterations to customers' individual telephone numbers.

== Origins ==
The telephone service in the United Kingdom was originally provided by private companies and local councils. But by 1912–13 all except the telephone service of Kingston upon Hull and Guernsey had been bought out by the Post Office. The Post Office also operated telephone services in Jersey until 1923 and the Isle of Man until 1969 when the islands took over responsibility for their own postal and telephone services – although the Isle of Man system remained part of British Telecom until 1987.

Post Office Telecommunications was reorganised in 1980–81 as British Telecommunications (British Telecom, or BT), and was the first major nationalised industry to be privatised by the Conservative government. The Hull Telephone Department was itself reconstituted as Kingston Communications, in 1987; it was sold by Hull City Council in the late 1990s and celebrated its centenary in 2004.

== Subscriber numbers ==
From the introduction of the telephone in the late 1870s, to the early 1990s, telephone numbers in most of the United Kingdom were usually shown with a written exchange name followed by the subscriber number, e.g. 'Mallaig 10' or 'Aberdeen 43342'. This allowed calls to be placed initially through the operator and later by using local or national dialling codes. Exchange names were usually closely tied to the physical location of telephone exchanges, being either the name of a city, town or village or district.

The length of early telephone numbers depended on the number of subscribers attached to a particular exchange: if there were fewer than 10 subscribers, a single digit sufficed. One single-digit number survived in Rèinigeadal, Scotland until 1990. Two-digit numbers were sufficient on small exchanges with fewer than 100 subscribers, while exchanges with a few hundred lines used three-digit subscriber numbers, e.g. 200–499. Larger exchanges which covered thousands of lines used four-digit subscriber numbers, e.g. 2000–5999, or five-digit subscriber numbers, e.g. 20000–49999.

As demand for telephones grew, more telephone numbers were required. This would often see an exchange with existing three-digit numbers open one or more new ranges with four-digit local numbers (e.g. 5000-6999), and exchanges with existing four-digit numbers open one or more new ranges with five-digit local numbers (e.g. 60000–69999). This piecemeal approach lasted until the 1980s when a shortage of numbers resulted in an overhaul of dialling codes and subscriber numbers.

As of 2020, 52 exchanges still have five-digit subscriber numbers of which a dozen places also have unusually long STD codes. One area with a long STD code retains four-digit local numbering (see Telephone Numbers in the United Kingdom for examples).

== Director system ==
In November 1922 the General Post Office decided to adopt the Strowger system after trialling several automatic exchange systems; initially for small and medium towns and cities in Britain. But for London this required development of the Director telephone system by the Automatic Telephone Manufacturing Company (ATM) to enable operation with a mixture of both automatic and manual local exchanges in the London area for several decades. A demonstration model of a "Director" exchange was shown by the developer ATM of Liverpool as part of the Post Office exhibits at the British Empire Exhibition at Wembley in 1924 and 1925. However, it was not until 1927 that the first "Director" telephone exchange was brought into service in Holborn, London and rolled out progressively across Greater London. Letters were assigned to each number from 2 to 0 on the telephone dial—in a different scheme than that currently used—and a three-digit code, represented by letters, identified the local exchange. Telephone numbers were displayed preceded by the exchange name, with the first three letters highlighted to indicate the code, and number, such as WHItehall 1212.

Director schemes were gradually introduced in other major cities, Birmingham, Edinburgh, Glasgow, Liverpool and Manchester.

== Introduction of area codes and local dialling codes in non-director areas ==
Following successful trials of Rural Automatic Exchanges (RAX) from 1921, standardised automatic exchanges were gradually introduced to smaller towns and rural areas. Each RAX was connected to a 'parent' exchange in a larger town. At first, RAX exchanges only allowed subscribers to dial numbers on the same exchange: for numbers on other exchanges, subscribers had to dial '0' (or occasionally '01') to call an operator at a manual switchboard in the parent exchange. Later RAX exchanges introduced direct dialling to parent automatic exchanges by dialling '9' followed by the subscriber number, and direct connections to manual operators at other nearby exchanges by dialling 6, 7 or 8. This set the pattern for later local codes.

'Large multichange exchange areas' were developed from 1925 to allow several 'satellite' exchanges within provincial cities to be connected to a main exchange, using different number ranges for each exchange without separate dialling codes. This has become known as a linked numbering scheme.

The installation of Unit Automatic Exchanges (UAX) from 1937 introduced local dialling codes for the first time outside the Director areas: subscribers could now directly dial calls to and from nearby automatic exchanges using short dialling codes. Unlike Director codes or modern dialling codes, the code for a specific destination would vary from exchange to exchange: for example, the local code for Totnes was 997 from Bigbury, but 882 from Blackawton and 86 from Paignton. Trunk calls (long-distance calls beyond the local call charging area) still required connection by an operator.

== Introduction of STD codes ==
Subscriber Trunk Dialling (STD) was introduced in 1958 to allow subscribers to dial trunk calls without operator assistance. Uniform exchange codes, usually called STD codes, were allocated for every exchange in the country progressively as STD was rolled out. This process was not completed until 1979.

=== Change to Operator number ===
In order to allow STD codes to begin with a uniform '0', the number used to call the operator was changed from '0' to '100' as STD was rolled out.

=== STD codes for director areas ===
The existing director areas were allocated a short area code, usually in the form 0x1 (01 for London). These were:

Area code	City	Notes
01	London	Until 1990—see below
021	Birmingham	(2 = B)
031	Edinburgh	(3 = E)
041	Glasgow	(4 = G)
051	Liverpool	(5 = L)
061	Manchester	(6 = M)

The codes 071, 081, and 091 were reserved for later expansion, with 071 being planned for Sheffield (7 = S). The former two were eventually temporarily allocated to London (see below).

Within the director areas, the first three digits of the seven digit subscriber number would relate to the local telephone exchange on which the number could be found. Before all-figure dialling, these were usually three-digit letter codes, based on the first three letters of the exchange name. For example, within the Liverpool director area, a number on the Anfield telephone exchange would be dialled as ANField xxxx and the number would be dialled by STD as 051 ANF xxxx. After the advent of all-figure dialling the number would be 051 263 xxxx.

=== Creation and numbering of new STD code groups ===
Nearly 6000 exchanges needed to be assigned STD codes. In order to simplify the numbering, and to allow for future consolidation, exchanges were linked into just over 700 charge groups. Each charge group was assigned to a Group Switching Centre (which might handle more than one charge group) and allocated a four digit code. Where a town had its own GSC, the four digit code served as the STD code for this 'core' town. Smaller 'ring' or satellite exchanges in each group were initially assigned individual dialling codes based on the charge group's code.

The original concept was for there to be a nationwide Director system, and in common with the Director system, Group Switching Centres were originally based in major towns and assigned codes based on two letters of the respective place's name and the corresponding numbers on a telephone dial. The letters and numbers originally corresponded as follows on a UK telephone (note that US and modern UK telephones use a different allocation of letters to numbers):

1	2	3	4	5	6	7	8	9	0
	ABC	DEF	GHI	JKL	MN	PRS	TUV	WXY	O

For example Aylesbury was given the STD code 0AY6, where the letter A can be found on the number 2 and the letter Y on the number 9. The letter O became a zero, such as for Bournemouth: 0BO2 where BO = 20. To help the public remember the new codes they were initially advertised using this alphanumeric combination of 0 followed by two letters and at least one number. From 1966 all STD codes were displayed as numbers only.

Originally, where a place's name began with the letter "O" the code would begin with two zeros, such as Oxford: 0OX2 where OX = 09. These codes starting with "00" were later reallocated, freeing the prefix 00 for use by calls to the Republic of Ireland, to radiophones and to premium rate numbers.

=== Dialling within STD exchange groups and conversion to linked numbering areas ===
Some charge groups used a single STD code and then used distinct subscriber number ranges to route calls to the correct local exchange, such as 2xxxx for numbers on one exchange and 5xxxx for numbers on another, known as a linked numbering scheme. However, in most areas further codes were needed to route calls to the correct exchange within the charge group both for STD and local calls. Different codes were used for STD and local dialling. Because of this, telephone numbers were usually still stated with the exchange name and subscriber number, e.g. 'Blackawton 299', to allow callers to look up the appropriate code for their call.

==== Local dialling codes ====
Dialling codes were already in use before the introduction of STD to allow customers to dial from one local exchange to another within a limited area, and these were retained to allow local calls to be dialled without the need to dial the full STD code. This also enabled local calls to be charged at a lower rate, and avoid the higher 'STD' call rates that were based on distance. Now known as 'local codes', these often began with a 9 for calls routed through a parent exchange and 6, 7 or 8 for calls routed through an adjacent exchange. The local code was typically only one, two or three digits, but might be even longer than the STD code if the call was routed through an intermediate exchange. Local codes were in use in some areas until the 1990s.

==== STD group code ranges including satellite STD codes ====
Each Group Switching Centre was based in the exchange of a main town, with a four-digit STD code assigned to this 'core' exchange. Digits from the main town's local codes were often added to the end of the core exchange's STD code in order to provide a unique STD code for each 'ring' or satellite exchange. In written form these STD codes were split after the third digit to highlight this satellite exchange numbering. In many cases the local codes were later incorporated in the subscriber numbers to form longer numbers as part of the main exchange's linked numbering scheme.

A simple example is St Helens, which had two satellite exchanges: Rainford and Billinge. The STD codes for Rainford and Billinge combined the STD code for St Helens and the local dialling codes, which were later included in the subscriber numbers.

Original STD code and number format	Exchange	Local dialling from St Helens	Modern area code and number format
(0744) xxxxx	St Helens	xxxxx	(01744) xxxxxx
(074 488) xxxx	Rainford	88 xxxx	(01744) 88xxxx
(074 489) xxxx	Billinge	89 xxxx	(01744) 89xxxx

==== Charging areas without a 'core' code ====
Where a charging group did not have its own Group Switching Centre, but was instead controlled by a GSC in a nearby charging group, there might not be a 'core' exchange on which to base STD codes. A code was chosen based on a town (not necessarily the most important), district or geographical feature in the area, such as 0BL8 (BLandford area), 0GI9 (Stowmarket area, named after the tiny village of GIpping), 0DN3 (Crediton area, taken from DevoN) and 0TV7 (Aberfeldy and Strathtay area, taken from Tay Valley).

For example, the Newton Abbot GSC controlled an Adjacent Charge Group around the southern part of Dartmoor with no 'core' exchange, and all the STD codes in the group were five digits long based on code 0DN4 (0364). All the exchanges are now incorporated into a linked numbering scheme on the 01364 area code, officially assigned to Ashburton.

Original STD code and number format	Exchange	Local dialling from Newton Abbot	Modern area code and number format
(036 42) xxx	Widecombe-in-the-Moor	912 xxx	(01364) 621xxx
(036 43) xxx	Poundsgate	913 xxx	(01364) 631xxx
(036 44) xxxx	Buckfastleigh	914 xxxx	(01364) 64xxxx
(036 45) xxxx	Ashburton	915 xxxx	(01364) 65xxxx
(036 46) xxx	Haytor	916 xxx	(01364) 661xxx
(036 47) xxxx	South Brent	917 xxxx	(01364) 7xxxx

==== Secondary STD code ranges for satellite exchanges ====
In some charge groups with a large number of satellite exchanges, a separate STD code range was used for a ring of satellites and this led to even more complex numbering relationships.

For example, the Torquay charge group was issued with two STD code ranges: 0803 (0TO3) and 0804 (0TO4). The 'core' code of 0803 was allocated to a five-figure linked numbering scheme covering exchanges in Torquay (numbers starting with 2, 3 and 6) and Paignton (numbers starting with 4 or 5). 0804 was then introduced to cover a ring of 13 smaller satellite exchanges outside Torbay with subscriber numbers starting at 2xx or 2xxx on each exchange. Subscribers on the 0803 exchanges dialled local codes beginning 8 to call numbers on the 0804 satellites; for example, a local code of 822 was used to dial from Torquay to Dittisham, whose STD code was 080 422. Meanwhile, subscribers on 0804 satellite exchanges used a mixture of codes beginning 8 to route calls on direct paths to nearby exchanges, and codes beginning 9 to route calls to and through the main 0803 exchanges. As exchanges in the Torquay charging area were gradually modernised and moved to the (0803) linked numbering scheme, those with four-figure subscriber numbers had the Torquay local codes added as the first two digits of six-digit subscriber numbers, e.g. Totnes (080 46) 2125 − which had been locally dialled as 86 2125 from Torquay − became (0803) 862125. Exchanges in this area with three-figure numbers were given completely new number ranges, usually incorporating only the last digit of the old STD code, e.g. Blackawton (080 421) 299 became (0803) 712 299.

Original STD code and number format	Exchange	Local dialling from Torquay	Local dialling from Blackawton (Note: These codes changed as exchanges were modernised. For example, the local code for Dittisham is routed via Dartmouth and was 9822 by 1993, reflecting Dartmouth's move to the 0803 group.)	Modern area code and number format
(0803) xxxxx (subscriber numbers beginning 2, 3 and 6)	Torquay	xxxxx	9 xxxxx	(01803) xxxxxx
(0803) xxxxx (subscriber numbers beginning 4 and 5)	Paignton	xxxxx	9 xxxxx	(01803) xxxxxx
(080 421) xxx	Blackawton	821 xxx	xxx	(01803) 712xxx
(080 422) xxx	Dittisham	822 xxx	888 xxx	(01803) 722xxx
(080 423) xxx	Harbertonford	823 xxx	9823 xxx	(01803) 732xxx
(080 424) xxx	Ipplepen	824 xxx	9824 xxx	(01803) 81xxxx (Note: Ipplepen's numbering was detached from the original STD and local codes when it was moved onto the 0803 linked numbering scheme in the 1970s, two decades before the remaining 080 42x exchanges.)
(080 425) xxx	Kingswear	825 xxx	887 xxx	(01803) 752xxx
(080 426) xxx	Staverton	826 xxx	9826 xxx	(01803) 762xxx
(080 427) xxx	Stoke Fleming	827 xxx	886 xxx	(01803) 772xxx
(080 428) xxx	Stoke Gabriel	828 xxx	9828 xxx	(01803) 782xxx
(080 43) xxxx	Dartmouth	83 (Note: Replacing earlier local code 60.) xxxx	8 xxxx	(01803) 83xxxx
(080 44) xxxx	Churston	84 xxxx	984 xxxx	(01803) 84xxxx
(080 45) xxxx	Brixham	85 (Note: Replacing earlier local code 66.) xxxx	884 xxxx	(01803) 85xxxx
(080 46) xxxx	Totnes	86 xxxx	882 xxxx	(01803) 86xxxx
(080 47) xxxx	Kingskerswell	87 (Note: Replacing earlier local code 68.) xxxx	987 xxxx	(01803) 87xxxx

Just as modernisation of Torquay's area has seen 14 STD codes merged into one, the move to linked numbering areas across the country has led to about 5,600 remaining exchanges being covered by 658 dialling codes, and local codes no longer exist.

=== 1968 area code changes ===
In 1968, area codes beginning 00 were changed.

New area code (1968 onwards)	Area code name	Old area code (pre-1968)	
0301	Arrochar	0022 (OC)	Arrochar & Lochgoilhead, Dunbarton
0572	Oakham	0023 (OA)	Oakham (Rutland), Leics.
0631	Oban	0024 (OB)	Oban, Argyll
0651	Oldmeldrum	0055 (OL)	Newmachar & Oldmeldrum, Aberdeenshire.
0656	Bridgend, Ogmore Vale	0042 (OG)	Ogmore, Bridgend, Mid Glam
0662	Omagh	0063 (OM)	Omagh, Tyrone, Northern Ireland
0689	Orpington (68 = OT)	0072 (OR)	Orpington & Farnborough, Kent
0691	Oswestry (69 = OW)	0073 (OS)	Oswestry, Salop
0695	Ormskirk	0074 (OR)	Ormskirk, Lancs
0801	Thrapston, Oundle	0085 (OU)	Thrapston, Northants
0830	Kirkwhelpington, Otterburn	0086 (OT)	Otterburn, Northumberland
0832	Clopton, Oundle	0082 (OU)	Oundle, Northants
0837	Okehampton	0052 (OK)	Okehampton, Devon
0850	Callanish, Lewis, Outer Hebrides	0040 (OH)	Lewis, Hebrides
		0044 ()	Isle of Lewis, Hebrides
0851		0044 ()	Stornoway
0851	Great Bernera and Stornoway, Outer Hebrides	0041 (OH)	
0852	Kilmelford, Oban	0025 (OB)	
0852	Kilmelford	0026 (OB)	Kilmelford group
		0027 (OB)	Kilmelford, Argyll (Oban)
0855	Ballachulish, Onich	0062 (ON)	Ballachulish Group
		0062 ()	Kinlochleven & Fort William, Argyll
-	no replacement	0075 (OR)	Ormskirk, Lancs, outer areas
0856	Orkney	0076 (OR)	Orkney Islands (Kirkwall)
0857	Sanday, Orkney	0077 (OR)	Orkney Islands (Eday, N. Orkney)
-	no replacement	0078 (OR)	Orkney Islands (Kirkwall)
0859	Harris, Outer Hebrides	0046 (OH)	
0865	Oxford (86 = UN[iversity])	0092 (OX)	Oxford
0866	Kilchrenan, Oban	0025 (OB)	
		0025 ()	Taynuilt, Argyll
0867	Oxford	0096 (OX)	Oxford, outer areas
0869	Bicester, Oxfordshire	0095 (OX)	Bicester, Oxon
0870	Isle of Benbecula, Outer Hebrides	0047 (OH)	Barra or Benbecula, Hebrides
0871	Castlebay, Outer Hebrides	0047 (OH)	(Isle of Barra Group)
0876	Lochmaddy, Outer Hebrides	0047 (OH)	
0878	Lochboisdale, Outer Hebrides	0047 (OH)	
0883	Caterham, Oxted	0093 (OX)	Oxted, Caterham, Surrey
0959	Westerham, Otford	0083 (OT)	
0967	Strontian	0024 (OB)	

Codes beginning 00 were also used for premium rate numbers or as a short code for dialling calls to various places in the Republic of Ireland over the next few decades.

== All figure dialling ==
The use of names in allocating STD codes was intended to provide a mnemonic for the exchange in the same way as for the Director system, but the mnemonic link was often obscure. A single charge group code would usually cover multiple exchanges in various locations, which were identified either by a linked numbering scheme or extended codes. This meant that many exchanges were given alphanumeric STD codes that did not relate to their names: Swallow's code of 0GR 289 only made sense if you knew it was connected to Grimsby, for example. In addition, telephones connected to automatic exchanges in non-director areas had been issued with dials that had numbers but not letters printed on them, so would need to have new dials fitted to enable alphanumeric dialling.

At the same time, international direct dialling was being introduced and as other countries (such as the US) had different assignments of letters to digits the opportunity for confusion existed. An earlier modification to get round this problem for European dialling was the addition of the letter Q to the digit 0, which previously represented only the letter O. This was because some French exchanges had alphabetic codes including Q, but in the event France moved to all-digit codes before direct dialling from the UK was introduced.

The use of alphabetic exchange (area) codes was abandoned in the UK in 1966 in favour of all figure numbering. Nevertheless, about 60% of current area codes are still based on the original alphabetic STD codes.

== Special services ==
Until the mid-1980s freephone numbers could be accessed only by ringing the operator on 100 and asking to be connected, e.g. Freephone 8963 for BT customer service. From 1985, the 0800 code came into use for freephone services. These numbers usually had 10 digits, but a few exceptions had only 8 digits, e.g. 0800 1111 for ChildLine.

From around 1980, calls to Radiophones could also be direct dialled.

0034—Area 1 (Greater London)
0036—Area 2 (Severn and Midlands)
0037—Area 3 (Liverpool and the North-East)
0033—Area 4 (Southern and Eastern Scotland)
0039—Area 5 (Southern England)

These covered only a small part of the country. The 0035 and 0038 codes were added later.

In the 1980s, these other allocations were also in use:

0055—"Talkabout"
0066—"Super Call"
0072—Radio Paging
0073—Radio Paging
0077—"Super Call"

== Calls to the Republic of Ireland ==
Until the late 1980s, calls to major towns and cities in the Republic of Ireland could also be made using short codes starting with 000:

0001—Dublin 01 area
0002—Cork 021 area
0004—Dundalk 042 area
0005—Waterford 051 area
0006—Limerick 061 area
0007—Letterkenny 074 area
0009—Galway 091 area

and

0015—Sligo

This was discontinued in the late 1980s, so that all calls to the Republic of Ireland from the UK had to be dialled in the normal international format using the international access code (initially 010 until 1995, and then 00) and country code (353).

Calls could also be made using the full international dialling code since the introduction of International Direct Dialling.

While most of the Republic of Ireland could be direct dialled, a small number of rural areas did not have an automated telephone service until the 1980s. As a result, calls from the UK to these areas had to be made through the BT operator who connected the calls to their Irish counterpart for completion. Unlike other international calls, these were handled by the BT national operator, in the same way as UK operator calls. This service was withdrawn at noon on 28 May 1987 when the last manual exchange in Ireland, at Mountshannon, County Clare, was switched over to an Alcatel E10 digital exchange. This completed Telecom Éireann's (now called eircom) rural digitalisation project.

Although full international dialling is now used, calls from Northern Ireland landlines to landlines in the Republic are charged at UK national or local rates, and calls from Great Britain to the Republic are charged at a special "Republic of Ireland" rate, higher than inland rates, but lower than those for elsewhere in Western Europe. Additionally, calls to Northern Ireland from the Republic of Ireland can be made without an international access code, but instead replacing the British 028 prefix not with the conventional international prefix 00 44 28 but with a shorter Irish 048 area code which specifically covers Northern Ireland. For example, calling Belfast from London would be 028 9xxx xxxx while calling Belfast from Dublin would be 048 9xxx xxxx. However, it is also possible to make calls using the normal international 00 44 28 xxxx xxxx format. In both cases, calls are charged at a much lower rate than calls to Britain. In recent years, these arrangements are becoming less relevant as customers in both countries have access to a wide range of telephone service providers, cable telephony services, mobile operators and alternative services based on VoIP. Some providers include unlimited calls to the UK or Republic of Ireland (and many other countries) in various bundled packages.

== Mixed areas in Northern Ireland ==
In Northern Ireland, many of the area codes were created as "mixed" areas. There were a number of code changes within Northern Ireland over the years with some exchanges swapping to different area codes.

In 1993, further changes were made throughout Northern Ireland in preparation for PhONEday in 1995. Many of the changes were eliminating 3-digit and 4-digit subscriber numbers in rural exchanges by adding extra digits; the table below shows the end result. The system of "mixed" areas remained in place.

Mixed area code (1990s)	"Mixed" area code name (1990s)	Local number length	Local numbers begin (1990s)
0247	Bangor	6	2-6, 8, 9
024 77	Kircubbin	5	2-9
0265	Coleraine	5 or 6	2-5, 8, 9
026 56	Ballymoney	5	2-9
026 57	Ballycastle	5	2-9
0266	Ballymena	5 or 6	2-4, 6, 8, 9
026 65	Kilrea	5	2-9
026 67	Martinstown	5	2-9
0365	Enniskillen	6	2-4, 8, 9
036 55	Fivemiletown	5	2-9
036 56	Kesh	5	2-9
036 57	Lisnaskea	5	2-9
0396	Downpatrick	6	2-6, 8, 9
039 67	Newcastle	5	2-9
0504	Londonderry	6	2-6, 8, 9
050 47	Limavady	5	2-9
0648	Magherafelt	5 or 6	2-6, 8, 9
064 87	Cookstown	5	2-9
0662	Omagh	6	2-9
066 25	Ballygawley	5	2-9
066 26	Newtownstewart	5	2-9
066 27	Carrickmore	5	2-9
0693	Newry	5 or 6	2-6, 8, 9
069 37	Rostrevor	5	2-9
0820	Banbridge	5? or 6?	2-4, 6-9
082 06	Banbridge	5	2-9

== Additional codes for mobile, freephone, non-geographic, premium rate and pagers ==
0459, 0802, 0831, 0839, 0860, 0881, 0891, 0893, 0897, 0898, 0921, 0941, 0961, 0979, 0987, 0998 and 0999 had never been used for geographic area codes, so could be used for non-geographic and mobile services as soon as the need arose. The prefixes listed in the table below were introduced at various times from the early 1980s to the mid-1990s. The details and timeline of these allocations is complex, and most have since migrated to various 07, 08 and 09 ranges in the Big Number Change.

Other codes had multiple uses over the years. For example, 0500 was originally assigned to a 'ring' of exchanges around Edinburgh which were moved to the 031 linked numbering scheme (0131 after PhONEday); some years later, 0500 was used for Mercury Freephone services.

Canonbie was moved from 054 15 to the new Langholm 038 73 "mixed" area (0138 73 after PhONEday). 0541 5 was then re-allocated as the National Rate non-geographic code for C&WC AreaCall which then became 0870 15 in the Big Number Change.

Hornsea was moved from 0401 to join with the existing Patrington allocation at 0964 (01964 after PhONEday). This created the 0964 Hornsea and Patrington ELNS area. 0401 later went on to be used for Cellnet mobile until moving to 07701 in the Big Number Change.

Some prefixes had dual usage when no longer used for geographic area codes. Basildon originally had two charge group code ranges – 0268 for the town and 0374 for rural exchanges – which were merged to a linked number scheme on 0268. The 0374 5 number block was used for National Rate calls while the rest of the 0374 range was used for Vodafone mobile phones. Likewise, after subscribers on the Weardale 0956 charge group code were migrated to the Bishop Auckland STD code, the 0956 7 block was used for personal numbering and the rest of 0956 was used for One-to-One mobile telephones.

The area codes 0921, 0987, 0998 and 0999 were never used., the last of which due to possible confusion with the 999 emergency number.

Freephone		Local Rate		National Rate	
Code	Usage	Code	Usage	Code	Usage
0321 xxxxxx	Vodafone Freephone	0345 xxxxxx	BT Lo-Call	0374 5xxxxx	National rate
0500 xxxxxx	Mercury Freecall	0645 xxxxxx	Mercury LocalCall	0541 5xxxxx	Mercury AreaCall
0800 xxxxxx	BT Freefone			0990 xxxxxx	BT NationalCall
Premium Rate Services
Code	Usage	Code	Usage	Code	Usage
0331	VoData premium rate	0881 1xxxxx	Mercury premium rate	0898 xxxxxx	BT premium rate
0336 xxxxxx	VoData premium rate	0881 2xxxxx	Mercury premium rate	0930 0xxxxx	Premium rate
0338	Mercury premium rate	0881 3xxxxx	Mercury premium rate	0930 1xxxxx	Premium rate
0632 xxxxxx	Premium rate	0881 5xxxxx	Mercury premium rate	0930 2xxxxx	Premium rate
0640	Mercury premium rate	0881 6xxxxx	Mercury premium rate	0930 3xxxxx	Premium rate
0660 xxxxxx	Mercury premium rate	0881 7xxxxx	Mercury premium rate	0930 4xxxxx	Premium rate
0696 xxxxxx	Premium rate	0881 9xxxxx	Mercury premium rate	0930 5xxxxx	Premium rate
0696 6xxxxx	Jersey Telecoms premium rate	0890 xxxxxx	Premium rate	0930 6xxxxx	Premium rate
0696 8xxxxx	Manx Telecoms premium rate	0891 xxxxxx	BT ValueCall	0930 8xxxxx	Premium rate
0696 9xxxxx	Guernsey Telecoms premium rate	0894	BT premium rate	0930 9xxxxx	Premium rate
0836 4xxxxx	Vodafone premium rate	0895	premium rate?	0941 xxxxxx	Premium rate (Pagers?)
0839 xxxxxx	Mercury premium rate?	0896	Premium rate	0991	Mercury premium rate
0853	Premium rate	0897	BT premium rate		
Mobile Telephones				Pagers	
Code	Usage	Code	Usage	Code	Usage
0370 xxxxxx	Vodafone	0802 xxxxxx	BT Cellnet	0399 0xxxxx → 01399 0xxxxx	VodaPage
0374 0xxxxx	Vodafone	0831 xxxxxx	Vodafone	0399 xxxxxx → 01399 xxxxxx	VodaPage
0374 1xxxxx	Vodafone	0836 xxxxxx	Vodafone	0426 xxxxxx → 01426 xxxxxx	BT Paging
0374 2xxxxx	Vodafone	0839 xxxxxx	Vodafone	0459 2xxxxx → 01459 2xxxxx	Mercury/PageOne
0374 3xxxxx	Vodafone	0850 xxxxxx	BT Cellnet	0459 3xxxxx → 01459 3xxxxx	VodaPage
0374 4xxxxx	Vodafone	0860 xxxxxx	BT Cellnet	0459 4xxxxx → 01459 4xxxxx	VodaPage
0374 6xxxxx	Vodafone	0930 7xxxxx (0961 7xxxxx)	One-to-One	0459 5xxxxx → 01459 5xxxxx	VodaPage
0374 7xxxxx	Vodafone	0956 1xxxxx	One-to-One	0459 6xxxxx → 01459 6xxxxx	VodaPage
0374 8xxxxx	Vodafone	0956 2xxxxx	One-to-One	0459 8xxxxx → 01459 8xxxxx	VodaPage
0374 9xxxxx	Vodafone	0956 3xxxxx	One-to-One	0459 9xxxxx → 01459 9xxxxx	Mercury/PageOne
0378 xxxxxx	Vodafone	0956 4xxxxx	One-to-One	01523 xxxxxx	PageOne
0385 xxxxxx	Vodafone	0956 5xxxxx	One-to-One	01893 xxxxxx	BT Paging
0390 xxxxxx	Orange	0956 6xxxxx	One-to-One	0336 7xxxxx	Vodafone
0401 xxxxxx	BT Cellnet	0956 8xxxxx	One-to-One	0385 4xxxxx	Vodata?
0402 xxxxxx	BT Cellnet	0956 9xxxxx	One-to-One	0385 6xxxxx	Vodata
0403 xxxxxx	BT Cellnet	0958 xxxxxx	One-to-One	04325 xxxxxx	BT Paging
0408 xxxxxx	BT mobile Personal Assistant	0961 0xxxxx	One-to-One	04624 xxxxxx	Isle of Man?
0410 xxxxxx	BT Cellnet	0961 1xxxxx	One-to-One	0660 xxxxxx	PageOne
0411 xxxxxx	BT Cellnet	0961 2xxxxx	One-to-One	0839 xxxxxx	PageOne
0421 xxxxxx	Vodafone	0961 3xxxxx	One-to-One	0881 0xxxxx	PageOne
0441 xxxxxx	Vodafone	0961 4xxxxx	One-to-One	0881 4xxxxx	PageOne
04481 xxxxxx	Guernsey Telecom	0961 5xxxxx	One-to-One	0881 8xxxxx	PageOne
0456 0xxxxx	Orange	0961 6xxxxx	One-to-One	0941 xxxxxx	Orange (HPL)
0456 1xxxxx	Orange	0961 8xxxxx	One-to-One	0941 1xxxxx	Orange (HPL)
04624 xxxxxx	Isle of Man	0961 9xxxxx	One-to-One		
0467 xxxxxx	Vodafone	0966 xxxxxx	Orange		
0468 xxxxxx	Vodafone	0973 xxxxxx	Orange		
0498 xxxxxx	Vodafone	0976 xxxxxx	Orange		
0585 xxxxxx	BT Cellnet	0979 7xxxxx	Jersey Telecom	0941 6xxxxx	Orange
0589 xxxxxx	BT Cellnet? Vodafone?				
Personal numbering
Code	Usage				
0956 7xxxxx	FleXtel Personal Numbering				

By the early 1990s it was becoming more difficult to remember the various codes that might cost a lot more to call than a local or national call, and many consumers were caught out with larger than expected bills. A more long-term solution would need to be found as it was clear that mobile usage in particular was going to push demand for new codes even further in the coming years.

== Number shortage ==
Several factors caused a shortage of telephone numbers in the 1980s. Both subscriber numbers and dialling codes began to run out.

Within existing area codes, the growth in second phone lines, direct dial-in (DDI) lines, fax machines and a need to find number ranges for new telecoms operators caused the demand for telephone numbers to exceed the available number ranges. The removal of local dialling codes freed up some number ranges, and piecemeal addition of digits to the start of subscriber numbers allowed new number ranges to be opened on exchanges with short subscriber numbers, but towns which already used four digit codes and six figure numbers could not add extra digits, because the trunk network could not handle numbers of more than nine digits after the 0 trunk prefix.

Rapid expansion of mobile and premium rate services quickly filled up number ranges on dialling codes that had not been allocated as STD codes, and there was a need to expand the number of dialling codes available in the future. Combining exchanges into ELNS and 'mixed' areas freed up a limited number of codes.

=== Creation of ELNS areas to free up area codes ===
In order to free up space for mobile, non-geographic, premium rate and pager services, 16 of the original STD codes with low number use were merged into 14 existing ranges so that each area code would cover multiple charge groups (these migration figures do not include the similar 091 area code changes). Four further STD codes were replaced entirely by a new 'Tyneside' area code.

For example, numbers in Barrow-in-Furness already used the ranges starting (0229) 2 and (0229) 5. Millom used the separate 0657 area code, but was already controlled by the Barrow-in-Furness Group Switching Centre. Millom numbers were transferred to the 0229 area code using number ranges beginning (0229) 3 and (0229) 7.

Under the new "ELNS" (Extended Linked Numbering Scheme) arrangement, two or more charge groups now share the same area code and the leading digit of the local number indicates which charge group the number belongs to. The new area code retains both of the old area code names. A diagram showing the principle is shown on page 9 of Oftel's telephone numbering guide and these areas are shown in the table below. Calls within the area code do not require the area code to be dialled, this is true even for calls between the charge groups.

"ELNS" area code (1990s)	"ELNS" area code name (1990s)	Local number length	Local numbers begin (1990s)	Old area code (1980s)	Old code re-use in 1990s	Moved to new code in 2001
091	Tyneside	7	2, 4	0632 Newcastle upon Tyne (NE)	0632 Premium rate	09xx x
091	Durham	7	3	0385 Durham (DU)	0385 Vodafone mobile	07785
091	Tyneside	7	4	0894 Tyneside (TY)	0894 Premium rate	09xx x
091	Sunderland	7	5	0783 Sunderland (SU)	??	
0229	Barrow-in-Furness (BA)	6	4, 5, 6, 8	0229 Barrow-in-Furness (BA)	-	-
0229	Millom	6	7	0657 Millom (ML)	??	
0339	Aboyne	6	8	0339 Deeside (DE)	-	-
0339	Ballater	6	7	0338 Deeside (DE)	0338 Premium rate	09xx x
0388	Bishop Auckland	6	3, 4, 6, 7, 8, 9	0388 Durham (DU)	-	-
0388	Stanhope	6	5	0956 Weardale (WL)	0956 1-6,8-9 One2One mobile	07956 x
0388	Stanhope	6	5	0956 Weardale (WL)	0956 7 FleXtel	070 107
0423	Boroughbridge	6	3, 9	0901 Boroughbridge, Yorkshire (YO)	??	
0423	Harrogate (HA)	6	2, 5, 7, 8	0423 Harrogate (HA)	-	-
0430	Market Weighton	6	8	0696 Market Weighton (MW)	0696 Premium rate	09xx x
0430	North Cave	6	4	0430 Howden (HD)	-	-
0434	Bellingham	6	2	0660 Bellingham, Northumberland (NM)	0660 Premium rate	09xx x
0434	Bellingham	6	2	0660 Bellingham, Northumberland (NM)	0660 Premium rate	076 61
0434	Haltwhistle	6	3	0498 Haltwhistle (HW)	0498 Vodafone mobile	07798
0434	Hexham (HE)	6	6, 7, 8	0434 Hexham (HE)	-	-
0437	Clynderwen [Clunderwen]	6	5	0991 Clynderwen, West Wales (WW)	0991 Premium rate	09xx x
0437	Haverfordwest (HF)	6	7, 8, 9	0437 Haverfordwest (HF)	-	-
0507	Alford (Lincs)	6	4, 8	0521 Alford, Lincolnshire (LC)	??	
0507	Louth (LO)	6	3, 6	0507 Louth (LO)	-	-
0507	Spilsby (Horncastle)	6	5	0658 Mareham le Fen (ML)	??	
0686	Llanidloes	6	4	0551 Llanidloes (LL)	??	
0686	Newtown (NT)	6	6, 8	0686 Newtown (NT)	-	-
0847	Thurso (TH)	6	5, 8	0847 Thurso (TH)	-	-
0847	Tongue	6	6	0800 Tongue (TO)	0800 Freephone	0800
0851	Great Bernera	6	6	0850 Callanish, Lewis, Outer Hebrides	0850 Cellnet mobile	07850
0851	Stornoway	6	7, 8	0851 Stornoway, Outer Hebrides	-	-
0890	Ayton [Eyemouth]	6	7	0390 Eyemouth (EY)	0390 Orange mobile	07790
0890	Coldstream	6	2, 3, 8	0890 Coldstream, Tweed (TW)	-	-
0964	Hornsea	6	5	0401 Hornsea (HO)	0401 Cellnet mobile	07701
0964	Patrington	6	6	0964 Patrington, Withernsea (WN)	-	-
0975	Alford (Aberdeen) [Deeside]	6	5	0336 Deeside (DE)	0336 Premium rate	09xx x?
0975	Strathdon	6	6	0975 Strathdon, Water (WR)	-	-

Of the 16 area codes freed up for alternative use in the 1980s, at least 11 were re-used for other services. For example, the 0401 area code was re-allocated to Cellnet mobile services. Five of the area codes remained unused, including 01632, which is now partially reserved for fictitious telephone numbers. In 1995, the PhONEday changes for geographic numbers solved the number shortage problem for mobile and non-geographic services by freeing up the whole 07, 08 and 09 range for their use from 2000 onwards.

On PhONEday in 1995, 0229 became 01229 and 0964 became 01964 and these codes are still in use today. The remainder of the "ELNS" area code allocations and their history are detailed in the table below.

The Cellnet mobile 0401 allocation stayed in use for about a decade before these numbers were transferred to the 07701 range in the Big Number Change in 2000. Nowadays all 16 of the area codes freed up in the 1980s (albeit now with a 1 prefix, e.g. 0401 is now 01401) remain unused and are available for future geographic expansion.

=== Creation of mixed areas ===
In order to free up further space for mobile, non-geographic, premium rate and pager services, 17 original geographic STD codes with low number use were condensed into 6 ranges under a "mixed" scheme. This involved creating new dialling codes that were extensions of existing area codes, mimicking the 'Core' and 'Ring' pattern of early STD codes.

For example, numbers in Dumfries already used (0387) 2 and (0387) 5, while numbers in Langholm were 4 or 5 digits long and used the 0541 area code. Langholm numbers were changed to 5 digits and transferred to the newly created 03873 area code.

Under the new "mixed" arrangement, although 0387 and 03873 have the same first four digits, they are treated as completely separate area codes. All calls from one area to the other require the area code to be dialled. Local numbers in Dumfries cannot begin with a "3".

On PhONEday in 1995, 0387 became 01387 and 03873 became 013873 and these codes are still in use today. The remainder of the "mixed" area code allocations and their history are detailed in the table below.

Of the 11 area codes freed up for alternative use in the 1980s, only 5 were actually re-used for other services. For example, the 0541 area code was re-allocated to C&WC Area Call services. Six of the area codes remained unused.

The C&WC 0541 allocation stayed in use for more than a decade before these numbers were transferred to the 0870 1 range in the Big Number Change in 2000. Nowadays all 11 of the area codes freed up in the 1980s (albeit now with a 1 prefix, e.g. 0541 is now 01541) remain unused and are available for future geographic expansion.

"Mixed" area code (1990s)	"Mixed" area code name (1990s)	Local number length	Local numbers begin (1990s)	Short local numbers begin	Old area code (1980s)	Old code re-use in 1990s	Moved to new code in 2001
0387	Dumfries (DU)	6	2, 4-9	-	0387 Dumfries (DU)	-	-
038 73	Langholm	5	2-9	-	0541 Langholm (LH)	0541 5 C&WC AreaCall	0870 15
0524	Lancaster (LA)	5 or 6	3-9	32-37, 39, 60-69	0524 Lancaster (LA)	-	-
052 42	Hornby-with-Farleton	5	2-9	-	0468 Ingleborough (IN)	0468 Vodafone mobile	07768
0539	Kendal (KE)	6	2-3, 7-9	-	0539 Kendal (KE)	-	-
053 94	Hawkshead	5	2-9	-	0966 Windermere (WM)	0966 Orange mobile	07966
053 95	Grange-over-Sands	5	2-9	-	0448 Grange-over-Sands (GG)	04481 Guernsey Telecom mobile	07781
053 96	Sedbergh	5	2-9	-	0587 Sedbergh, Lune (LU)	??	
0697	n/a	n/a	n/a	n/a	n/a	n/a	n/a
069 73	Wigton	5	2-9	-	0965 Wigton (WN)	??	
069 74	Raughton Head	5	2-9	-	0699 North West (NW)	??	
069 77	Brampton - North West (NW)	4 or 5	2-5	2-3	0697 North West (NW)	-	-
0768	Penrith (PN)	5 or 6	2, 5-6, 8-9	882-884, 886-888	0768 Penrith (PN)	-	-
076 83	Appleby-in-Westmorland	5	2-9	-	0930 Brough, Westmorland (WE)	0930 7 One2One mobile	07930 7
076 83	Appleby-in-Westmorland	5	2-9	-	0930 Brough, Westmorland (WE)	0930 0-6,8-9 Premium rate	09xx xx
076 84	Pooley Bridge	5	2-9	-	0853 Ullswater (UL)	0853 Premium rate	09xx x
076 87	Keswick	5	2-9	-	0596 Keswick (KW)	??	
0946	Whitehaven (WH)	5 or 6	2-6, 8-9	61-68	0946 Whitehaven (WH)	-	-
094 67	Gosforth	5	2-9	-	0940 Gosforth, Whitehaven (WH)	??	

== Widespread renumbering of dialling codes and number ranges ==
In order to allow for future growth, and to separate geographic and non-geographic number ranges, a number of significant changes were to be made to the UK numbering plan. All these stages were planned out in one exercise in the early 1980s, though the exact dates for each stage was decided later.

Even without the need for expansion, consumers were already becoming confused as to what they would be charged for any particular call, with for example (0404) xxxxx being a call to Honiton in Devon and (0403) xxxxxx being a much more expensive call to a mobile phone. The situation in the early 1990s was as follows:

Number prefix	Example of geographic use	Non-geographic services using other prefixes in same 0x range
01	Not used; was formerly the area code for London prior to 1990	Freephone, local and premium rate services (Note: Includes codes such as 01399, 01426, 01459, 01523, 01893, both before and after PhONEday.)
02	Aberdeen (0224)	Not used
03	Dover (0304)	Freephone; mobile; local, national and premium rate services
04	Gloucester (0452)	Mobile; national rate
05	Kinross (0577)	Freephone; mobile; national rate
06	Newbury (0635)	Local and premium rate services
07	Romford (0708)	Personal numbers
08	Tamworth (0827)	Freephone; mobile; local, national and premium rate services
09	York (0904)	Freephone; mobile; local, national and premium rate services

The next few changes would fix these problems.

=== Splitting 01 for London into 071 and 081 ===
The first major change was in May 1990, when the London 01 area code was replaced with 071 and 081. Local numbers remained seven digits long. Exchanges in central London used the 071 code. The remaining exchanges now used the 081 code and formed a ring around the 071 area. Although this effectively doubled the available numbers from eight to sixteen million, it was not to be the last change for the capital.

Area	New numbering	Old numbering
Inner London	071-xxx xxxx	01-xxx xxxx
Outer London	081-xxx xxxx	01-xxx xxxx

This change freed up the entire 01 code range for the next step of the plan: converting all geographic area codes to begin 01. That operation would then free up the whole of the 02 to 09 range for a future re-organisation of some geographic and all mobile and non-geographic numbers. Most areas would see two code changes over the next decade, whilst London would have a total of three. It would be a decade before this inner/outer London split was eventually nullified.

=== Initial allocations with 10 digits: freephone 0800 numbers ===
The longest telephone numbers in use until now had been 9 digits long (not including the 0 trunk code), e.g. 051 234 5678, 0303 456789, 03873 56789, 0800 445566. The long term plan is for migration to 10 digit numbering in the UK and in 1991 this started with new 0800 numbers being allocated with 10 digits.

Number range	Usage
0500 xxxxxx	Original 9-digit Mercury (now C&WC) freephone allocations since 1992
0800 xxxxxx	Original 9-digit BT freephone allocations since 1980s
0800 xxx xxxx	Additional 10-digit freephone numbers

=== Oftel administers number allocation from 1994 ===
With multiple operators joining the market, administration was passed to an independent regulator. Oftel took over administration of the UK’s telephone numbers from BT in 1994.

=== Changes to geographic numbers in 1995 (PhONEday) ===
==== Addition of '1' to geographic area codes ====
On "PhONEday", 16 April 1995, the digit "1" was inserted into all UK geographic area codes, including those in the director, all-figure dialling, ELNS and mixed areas. Under the new changes, for example, Inner London's 071 became 0171; Outer London's 081 became 0181. A small selection of the codes that changed are shown in the table below:

Area	New numbering	Old numbering
Ashford	(01233) xxxxxx	(0233) xxxxxx
Coventry	(01203) xxxxxx	(0203) xxxxxx
Consett/Stanley	(01207) xxxxxx	(0207) xxxxxx
Birmingham	(0121) xxx xxxx	021-xxx xxxx
Cardiff	(01222) xxxxxx	(0222) xxxxxx
Buxton	(01298) xxxxx	(0298) xxxxx
Edinburgh	(0131) xxx xxxx	031-xxx xxxx
Derby	(01332) xxxxxx	(0332) xxxxxx
Dundee	(01382) xxxxxx	(0382) xxxxxx
Evesham	(01386) xxxxxx	(0386) xxxxxx
Glasgow	(0141) xxx xxxx	041-xxx xxxx
Hull	(01482) xxxxxx	(0482) xxxxxx
Liverpool	(0151) xxx xxxx	051-xxx xxxx
Jersey	(01534) xxxxxx	(0534) xxxxxx
Hawkshead	(0153 94) xxxxx	(053 94) xxxxx
Luton	(01582) xxxxxx	(0582) xxxxxx
Manchester	(0161) xxx xxxx	061-xxx xxxx
Brampton	(0169 77) xxxx	(069 77) xxxx
Portsmouth	(01705) xxxxxx	(0705) xxxxxx
Southampton	(01703) xxxxxx	(0703) xxxxxx
Inner London	(0171) xxx xxxx	071-xxx xxxx
Reading	(01734) xxxxxx	(0734) xxxxxx
Outer London	(0181) xxx xxxx	081-xxx xxxx
Tyne and Wear/County Durham	(0191) xxx xxxx	091-xxx xxxx

This was done with a view to reorganising the numbering plan at a later date, so that the first and second digits would indicate the type of service called:

Area code prefix	Service type
00	International call prefix
0	Trunk prefix
01	Geographic area codes
02	New geographic area codes
03	Originally reserved for new geographic area codes, but later used for non-geographic number ranges, charged at geographic rates.
04	Reserved
05	Corporate numbering
06	Formerly reserved for future personal numbering
07	Mobile phones, pagers and personal numbering
08	Freephone and shared cost / special rates
09	Premium rate

==== Introduction of replacement area codes ====
Five new area codes were introduced for cities that were running low on phone numbers—and a digit was prefixed to each existing local number to allow for future expansion.

City	New numbering	Old numbering	Notes
Leeds	(0113) 2xx xxxx	(0532) xxxxxx	53 = LE
Leeds	(0113) 3xx xxxx		New phase of numbers, issued from 1997.
Leeds	(0113) 8xx xxxx		New phase of numbers, issued from 2006.
Leeds	(0113) 4xx xxxx		New phase of numbers, issued from 2010.
Sheffield	(0114) 2xx xxxx	(0742) xxxxxx	74 = SH
Sheffield	(0114) 3xx xxxx		New phase of numbers, issued from 2004.
Sheffield	(0114) 4xx xxxx		New phase of numbers, issued from 2009.
Nottingham	(0115) 9xx xxxx	(0602) xxxxxx	60 = NO
Nottingham	(0115) 8xx xxxx		New phase of numbers, issued from 1997.
Nottingham	(0115) 7xx xxxx		New phase of numbers, issued from 2006.
Nottingham	(0115) 2xx xxxx		Small quantity issued late 2009 and early 2010.
Leicester	(0116) 2xx xxxx	(0533) xxxxxx	53 = LE
Leicester	(0116) 3xx xxxx		New phase of numbers, issued from 2004.
Leicester	(0116) 4xx xxxx		New phase of numbers, issued from 2009.
Bristol	(0117) 9xx xxxx	(0272) xxxxxx	27 = BR
Bristol	(0117) 2xx xxxx		New phase of numbers, issued from 2007.
Bristol	(0117) 3xx xxxx		New phase of numbers, issued from 1997.
Bristol	(0117) 4xx xxxx		New phase of numbers, issued from 2012.

Most of the initial local number ranges created by PhONEday were exhausted within just a few years. New local numbers then began to be allocated with a different initial digit. For example, in Sheffield (0114) when the 2xx xxxx numbers were exhausted, new numbers (other than old recycled ones) then began to be issued from the 3xx xxxx range. Similarly, newly allocated numbers in Leeds (0113), Leicester (0116) and Bristol (0117) also came from the 3xx xxxx range, but in Nottingham (0115), the new numbers instead came from the 8xx xxxx range.

Less than a decade later, further new ranges were opened in most of these areas. See table above for further details.

==== PhONEday changes to National Dialling Only numbers ====
One early solution to a shortage of numbers had been to allocate number ranges that could only be dialled with the full area code, including numbers beginning 0 and 1. These ranges were not normally used for subscriber numbers, because dialling them without using the area code might result in the call being connected to another number altogether. For example, if Leeds (0532) 100xxx were dialled from within Leeds without the area code, the caller would be connected to the Operator on 100 before the remaining digits would be accepted. These numbers were designated 'National Dialling Only' numbers and usually assigned to automatic equipment, such as burglar alarms or dedicated lines for computer modems, or as the destinations for non-geographic numbers.

City	New numbering	Old numbering	Notes
Leeds	0113 0ax xxxx	0532 0xxxxx	53 = LE
Leeds	0113 1ax xxxx	0532 1xxxxx	
Sheffield	0114 0ax xxxx	0742 0xxxxx	74 = SH
Sheffield	0114 1ax xxxx	0742 1xxxxx	
Nottingham	0115 0ax xxxx	0602 0xxxxx	60 = NO
Nottingham	0115 1ax xxxx	0602 1xxxxx	
Leicester	0116 0ax xxxx	0533 0xxxxx	53 = LE
Leicester	0116 1ax xxxx	0533 1xxxxx	
Bristol	0117 0ax xxxx	0272 0xxxxx	27 = BR
Bristol	0117 1ax xxxx	0272 1xxxxx	

==== International calls from the UK ====
The international access code also changed on "PhONEday", from 010 to 00 thus meeting the international call prefix standard set by the International Telecommunication Union (ITU).

=== 112 emergency number in addition to 999 ===
In 1995, the United Kingdom adopted the pan-European 112 emergency services number. This new number runs alongside the existing 999 number, first introduced in 1937.

112 or 999	Emergency services (police, fire, ambulance, coastguard, mountain rescue, cave rescue)

=== Changes between PhONEday and the Big Number Change ===
==== New dialling code for Reading ====
Area	New numbering	Old numbering (Note: These areas had added a "1" to the area code at PhONEday. Previous to that, these codes were 0xxx with six-figure local numbers, except London and parts of NI. London codes were previously 0x1 with seven-figure local numbers. NI codes added a "1" at PhONEday but some areas previously had longer codes than shown, paired with shorter numbers that were often only four or five digits long.)	Notes
Reading	(0118) 9xx xxxx	(0734) xxxxxx → (01734) xxxxxx	73 = RE; changed between 1996 and 1998, not on PhONEday
Reading	(0118) 3xx xxxx		New phase of numbers, issued from 1998.
Reading	(0118) 4xx xxxx		New phase of numbers, issued from 2009.

Reading numbers endured two changes in a very short time. PhONEday, on 16 April 1995, changed the area code from 0734 to 01734, and then almost a year later, on 8 April 1996, it changed again to (0118). At that time, local numbers were changed from six to seven digits by inserting a 9 in front of the old local number. Parallel running of the old numbering was withdrawn on 9 January 1998.

National Dialling Only numbers in Reading were changed as follows:

Area	New numbering	Old numbering	Notes
Reading	0118 0ax xxxx	01734 0xxxxx	73 = RE; changed between 1996 and 1998, not on PhONEday
Reading	0118 1ax xxxx	01734 1xxxxx	

==== New personal numbers with revenue-share start using 070 ====
In 1995, the 070 prefix began to be allocated for personal numbers (PNS). These new numbers had 10 digits.

Number range	Usage
070 xxxx xxxx	New 10-digit personal numbers

New numbers at 070 107x xxxx were held aside in order for FleXtel personal numbers at 0956 7xxxxx to migrate in the forthcoming Big Number Change in 2000.

The geographic area codes 0700 to 0709 had only recently been moved to 01700 to 01709 on PhONEday. New 070 personal number allocations had to be chosen carefully such that mis-dialled calls for old pre-PhONEday geographic numbers would fail to connect rather than connect the caller to a user of a new personal number. Oftel identified old (070x) xx geographic number ranges that had not been used before and re-allocated those first.

For example, The Welwyn Garden City (0707) 4x range (now 01707 4x) had never been used, so 070 74xx quickly came into use for personal numbering in 1996. However, the (0707) 3x range (now 01707 3x) had been in use within Welwyn Garden City, and these numbers remained protected by Oftel for a number of years. The 070 73xx range of numbers finally came into use for personal numbering in 2007.

070 numbers initially allowed revenue share. These numbers are easy to mistake for mobile phone numbers and many scams developed. Oftel consulted on various proposals. Eventually revenue share was banned on these lines and they also fell under the jurisdiction of ICSTIS (later PhonepayPlus, more recently the Phone-paid Services Authority), the premium rate services regulator.

==== New mobile numbers start using 077xx, 078xx, 079xx ====
Geographic numbers had been moved to begin 01 in the PhONEday changes in 1995. Pre-existing mobile phone, non-geographic, premium rate and pager services continued to use the same 9-digit 02xx xxxxxx to 09xx xxxxxx numbers as before. It would be several more years before these would add a digit to become 10-digit numbers and move to the 07, 08 and 09 ranges in the Big Number Change in 2000-2001.

From May 1997, new mobile phone services started using numbers beginning 077, 078 or 079 re-using area codes recently vacated by 9-digit geographic numbers. These new mobile numbers have 10 digits.

Number range	Usage
077xx xxxxxx	New 10-digit mobile telephone allocations
078xx xxxxxx	New 10-digit mobile telephone allocations
079xx xxxxxx	New 10-digit mobile telephone allocations

BT Cellnet started with 07801 xxxxxx, 07803 xxxxxx, 07808 xxxxxx and 07809 xxxxxx. Vodafone started with 07771 xxxxxx and 07775 xxxxxx in May 1997. One2One started using 07804 xxxxxx and 07806 xxxxxx numbers in May 1995. 07xxx codes for new allocations by operators have been issued by Oftel since May 1997. It would be another few years before older BT Cellnet 0802 xxxxxx numbers were converted to 07802 xxxxxx, Vodafone 0370 xxxxxx numbers were converted to 07770 xxxxxx and One2One 0961 xxxxxx numbers were converted to 07961 xxxxxx in the Big Number Change.

==== New pager numbers start using 076 ====
Pre-existing pager numbers were already scattered under various codes in the 02xx to 09xx range and had 9 digits. Several services used non-standard 01 numbers. These would all eventually be moved to 076 codes and to 10 digits in the Big Number Change in 2000.

From 1998 onwards, new pager numbers began to be issued in parts of the 076 range. These new numbers had 10 digits.

Number range	Usage
076 xxxx xxxx	New 10-digit pager allocations

Various parts of the 076 range were set aside for pager number migration in the forthcoming Big Number Change in 2000.

The number range 07624 xxxxxx was set aside for mobile telephones in the Isle of Man (for migration from 04624). This would also come into use as a part of the Big Number Change.

==== "08" consumer protection ====
The initial plan for the new "08" number range was such that rates charged to people calling an 08 telephone number would be made more clear by linking the cost of the call to the second digit of the National Significant Number. Numbers starting 080 would be free (except from mobile phones), while 082 would be cheaper than 089.

==== New freephone numbers start using 0808 ====
In 1997, Oftel released 10-digit numbers beginning 0808 designated as freephone services. These calls are free only from a landline or public payphone.

Number range	Usage
0808 0xx xxxx	10-digit freephone numbers (held in reserve for forthcoming 0321 Big Number Change migration)
0808 1xx xxxx to 0808 8xx xxxx	New 10-digit freephone allocations
0808 9xx xxxx	New 10-digit freephone allocations for internet services

Both BT and Mercury issued only 10-digit freephone numbers to users after 1997. With the market opened up to competition, many other companies also allocated these numbers to users.

Usage of pre-existing 10- and 9-digit 0800 numbers and pre-existing 9-digit 0500 numbers continued as before.

Additionally, numbers in the range 0808 80x xxxx are reserved for not-for-profit helplines and as such are usually free to call from most mobile telephones. A number of other numbers can also be called for free from mobiles, but this varies by network.

==== New non-geographic revenue-share numbers start using 0845 and 0870 ====
From 1996 onwards, Oftel brought various new 10-digit non-geographic 0845 and 0870 numbers into use.

Number range	Usage
0845 xxx xxxx	New 10-digit non-geographic numbers
0870 xxx xxxx	New 10-digit non-geographic numbers

Only certain sub-parts of each code were made available for immediate use. Numbers at 0845 7, 0845 9, 0870 1, 0870 4, 0870 5 and other ranges were set aside for numbers such as 0345, 0374, 0541, 0645 and 0990 that would be migrating from 9-digits to 10-digits and to these two 08xx codes in the forthcoming Big Number Change in 2000.

In these early days, the price for calling 0845 numbers from landlines was tied to BT's price for calls to local geographic numbers. Similarly, the price for calling 0870 numbers from landlines was tied to BT's price for national calls to geographic numbers.

==== NHS direct ====
The short number 0845 1888 was set aside in March 1998 for trials of the new NHS direct service with calls charged at the "local rate". At a later date, the number was changed to 0845 46 47.

==== Warnings from Oftel ====
After the migration of geographic 0xxx area codes to new 01xxx codes on PhONEday (also 0xx → 01xx and 0xxxx → 01xxxx of course), some of the old area codes had started to be re-used for other purposes. For example, 0870 (Isle of Benbecula, Outer Hebrides) had been moved to 01870 and now 0870 started to be re-used for non-geographic services. Oftel had to issue a warning to operators to remove their "this number has changed, please redial inserting a one after the initial zero" messages that had been applied on PhONEday so that callers could get through to the new non-geographic numbers.

==== Premium rate and mobile problems ====
With the diverse usage and pricing of similar looking codes there could easily be a nasty shock when the bill arrived. Office phone systems could be set to block various premium rate prefixes, but it was important to regularly review and update the list. For those that did not, problems accessing some numbers were beginning to develop. The 0930 code was mainly used for premium rate services, but 0930 7xxxxx was used by One2One for mobile telephone services. Some people found that calls to all 0930 numbers were barred and hence also those mobile phones. To overcome this, the 0961 7xxxxx range was mirrored on to 0930 7xxxxx. These were all 9-digit numbers.

==== New premium rate services start using 090x ====
From 1998 onwards, 090x numbers with 10 digits started coming into use for premium rate services. As with 084 and 087 numbers, certain small number blocks within the 090x range were set aside for migration of old premium rate codes in the forthcoming Big Number Change.

090x xxx xxxx	New 10-digit premium rate content services ("PRS")

The 09 number range was originally subdivided as follows:

0900 xxx xxxx 0901 xxx xxxx	Time charged calls up to and including 60ppm and total call cost not greater than £5 or fixed fee up to £1 per call.
0902 xxx xxxx 0903 xxx xxxx 0904 xxx xxxx 0905 xxx xxxx	Protected for PRS expansion.
0906 xxx xxxx	Open ended time dependent charge or fixed fee.
0907 xxx xxxx	Pay for product that costs more than £1 in total.
0908 xxx xxxx	Protected for PRS expansion.
0909 xxx xxxx	Sexual entertainment services

From 23 August 1999, Oftel added the 0905 range as by then 0906 was almost fully allocated.

0905 xxx xxxx	Open ended time dependent charge or fixed fee.

==== Internet for schools ====
Announced in November 1997 and issued from February 1998 onwards the 0820 range was designated "internet for schools".

0820 xxx xxxx	Internet for schools (10-digit numbers)

==== Number conservation ====
As the number of lines in use continued to grow, some areas became close to full capacity. In the late-1990s, Oftel signalled a number of areas of concern.

By 2005		By 2005		By 2012	
01202	Bournemouth	01483	Guildford	01204	Bolton
01203	Coventry	01642	Middlesbrough	01344	Ascot (Bracknell/Easthampstead)
01223	Cambridge	01772	Preston	01582	Markyate (Luton)
01224	Aberdeen	01782	Stoke-on-Trent	01604	Northampton
01273	Brighton	01865	Oxford	01706	Rochdale
01274	Bradford	01902	Wolverhampton	01733	Peterborough
01332	Derby	01942	Wigan	01753	Iver (Slough)

Of these, only Coventry was immediately addressed - by migration to the 024 code and eight digit subscriber numbers in the Big Number Change in 2000. The Bournemouth, Aberdeen, Brighton, Bradford and Middlesbrough (as well as Milton Keynes, despite not being initially highlighted in the report) areas were later addressed in 2012 and 2014 by requiring 11-digit dialling for local calls (see the 2012 and 2014 local number dialling sections below), as an interim measure until shorter area codes and 8 digit local numbers are introduced.

==== Broadband services ====
The 092x to 099x range was designated "broadband services".

092x xxx xxxx to 099x xxx xxxx	Broadband services (10-digit numbers)

The allocation was never used and eventually removed from the plan in 2005.

==== Number ranges formerly used by local dialling codes ====
Between the 1930s and 1990s, calls between nearby exchanges could often be dialled using a "short code", often beginning 7, 8 or 9. As exchanges were combined into linked numbering schemes, these local codes were either absorbed into longer subscriber numbers or withdrawn in favour of full STD codes by the late 1990s. After a short delay, 6-digit subscriber numbers beginning 7 or 8 began to be issued in these 01xxx areas, and with 5-digits in 01xxxx areas. In the mid- and late -2000s, some of these areas also started issuing subscriber numbers beginning 9.

=== "Big Number Change" in 2000 ===
With 02x area codes freed up by the previous reorganisation, they could be re-used. On 22 April 2000 the second phase of the plan came into operation, dubbed the "Big Number Change". This changed the area codes of seven areas, including both inner and outer London and the whole of Northern Ireland. These areas had already had a code change (to insert a "1") five years earlier as a part of PhONEday. The Big Number Change altered the area codes again, and increased the length of subscriber numbers to 8 digits.

==== 020 for London ====
The Big Number change meant that London returned to a single area code again (as in the old 01 days), with no "inner/outer" split. Existing London numbers acquired the prefixes 7 or 8, but from that point on (020) 7xxx xxxx and (020) 8xxx xxxx numbers were assigned or reused anywhere in the London area covered by the single (city-wide) 020 code.

From June 2005 the regulator, Ofcom, ceased to allocate new number blocks to suppliers in the 7xxx xxxx and 8xxx xxxx ranges. From this date onwards all number allocations were in the 3xxx xxxx range and can be used anywhere in the London 020 area. Although new blocks of 7xxx xxxx and 8xxx xxxx range numbers are no longer being allocated to suppliers, those that have not yet exhausted their existing blocks are able to continue to issue and re-issue them to their customers.

Area	New numbering	Old numbering	Notes
London	(020) 7xxx xxxx	0171-xxx xxxx	Used for existing inner London numbers and new numbers London-wide.
London	(020) 8xxx xxxx	0181-xxx xxxx	Used for existing outer London numbers and new numbers London-wide.
London	(020) 3xxx xxxx		New phase of numbers, released London-wide from June 2005.
London	(020) 4xxx xxxx		New phase of numbers, released London-wide from October 2019.

Numbers in the 020 0xxx xxxx and 020 1xxx xxxx number ranges have also been made available. However, these numbers cannot be dialled without the 020 code and are called "National Dialling Only" numbers. They are mainly used as termination points for non-geographic numbers, and for various alarm and other automated systems where the actual telephone number itself is never called

==== Geographic numbers in England and Wales outside London ====
Area	New numbering	Old numbering	Notes
Southampton	(023) 80xx xxxx	(01703) xxxxxx	70 = SO
Southampton	(023) 81xx xxxx		New phase of numbers, released from 2005.
Southampton	(023) 82xx xxxx		New phase of numbers, released from 2012.
Portsmouth	(023) 92xx xxxx	(01705) xxxxxx	70 = PO
Portsmouth	(023) 93xx xxxx		New phase of numbers, released from 2005.
Coventry	(024) 76xx xxxx	(01203) xxxxxx	20 = CO
Coventry	(024) 77xx xxxx		New phase of numbers, released from 2005.
Coventry	(024) 75xx xxxx		New phase of numbers, released from 2012.
Cardiff	(029) 20xx xxxx	(01222) xxxxxx	22 = CA
Cardiff	(029) 21xx xxxx		New phase of numbers released from June 2005.
Cardiff	(029) 22xx xxxx		New phase of numbers released from August 2010.

Although Southampton and Portsmouth are one code from a code structure and local dialling point of view, calls between them are not treated as local calls for pricing purposes.

It is planned that the new codes will eventually cover a larger area than at present. For example, although (029) currently covers just the Cardiff area, it may in the future cover all of Wales. Conveniently, this could be 0AW (All Wales) if area codes ever become partially alphabetic again.

==== Geographic numbers in Northern Ireland ====
A unified code for Northern Ireland of (028) was introduced to replace eight area codes. The transition codes for Northern Ireland are shown below.

The prefixes for existing numbers in Northern Ireland are split up into seven groups, roughly based upon the county in which the main exchange is based. The initial digit of each phone number is based on the designated county—for example, the first county alphabetically is County Antrim so numbers in this county start with 2. The next county is County Armagh so numbers here start with 3. One exception to this is the Greater Belfast area, initial digit 9, which is extended to include each adjacent former STD code area, including the towns of Bangor, (County Down) (91), Lisburn (92), Carrickfergus (93), Antrim (94) and Saintfield (97). The encompassed former STD codes at some points extend to over 20 miles from Belfast itself. There is a much more complete list in the Big Number Change article.

Town/city	Region	New numbering	Old numbering
Larne	County Antrim	(028) 28xx xxxx	(01574) xxxxxx
Armagh	County Armagh	(028) 37xx xxxx	(01861) xxxxxx
Newcastle	County Down	(028) 437x xxxx	(013967) xxxxx
Enniskillen	County Fermanagh	(028) 66xx xxxx	(01365) xxxxxx
Limavady	County Londonderry	(028) 777x xxxx	(015047) xxxxx
Omagh	County Tyrone	(028) 82xx xxxx	(01662) xxxxxx
Belfast	Greater Belfast	(028) 90xx xxxx	(01232) xxxxxx
Lisburn	Greater Belfast	(028) 92xx xxxx	(01846) xxxxxx

The 028 area can be accessed from the Republic of Ireland using either the domestic code 048, or the international prefix 00 44 28.

==== National Dialling Only numbers ====
Existing National Dialling Only numbers were remapped in each area code.

Area	New numbering	Old numbering	Notes
London	020 01xx xxxx	0171-0xx xxxx	A non-trivial relationship maps the old blocks of numbers to the new number blocks.
London	020 11xx xxxx	0171-1xx xxxx	A non-trivial relationship maps the old blocks of numbers to the new number blocks.
London	020 00xx xxxx	0181-0xx xxxx	A non-trivial relationship maps the old blocks of numbers to the new number blocks.
London	020 10xx xxxx	0181-1xx xxxx	A non-trivial relationship maps the old blocks of numbers to the new number blocks.
Southampton	023 110x xxxx	01703 0xxxxx	70 = SO
Southampton	023 111x xxxx	01703 1xxxxx	70 = SO
Portsmouth	023 100x xxxx	01705 0xxxxx	70 = PO
Portsmouth	023 101x xxxx	01705 1xxxxx	70 = PO
Coventry	024 100x xxxx	01203 0xxxxx	20 = CO
Coventry	024 101x xxxx	01203 1xxxxx	20 = CO
Cardiff	029 100x xxxx	01222 0xxxxx	22 = CA
Cardiff	029 101x xxxx	01222 1xxxxx	22 = CA

==== Non-geographic, and mobile and pager numbers ====
In addition, mobile and pager numbers were all moved into the 07xxx range. Pagers moved into 076xx, while personal numbers moved to 070. Mobile phone numbers moved into the 077xx, 078xx and 079xx ranges (and more recently, 075xx, 074xx, 073xx and 071xx have also been brought into use).

The exception to this was Manx Telecom mobile phone numbers, where the old 04624 mobile code became 07624 in order to match the 01624 used for landlines.

In addition, lower and higher rate non-geographic numbers (previously called lo-call or local-rate and national-rate numbers, though these terms are no longer recommended to be used as they can be misleading) migrated to 08xx and premium rate numbers migrated to 09xx.

A summary of the migration path for the existing mobile and pager codes, as they were at the time, is shown below:

Mobile phone numbers		Pager numbers	
Code before migration	Code after migration	Code before migration	Code after migration
03AB	077AB	01ABC	076BC
04AB	077AB	04ABC	076BC
05AB	078AB	09AB	076AB
08AB	078AB		
09AB	079AB		

=== Changes from 2000 to 2009 ===
==== 2000 introduction of 055 corporate numbers ====
In 2000, Oftel started allocating 055 numbers for corporate numbering. These numbers have 10 digits. Uptake of these numbers has been low.

055 xxxx xxxx	Corporate Numbering

055 114x xxxx numbers have been used for the BT Broadband Voice service since December 2003, one of their bigger customers being Abbey (now Santander) bank.

==== 2000 introduction of 0844 and 0871 non-geographic revenue-share numbers ====
In 2000, Oftel started allocating non-geographic 0844 and 0871 revenue-share numbers. These numbers have 10 digits. Initially, uptake of these numbers was low, but increased dramatically from 2005 onwards.

0844 00x xxxx	Non-geographic special services basic rate (internet)
0844 01x xxxx to 0844 09x xxxx	currently unused
0844 1xx xxxx	currently unused
0844 2xx xxxx to 0844 9xx xxxx	Non-geographic special services basic rate (non-internet)

0871 0xx xxxx	Non-geographic special services higher rate (internet)
0871 1xx xxxx	currently unused
0871 2xx xxxx to 0871 9xx xxxx	Non-geographic special services higher rate (non-internet)

These numbers look similar to 0845 and 0870 numbers but are often charged at a different rate. From their inception until around 2005, call costs from landlines looked like this:

080x—No charge to caller
0844—Up to 5p/min from BT landlines, set by terminating operator
0845—Originating landline operator's "Local Rate"
0870—Originating landline operator's "National Rate"
0871—Up to 10p/min from BT landlines, set by terminating operator

The call price for 0844 and 0871 numbers from a BT landline is the revenue-share premium and no additional markup, by regulation. From landlines other than BT, the call price for 0844 and 0871 numbers is usually higher than from BT landlines as those other operators add their own unregulated markup on top of the revenue share.

From mobiles, 080 numbers cost from 10 to 30 pence per minute and calls to 084 and 087 numbers cost up to 50 pence per minute at that time. The revenue share is only a small proportion of the cost billed to callers when using a mobile.

After 2005, most landline providers no longer differentiated between local and national calls, charging a single geographic rate for calling 01 and 02 numbers nationwide. Many landline providers also started offering inclusive call bundles for 01 and 02 numbers and by 2011 the vast majority of landline phone users were on this type of deal. Bundled minutes from mobiles include 01, 02 and 07 numbers. Bundles effectively make all calls to 01 and 02 numbers "free" for very many people. Since 2005, it has been illegal to describe 084 numbers as "local rate" or "lo-call" or 087 numbers as "national rate".

A small number of landline providers and a smaller number of mobile providers have allowed 0870 (and a few landline providers have also allowed 0845) numbers to be used in inclusive minutes bundles. However, 0844 and 0871 numbers are never inclusive. From landlines, 084 and 087 numbers cost anything up to 20 pence per minute. From mobile phones, 084 and 087 numbers cost anything up to 45 pence per minute. The price includes a revenue-share "premium" or "service charge" of up to 5 pence per minute for 0844 numbers and up to 10 pence per minute for 0871 numbers. The premium is passed on to the terminating telecoms company.

Due to persistent abuse of 0871 numbers these have been under the remit of the Phone-paid Services Authority (previously known as ICSTIS and PhonepayPlus) since 2009.

In 2013/2014, the Consumer Rights Directive will make 084, 087 and other numbers charged at above geographic rate, illegal to use for customer service and complaints lines.

==== 2001 introduction of 091x premium rate numbers ====
In 2001, additional premium rate numbers in the 091x range started to be allocated. Initially just 0911, but latterly also 0912 and 0913.

091x xxx xxxx	Premium rate content services

09 numbers were regulated first by ICSTIS and then after 2007 by PhonepayPlus.

==== 2002 introduction of 118 xxx numbers to replace 192 directory enquiries ====
Until 2002, the domestic directory enquiries service within the UK had been reached by dialling 192 from a landline. The service had been run solely by BT. In December 2002, the market was opened up by Oftel for new providers to run additional directory enquiries services in competition. BT's 192 service moved to 118 500, and dialling 192 ceased working in August 2003. New providers used 118 118, 118 247, 118 855 and many others. Nowadays there are more than a hundred such providers and more than 130 different tariffs.

118 xxx	Directory Enquiries (DQ)

As with 09xx premium rate numbers, the usage of 118 xxx directory enquiry numbers was regulated by ICSTIS (later PhonepayPlus).

==== 2003 new 0908 numbers for adult services ====
In 2003, the 0908 number range came into use, as 0909 was now almost fully allocated.

0908 xxx xxxx 0909 xxx xxxx	Sexual entertainment services

==== 2003 area name changes ====
In 2003, Oftel published a proposal to create a National Telephone Numbering Plan. This draft plan proposed changing the names of many areas from whatever name BT had previously used. Following responses from BT, C&W and others, the final plan was published with a number of amendments incorporated, followed by a minor revision a few weeks later. A few months later, the data and the responsibility for maintaining it was passed to Ofcom.

Ofcom's data is contained in two files: the NTNP PDF file (updated several times per year) and the SABC CSV file for electronic download (published weekly). Although the data in these files should be identical, there have been and still are very many differences between them.

In one background document from 2004, Ofcom states that In order to conform to the National Telephone Numbering Plan (NTNP), the names of the following Geographic Area Codes have changed - 1248, 1268, 1275, 1276, 1291, 1293, 1306, 1322, 1327, 1334, 1344, 1354, 1356, 1375, 1384, 1394, 1425, 1438, 1442, 1451, 1454, 1461, 1470, 1471, 1477, 1478, 1485, 1488, 1489, 1491, 1543, 1561, 1562, 1582, 1588, 1598, 1661, 1668, 1675, 1680, 1681, 1684, 1688, 1689, 1695, 1707, 1720, 1727, 1737, 1744, 1753, 1770, 1784, 1806, 1821, 1856, 1870, 1877, 1883, 1885, 1889, 1895, 1908, 1920, 1922, 1926, 1928, 1932, 1952, 1953, 1963, 1980, 1983, 1984, 1992.

However, several of the above area codes did not see any name change. It had been proposed to change some names but in the end either the original BT name continued to be used or a completely new name suggested by either BT or C&W, or by both, was adopted. The Ofcom proposal also contained a large number of spelling mistakes in the proposed area code names. Some of those errors were rectified within weeks or months, while others have still not been fixed eight years later. Additionally, several other areas changed their name after suggestions by BT and/or C&W, although Ofcom originally had no plans to change them. There are also several areas which changed name but are not listed above. Additionally some names were changed in one Ofcom document but were not updated in the other Ofcom document until several years later. Some have still not been updated or corrected.

Nine more place names were fixed in a reissued NTNP PDF document in mid-December 2011.

==== 2003 responsibility for UK telecommunications passed from Oftel to Ofcom ====
In 2003, the Office of Telecommunications (Oftel) was disbanded and replaced with the Office of Communications (Ofcom).

==== 2004 additional number ranges within existing ELNS areas ====
In 2004, Ofcom allocated the remaining number ranges within the 14 existing ELNS areas.

"ELNS" area code	"ELNS" area code name	Local number length	Local numbers begin (2004 onwards)	Local numbers begin (until 2004)
01229	Barrow-in-Furness (BA)	6	2, 4, 5, 6, 8	4, 5, 6, 8
01229	Millom	6	3, 7, 9	7
01339	Aboyne	6	2, 3, 5, 8	8
01339	Ballater	6	4, 6, 7, 9	7
01388	Bishop Auckland	6	3, 4, 6, 7, 8, 9	3, 4, 6, 7, 8, 9
01388	Stanhope	6	2, 5	5
01423	Boroughbridge	6	3, 4, 9	3, 9
01423	Harrogate (HA)	6	2, 5, 6, 7, 8	2, 5, 7, 8
01430	Market Weighton	6	6, 7, 8, 9	8
01430	North Cave	6	2, 3, 4, 5	4
01434	Bellingham	6	2, 4, 9	2
01434	Haltwhistle	6	3, 5	3
01434	Hexham (HE)	6	6, 7, 8	6, 7, 8
01437	Clynderwen [Clunderwen]	6	2, 3, 4, 5	5
01437	Haverfordwest (HF)	6	6, 7, 8, 9	7, 8, 9
01507	Alford (Lincs)	6	4, 8, 9	4, 8
01507	Louth (LO)	6	3, 6, 7	3, 6
01507	Horncastle	6	2, 5	5
01686	Llanidloes	6	2, 3, 4, 7	4
01686	Newtown (NT)	6	5, 6, 8, 9	6, 8
01847	Thurso (TH)	6	2, 3, 4, 5, 8	5, 8
01847	Tongue	6	6, 7, 9	6
01851	Great Bernera	6	4, 6, 9	6
01851	Stornoway	6	2, 3, 5, 7, 8	7, 8
01890	Ayton	6	5, 6, 7, 9	7
01890	Coldstream	6	2, 3, 4, 8	2, 3, 8
01964	Hornsea	6	2, 5, 8, 9	5
01964	Withernsea	6	3, 4, 6, 7	6
01975	Alford (Aberdeen)	6	2, 4, 5, 9	5
01975	Strathdon	6	3, 6, 7, 8	6

==== 2004 additional number ranges within existing mixed areas ====
In 2004, Ofcom allocated the remaining number ranges within the existing 18 "mixed" areas.

"Mixed" area code	"Mixed" area code name	Local number length	Local numbers begin (2004 onwards)	Local numbers begin (until 2004)	Short local numbers begin
01387	Dumfries (DU)	6	2, 4-9	2, 7-9	-
0138 73	Langholm	5	2-9	2-9	-
01524	Lancaster (LA)	5 or 6	3-9	3-8	32-37, 39, 60-69
0152 42	Hornby-with-Farleton	5	2-9	2-9	-
01539	Kendal (KE)	6	2-3, 7-9	7-8	-
0153 94	Hawkshead	5	2-9	2-9	-
0153 95	Grange-over-Sands	5	2-9	2-9	-
0153 96	Sedbergh	5	2-9	2-9	-
01697	Brampton - North West (NW)	6	2, 5-6, 8-9	none (Note: Area code 01697 first appeared in the 2004 number plan without consultation or announcement. Brampton correctly documented as 5-digit area code 016977 in all other Oftel/Ofcom data at this time.)	-
0169 73	Wigton	5	2-9	2-9	-
0169 74	Raughton Head	5	2-9	2-9	-
0169 77	Brampton	4 or 5	2-9	2-5	2-3
01768	Penrith (PN)	5 or 6	2, 5-6, 8-9	2, 6, 8	882-884, 886-888
0176 83	Appleby-in-Westmorland	5	2-9	2-9	-
0176 84	Pooley Bridge	5	2-9	2-9	-
0176 87	Keswick	5	2-9	2-9	-
01946	Whitehaven (WH)	5 or 6	2-6, 8-9	5, 6, 8	61-68
0194 67	Gosforth	5	2-9	2-9	-

==== 2004 introduction of 056 VoIP numbers ====
In 2004, Ofcom started allocating 056 numbers for VoIP services. Soon after, VoIP services also appeared on geographic 01 and 02 numbers. Uptake of 056 numbers remains low. These numbers have 10 digits.

056 xxxx xxxx	LIECS (Location Independent Electronic Communications Services), e.g. VoIP services

==== 2005 to present day: new allocations within existing 02x areas ====
These are detailed as extra entries within the Big Number Change section above.

==== 2005 removal of unused 09xx broadband services from number plan ====
Some years earlier, 092x to 099x had been designated "broadband services". With changes in technology, this allocation had never been used. It was removed from the plan in 2005.

~~092x xxx xxxx to 099x xxx xxxx~~	~~Broadband services~~

==== 2005 adult premium rate services begin using 098x numbers ====
With calls for premium rate adult services to be more clearly defined and separated from other premium rate services, the 0908 and 0909 codes were to be no longer issued for new services. Instead, the new 098x range would be used, initially 0982 but latterly also 0983, 0984 and 0989.

0908 xxx xxxx 0909 xxx xxxx	Sexual entertainment services (not available for new allocations)
098x xxx xxxx	Sexual entertainment services

Some companies had attempted to avoid restrictions placed on Premium Rate Services by instead running adult services on various 070, 0871 and other number ranges. Regulations were eventually drafted to force these services to use only the designated 098x (and pre-existing 0908 and 0909) numbers.

==== 2005 NHS banned from using 0870 and 09xx numbers ====
For detailed information see Non-geographic telephone numbers in the United Kingdom § Healthcare

Due to concerns raised by patients having to pay unfair costs when calling NHS services by telephone, the usage of 0870 non-geographic numbers was banned by the Department of Health in 2005. At that time, 0870 numbers often cost more to call than geographic 01 and 02 numbers and were not usually included in bundled minutes. Around 400 GP surgeries used 0870 numbers and were also coming under greater scrutiny with a few reverting to geographic numbers.

Many of these services quickly moved to 0845 or 0844 revenue share numbers as they were not specifically banned, even though they also cost more to call than 01 and 02 numbers and in many cases cost more to call than 0870 numbers. Even as late as 2010 there were NHS bodies only now just getting around to complying with that ban.

==== 2006 ASA start taking action against misleading price indications for 084 and 087 numbers ====
In 2006, the Advertising Standards Authority (ASA) started taking action against companies that falsely represent that "084 numbers are 'local rate' [sic] or 'lo-call' [sic] calls" or "087 numbers are 'national rate' [sic] calls". By this time, most operators no longer offered a "local call" rate, instead charging all calls to 01 and 02 numbers at the same rate, whatever the distance.

After 2005, several operators also offered 01, 02 and the newly created 03 numbers as "free minutes" within an "evening and weekend" calls bundle or within an "anytime" calls bundle. As 084 and 087 numbers were not usually included in any such bundle, costing up to 20p/min from landlines and up to 41p/min from mobiles, describing these numbers as anything other than "chargeable with an additional service charge" (or "premium" by another name) is a misleading price indication. In comparison, for many callers, calls to 01, 02 and 03 numbers had effectively become "free".

==== 2006 new 075xx mobile numbers introduced ====
As a result of ever increasing mobile phone ownership, and especially the introduction of mobile broadband in the UK, the 075xx number range was opened in October 2006. This joined the existing 07624, 077xx, 078xx and 079xx ranges.

075xx xxxxxx	Mobile telephones

==== 2006 introduction of 101 for non-emergency calls to the police ====
In 2006, the new 101 number for non-emergency calls to the police began trials in several areas with a call cost of 10 pence per call. The number was adopted nationally in 2011/2012, with a charge of 15p per call, except from payphones. The charge was scrapped in April 2020 and calls to 101 are now free from all UK landlines, mobiles and payphones.

101	Police (non-emergency)

==== 2007 introduction of 03 non-geographic numbers ====
In February 2007, Ofcom announced the 03 range of numbers was being brought into use and the first numbers were issued in May. Although allocated as non-geographic, these were to be charged at the same rate as geographic 01 and 02 numbers from both landline and mobile and were also to be included within "free minutes" bundles for subscribers with a call package. Further details are in the 03 numbers section above.

030x xxx xxxx	For qualifying public bodies and non-profit organisations as defined by Ofcom
033x xxx xxxx	For any end user
034x xxx xxxx	Migration range for operators who have 084x numbers
037x xxx xxxx	Migration range for operators who have 087x numbers

==== 2007 new 0843 and 0872 non-geographic revenue-share numbers ====
In May 2007, Ofcom allocated the first 0872 numbers. These follow on from the earlier 0871 code which was now fully allocated.

In November 2007, the first 0843 numbers were allocated. These follow on from the earlier, and now fully allocated, 0844 code.

0843 xxx xxxx	Non-geographic special services basic rate
0872 xxx xxxx	Non-geographic special services higher rate

These are used for revenue share services and are generally not included in bundled minutes from either mobiles or landlines. From landlines these numbers cost anything up to 20 pence per minute and from mobile phones anything up to 45 pence per minute. The price includes a revenue-share "premium" or "service charge" of up to 5 pence per minute for 0843 numbers and up to 10 pence per minute for 0872 numbers. The premium is passed on to the terminating telecoms company.

Ofcom also indicated that 0842 and 0873 will follow on from these allocations at a later date.

Due to continued misuse of the 0871 and 0872 number ranges, ICSTIS consulted on additional regulation in 2006 and announced in 2007 that both number ranges were to be regulated from 2008. After some delay they were eventually taken into the jurisdiction of PhonepayPlus in 2009. PhonepayPlus replaced ICSTIS in 2007 and is now known as the Phone-paid Services Authority.

==== 2008 new area code: 01987 Ebbsfleet ====
In 2008, a new area code was created for Ebbsfleet. Adjacent area codes no longer had enough projected spare capacity for the new development to use, so 01987 was allocated.

01987 xxxxxx	Ebbsfleet

==== 2009 Reform of 070 personal numbering ====
Ofcom had previously considered that personal numbers should migrate to 06, to replace the 070 prefix that is sometimes confused with mobile phone numbers. There is no cap on retail caller charges. Ofcom wanted 070 and 06 numbers to have a price cap, and 07 numbers to be used exclusively for mobile phones.

Companies such as Hospedia (formerly Patientline) use 070 personal numbers. After an in-depth study to better understand the market, Ofcom has changed its mind and is now proposing to drop the 060 migration concept and decided that the forced migration to 060 is no longer seen to be objectively justifiable. Premium rate and other such services were also banned from using 070 numbers.

==== 2009 introduction of 116 xxx numbers ====
In 2009, Ofcom introduced the first harmonised European numbers for harmonised services of social value, and additional numbers were allocated in 2010.

Number	Usage	Year introduced	Service provider	Communications provider
116 000	Hotline for missing children	2009	Missing People	BT
116 006	Helpline for victims of crime	2010		
116 111	Child helplines	2009	NSPCC	BT
116 117	Non-emergency medical on-call service	2010		
116 123	Emotional Support Helplines	2009	Samaritans	BT

==== 2009 new 074xx mobile numbers introduced ====
As a result of ever increasing mobile phone and mobile broadband ownership, the 074xx number range was opened in July 2009. This joined the existing 075xx, 07624, 077xx, 078xx and 079xx ranges.

074xx xxxxxx	Mobile telephones

==== 2009 revenue-share no longer allowed on 0870 non-geographic (and 070 personal) numbers ====
After a sustained period of abuse, revenue share was removed from 0870 and 070 numbers. Prices for calling 0870 numbers from landlines fell and some landline providers started to allow calls to 0870 numbers to appear within call-plan inclusive minutes. Revenue-share continued on 0843, 0844, 0845, 0871 and 0872 numbers.

It was anticipated that 0845 numbers would also lose their revenue share, leading BT to prematurely include these numbers within call plans. Ofcom changed their mind and the status of 0845 numbers wasn't changed. Instead, in 2010 to 2012, Ofcom eventually consulted on re-organisation of the whole of the 084 and 087 number ranges.

==== 2009 PhonepayPlus begins regulation of 0871 and 0872 numbers ====
After ICSTIS consultation in 2006 and 2007 numbers beginning 0871 (and 0872) began to be regulated by PhonepayPlus, the premium rate services regulator from 1 August 2009. This brings regulation in line with existing 09xx premium rate services, 070 personal numbers and 118 xxx directory enquiries. ICSTIS became PhonepayPlus on 15 October 2007. 0871 and 0872 numbers retained their revenue-share status.

=== Changes from 2010 to 2019 ===
==== 2010 GPs banned from using 0844 (and other 084x and 087x) numbers ====
For detailed information see Non-geographic telephone numbers in the United Kingdom § GPs banned from using 0844 (and other 084x and 087x) numbers in 2010

In December 2009, the Department of Health published directions to NHS bodies concerning the cost of telephone calls made by patients to the NHS: "An NHS body must not enter into, renew or extend a contract or other arrangement for telephone services unless it is satisfied that, having regard to the arrangement as a whole, persons will not pay more to make relevant calls to the NHS body then they would to make equivalent calls to a geographic number." This reiterated the "free at the point of delivery" principle of the NHS and the direction applied to all NHS bodies. In April 2010, the Department of Health introduced new GMS (General Medical Services) contracts so that GPs would now also be covered by the earlier direction. From this point on, the more than 6500 GP surgeries in England and Wales were banned from using phone numbers that "cost more than calling a geographic number", and given one year to comply. However, some GPs continued to use 0844 numbers.

==== 2010 introduction of 111 for non-emergency calls to NHS ====
In 2010, 111 was introduced on a trial basis for non-urgent calls to the NHS. The scheme was rolled out nationally from 2013 and has replaced the NHS Direct 0845 46 47 line (in England and Wales) and the NHS 24 08454 24 24 24 line (in Scotland).

111	NHS 111 (non-emergency calls)

==== 2010 additional number ranges within 0191 area code ====
Extra capacity assigned in late 2010, following consultation.

Official designation	Number ranges 2011 onwards	Number ranges 1980s - 2010
Tyneside	2, 4, 6, 8	2, 4, 6
Durham	3, 9	3
Sunderland	5, 7	5

In the other 01x1 area codes, only (0121) 8xx, (0121) 9xx, (0131) 9xx and (0161) 5xx have yet to be allocated. 0171 and 0181 are no longer in use and 0101 and 0111 have never been allocated.

==== 2010 Ofcom propose changes in number conservation areas ====
In November 2010, Ofcom proposed to abandon renumbering in areas running short of capacity and instead provide extra capacity by starting to use local numbers beginning '0' and '1', and removing the option of dialling locally using just the subscriber number. Once the supply of new numbers released by this measure is exhausted Ofcom propose introducing additional, overlay area codes to run in tandem with current codes. It is anticipated that the overlay codes would not be required before 2022.

==== 2011 area name changes ====
By way of an Erratum to the National Telephone Numbering Plan, Ofcom started the lengthy process of correcting some very old errors for nine area code names in December 2011.

Some of these errors first appeared in the 2003 version of the number plan while others can also be found in older data originally produced by Oftel several years before.

As noted on Ofcom's site, the name changes still have to go through a formal consultation process, even though they are only correcting obvious spelling, hyphenation and capitalisation mistakes.

The corrections are as follows:

Area code	Corrected geographic area name (2012 onwards)	Geographic area names with spelling errors (before 2003, until 2011)
01271	Barnstaple	Barnstable [sic]
01284	Bury St Edmunds	Bury-St-Edmunds [sic]
01286	Caernarfon	Caernarvon [sic]
01289	Berwick-upon-Tweed	Berwick-on-Tweed [sic]
0153 95	Grange-over-Sands	Grange-Over-Sands [sic]
01559	Llandysul	Llandyssul [sic]
01877	Callander	Callandar [sic]
01889	Rugeley	Rugely [sic]
01934	Weston-super-Mare	Weston-Super-Mare [sic]

==== 2012 changes in local dialling ====
In November 2012, local dialling was removed for calls within the 01202 area allowing subscriber numbers beginning 0 or 1 to be issued locally and buying more time before an additional area code or code change is required.

==== 2013 ban on use of 084, 087 and 09 numbers by public services ====
On 26 December 2013, the Cabinet Office published guidance for central government departments, their agencies and private partners and other public sector organisations. It recommended replacement of premium rate 084 and 087 numbers with cheaper 03 numbers. The guidance advised against using 09 numbers. It also required departments to produce an annual report showing levels of compliance.

The first reports were published towards the end of 2014.

==== 2013 changes in 080, 084 and 087 non-geographic arrangements ====
After initial consultation in 2010 and 2012, in April 2013 Ofcom published the final consultation on proposals to re-arrange the 080, 084 and 087 non-geographic allocations in 2014.

The 0870 range is to regain its revenue share status. Where users of 0870 numbers cannot justify revenue share they are advised to move to their reserved matching 0370 number. The workings of the 0845 range will broadly align with how 0844 and 0843 revenue share numbers already work.

Changes in how call costs for 084 and 087 non-geographic calls should in future be communicated to callers were announced. The callers phone line provider has to list a single Access Charge per tariff for the 084, 087, 09 and 118 non-geographic number ranges and the called party has to display the single Service Charge (or "premium") details for their non-geographic number.

Calls to the 'free to caller' 080 range were made free from mobile telephones, not just from landlines.

After the final announcements were made by Ofcom in the summer of 2013, the changes had an 18-month transition period before coming into effect.

==== 2014 local number dialing ====
In October 2014 certain area codes required the full area code even when dialing local numbers. The areas affected were:

- Aberdeen (01224)
- Bradford (01274)
- Brighton (01273)
- Middlesbrough (01642)
- Milton Keynes (01908)

The change was in response to a lack of free numbers in these areas. By requiring the area code for all local calls, Ofcom are able to allocate numbers starting with 1 or 0. This increases the number of telephone numbers available without requiring a number change.

==== 2015 UK Calling legislation ====
On 1 July 2015, Ofcom made a number of changes to the way phone calls to UK service numbers would be charged. The cost of calls made to service numbers is now split into two parts: an access charge and a service charge. Under the new legislation, which was promoted by an information campaign entitled UK Calling, call charges must be clearly stated on all materials that advertise a service number. The 1 July changes also saw ‘freephone numbers’ 0800 and 0808 become free to call from both mobiles and landlines. 0500 numbers remained chargeable as previously from mobiles (free from landlines, also as previously), but these numbers were migrated to a new 0808 5 number range in June 2017, and are free from mobiles.

==== 2015 ban on use of 084, 087 and 09 numbers by financial services ====
On 23 July 2015, the Financial Conduct Authority published rules covering financial services such as banks, card companies and insurers, banning the use of premium rate 084, 087 and 09 numbers for customer contact. The regulations came into force on 26 October 2015.

The relevant publications are FCA Policy Statement 15/19, Chapter 3 and FCA regulations GEN 7.2 and DISP 1.3.

==== 2017 removal of 0500 numbers from number plan ====
Following a consultation held in 2014, after three years notice all 0500 numbers ceased working by 5 June 2017, and this number range was removed from the number plan. Users of 0500 xxxxxx numbers had been offered a simple migration to matching numbers starting 0808 5xx xxxx, thereby retaining the final six digits of the old number.

~~0500 xxxxxx~~	~~Freephone (from landline) services~~

==== 2019 changes to Controlled Premium Rate Services regulation ====
With the increasing prevalence of Information, Connection and/or Signposting Services (ICSS), especially on the 084 number range, and the increasing consumer harm arising, regulations were changed so that all such services were regulated as Controlled Premium Rate Services (CPRS) from 16 January 2019, irrespective of call charge or number range used. Ofcom's Premium Rate Services Condition was amended to bring this into effect.

==== 2019 price cap on the Service Charge for numbers starting 118 ====
On 1 April 2019, Ofcom introduced a price cap (on the Service Charge element of the call cost) of £3.65 per 90 seconds of a call on calls to Directory Enquiries numbers starting 118. This led to the withdrawal of a number of Service Charge price points from use.

==== 2019 Ofcom cap on termination rates for calls to 070 Personal Numbers ====
On 1 October 2019, Ofcom capped the termination rate (also known as the wholesale rate) for Personal Numbers starting 070 to be the same as the rate for calls to mobile numbers (at the time, less than 0.5p per minute) starting 071 to 075 and 077 to 079 to eliminate Wangiri and other scams on this number range, and reduce bill-shock. Previously the termination rate had been up to 45p per minute or more for some 070 numbers, with retail charges up to several pounds per minute.

One effect of this change is that these calls are no longer regulated as Controlled Premium Rate Services from that date onwards, as these numbers no longer meet the "10p per minute, or more, charge for the service" regulatory threshold.

Ofcom expects retail telecoms providers to include calls to Personal Numbers starting 070 in inclusive allowances on the same basis as calls to UK mobile numbers, or otherwise charge calls to 070 numbers at the same rate as a call to a UK mobile number.

Ofcom later reported that scams on the 070 number range fell by 75% in the year following this change.

=== Changes since 2020 ===
==== 2020 Introduction of 119 ====
On 18 May 2020, 119 was introduced at the request of the UK Government to provide a dedicated number for calls to the NHS in England and Wales relating to the Covid-19 coronavirus pandemic response. Calls to 119 are free of charge.

119	NHS Covid-19 response

==== 2021 Introduction of 159 ====
The number 159 ('Call 159') has been introduced to give a standard number for calling bank anti-fraud helplines, in an effort to reduce scams where people are tricked into calling someone pretending to be their bank. Calls are charged at the same rate as calling an 01 or 02 number.

159	Report bank scams

==== 2024 removal of 082 number range from number plan ====
Following a consultation held in 2024, the obsolete 082 number range was removed from the national telephone numbering plan on 11 October 2024.

~~082x xxx xxxx~~	~~Internet for schools (10-digit numbers)~~

==== 2025 end of CPRS regulation for internet dialler-operated services ====
All internet dialler-operated services irrespective of call cost or prefix used were regulated as Controlled Premium Rate Services until Ofcom ended this regulation on 1 February 2025.

==== 2025 Regulation of CPRS transferred from PSA to Ofcom ====
Regulation of Controlled Premium Rate Services (CPRS) passed from the Phone-paid Services Authority (PSA) back to Ofcom from 1 February 2025.

On 31 January 2025, Ofcom officially withdrew their approval of PSA's Code 15. On 1 February 2025, Ofcom's Regulation of Premium Rate Services Order 2024 came into effect to replace it.

== Misconceptions ==
It is a common misconception that London still has more than one area code (i.e. "0207", "0208" and even the later "0203" and "0204", which were the pre-1995 codes for Coventry and Bolton respectively). This is incorrect in the sense that omitting the "0207" or "0208" (area) code will give a local number that cannot be connected as it is missing the first digit. Therefore, writing a London number as 020x xxx xxxx is incorrect and can lead to confusion when attempting to dial it.

The misconception of area code and number separation is also seen in other areas of the country where the area code length was reduced in the Big Number Change such as Coventry being written as 02476 xxxxxx, whereas the correct number sequence is (024) 76xx xxxx (Coventry now has some (024) 77xx xxxx and (024) 75xx xxxx numbers) and Cardiff being written as 02920 xxxxxx whereas the correct number sequence is (029) 20xx xxxx (Cardiff now has some (029) 21xx xxxx and (029) 22xx xxxx numbers).

Likewise in Portsmouth, numbers are being incorrectly written as 02392 xxxxxx, whereas the correct number sequence is (023) 92xx xxxx (Portsmouth now has some (023) 93xx xxxx numbers).

This also occurs in some areas of Northern Ireland, that previously had 5-digit and 6-digit local numbers as in Banbridge (previously (018206) xxxxx), where numbers erroneously written as 028406 xxxxx instead of (028) 406x xxxx are occasionally seen. Locals still heard misquoting the area code as 028406, more than two decades after the change. The same occurs in formerly six-digit code areas, such as Lisburn (previous (01846) xxxxxx) continues to appear as 02892 xxxxxx instead of the correct form (028) 92xx xxxx.

This is also seen in the earlier PhONEday areas, such as in Sheffield, for (0114) 2xx xxxx numbers, where these are often seen written as 01142 xxxxxx or are missing the leading digit 2 when abbreviated (751234 instead of 275 1234 for example). This is a particular problem now that (0114) 3xx xxxx local numbers are being issued.

It also affects Reading numbers where these are still being written as 01189 xxxxxx, whereas the correct number sequence is (0118) 9xx xxxx. Now that Reading has some (0118) 3xx xxxx, (0118) 4xx xxxx and (0118) 2xx xxxx numbers mis-dialling also occurs when people prefix 3xx xxxx, 4xx xxxx and 2xx xxxx numbers with 01189 instead of just 0118.

In all of these areas, the result of the confusion is that callers are adding an incorrect area code to numbers allocated within the new local number ranges, and that then results in a mis-dialled call.
