= Area codes 318 and 457 =

Area code in northern and central Louisiana, United States

Coordinates: 32°06′N 92°30′W

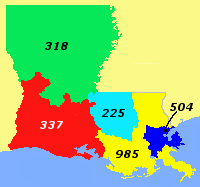
Numbering plan areas of Louisiana from 1999 to 2025

Area codes 318 and 457 are telephone area codes in the North American Numbering Plan (NANP) for the northern and central parts of the U.S. state of Louisiana. Area code 318 was assigned in 1957 in an area code split of the 504 numbering plan area (NPA) to nearly all of the state west of the Mississippi River, stretching from the Gulf of Mexico north to the border with Arkansas. After a reduction of the numbering plan area in 1999, in which the southern half of 318 received area code 337, the numbering plan area was converted in 2025 to an overlay complex with additional area code 457.

The 318/457 numbering plan area includes Shreveport, Bossier City, Monroe, Alexandria, Ruston and other communities in northern and central Louisiana.

== History ==
=== Temporary use in California ===
During the initial trials of direct distance dialing (DDD) in 1951, area code 318 was temporarily used as a destination code for San Francisco. Oakland and San Francisco had separate toll switches, so calls had to be routed according to the final destination in the Bay Area. As the telephone equipment used at the time handled only three-digit translation, the temporary use of a distinct area code was required to distinguish between the two cities. Area code 318 was used temporarily to specify San Francisco and areas north of the Golden Gate Bridge, while calls with destinations in Oakland or the East Bay used area code 415. When the electromechanical card-translator became available in the early 1950s, translations using six digits were possible; the 318 code was no longer required. The entire Bay Area returned to using area code 415.

=== Creation of area code 318 ===
Louisiana was originally assigned area code 504 when the North American Numbering Plan was introduced in 1947. In 1957, area code 318 was assigned in a split of Louisiana's 504 numbering plan area. The new numbering plan area covered most of Louisiana west of the Mississippi River, extending from the Gulf of Mexico to the Arkansas state line.

For more than four decades, 318 served a large part of western, northern and central Louisiana. It included major cities such as Shreveport, Monroe, Alexandria, Lafayette and Lake Charles before the 1999 split.

=== 1999 split and creation of 337 ===
In 1999, the southern portion of the 318 numbering plan area was split off to create area code 337. The split assigned 337 to southwestern and south-central Louisiana, including Lafayette, Lake Charles, New Iberia, Opelousas and other communities.

The split took effect with a permissive dialing period beginning October 11, 1999. During that period, calls could be completed using either 318 or 337. Mandatory dialing of the new area code began March 13, 2000. After the split, 318 remained in northern and central Louisiana, including Shreveport, Monroe, Alexandria and nearby communities.

=== 2025 overlay and creation of 457 ===
Further relief planning began in 2023, as 318 was expected to exhaust by early 2026. On May 5, 2023, the Louisiana Public Service Commission approved an all-services distributed overlay for the 318 numbering plan area, adding area code 457 to the same geographic region. The overlay was the first area-code overlay in Louisiana.

The 457 overlay did not require existing customers to change telephone numbers or area codes. Instead, new numbers using 457 became available in the same geographic area served by 318. NANPA stated that central office codes in the 457 NPA would be available for assignment only when all assignable prefixes in the 318 NPA had been assigned.

== Dialing procedure ==
Before the 457 overlay, local calls within the 318 area code could generally be completed with seven-digit dialing. The overlay required a transition to ten-digit dialing for local calls.

Network preparation and customer education began August 26, 2024. A permissive ten-digit dialing period began February 24, 2025, allowing local calls to be completed with either seven or ten digits. Mandatory ten-digit dialing began August 25, 2025, after which local calls using only seven digits would not be completed. New telephone lines or services using area code 457 became available beginning September 25, 2025.

Under the overlay dialing plan, local calls within the 318/457 region are dialed as ten digits. Toll calls are dialed as 1 plus the ten-digit telephone number. Operator-assisted calls, including collect, third-party and credit-card calls, are dialed as 0 plus the ten-digit number.

The Louisiana Public Service Commission said that the overlay did not change existing telephone numbers, local calling areas, prices, coverage areas or other rates and services. Three-digit services such as 9-1-1, 9-8-8, 2-1-1, 3-1-1, 4-1-1, 5-1-1, 6-1-1, 7-1-1 and 8-1-1 remained available where offered.

== Service area ==
The 318/457 overlay region covers northern and central Louisiana. It includes cities and towns in the Ark-La-Tex, the Red River region, the Ouachita River region and parts of central Louisiana.

- Alexandria
- Bastrop
- Bossier City
- Boyce
- Bunkie
- Dixie Inn
- Ferriday
- Farmerville
- Homer
- Jonesboro
- Mansfield
- Many
- Marksville
- Minden
- Monroe
- Natchitoches
- Rayville
- Ruston
- Rosefield
- Saint Joseph
- Sarepta
- Shreveport
- Simmesport
- Springhill
- Tallulah
- Vidalia
- Waterproof
- West Monroe
- Winnfield
- Winnsboro

== See also ==
- List of Louisiana area codes
- List of North American Numbering Plan area codes

Louisiana area codes: 225, 318/457, 337, 504, 985
	North: 327/870	
West: 409, 430/903, 936	318/457	East: 601/769, 662
	South: 225, 337	
Arkansas area codes: 479, 501, 870/327
Mississippi area codes: 228, 601/769, 471/662
Texas area codes: 210/726, 214/469/972/945, 254, 325, 361, 409, 432, 512/737, 713/281/832/346, 806, 817/682, 830, 903/430, 915, 936, 940, 956, 979
