= Area codes 202 and 771 =

Area codes for Washington, D.C.

Coordinates: 38°54′N 77°2′W

The red area is the District of Columbia, served by area codes 202 and 771.

Area codes 202 and 771 are telephone area codes in the North American Numbering Plan (NANP) for Washington, D.C.

Area code 202 was one of the original North American area codes established in October 1947 by the American Telephone and Telegraph Company (AT&T). After the State of New Jersey with area code 201, the District of Columbia was the second numbering plan area (NPA). Area code 771 was added to the numbering plan area in April 2021 in creation of an overlay complex to mitigate impending telephone number shortages.

== History ==
Since the creation of the first nationwide telephone numbering plan in 1947, most of the inner ring of the Washington metropolitan area has been a single local calling area, the Washington Metropolitan Exchange Area (WMEA). This is despite the fact that the WMEA was split between three numbering plan areas (NPAs): the District's 202, 301 in southern Maryland, and 703 in northern Virginia. From the 1950s to 1990, it was possible to complete local calls in the WMEA with only seven digits. The entire WMEA was reachable via long-distance services by dialing area code 202, for which purpose AT&T Long Lines had established cross-referenced operator routing codes for all affected central offices. This scheme was implemented via a system of central office code protection, in which central offices in the three numbering plan areas could not duplicate any central office prefixes for any of the three area codes in the WMEA. For example, if the 202-574 exchange was in use in the District, the corresponding 703-574 or 301-574 exchange could only be assigned a safe distance from the metropolitan area, such as southwestern Virginia or the Eastern Shore of Maryland.

By spring 1990, C&P Telephone (later part of Bell Atlantic and now Verizon), the Regional Bell Operating Company for the District, advised the North American Numbering Plan Administration (NANPA) that the last interchangeable central office code in the area would be assigned in the second half of the year. The only remaining prefixes could not be assigned without eliminating seven-digit dialing in the region, leading C&P to terminate the central office code protection arrangement to make additional prefixes available for use. This change was implemented in a permissive dialing period from April 1, 1990, to October 1, 1990, at which time all home-NPA (HNPA) local calls maintained seven-digit dialing; all HNPA direct-dialed toll calls, required 1 and ten digits; foreign-NPA (FNPA) local calls were dialed with just the ten-digit number; FNPA direct dialed calls required dialing 1 and ten digits. Operator-assisted calls were all dialed as 0 and ten digits.

The end of central office code protection was intended to allow number blocks to be assigned in the Washington area that could not previously be assigned under the previous system. However, it did not provide enough relief to meet demand on either side of the Potomac River. By the end of 1990, the Chesapeake and Potomac Telephone Company of Maryland determined that 301 was approaching exhaustion even with the end of central office code protection. It filed to assign area code 410 to most of Maryland from the Baltimore area eastward, effective October 5, 1991. In Virginia, the delay amounted to six years, until 1996, when area code 540 was installed for the western portion of the old 703 territory; permissive dialing ended January 27, 1996.

The region's continued growth in the 1990s ultimately led to both suburban area codes being overlaid, with area code 240 overlaying 301 in 1997, and area code 571 overlaying 703 in 2000.

With 202 facing exhaustion in late 2022, the North American Numbering Plan Administrator announced in October 2020 the addition of area code 771 to the District of Columbia. The Public Service Commission approved a plan to phase in the new area code over a 13-month period. The installation of a second area code required transition to ten-digit dialing for all calls within the District. The overlay implementation commenced with a permissive dialing period from April 10, 2021, to October 9, 2021, during which ten-digit dialing of 202-telephone numbers was optional. The first central office code assignments for 771 took place on November 8, 2021, for central office code 777, and on November 9 for 888.

== Local calling ==
Even with the implementation of ten-digit dialing in the Washington metro, much of the Washington area is still a single local calling area. The District is the center of one of the largest toll-free calling zones in the eastern United States, covering large portions of Virginia and Maryland.

Areas such as Alexandria, Arlington, Fairfax, Falls Church, McLean and Tysons in Virginia (703/571) and Rockville, Gaithersburg, Upper Marlboro, Bethesda and Landover in Maryland (301/240) are a local call to Washington.

== See also ==
- Area code 710
- List of North American Numbering Plan area codes

District of Columbia area codes: 202/771
	North: 227/240/301	
West: 703/571	202/771	East: 301/240/227
	South: 703/571	
Maryland area codes: 301/240/227, 410/443/667
Virginia area codes: 276, 434, 540/826, 703/571, 757/948, 804/686
