= Code protection =

Code protection may refer to:

- In computing, source code protection in which proprietary code is compiled, encrypted or obfuscated to conceal its inner workings from end users or competitors.
- In embedded microprocessors, hardware copy protection schemes by which firmware programmed into a microcontroller may be executed internally but is not readable or easily duplicated.
- In telephony, exchange code protection to prevent the same number being assigned in two small border communities on opposite sides of a telephone area code boundary. This allows local calls between the two communities without dialling the area code.
