= Area code 225 =

Area code for Baton Rouge, Louisiana

Coordinates: 30°30′N 91°06′W

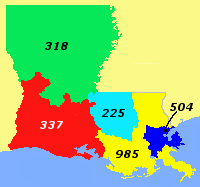
Area code 225

Area code 225 is a telephone area code in the North American Numbering Plan (NANP) for the southern part of the U.S. state of Louisiana, which includes the entire nine-parish Baton Rouge metropolitan area. The area code was created on August 17, 1998 in an area code split from area code 504. The area code was Louisiana's third area code, and the first new area code in the state in forty-one years.

The numbering plan area (NPA) comprises the parishes of Ascension, East Baton Rouge, East Feliciana, Iberville, Livingston, Pointe Coupee, St. Helena, St. James, West Baton Rouge and West Feliciana.

On a standard telephone keypad, the numbers 2-2-5 correspond to the letters C-A-J, a nod to the area's Cajun heritage. The area code has become part of the regional identity for the Baton Rouge metropolitan area; a local lifestyle and events monthly magazine is named 225.

== Service area ==
Cities in the numbering plan area include:

- Albany
- Baker
- Baton Rouge
- Brusly
- Central
- Clinton
- Convent
- Denham Springs
- Donaldsonville
- Geismar
- Gonzales
- Gramercy
- Greensburg
- Jackson
- Livingston
- Lutcher
- Maurepas
- New Roads
- Plaquemine
- Port Allen
- Prairieville
- St. Amant
- St. Francisville
- St. Gabriel
- St. George
- Springfield
- Walker
- Watson
- White Castle
- Wilson
- Zachary

== See also ==
- List of Louisiana area codes

Louisiana area codes: 225, 318/457, 337, 504, 985
	North: 601/769	
West: 318, 337	225	East: 985
	South: 985	
Mississippi area codes: 228, 601/769, 471/662
