= Area code 985 =

Telephone area codes for southeast Louisiana

Coordinates: 30°00′N 90°30′W

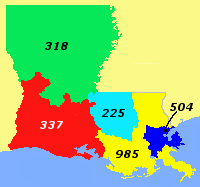
Area code 985 as of 2001–2007.

Area code 985 is the telephone area code in the North American Numbering Plan for southeastern Louisiana, excluding the inner ring of the New Orleans area. The area code was created in 2001 in an area code split of area code 504.

Area code 985 also used to include areas southeast of New Orleans. However, in 2007, these areas switched back to 504. These communities are on both sides of the Mississippi River in "lower" Plaquemines Parish, including Pointe à la Hache on the east bank, with Port Sulphur, Buras, and Boothville on the west bank. The area's local switching facilities were almost destroyed due to flooding from Hurricane Katrina. Since the nearest switching facilities were in New Orleans, it was decided to put these downriver communities back in 504. Permissive use of 504 alongside 985 to reach these areas once again began on July 29, 2007; mandatory use of 504 began on July 1, 2008.

== Service area ==
The service area includes the following cities:

- Abita Springs
- Amite
- Angie
- Bayou L'Ourse
- Berwick
- Bogalusa
- Bourg
- Boutte
- Covington
- Destrehan
- Edgard
- Folsom
- Franklinton
- Galliano
- Gibson
- Golden Meadow
- Grand Isle
- Hammond
- Houma
- Independence
- Kentwood
- Lacombe
- LaPlace
- Lockport
- Luling
- Mandeville
- Madisonville
- Morgan City
- Napoleonville
- Norco
- Patterson
- Pearl River
- Ponchatoula
- Raceland
- Reserve
- Robert
- Slidell
- Thibodaux
- Tickfaw
- Varnado

== See also ==
- List of Louisiana area codes

Louisiana area codes: 225, 318/457, 337, 504, 985
	North: 225, 601/769	
West: 225, 337	985	East: 228, 504, 601/769
	South: 504, Gulf of Mexico	
Mississippi area codes: 228, 601/769, 471/662
