= List of Mississippi area codes =

Numbering plan areas and area codes of Mississippi

The state of Mississippi is divided into three numbering plan areas, with a total of five area codes.

Area code	Year created	Parent NPA	Overlay	Numbering plan area
601	1947	–	601/769	most of southern Mississippi including Jackson.
769	2005	601	601/769	most of southern Mississippi including Jackson.
228	1997	601	–	Gulf Coast region of Mississippi
662	1999	601	471/662	northern Mississippi
471	2026	662	471/662	northern Mississippi

== See also ==
- List of North American Numbering Plan area codes
