= List of Louisiana area codes =

The U.S. state of Louisiana is divided into five geographically distinct numbering plan areas (NPAs) in the North American Numbering Plan (NANP) which are served by a total of six area codes, with one NPA being an overlay of two codes.

Area code	Year created	Parent NPA	Overlay	Numbering plan area
504	1947	–	–	New Orleans area
225	1998	504	–	Baton Rouge area and parts of south central Louisiana
318	1957	504	318/457	northern Louisiana
457	2025	318	318/457	northern Louisiana
337	1999	318	–	southwestern Louisiana
985	2001	504	–	sections of southeast Louisiana which are not within the 504 area code

== See also ==
- List of North American Numbering Plan area codes
