= Central office code protection =

Policy of the North American Numbering Plan

In the administration of the North American Numbering Plan, central office code protection is a numbering policy for maintaining local seven-digit dialing in communities that extend on both sides of the boundary line between multiple numbering plan areas (NPAs), such as in cross-border towns on state lines. Code protection prevents the use of the same telephone number on both sides by not assigning the same central office code of one NPA in the adjacent NPA.

Central office code protection was once common in communities on provincial or state boundary lines. It has been declining in use as inefficient allocation of numbering resources to the growing number of competitive local exchange carriers has caused depletion of available number prefixes, often requiring ten-digit local calls and overlay plans where multiple area codes serve the same geographic location.

Despite its advantages where a community of interest reaches across an NPA boundary, central office code protection was only acceptable as long as it could be continued without the threat of central office code exhaustion in the NPA protecting the code.

== Examples ==
The entire 506-752 prefix is assigned to Aliant Telecom (NB) and serves Campobello Island, New Brunswick. Campobello is a border community and is a local call to Lubec, Maine, in area code 207.

The 207-733 prefix serves Lubec, split between FairPoint Communications and a pair of competitors using number pooling. Both area code 506 and 207 use seven digits for local calls.

A seven-digit local call from Campobello to Lubec is possible, provided that 733-XXXX is not assigned to anything in the 506 area code which is local anywhere near Campobello. This may be done in one of two ways:

- The Canadian numbering administrator could mark +1-506-733 as "reserved" and refuse to issue it at all. This was originally the standard procedure.
- The 506-733 prefix could be dumped as far out-of-region as possible within the 506 area code boundary, if calls to the other side of the same code are long-distance and a trunk call within the area code requires the entire number (including the leading 1-506) be dialled. By dumping the 506-733 prefix in Edmundston, the geographically-furthest point still in New Brunswick, the administrator adopts this approach.

Similarly, Edmundston is local to Madawaska, Maine exchanges 207-316, 207-436 and 207-728. The corresponding 506-316, 506-436 and 506-728 prefixes (as of 2014) are not issued by the Canadian Numbering Administrator (CNAC):

506,316,,,Available,,Available outside Madawaska: Maine EAS
506,436,,,Available,,Available outside Madawaska: Maine EAS
506,728,,,Available,,Available outside Madawaska: Maine EAS

A few towns and suburbs on US state boundaries have one central office which serves both sides, using different prefixes in different area codes.

- All South Coffeyville, Oklahoma exchange prefixes are served from Coffeyville, Kansas, population 10000; the two are local to each other but long distance to everything else.
- The towns of Seekonk and Rehoboth, Massachusetts share a wire center with East Providence, Rhode Island and code protection was provided in the 401 area code until 2000, allowing Seekonk and Rehoboth subscribers (336-xxxx) to dial calls in the Providence, Rhode Island metro area with 7 digits. (Note: The exchange codes in the Providence metro area that were 7-digit dialable from the 508-336 code protection were replicated in the 508 area code from the outset. However, these were located well outside of the 7-digit local calling area for the 336 exchange and required a 1+NXX dialing pattern.) This was phased out when New England Telephone began the process of creating an overlay area code for the 508 area code. Ten-digit dialing is now required for calls crossing the area code (and state) boundary.

== Limitations ==
If code protection is implemented by reserving every seven-digit number for a border town in both (or all) of the affected area codes, that community and points in its local calling area occupy numbering resources at double the otherwise-expected rate. This is a minor drawback in small cities with large rural area codes (as the numbers can easily be assignable in distant locations), but can consume numbers rapidly in larger centers such as St. Louis or Kansas City (where such protection must be maintained throughout most or all of the area code region, reducing its lifespan).

In large cities located directly on area code boundaries (such as Ottawa-Hull in 613/819, the sixth-largest Canadian metropolitan area), this can lead to a situation where none of the many vacant prefixes can be assigned without breaking seven-digit calling across the area code boundary. Code protection in Ottawa-Hull broke down in 2006 for this reason. The 1-819 versions of Ottawa 1-613 numbers could not be assigned anywhere in western Quebec, even to areas a safe distance from the National Capital Region, such as the Eastern Townships or northwestern Quebec. Eventually, the few remaining prefixes in area code 819 could not be assigned without requiring ten-digit dialing from Ottawa to Hull.

A local calling area spanning three American or Canadian jurisdictions would require any number local to any part of the town to be reserved across all three (or more) area codes. This ultimately led to the breakdown of seven-digit calling between Washington, D.C. and its suburbs in 1991. Since the Washington local access and transport area (LATA) spills into portions of Maryland and Virginia, every number in the area that was in Maryland's area code 301 and northern Virginia's area code 703 was given a "hidden" number in the District's area code 202. However, this meant that if a central office code was in use in any portion of the metro area, it could not be used even in areas a safe distance from Washington such as southwestern Virginia or the Eastern Shore of Maryland.

Severing the border community from its exhausted home area code using a split plan may prolong the life of a seven-digit exchange code protection scheme if the piece being split off is outside the extended local calling area. Code protection is most often removed entirely in large cities if an overlay plan is implemented, as these plans break the seven-digit dialling that code protection was devised to preserve. The plan also can be expected to break down if new split-plan codes are added within a city the size of Chicago, as the city itself no longer fits into one seven-digit area.

== See also ==
- Linked numbering scheme
- Area code 202 and 301/703, Washington DC and MD/VA
- Area code 314/618, St. Louis/East St. Louis
- Area code 613/819, Ottawa-Hull
- Area code 712/605/402, Sioux City metropolitan area (three states)
- Area code 816/913, Kansas City
