= Interchangeable NPA and central office codes =

North American telephone numbering

In the North American Numbering Plan (NANP), interchangeable NPA and central office codes constituted a change in numbering plan design and policy, to mitigate exhaustion of the numbering resources of the ten-digit telephone numbers used in the closed numbering plan of the NANP.

Interchangeable numbering plan area (NPA) codes and central office codes are codes that permit any of the ten numerals in the middle position of the area code and the central office code, which both are three-digit numbers. This change in numbering format was implemented first for central office codes by 1973, which eliminated the restriction in the middle digit (2 to 9) to also permit 0 and 1. The middle position of the area code could only be 0 and 1. In 1995, this restriction for area codes was lifted as well, creating interchangeable NPA codes.

== History and background ==
The ten-digit telephone numbers of the North American Numbering Plan consist of a three-digit numbering plan area code (NPA code), written as the most-significant part of the national telephone number, followed by the three-digit central office code, and the four-digit local line or station number.

From 1947 to 1995, all NPA codes were distinguished with the digits 0 or 1 in the middle position. This provided the traditional format N 0/1 X, where N is any digit from 2 to 9, and X is any of the ten numerals. This format provided a set of 160 combinations, but only 144 were in use for geographic NPA codes. N00 and N11 were reserved for special service codes. In contrast, until 1974, central office codes had the format N N X, forbidding digits 0 and 1 in the middle position.

These formats permitted direct distinction of NPA codes from central office prefixes by examination of the second digit dialed, which was necessary for automatic recognition of seven-digit dialing for calls within the local calling area, especially with common control switching equipment. Seven-digit dialing was standardized starting in the 1940s, in preparation of Operator Toll Dialing, and later Direct Distance Dialing (DDD), and was mostly complete in all but the most isolated or rural areas by 1970. DDD service for subscribers commenced in 1951 in a trial in Englewood, New Jersey.

The Bell System engineers expected that the first numbering plan areas to require more than the 640 possible central office codes would not occur before c. 1973. The solution for expanding the numbering pool within an NPA was to remove the restriction posed by not using 0 and 1 in the middle position of central office codes. This made central office codes interchangeable.

An interchangeable NPA code and an interchangeable central office code is a code that permits any of the ten numerals in the middle position of the code.

=== Interchangeable central office codes ===
By 1971 the North American network had been prepared for operation with central office codes that permitted the digits 0 and 1 as the middle digit, i.e. with the number format NXX (less N11), where N=2–9, and X=0–9. Starting in c. 1974, large American cities (Los Angeles and New York City) began introducing office codes of this format, to keep up with demand while postponing area code splits by a few more years.

In step-by-step offices, implementation usually required dialing an extra prefix to select a long-distance trunk that could route calls dialed with an area code; 112 and 115 were early choices, but 1 became eventually common. In geographically small numbering plan areas that already were a single local calling area, it did not cause confusion in long-distance dialing, but in some cases, it became necessary to implement ten-digit dialing of long-distance calls within the same area code. This necessity was more common as interchangeable central office codes were introduced in more area codes. In the late 1980s, Bellcore, which administered the North American Numbering Plan, made it mandatory to implement interchangeable central office codes before area code relief would be approved. Thus, ten-digit dialing became more common in many area codes.

=== Interchangeable NPA codes ===
By 1990, Bellcore determined the need for interchangeable NPA codes, which would be implemented no sooner than January 1, 1995. By that date, all telephone callers, even those in area codes that did not yet have interchangeable central office codes, would be required to dial all ten digits for long-distance calls, including such calls within the same area code. Canadian telephone companies made the change in Fall 1994 outside of area code 905, which had already implemented the requirement (before the split from 416) in 1990. The implementation of interchangeable area codes added 640 new codes to the numbering pool.

The introduction of interchangeable codes required new technology for distinguishing a subscriber's intent of dialing seven or ten digits. Two methods were available, timing and extra prefixes. In the timing solution, the switching equipment would wait for more digits only for a critical time-out interval of three to five seconds. Such timing measurements were not necessary when no ambiguity existed from pretranslation. The preferred arrangement, over timing, was the prefix method, in which the subscriber had to start dialing ten-digit calls with a 0 or 1 preceding the full telephone number. The preference was based on Bell System behavioral research, but technical aspect also favored this arrangement in some cases, in that it could shorten post-dial delay with new equipment.

The first interchangeable NPA codes were area code 334 in Alabama and area code 360 in Washington state, which entered mandatory use on January 15, 1995.
