= Linked numbering scheme =

UK telephone numbering scheme

A linked numbering scheme (LNS) is a dialing procedure in effect in a service area within which call routing between adjacent exchanges does not require a dialing code. The term is only used in the United Kingdom, but not in the North American Numbering Plan.

== United Kingdom ==
The largest linked numbering scheme in the UK is that for the London telephone area, formerly known as the London Director area. Within the area, several million subscribers can call each other without dialling the 020 code. With some exceptions, anyone calling from an (020) number can reach another (020) number by dialling only the last 8 digits. The exceptions would include cases where the first digit after (020) is 0 or 1 as 0 is the national dialling prefix and 1 is reserved for short codes for accessing various services.

Smaller schemes apply outside London. Uxbridge, for example, has the subscriber trunk dialing (STD) code 01895. Uxbridge exchange is the parent for Denham, Harefield, Ruislip and West Drayton; anyone connected to any of those exchanges can call any of the others without having to prefix the number with 01895. This is achieved by giving subscriber lines on each exchange different prefix numbers, thus: all numbers are six-figure; Denham numbers start with 83, Harefield with 82, Ruislip with 6 and West Drayton with 4. Uxbridge numbers start with 2 or 81. All calls must have all six digits dialled - even if a subscriber is on Denham exchange and is calling another subscriber on Denham exchange, they must still dial 83xxxx.

Incoming calls from any other exchange for a subscriber on any of the five exchanges must all be prefixed with the same 01895 code.

== North America ==
The terminology linked numbering scheme is not used in the North American Numbering Plan (NANP).

A local call in this scheme, standardized in 1948 for the introduction of direct-dial long-distance calling, was originally dialled as a fixed-length seven-digit number and did not require an area code. In some cases, a local call to a number just across an area code boundary could be seven digits if an exchange code protection scheme prevented the same prefixes being assigned to local numbers in the other area code.

A long-distance trunk call within the same area code used to be dialable as 1 followed by seven digits, without the area code. This no longer possible everywhere in the NANP by 1995. In areas using toll alerting, where long-distance calls are identified by a trunk prefix (a leading 1-) to be distinguishable from flat-rate local calls, all toll calls must be dialled with the area code.

Some local calls require ten-digit dialling, either across area code boundaries in a split plan or within the same community in an overlay plan. This may mean that no standard numbers are reachable without dialling an area code in some localities.
