= Area code 337 =

Area code for southwestern Louisiana, United States

Coordinates: 30°18′N 92°42′W

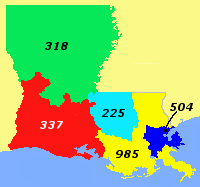
Area code 337

In the North American Numbering Plan, telephone area code 337 covers southwestern Louisiana. It was created on October 11, 1999. Before the 337 code was formed, this area was the southern half of area code 318, which had covered most of Louisiana west of the Mississippi River since 1957.

Prior to October 2021, area code 337 had telephone numbers assigned for the central office code 988. In 2020, 988 was designated nationwide as a dialing code for the National Suicide Prevention Lifeline, which created a conflict for exchanges that permit seven-digit dialing. This area code was therefore scheduled to transition to ten-digit dialing by October 24, 2021.

- Abbeville, Louisiana
- Arnaudville, Louisiana
- Baldwin, Louisiana
- Basile, Louisiana
- Breaux Bridge, Louisiana
- Broussard, Louisiana
- Cade, Louisiana
- Cameron, Louisiana
- Carencro, Louisiana
- Carlyss, Louisiana
- Cecilia, Louisiana
- Centerville, Louisiana
- Charenton, Louisiana
- Church Point, Louisiana
- Crowley, Louisiana
- Delcambre, Louisiana
- DeRidder, Louisiana
- Duson, Louisiana
- Elton, Louisiana
- Erath, Louisiana
- Eunice, Louisiana
- Franklin, Louisiana
- Grand Coteau, Louisiana
- Gueydan, Louisiana
- Henderson, Louisiana
- Iota, Louisiana
- Iowa, Louisiana
- Jeanerette, Louisiana
- Jennings, Louisiana
- Kaplan, Louisiana
- Kinder, Louisiana
- Krotz Springs, Louisiana
- Lafayette, Louisiana
- Lake Arthur, Louisiana
- Lake Charles, Louisiana
- Leesville, Louisiana
- Leonville, Louisiana
- Loreauville, Louisiana
- Mamou, Louisiana
- Maurice, Louisiana
- Melville, Louisiana
- Mermentau, Louisiana
- Merryville, Louisiana
- Moss Bluff, Louisiana
- New Iberia, Louisiana
- Oberlin, Louisiana
- Opelousas, Louisiana
- Palmetto, Louisiana
- Parks, Louisiana
- Port Barre, Louisiana
- Rayne, Louisiana
- Scott, Louisiana
- St. Martinville, Louisiana
- Sulphur, Louisiana
- Sunset, Louisiana
- Ville Platte, Louisiana
- Vinton, Louisiana
- Washington, Louisiana
- Welsh, Louisiana
- Westlake, Louisiana
- Youngsville, Louisiana

== See also ==
- List of Louisiana area codes

Louisiana area codes: 225, 318/457, 337, 504, 985
	North: 318	
West: 409	337	East: 225, 985
	South: Gulf of Mexico	
Texas area codes: 210/726, 214/469/972/945, 254, 325, 361, 409, 432, 512/737, 713/281/832/346, 806, 817/682, 830, 903/430, 915, 936, 940, 956, 979
