= Area code 504 =

Telephone area code for New Orleans, Louisiana

Coordinates: 29°42′N 89°48′W

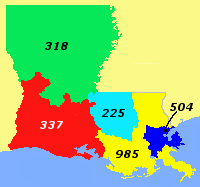
Area code 504 as of after 2007.

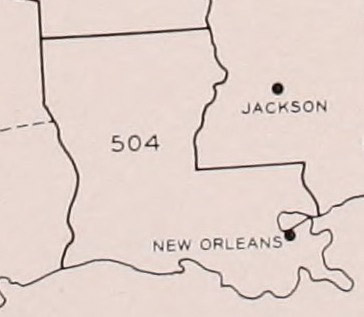
Area code 504 as of 1947–1957.

Area code 504 is a telephone area code in the North American Numbering Plan (NANP) for the New Orleans metropolitan area in the U.S. state of Louisiana. 504 was one of the eighty-six original North American area codes created in 1947, and originally served all of Louisiana.

== History ==
Established in 1947, area code 504 was the sole area code allocated to Louisiana until 1957. In 1957, most of the state west of the Mississippi River was reassigned with area code 318.

In 1998, the western portion of the numbering plan area, including Baton Rouge, was renumbered with area code 225 in an area code split. In 2001, much of southeastern Louisiana was split off with area code 985, to both the west and the north of 504.

Several of New Orleans' downriver suburbs switched to 985 in 2001 as well. However, much of this area switched back to 504 in 2007. These communities are now being served with dialtone from telephone switching facilities in New Orleans following near-total destruction of local switching facilities due to flooding from Hurricane Katrina. Permissive dialing of 504 alongside 985 in this area began on July 29, 2007. Mandatory use of 504 to again reach these communities began on May 1, 2008. These communities are on both sides of the Mississippi River in lower Plaquemines Parish, including Pointe à la Hache on the east bank, with Port Sulphur, Buras, and Boothville on the west bank.

Prior to October 2021, area code 504 had telephone numbers assigned for the central office code 988. In 2020, 988 was designated nationwide as a dialing code for the National Suicide Prevention Lifeline, which created a conflict for exchanges that permit seven-digit dialing. This area code was therefore scheduled to transition to ten-digit dialing by October 24, 2021.

== Service area ==
In addition to the city of New Orleans (Orleans Parish), the numbering plan area includes all of St. Bernard and Plaquemines parishes and most of Jefferson Parish.

== Popular culture ==
The area code inspired the name for the local jazz record label 504 Records, as well as the rap group 504 Boyz and the Old 97's song "504" on Hitchhike to Rhome. Rapper 504, who has heritage in New Orleans, uses this as his stage name as well. Also the area code 504 was mentioned in Drake's hit song "Practice", from his album Take Care. It has also been mentioned by Lil' Wayne due to his upbringing in the 504, specifically Hollygrove. The Soul Rebels also have a song called "504" about their hometown on their 2012 EP, Unlock Your Mind. Their track "Greatness" from the 2019 album Poetry in Motion also has a lyrical reference to the area code. The New Orleanian Hot 8 Brass Band also reference the area code in their song "New Orleans After The City", which appeared on the soundtrack for the television series Treme.

On Monday Night Football on December 16, 2019, New Orleans Saints quarterback Drew Brees threw his 540th career touchdown pass, breaking Peyton Manning’s record for most career touchdown passes in NFL history. When Brees broke the record, announcer Joe Tessitore said “540 in the 504!”, referencing the area code.

== See also ==
- List of Louisiana area codes

Louisiana area codes: 225, 318/457, 337, 504, 985
	North: 985	
West: 985	504	East: Gulf of Mexico
	South: 985	
