= Seven-digit dialing =

Telephone dialing procedure

Seven-digit dialing is a telephone dialing procedure customary in some territories of the North American Numbering Plan (NANP) for dialing telephone numbers in the same numbering plan area (NPA). NANP telephone numbers consist of 10 digits, of which the leading three are the area code. In seven-digit dialing it is not necessary to dial the area code. The procedure is also sometimes known as local format or network format.

== History ==
Originally, telephone exchanges consisted of manual switchboards operated by switchboard operators. Telephone numbers had typically two to four digits, depending on the size of the community. As the number of subscribers grew, multiple exchanges served individual neighborhoods of large cities. Multiple exchanges were identified by a central office name and typically four digits, such as "Pennsylvania 5000". A rural telephone number, often party line, had often up to four digits and a letter or letter and digits to indicate which of the multiple parties on the line was desired.

Various methods were used to convert these to dialable numbers as dial systems replaced manual switchboards; many moderately-large cities used a 2L-4N format where "ADelaide 1234" would be dialled as AD-1234 (23-1234, a six-digit local call). The four largest cities (New York, Chicago, Philadelphia, and Boston) used seven digits. In New York, for example, "PENnsylvania 5000" became PEN-5000 and later PEnnsylvania 6-5000, dialled PE6-5000 or 736–5000). New York used the 3L-4N format from 1920, when dial telephones were first introduced there, until 1930, when it switched to 2L-5N.

The original North American area codes were assigned in 1947 as routing codes for operator calls, but by 1951, the first cross-country Bell System direct distance dial was placed directly from a subscriber station. The system was based on fixed-length numbers; a direct-dial long-distance call consisted of a three-digit area code and a seven-digit local number. Numbers in 2L-4N cities (such as Montréal and Toronto) were systematically lengthened to seven digits in the 1950s, a few exchanges at a time, so that all local numbers were seven digits when direct distance dialling finally came to town.

Exchange prefixes were added to small-town numbers to extend four or five-digit local numbers to the standardised seven-digit length, matching in length the then-longest local numbers in the largest major US markets.

== Structure ==
Within the multinational calling area administered by the North American Numbering Plan, telephone numbers are composed of three fixed-length fields: a three-digit numbering plan area (NPA) code (area code), a three-digit (NXX) central office code, and a four-digit (XXXX) station number.

In seven-digit dialing, only the central office code and the station number is dialed, indicating that the call destination is within the local area code. This was the standard in most of North America from the 1950s onward. In some small villages with only one local exchange, it may have been permissible to dial only the four-digit station number. Even after exchange names were introduced, it was possible in many small cities to call local numbers by dialing only the five digits which followed.

A long-distance call within the same area code could often be dialed as 1+7D, without using an area code. The scheme relied on the second digit of an area code being 0–1 and the second digit of a local exchange being 2–9. This dialing plan was incompatible with the introduction of area code 334 and area code 360, and was therefore eliminated by January 1, 1995, in the United States, and by September 1994 in Canada. It was also eliminated as early as 1981 in some numbering plan areas in the United States that had introduced interchangeable central office codes.

Interchangeable central office codes are central office codes (NXXs) which, with a zero or one as the middle digit, resemble and duplicate area codes in the pre-1995 format. They were introduced to postpone area code splits in major cities such as New York City and Los Angeles, but in 1988, AT&T/Bellcore made them mandatory for area codes nearing exhaust of non-interchangeable codes. The Massachusetts 617/508 split was the last one before the policy changed—617 did not yet have interchangeable NXXs at the time. Area codes with interchangeable NXXs had mandatory 10-digit long-distance dialing in order to allow exchanges to distinguish between intra- and inter-area code calls. From 1988 to 1994, few area codes splits were possible due to the dwindling supply of area codes, so conservation measures became necessary.

As of 1995, with the introduction of interchangeable NPA codes, nearly all code combinations are useful as NPAs or as NXXes.

== Office code protection ==
Traditionally, identical central office codes in adjacent Numbering Plan Areas (NPAs) would be assigned as far apart from each other as possible, so that callers living near an NPA boundary would not confuse numbers in the adjacent NPAs. Central office code protection made it possible in some low-density areas to use seven digits to reach areas in another area code.

Examples:

- Washington, D.C. (area code 202) to adjacent areas of Maryland (area code 301) and Virginia (area code 703), discontinued on October 1, 1990, to allow assignment of a code in all three area codes.
- Hull from Ottawa (before 2006, as every Ottawa-Hull local number originally was reserved in both area code 613 and 819). This was terminated on 21 October 2006 to allow assignment of a code in both 613 and 819, although five central office codes associated with the federal government were protected in 819 to allow dialing without potentially reaching non-government lines.

== Limitations ==
Area code overlay complexes introduced the requirement that calls must include the area code, resulting in a ten-digit dialing. Seven-digit dialing remains possible in some areas of North America with a single area code.

Traditionally, calling from one area code to another, specifically for long-distance calls, requires the caller to dial the trunk digit "1" before the code and number. More recently, with the increasing number and decreasing geographic size of area codes, it is increasingly possible to dial a number in another area code that is not long-distance where such a call does require the area code, but not the trunk digit (initial "1").

Many modern cellular phones automatically prepend the telephone's own area code if the user enters only seven digits, sending a total of ten digits. This is the same case with many landline providers that allow this. And also with many voice-over-IP services, users can configure default handling of seven-digit dialing in a dial plan.

== Timeline ==
=== Before 1947 ===
Local telephone numbers were governed by varying local numbering plans based on historical growth of services. Places without dial service often used special party line syntax (e.g., 2-R-48). The largest cities already used seven-digit telephone numbers and had dial service.

=== 1947 to 1951 ===
The American Telephone and Telegraph Company (AT&T) announced a nationwide numbering plan in 1947, which divided the United States and Canada into 86 numbering plan areas and assigned a unique area code to each. All area codes had a zero or one as the middle digit. A zero indicated that the state or province was served by a single area code, and a one indicated multiple divisions of a state or province.

Area codes were used as a universal destination routing code to the numbering plan area, and replaced the trunk routing codes that operators previously had to look up at the toll switching centers under the General Toll Switching Plan that was in use since 1929. In Operator Toll Dialing, automated equipment translated area codes to routing information. Systematic conversion of city dial systems commenced to the seven-digit (two-letter-five-number) numbering plan. Central office codes were restricted to the digits 2 to 9 in the middle position, to facilitate machine recognition when an area code was dialed. The same rule already applied to the first digit for technical and historical reasons.

=== 1951 to 1960 ===
Direct Distance Dialing (DDD) trials were conducted by the end of 1951, in which subscribers in Englewood, New Jersey, could dial long-distance calls to a select group of remote destinations, as far away as San Francisco, by using an area code.

DDD technology expanded to other major cities, By 1960, it was available in a few places in Canada, as well as most large American cities. This decade is notable for implementation of some thirty more area codes, including in Alaska, Hawaii, and the Caribbean.

=== 1960 to 1981 ===
Major progress may be noted in provisioning DDD service. Long-distance billing was computerized in the 1960s to the early 1980s. Few area codes were introduced during this time. Toll-free 800-service was introduced. Service demands in the largest American cities of New York and greater Los Angeles area resulted in the first use of interchangeable central office codes (NXX). All-number calling was implemented, replacing 2L-5N telephone numbers. A very small number of places still did not use a seven-digit numbering plan by 1981.

=== 1981 to 1994 ===
New area code assignments were increasing in the 1980s. From 1990 to 1994, all remaining assignable codes entered service. The exhaustion of NXX codes necessitated interchangeable codes in several more area codes. Ten-digit dialing, or 1+10D, was implemented in area codes with interchangeable NXX codes. Protected dialing plans as in national capital areas were discontinued to help meet demand without area code relief. As 1994 neared its end, ten-digit dialing became required throughout the numbering plan in preparation for interchangeable NPA codes.

All local numbers now had seven-digit, as the last technological hold-outs had given way to modern switching technology. The concept of a ten-digit local number was conceived, as New York had an overlay code (917, implemented in 1992), but seven-digit dialing was still the norm.

=== 1995 to 2019 ===
Interchangeable NPA codes were introduced in Washington state and Alabama, and some forty new area codes were introduced in 1999 as relief was implemented for pent-up demand. This included two additional toll-free prefixes as the 888 code was quickly exhausted. Since 1999, a more steady rate of area code introductions has taken place, the rate being slower due to one or more factors:

- economic recession
- consumer resistance
- conservation measures or regulatory measures
- pent-up demand being satisfied
- new market entrants leaving the business.

With overlays in several areas (the relief method of choice in Canada since 2000), ten-digit local numbers were supplanting seven-digit dialing; by 2024, only one Canadian area code (867) was still single-code areas (no overlay) and allowed seven-digit local dialling. (In the 867 area code, ten-digit dialling is required in the City of Yellowknife.) Although fewer American area codes were overlaid, seven-digit dialing was also disappearing in the United States.

=== 2020 to present ===
On July 16, 2020, the FCC adopted rules to establish 988 as the three-digit phone number for the National Suicide Prevention Lifeline. This required 82 area codes to switch to mandatory ten-digit dialing by October 24, 2021, because they had already used 988 as a central office code.

Similar transitions are scheduled in most parts of the remaining single-code areas in Canada by May 31, 2023, due in part to the rollout of 9-8-8 service in that country.

== See also ==
- Linked numbering scheme
- E.164
