= Canadian Numbering Administration Consortium =

Telephone number administrator in Canada

The Canadian Numbering Administration Consortium (CNAC) is the corporation responsible for administering Canada's telecommunication numbering resources. The CNA is regulated by the Canadian Radio-television and Telecommunications Commission (CRTC). The CNAC is headquartered in Ottawa, Ontario.

The CNAC selects and funds a neutral administrator known as the Canadian Numbering Administrator who performs the actual administrative duties. The CNAC is also responsible for paying the Canadian portion of the North American Numbering Plan Administration (NANPA) costs, which are funded by Canadian telecommunication service providers (TSP).

== See also ==
- List of NANP area codes
- Telephone numbers in Canada
- North American Numbering Plan expansion
