= List of Kentucky area codes =

The Commonwealth of Kentucky is divided into four geographically distinct numbering plan areas (NPAs) of the North American Numbering Plan (NANP), which are served by five area codes, with one NPA configured as an overlay complex of two area codes.

| Area code | Year created | Parent NPA | Overlay | Numbering plan area |
|---|---|---|---|---|
| 502 | 1947 | – | – | Louisville and Frankfort |
| 606 | 1954 | 502 | – | Eastern Kentucky, including the Eastern Coalfield |
| 859 | 1999 | 606 | – | Lexington area and Northern Kentucky |
| 270 | 1999 | 502 | 270/364 | Western Kentucky and the western half of South Central Kentucky |
| 364 | 2014 | 270 | 270/364 | Western Kentucky and the western half of South Central Kentucky |

== See also ==
- List of North American Numbering Plan area codes
- List of future North American area codes
