= Telephone numbers in Canada =

- Country: Canada
- Continent: North America
- NSN length: 10
- Format: NXX NXX-XXXX
- Country code: 1
- International access: 011
- Long-distance: 1

Telephone numbers in Canada are a component of the North American Numbering Plan (NANP). The fixed size of each telephone number consists of a three-digit area code, a three-digit central office code, also known as exchange code, and a four-digit station or line code. This is represented as NPA NXX XXXX.

== Syntax and telephone number notation ==
Canadian (and other North American Numbering Plan) telephone numbers are usually written as (NPA) NXX-XXXX. For example, 250 555 0199, a fictional number, could be written as (250) 555-0199, 250-555-0199, 250-5550199, or 250/555-0199. The Government of Canada's Translation Bureau recommends using hyphens between groups; e.g. 250-555-0199. Using the format specified by the International Telecommunication Union (ITU) in Recommendation E.164 for telephone numbers, a Canadian number is written as +1NPANXXXXXX, with no spaces, hyphens, or other characters; e.g. +12505550199.

== Prefix assignments ==
For international access, the NANP is assigned the telephone country code 1, which is dialed as a prefix in the international E.164 telephone numbering plan.

The trunk prefix for dialing long-distance calls, across numbering plan area (NPA) boundaries within Canada or to other NANP countries, is 1.

Local calls from Canadian landlines are dialled without the trunk prefix. Overseas calls to locations outside the NANP are dialled with the 011 international prefix, followed by the country code and the national significant number.

== Numbering plan areas ==
Canada was divided into nine numbering plan areas with unique area codes in 1947 when the American Telephone and Telegraph Company (AT&T) designed the first comprehensive telephone numbering plan for the North American continent for Operator Toll Dialing. This was an effort to speed up the connection time of long-distance telephone calls, by eliminating a large group of intermediate telephone operators, and implementing destination code routing. The effort eventually led to Direct Distance Dialing (DDD) by telephone subscribers, and the North American Numbering Plan.

Yukon, the far northern regions, and Newfoundland and Labrador (which was a British dominion at the time) were not included in the first assignments of 1947 for lack of telephone service. Locations with service bordering a numbering plan area, were later served with codes of the regional carriers, such as Northwestel, with toll-routing infrastructure.

| Numbering plan area | Area code(s) (1947) | Area code(s) by expansion and splits | Area code(s) by overlays |
|---|---|---|---|
| Alberta | 403 | 780 | 368, 587, 825 |
| British Columbia | 604 | 250 | 236, 672, 778, 257 |
| Manitoba | 204 | | 431, 584 |
| New Brunswick | (902)* | 506 | 428 |
| Newfoundland and Labrador | | (902)*, 709 | 879 |
| Nova Scotia and Prince Edward Island | 902 | | 782 |
| Ontario | 416, 613 | 519, 705, 807, 905 | 226, 249, 289, 343, 382, 365, 437, 548, 647, 683, 742, 753, 942 |
| Quebec | 418, 514 | 450, 819 | 263, 354, 367, 438, 468, 579, 581, 873 |
| Saskatchewan | 306 | | 474, 639 |
| Yukon, Northwest Territories, and Nunavut | | (403, 418, 819)**, 867 | |
Notes: * Area code was withdrawn from area ** served by codes of regional carriers

No numbering plan areas have been split in Canada since 1999.

Area codes 807 and 867 are the only remaining Canadian area codes that are not part of an overlay. Calls within each of these numbering plan areas may be initiated by seven-digit dialing.

== Central office codes ==
=== Mobile phones ===
Telephone numbers for mobile phones are not distinctly different from land-line numbers, and thus follow the same rules for format and area code. Local number portability permits telephone numbers to be ported between landline and mobile services. The rarely used non-geographic area code 600 is an exception to this pattern (non-portable, and allows caller-pays-airtime satellite telephony); some independent landline exchanges are also non-portable.

Mobile phone providers are general free to support any wireless standards with either CDMA or GSM; both are being supplanted by UMTS. Telus shut down its CDMA in mid-2015; Bell Mobility's CDMA network, the country's last major provider of that type, went dark on January 1, 2017.

== Toll-free and premium numbers ==
Non-geographic toll-free telephone numbers (800, 833, 844, 855, 866, 877, 888) and premium-rate telephone numbers (900) are allocated centrally by the NANP Administrator.

Calls to telephone numbers with the central office code 976 are billed as expensive premium calls.

== See also ==
- Canadian Numbering Administrator/Administrateur de la numérotation canadienne
- Canadian Numbering Administration Consortium (CNAC)
- Canadian Radio-television and Telecommunications Commission (CRTC)
- List of North American Numbering Plan area codes
- Telephone numbers in the Americas
