= Area code 456 =

North American telephone area code

Area code 456 is a telephone area code in the North American Numbering Plan that has been withdrawn from use and is available for a new assignment.

The area code was in use as non-geographic area code from 1993 until 2017 to route inbound calls from outside the territories of the North American Numbering Plan to specific carriers for carrier-specific services.

In November 2017, the area code 456 was withdrawn because of lack of demand. It was returned to the pool of unassigned codes in 2023 and is available for future assignment as a geographic NPA.

== See also ==
- List of North American Numbering Plan area codes
