= Area code 700 =

Special area code

Area code 700 of the North American Numbering Plan is a service access code (SAC) implemented by interexchange carriers. It is reserved for carrier-specific number assignments to special services or destinations. It was introduced in 1983 for providing customized services in anticipation of the introduction of long-distance competition in the United States, but this usage has been deprecated. The area code has found renewed usage for custom calling services by voice over IP service providers and in software-defined voice networks.

== History ==
Area code 700 was introduced into the North American Numbering Plan (NANP) in 1983, after the breakup of the Bell System monopoly, as a method of telephone number assignment by interexchange carriers to implement new services rapidly. The area code does not designate a geographical numbering plan area (NPA), but destinations for this NPA code are exclusive to each interexchange carrier. A local exchange carrier routes calls to 700-numbers to the interexchange carrier that the subscriber has chosen, unless the caller overrides presubscription by prefixing the destination telephone number with a carrier access code (101XXXX).

The number (700) 555-4141 was established to allow subscribers to identify their long-distance service providers (interexchange carriers) after the breakup. Consumers were later advised to use the number to check whether they had become victims of slamming. The number is also used for this purpose in Canada.

In 1992, AT&T introduced a 700-number service branded as AT&T EasyReach 700. It provided a service for subscribers to forward calls placed to a personal 700-number to any domestic telephone number. Either the caller or the subscriber could be set up to pay for the incoming calls. If the call originated from a telephone not pre-subscribed to AT&T as its interexchange carrier, the caller was required to dial 10-288 (10-ATT) prior to dialing the 700-number.

Almost all of the early 700 offerings have ceased, because of a combination of confusion, blocking of calls to them by many businesses, and many alternative services.

== Modern usage ==
Some carriers have used area code 700 to offer carrier network services. For example, Vonage has provided weather information with 700-WEATHER (700-932-8437).

Within North America, area code 700 has become the de facto area code in software-defined voice networks. It provides a common area code when integrating voice-over-IP (VoIP) networks. In many cases, the area code is used when large organizations interconnect multiple sites or agencies, organizations, or jurisdictions under a common numbering plan. For example, Walmart uses area code 700 to provide a "store support hotline" (700-Walmart, 700-925-6278) on its internal store phone network.

AT&T and other providers offer managed VoIP services that route all customer calls (internal and external) over the carrier network. Many VoIP SDN services use area code 700 to denote VoIP calls requiring software-defined network routing.

== See also ==
- List of North American Numbering Plan area codes
- Area code 500
