= Personal communications service (NANP) =

Telecommunication service in North America

In telecommunication, a personal communications service is defined by the Alliance for Telecommunications Industry Solutions (ATIS) as "a set of capabilities that allows some combination of personal mobility, terminal mobility, and service profile management".

Personal communications services use a special non-geographic area code of the format 5XX for assigning telephone numbers for service instances.

The designation of the 5XX area code format was authorized by the United States Federal Communications Commission, and introduced into the North American Numbering Plan in 1995.

== United States ==
In 1993, the North American Numbering Plan designated area code 500 for personal communication services. An initial service concept was that customers could move a given seven-digit telephone number when relocating between numbering plan areas. The 500-code would thus be a non-geographic area code.

In 1995, AT&T introduced a "follow-me" service under the brand name of AT&T True Connections using area code 500. It was designed to replace the AT&T EasyReach 700 service. Other local exchange carriers and interexchange carriers introduced similar competitive services. With the rise of mobile devices such as mobile phones and pagers, making the service all but superfluous, AT&T True Connections and their competitors failed quickly.

Companies, hotels, and others with PBX equipment continued to block the dialing of 500 because it was a caller-paid number. It was also misused by premium rate services such as phone sex lines, with it being used to forward calls to various foreign countries. The prefix was also used by some Internet service providers to allow non-subscribers to dial into their systems for dial-up Internet access.

In 1996, AT&T attempted to migrate users to its revised service called "Personal Reach" 800, built on a toll-free (receiver-paid) platform rather than the original (caller-paid) 500 program. AT&T has a US patent (5,907,811) on "personal reach service".

AT&T then licensed and transferred all personal reach services to MCE, Inc. MCE was supposedly the company providing the back-end system for all personal reach services to AT&T. No public information was released on the transfer away from AT&T. Subscribers were notified by mail that bills would begin to arrive from MCE instead of AT&T. It is also believed that MCE is a subsidiary of EMNS, Inc., a web hosting company in Chicago. MCE continues to supply personal reach service using the AT&T transport network.

AT&T discontinued AT&T True Connections in 2000, following the Federal Communications Commission approval of its tariff to cease providing the service.

The numbering resources are now designated 5XX-NXX in NANP and are used for machine to machine communication.

Although AT&T no longer uses the 500 code, it was supplemented by additional codes from 2009 onward.

Activation of 5XX codes for PCS
Code	Activation	Days since last activation
533	2009-09-26	
544	2010-12-15	445
566	2012-04-17	489
577	2014-03-28	710
588	2015-09-09	530
522	2016-08-01	327
521	2017-09-12	407
523	2018-11-12	426
524	2019-07-12	242
525	2020-07-13	367
526	2021-01-28	199
527	2021-09-29	244
528	2022-03-02	154
529	2022-09-16	198
532	2024-11-04	780

Other codes in reserve for this use: 535, 538, 542, 543, 545, 546, 547, 549, 550, 552, 553, 554, 556, 558, 569, 578, and 589.

On February 11, 2022, 103 of the 5XX-NXX codes were reported as available for assignment and the code 528 was designated as the next NPA code to be assigned. On March 2, 2022, the NANPA announced the initiation of NPA 528.

On August 29, 2022, 193 of the 5XX-NXX codes were reported as available for assignment and the code 529 was designated as the next NPA code to be assigned. On September 16, 2022, the NANPA announced the initiation of NPA 529.

2024: NPA 532 activated

2025: The NANPA informs the industry of pending activation of area code 538 as the next available area code for non-geographic services.

== Canada ==
In 2015, the Canadian Radio-television and Telecommunications Commission (CRTC) approved the Canadian Non-Geographic Code Assignment Guideline and the assignment of the 622, 633, 644, 655, 677, and 688 non-geographic numbering plan area (NPA) codes to meet the demand for telephone numbers related to technologies such as machine-to-machine applications. The first 6YY NPA to be used is 622 NPA, with additional numbers requested when 622 approaches exhaustion.

== See also ==
- List of North American Numbering Plan area codes
- Toll-free telephone numbers in the North American Numbering Plan
- Area code 700
- Area code 900
