= Area code 600 =

Canadian non-geographic area code

Area code 600 is a telephone area code in the North American Numbering Plan for non-geographic use in Canada of specialized telecommunication services such as telex applications, caller-pays cellular, ISDN, and mobile satellite communication services.

One of the area code's most common uses is the provision of satellite phone service in remote areas of Northern Canada where conventional telecommunications infrastructure is not available.

Central office prefixes for area code 600 are assigned according to a special set of guidelines issued by the Canadian Radio-television and Telecommunications Commission. The guidelines do not define the services that qualify for the non-geographic numbers, but specify that:

In the context of NPA 600, Non-Geographic Services are specific telecommunications services that are: 1) approved by the CRTC, or confirmed by the CRTC as not requiring approval, 2) provided by Canadian Telecommunications Service Providers (TSPs), 3) made available on a non-geographic basis to customers located in Canada, and 4) accessible from at least one public Canadian telecommunications network other than the Code Holder's network.

The teletypewriter services provided with the area code were previously provisioned with area code 610 in the Teletypewriter Exchange Service (TWX) in 1962. The services were reassigned to area code 600 in 1993, returning 610 to the pool of unassigned area codes for general purposes. It was reassigned in 1994 to Pennsylvania.

Area code 600 has a capacity of 798 central office prefixes (200 to 999, with 555 and 911 not issued). Six relief area codes (622, 633, 644, 655, 677 and 688) are reserved by NANPA as subject to assignment in Canada for expansion of non-geographic services but have never been used. Area code 666 is not assigned. Each block of 10,000 numbers is assigned to one carrier only; number portability or number pooling is not practiced. A carrier offering multiple, different non-geographic services may request separate prefixes for each.

== See also ==
- List of North American Numbering Plan area codes
- Telephone numbers in Canada
