= Area code 710 =

Special area code reserved for the United States government

Area code 710 is a special area code in the North American Numbering Plan (NANP). It was reserved for the federal government of the United States in 1983 for emergency services. Since 1994, the area code has provided access for authorized personnel to the Government Emergency Telecommunications Service (GETS) in the United States, and the Canadian local exchange carriers, and cellular/PCS networks. Previously, it was a Service Access Code (SAC) in the Teletypewriter Exchange Service (TWX) for the northeastern part of the United States.

== History ==
Dialing prefixes of the form N10, where N is any digit from 2 to 9, were not initially assigned in the nationwide numbering plan which was designed in the post-World War II era, and announced in October 1947. By the 1960s, these area codes were designated and reserved from general assignment as Service Access Codes (SAC).

=== Teletypewriter Exchange Service ===
In 1962, AT&T assigned the first N10 code in area code 510, for conversion to dial service of the Teletypewriter Exchange Service (TWX) in the United States. Later in the decade, the TWX dial system was extended with the new prefixes 710, 810, and 910. 710 was assigned to a region comprising the northeast of the United States (New England, New York, New Jersey, Pennsylvania, Maryland, the District of Columbia, Virginia, and West Virginia). Telex use of prefix 710 was decommissioned in 1981, and became available for assignment as a normal area code.

=== United States government ===
The area code is reserved for use by the United States Government. It is used in the Government Emergency Telecommunications Service (GETS), is intended for emergencies or crisis situations when the landline network is congested and the probability of completing a normal call is reduced. It provides alternate carrier routing, high probability of completion, trunk queuing and exemptions from network management controls.

A special access code of 12 digits is required for using the service. Upon dialing this telephone number, a beep prompts the caller to enter the access code. Thus authorized, the caller is prompted to dial the destination number (area code and number). If an access code is not entered, the call is redirected to a human operator who asks for the access code.

As of December 1, 2006, the area code had only one known working telephone number, 710-627-4387 (710-NCS-GETS) for the Government Emergency Telecommunications Service (GETS) in the National Communications System (NCS).

== See also ==
- List of North American Numbering Plan area codes
