= List of future North American area codes =

This is a list of future area codes in the North American Numbering Plan (NANP) that are either reserved or in a planning stage for relief of central office code exhaustion in their parent numbering plan area (NPA). The dates are subject to change during implementation as published in the official NANP Administrator Planning Letters.

New area code	Affected NPA	Jurisdiction	Projected exhaust date	Relief date
273	367/418/581	Quebec	2029 – 1st Qtr	February 27, 2027
565	912	Georgia	2028 – 1st Qtr	TBA
761	502	Kentucky	2028 – 2nd Qtr	TBA
851	782/902	Nova Scotia	2028 – 2nd Qtr	May 27, 2028

== See also ==
- List of North American Numbering Plan area codes
