= Telephone numbers in the Americas =

The prefixes in the Americas start with one of 1,2,5

All countries in the Americas use telephone country codes that start with 5, with the exception of the countries of the North American Numbering Plan, such as Canada and the United States, which use country code 1, and Greenland and Aruba with country codes starting with the digit 2, which otherwise is mostly used by countries in Africa.

	Location in the Americas	Prefix	International call prefix	Trunk prefix	Comment
Anguilla	Caribbean	1-264	011	1	
Antigua and Barbuda	Caribbean	1-268	011	1	
Argentina	South	54	00	0	
Aruba	Caribbean	297	00		
Bahamas	Caribbean	1-242	011	1	
Barbados	Caribbean	1-246	011	1	
Belize	Central	501			
Bermuda	North	1-441	011	1	
Bolivia	South	591	00	0	
Brazil	South	55	00 xx	0	
British Virgin Islands	Caribbean	1-284	011	1	
Canada	North	1	011	1	Several NANP codes; see Telephone numbers in Canada.
Caribbean Netherlands	Caribbean	599-3, 4, or 7	00		
Cayman Islands	Caribbean	1-345	011	1	
Chile	South	56	1xx0		
Colombia	South	57	00	0	Trunk followed by 1- or 3-digit carrier code
Costa Rica	Central	506	00		
Cuba	Caribbean	53	00	0	
Curaçao	Caribbean	599-9	00		
Dominica	Caribbean	1-767	011	1	
Dominican Republic	Caribbean	1-809, 829, 849	011	1	
Ecuador	South	593	00	0	
El Salvador	Central	503			
Falkland Islands	South	500	00		
French Guiana	South	594	00	0	
Greenland	North	299	00		
Grenada	Caribbean	1-473	011	1	
Guadeloupe	Caribbean	590	00	0	
Guatemala	Central	502	00		
Guyana	South	592	00		
Haiti	Caribbean	509	00		
Honduras	Central	504	00		
Jamaica	Caribbean	1-658, 876	011	1	
Martinique	Caribbean	596	00	0	
Mexico	North	52	00		
Montserrat	Caribbean	1-664	011	1	
Nicaragua	Central	505	00		
Panama	Central	507	00		
Paraguay	South	595	00	0	
Peru	South	51	00	0	
Puerto Rico	Caribbean	1-787, 939	011	1	
Saint Barthélemy	Caribbean	590	00		
Saint Kitts and Nevis	Caribbean	1-869	011	1	
Saint Lucia	Caribbean	1-758	011	1	
Collectivity of Saint Martin	Caribbean	590	00		
Saint Pierre and Miquelon	North	508	00	0	
Saint Vincent and the Grenadines	Caribbean	1-784	011	1	
Sint Maarten	Caribbean	1-721	011	1	
South Georgia and the South Sandwich Islands	South	500	00		
Suriname	South	597	00		
Trinidad and Tobago	Caribbean	1-868	011	1	
Turks and Caicos Islands	Caribbean	1-649	011	1	
United States	North	1	011	1	Many NANP numbering plan areas
United States Virgin Islands	Caribbean	1-340	011	1	
Uruguay	South	598	00		No national call prefix needed since 29 August 2010 according to the new numbering plan. All geographical numbers have eight digits.
Venezuela	South	58	00	0	

== See also ==
- Telephone numbering plan
- National conventions for writing telephone numbers
- List of telephone country codes
- List of international call prefixes
- List of North American Numbering Plan area codes
- Area codes in the Caribbean
- Category:Telephone numbers by country
