= 809 scam =

Form of phone fraud targeting the US and Canada

An 809 scam is a form of phone fraud which exploits the tendency of telephone subscribers in Canada and the United States to presume that a number in the familiar North American Numbering Plan format of 1-NPA-NXX-XXXX is a domestic call at standard rates because of the absence of the 011- international prefix which normally indicates an overseas call.

The former 1-809 area was split into multiple codes (in black) in 1997. While country codes of areas outside of the NANP (in red) must be prefixed with 011-, the others "look" domestic from Canada/USA but incur international rates.

Points in the former +1-809 area code are not in mainland North America but in the Caribbean, distributed among multiple small island nations. Some former 1-809 points are US possessions (such as Puerto Rico and USVI), but many are sovereign entities. Adding to the confusion, the 809 code was split into multiple new area codes in 1997. A call to these points may be just as expensive as any other overseas call.

Most numbers in these area codes are legitimate; calls to regular landlines in many of the countries may normally be moderately priced. There is, however, a risk that premium numbers in these area codes will not be properly identified as such; the use of a foreign country allows circumvention of the meagre consumer protections which the US Federal Communications Commission or the Canadian Radio-television and Telecommunications Commission (CRTC) apply to domestic 1-900 or 976-XXXX schemes.

Consumers usually receive a message telling them to call a phone number with an 809, 284, 649, or 876 area code in order to collect a prize, find out information about a sick relative, etc. The caller assumes the number is a typical three-digit U.S. area code; however, the caller is actually connected to a phone number outside the United States, often in Canada or the Caribbean, and charged international call rates.

— AT&T

Often, the claims of high costs are exaggerated to the point of urban legend after repeated re-telling in e-mail. "I called this number not knowing it was $2425/minute and I received a bill for $24100" is likely a corruption of an original message that a $25/minute call rang up a $100 bill in four minutes; a huge distortion of what may have originally been a valid (but sensationalised) warning.

As these are international calls, they are not covered by domestic flat-rate calling plans. These codes may contain caller-pays mobile numbers or individual countries which impose inflated taxes or monopoly pricing on inbound international calls.

== Modus operandi ==
Abuse of 1-809 to disguise premium numbers or numbers which paid a kickback to operators of the schemes has been reported at least as early as 1996.

In some cases, the numbers are promoted as phone sex or other typical premium-price fare; the full cost of the call is often hidden by claiming the numbers to be free with the disclaimer that "international long distance charges may apply".

The numbers may appear in unsolicited commercial e-mail. They may be left as messages on voicemail systems or pocket pagers. They may be accompanied by fraudulent messages that a relative abroad is in trouble and needs assistance, or may be attached to an abusive message from a bogus collection agency. The motive is to trick the victim into calling the international number, and keep them on the line to run up long-distance charges.

A more recent variant uses caller ID spoofing to make the victim's handset ring once - just long enough to display the number. If the curious (or annoyed) victim calls back, the number is on their bill; a variant of the Wangiri "one ring" scams originally observed in Japan.
