= Area code 340 =

Telephone area code of the U.S. Virgin Islands

Coordinates: 18°21′N 64°56′W

Area code 340 is the telephone area code in the North American Numbering Plan (NANP) for the U.S. Virgin Islands. Area code 340 was created by split from the Caribbean numbering plan area with area code 809 in 1998.

A permissive dialing period was conducted from 1 June 1997 to 30 June 1998.

Calls within the U.S. Virgin Islands are dialed with the seven digits of the telephone number. Calls from other NANP countries or territories to the U.S. Virgin Islands, require ten-digit dialing after dialing the trunk code 1.

== See also ==
- List of North American Numbering Plan area codes
- Area codes in the Caribbean

U.S. Virgin Islands area codes: 340
	North: 441	
West: 787/939	Area code 340	East: 284
	South: Caribbean Sea	
Bermuda area codes: 441
British Virgin Islands area codes: 284
Puerto Rico area codes: 787/939
