= Area codes in the Caribbean =

Several countries in the Caribbean participate in the North American Numbering Plan (NANP), which is a telephone numbering plan designed after World War II by the American Telephone and Telegraph Company for initially the United States and Canada.

In 1958, AT&T delegated area code 809 for Direct Distance Dialing to the Caribbean to facilitate integration of the Caribbean telephone networks into the continental long-distance service.

From 1958 to 1999, most of the British West Indies in the Caribbean Basin, Bermuda, the U.S. Virgin Islands, the Dominican Republic and Puerto Rico shared area code 809. By the mid-1990s, with the proliferation of fax machines, mobile phones, computers, and pagers in the region, the pool of available central office codes was exhausting. Beginning with Bermuda in November 1994, and The Bahamas, Puerto Rico, and Barbados in 1995, several countries in the Caribbean received individual area code assignments from the NANPA, effectively splitting area code 809. By 1999, it was retained only by the Dominican Republic, following the departure of Saint Vincent and the Grenadines from using the area code.

== Assignments ==
Numbering plan area	Area code	Year of assignment
Anguilla	264	1996
Antigua and Barbuda	268	1996
The Bahamas	242	1995
Barbados	246	1995
Bermuda	441	1994
British Virgin Islands	284	1996
Cayman Islands	345	1996
Dominica	767	1996
Dominican Republic	809, 829, 849	1958, 2005, 2009
Grenada	473	1996
Jamaica	876, 658	1996, 2018
Montserrat	664	1996
Puerto Rico	787, 939	1995, 2000
Saint Kitts and Nevis	869	1996
Saint Lucia	758	1996
Saint Vincent and the Grenadines	784	1997
Sint Maarten	721	2009
Trinidad and Tobago	868	1996
Turks and Caicos Islands	649	1997
U.S. Virgin Islands	340	1997

Sint Maarten was part of the Netherlands Antilles until its dissolution in 2010. It is a constituent country within the Kingdom of the Netherlands. Sint Maarten used the country code 599 of the Netherlands Antilles until joining the NANP on September 30, 2011, with area code 721.

== Former assignments within 809 ==
The following was the 1958-1995 numbering plan for 809. Starting in the 1980s, Puerto Rico, Bermuda and the Dominican Republic began to use prefixes from unused ranges throughout the 2xx to 9xx range. Historic (1960s-mid-1980s) ranges are shown in parentheses.

The number pool of the area code was divided between the regions by the national number, which was from two to four digits long, leaving five to three digits, respectively, of the total of ten digits of a complete telephone number for local telephone number assignments. The national number appeared in local telephone directories.

Caribbean nations with a larger numbering resource requirement used seven-digit dialing, and had no need for a national number.

Non-NANP jurisdictions (i.e., the rest of the world) identified a Caribbean calling destination by analyzing the first six digits dialed (1809xx), therefore, faced the difficulty where a seventh digit was required to identify the specific nation. Rates based on destination would have to be the same for all destinations sharing the same six digits, e.g., St. Lucia and St. Vincent would have to be the same rate; Anguilla, British Virgin Islands and Montserrat would need to be the same rate; Antigua, Barbuda, Nevis and St. Kitts also would have to be the same rate. Since Cable and Wireless was the provider in most or all cases, the same corporate entity benefited from the revenue for incoming calls. The assignment of new area codes after 1994 resolved this since only the first four digits would be required to distinguish each country.

territory	number form	notes
Anguilla	809-497-xxxx	(National number 4972, then expanded to four digit local numbers as N.N. 497)
Antigua and Barbuda	809-46x-xxxx	(National number 46)
The Bahamas	809-32x-xxxx through 809-37x-xxxx	
Barbados	809-42x-xxxx 809-43x-xxxx	(National number 43, then changed to 7D, as 42 or 43)
Bermuda	809-xxx-xxxx	(National number 29, then changed to 7D, as 23 or 29)
British Virgin Islands	809-49x-xxxx	(National number 49)
Carriacou	809-44x-xxxx	
The Cayman Islands	809-94x-xxxx	(National number 94)
The Commonwealth of Dominica	809-44x-xxxx	(National number 44 shared with Grenada)
The Dominican Republic	809-5xx-xxxx 809-68x-xxxx	
Grenada	809-44x-xxxx	(National number 44 shared with Dominica)
Jamaica	809-9xx-xxxx	(began with 9, other than 94x)
Montserrat	809-491-xxxx	(National number 491)
Puerto Rico	809-7xx-xxxx 809-8xx-xxxx 809-25x-xxxx 809-26x-xxxx 809-27x-xxxx 809-28x-xxxx	
Saint Kitts and Nevis	809-465-xxxx	(National numbers 465 for St. Kitts, 469 for Nevis)
Saint Lucia	809-45x-xxxx	(National number 45 shared with St Vincent)
Saint Vincent	809-45x-xxxx	(National number 45 shared with St. Lucia)
Trinidad and Tobago	809-6xx-xxxx	(began with 6, other than 68)
Turks and Caicos Islands	809-946-xxxx	(National number 946)
The U.S. Virgin Islands	809-77x-xxxx	

An incumbent service provider listed the numbering system as follows:

Numbering format	Country
29x-xxxx	Bermuda
3xx-xxxx	The Bahamas
4xx-xxxx	Barbados
44x-xxxx	The Commonwealth of Dominica
44x-xxxx	Grenada
45x-xxxx	Saint Lucia
45x-xxxx	Saint Vincent
46x-xxxx	Antigua and Barbuda
465-xxxx	Saint Kitts
469-xxxx	Nevis
491-xxxx	Montserrat
497-xxxx	Anguilla (started as 4972 + three)
49x-xxxx	British Virgin Islands
5xx-xxxx	The Dominican Republic
68x-xxxx	The Dominican Republic
6xx-xxxx	Trinidad and Tobago
77x-xxxx	The U.S. Virgin Islands
7xx-xxxx	Puerto Rico
8xx-xxxx	Puerto Rico
946-xxxx	The Turks and Caicos Islands
94x-xxxx	The Cayman Islands
9xx-xxxx	Jamaica

== Other territories ==
Not all of the Caribbean islands are members of the North American Numbering Plan. The following countries have country codes assigned by the International Telecommunication Union (ITU).

territory	country code
Aruba	297
Haiti	509
Cuba	53
Guadeloupe	590
Saint Barthélemy	590
Saint Martin	590
Martinique	596
Caribbean Netherlands	599
Curaçao	599

== See also ==
- 809 scam
- List of North American Numbering Plan area codes
- Telephone numbers in the Americas
- List of telephone country codes
- Category:Telephone numbers by country
