= Area code 900 =

Premium rate telephone prefix in North America

Area code 900 is a telephone area code in the North American Numbering Plan for premium-rate telephone numbers. Area code 900 was installed in 1971.

Premium rate services are dialed in the format 1-900-XXX-XXXX. This is often called a 900 number or a 1 900 number ("one-nine-hundred").

A call to a 900-number can result in high per-minute or per-call charges. For example, a "psychic hotline" may charge US$2.99 for the first minute and US$0.99 for each additional minute.

== History ==
The first 900-service known to have been used in the United States, was for the "Ask President Carter" program in March 1977, for incoming calls to a nationwide talk radio broadcast featuring the newly elected President Jimmy Carter, hosted by anchorman Walter Cronkite. At that time, the intent for area code 900 was as a choke exchange—a code that blocked large numbers of simultaneous callers from jamming up the long-distance network. Numbers with the 900 area code were those which were expected to have a huge number of potential callers, and the 900 area code was screened at the local level to allow only a certain number of the callers in each area to access the nationwide long-distance network for reaching the destination number. Also, the early incarnation of 900 was not billed at premium-rate charges, but rather at regular long-distance charges based on the time of day and day of week that the call was placed. The number used for the radio program was one that was specially arranged by AT&T Corporation, CBS Radio, and the White House, to be free to the calling party. However, by 1980, the 900 area code was completely restructured by AT&T to be the premium-rate special area code which it remains today. At that time, many evening news agencies conducted "pulse polls" for $0.50 per call charges and displayed results on television. One early use was by Saturday Night Live producers for the sketch "Larry the Lobster", featuring Eddie Murphy. The comedy sketch drew nearly 500,000 calls. AT&T and the producers of SNL split the profits of nearly $250,000.

Earlier, 976 numbers used 976 as a local prefix (970 or 540 in some markets, such as New York state), though it was not assigned to a specific telephone exchange. These numbers were dialed as any other number, such as 976–1234.

Initially, consumers had no choice regarding the accessibility to 900 or 976 numbers with their subscription service. However, in 1987, after a child had accumulated a bill of $17,000, the California Public Utilities Commission subsequently required telephone companies to give customers the option of preventing the dialing of premium-rate numbers.

From the early 1980s through the early 1990s, it was common to see commercials promoting 1 (900) numbers to children featuring such things as characters famous from Saturday morning cartoons to Santa Claus. Due to complaints from parent groups about kids not knowing the dangers and high cost of such calls, the FTC enacted new rules and such commercials directed at children ceased to air on television as of the mid-1990s.

Using 900-numbers for adult entertainment lines was a prevalent practice in the early years of the industry. This practice continues, along with the use of these numbers for things such as software technical support, banking access, and stock tips. Adult entertainment 900 numbers have been largely absent from AT&T and MCI since 1991. In 1992, the Supreme Court allowed a law passed by Congress that created a block on all 900 numbers that provided adult content, except for those consumers who requested access to a specific number in writing. The law killed the adult 900 number business, which moved over to 800 numbers, where billing had to be done by credit card.

Hulk Hogan's Hotline was a lucrative 900 number in the 1990s. Other early leaders in amassing huge volumes of revenue were the New Kids on the Block and Dionne Warwick's Psychic Friends Network.

== Regulations ==
Consumers in the US have specific rights regarding 900 number calls, as laid down by the Federal Trade Commission, such as the right to a disclaimer at the beginning of the call and a subsequent 3-second hang-up grace period, the ability to contest billing errors, a prohibition on marketing to children, and a requirement that telecommunication companies must allow the consumer to block dialing to 900 numbers. US telephone companies are prohibited from disconnecting local service as a means to force payment for 1 (900) calls. Furthermore, in 2002, AT&T withdrew from billing their customers for the fee structures. This was followed by other companies throughout the decade until 2012, when Verizon, the final hold-out, also withdrew from passing on the charges.

Various attempts have been made by vendors to circumvent these protections by using Caribbean or other international numbers outside Federal Communications Commission jurisdiction to bill US telephone subscribers; the former +1 (809) countries were popular as their North American Numbering Plan format numbers look domestic but are not. The 101XXXX dial-around prefixes were also briefly the target of abuse by premium number providers posing as inter-exchange carriers, a practice which has now been stopped. A loophole which allowed US (but not Canadian) providers in toll-free area code 800 to bill for calls by claiming the subscriber agreed to the charges has also been largely closed by more stringent regulation.

== See also ==
- Telecommunications tariffs
- Premium SMS
