= Area codes 876 and 658 =

Telephone numbers in Jamaica

Coordinates: 18.1691°N 77.3698°W

NANP numbering plan area 876/658

Area codes 876 and 658 are telephone area codes in the North American Numbering Plan (NANP) for Jamaica.

Having telephone service to the United States as early as 1936, it was not until 1962 that Jamaica had a high-capacity link for dial service to the US network, which was operated as part of the NANP numbering plan area 809. 809 was designated for parts of the Caribbean region in 1958, and was divided in the 1990s for service to individual countries. Area code 876 was created on 1 May 1997 for Jamaica. In 2019, the numbering plan area received a second area code, 658, in formation of an overlay to relieve central office code exhaustion.

The telephone country code for reaching telephone numbers in the country is 1. From other NANP member regions, the dialing pattern is 1-876/658 NXX-XXXX, where 1 is the NANP long-distance trunk prefix.

== History ==
In 1936, AT&T installed the first telephone service extensions to Puerto Rico, Jamaica, and El Salvador in the Caribbean.

In 1958, Bermuda and the Caribbean Islands were designated as a large numbering plan area (NPA) with area code 809 as part of a comprehensive North American telephone numbering plan first defined in 1947 by the American Telephone and Telegraph Company in cooperation with the independent telephone operators in the United States and Canada.

It was not until 1962 that a high-capacity undersea telephone cable was installed between Jamaica and the United States for dial service. For over three decades, Jamaica participated in the North American numbering system with a set of three-digit central office codes that had the digit 9 in the leading position, that were routed with area code 809.

In 1996, the Jamaican government requested and were granted by Bellcore, the NANP administration, the assignment of a new and separate area code for the country. Area code 876 was created on 1 May 1997, by a split of NPA 809. In the process area code 809 was removed from the country and existing central office codes were reassigned with the new area code. A permissive dialing period during which central office codes could be reached with either area code began on 1 May 1997 and ended 31 July 1998, after being extended from 1 November 1997.

On 15 September 2016, the Office of Utilities Regulation approved an area code overlay in relief of central office code exhaustion in the country. Area code 658 was scheduled for service on 30 November 2018. This was subsequently postponed until 30 April 2019. Ten-digit dialing was permissive from 31 May, becoming mandatory on 30 March 2019, The first numbers in area code 658 were not assigned until May 2023.

The country has been served by two mobile operators – Cable & Wireless/Liberty Global (marketed as FLOW Jamaica) and Digicel. The country's main landline provider is FLOW, as well as other smaller landline players like Digicel.

== Fraud ==
The 876 area code was linked to a form of telephone fraud known as the "one ring scam". The person perpetuating the scam called the victim via a robodialer or similar means, sometimes at odd hours of the night, then hung up when the phone was answered with the hope that they would be curious enough to call the number back. When the victim did this, substantial international call charges could accrue. Similar scams have been linked to Grenada (area code 473), Antigua (268), the Dominican Republic (809, 829, and 849), and the British Virgin Islands (284).

The telephone fraud in Jamaica is a primary topic of the episode "Jamaican Lottery Scam" of the television series American Greed.

== See also ==
- List of North American Numbering Plan area codes
- Area codes in the Caribbean

Jamaica area codes: 876/658
	North: Country code +53 in Cuba	
West: 345	Area code 876, 658	East: Country code +509 in Haiti
	South: Caribbean Sea	
Cayman Islands area codes: 345
