= Area code 473 =

Area code for Grenada, Carriacou and Petite Martinique

Coordinates: 12°07′N 61°40′W

Area code 473 is the telephone area code in the North American Numbering Plan for Grenada, Carriacou, and Petite Martinique. The area code was created by a split of the original Caribbean numbering plan area, with area code 809 on October 31, 1997.

473 spells GRE, the first three letters of Grenada, on the alphanumeric telephone keypad.

For calls placed within Grenada, Carriacou or Petite Martinique, only the seven-digit local number is dialed. Calls to Grenada from anywhere in the North American Numbering Plan are dialed 1 + 473 + seven-digit phone number.

== Telephone fraud ==
The 473 area code has been linked to a form of telephone fraud known as the "one ring scam". The person perpetrating the scam calls the victim via a robodialer or similar means, sometimes at odd hours of the night, then hangs up when the phone is answered with the hope that the victim will be curious enough to call the number back. When the victim does this, an automatic $19.95 international call fee is charged to their account, as well as $9.00/min thereafter. Similar scams have been linked to Antigua (area code 268), Jamaica (area codes 876 and 658), the Dominican Republic (area code 809) and the British Virgin Islands (area code 284).

== See also ==
- List of NANP area codes
- Area codes in the Caribbean

Grenada area codes: 473
	North: 784	
West: Caribbean Sea	473	East: Atlantic Ocean
	South: 868, country code +58 in Venezuela	
Saint Vincent and the Grenadines area codes: 784
Trinidad and Tobago area codes: 868
