= Area code 246 =

Barbados telephone area code

Coordinates: 13°10′12″N 59°33′09″W

Area code 246 is the telephone area code in the North American Numbering Plan (NANP) for Barbados. The sequence 246 spells BIM on an alpha-numeric telephone keypad, a nickname for the island.

Telecommunication services and telephone numbers in Barbados are administered by the Ministry of Finance, Investment, Telecommunications and Energy (MFIE) of the Government of Barbados.

As a member of the North American Numbering Plan, Barbados uses telephone country code 1 for inbound routing of international calls. The telephone number format consists of the three-digit area code, the three-digit central office prefix and the local four-digit line or station number. Dialing procedures within the country and abroad conform to NANP standards. Thus, Barbados telephone numbers are quoted per International Telecommunication Union (ITU) Recommendation E.123 in the style +1 246 NXX-XXXX for international use.

== History ==
In 1958, the American Telephone and Telegraph Company (AT&T) assigned area code 809 for use by all affiliated telephone administrations in Bermuda and the Caribbean islands. Between 1995 and 1999, the numbering plan area was divided, and new area codes were assigned to individual administrations. Area code 246 was assigned to Barbados in 1995. The area code was in effect from 1 July 1996, and a permissive dialing period extended to 15 January 1997, at which time all calls placed to Barbados required the new area code.

== Dialing procedures ==
=== To Barbados ===
- From within North America (NANP)

When calling Barbados from elsewhere in the North American Numbering Plan (e.g. from the United States or Canada), callers use ten-digit dialing after the long-distance trunk prefix 1. Thus callers dial 1 246 and the seven digit local telephone number.

- From outside the NANP

When calling to Barbados from outside the NANP (e.g. from the United Kingdom), callers must dial the international dialling prefix followed by 1 to access the North American Numbering Plan. For example, a call placed from the United Kingdom is dialled as 00 1 246 NXX XXXX, where NXX XXXX is the local telephone number.

=== Within Barbados ===
When placing a call within Barbados, callers use seven-digit dialling (i.e. dialling the last seven digits of the national telephone number). Unlike in some other Caribbean islands, most residential landline subscribers have unlimited/un-metered rates for calling other local landlines.

- To North America (NANP)

When calling to other places in the North American Numbering Plan, calls are dialed by ten-digit dialing in those countries. Callers dial 1 NPA NXX XXXX.

Though usually toll-free when dialled from the US, not all 1-800, 1–888, 1–877, or 1-866 are toll-free when being dialled from Barbados, and may be treated as a toll call. If the number is not toll-free a recording gives directions for placing a fee based call.

- To areas outside the NANP

When calling to areas outside the NANP (e.g. the United Kingdom), callers dial 011 + country code + telephone number. In the case of the UK, a user dials 011 44 + area code + telephone number.

=== Service codes ===
Police Force: 211, Ambulance: 511, Fire: 311
Information/Directory Assistance: 411
Operator: 0

== Central office codes ==
In the NANP telephone number format NPA NXX XXXX, the NXX part represents central office codes. In 1996, the following central office numbering was established by the incumbent local exchange carrier.

Location (By parish or central office)	Numbers
Christ Church	418, 420, 428
Grazettes	417, 421, 424, 425, 438
St. James	432
St. John	433
St. Lucy	439
St. Philip	423
Telebarbados	620–629
Special services	978
Speightstown	419, 422
Windsor Lodge	228, 426, 427, 429, 430, 431, 434, 435, 436, 437
Cellular	230
Spare	220

=== Mobile operators ===
Following reforms of the telecommunications industry in Barbados, various central office codes were implemented for local mobile carriers. The following central offices were outlined in 2004 by the Minister of Energy and Public Utilities. In most cases Barbados numbers beginning with the following central office codes do not permit incoming collect calls. This list was updated to include allocations for Ozone Wireless from 2014.

Digicel	Liberty Latin America (formerly bMobile, C&W, LIME)	Ozone	Sunbeach	Ace Communications International Telephony
258, 260, 261, 262, 263, 264, 265, 266, 267, 268, 269, 820, 821, 822, 823, 824, 825, 826, 827, 828, 829 (Note: (820-829), Formerly controlled by AT&T Wireless until transfer to Digicel.)	230, 231, 232, 233, 234, 235, 236, 237, 238, 239, 240, 241, 242, 243, 244, 245, 246, 247, 248, 249, 250, 251, 252, 253, 254	695, 696, 697	450, 451, 452, 453, 454, 455, 456, 457, 458, 459	776, 777, 778, 223
_{ }

=== VoIP providers ===
310 - 359

=== Geographic ===
Other landline central office codes which have been activated include the following:

227, 228, 229, 270, 271, 272, 273, 274, 292, 367, 410, 412, 414, 415, 416, 417, 418, 419, 420, 421, 422, 423, 424, 425, 426, 427, 428, 429, 430, 431, 432, 433, 434, 435, 436, 437, 438, 439, 736, 737, 753, 757, 958, 976

== See also ==
- Area codes in the Caribbean
- List of North American Numbering Plan area codes

Barbados area codes: 246
	North: Atlantic Ocean	
West: 758, 784	246	East: Atlantic Ocean
	South: 868	
Dominica area codes: 767
Martinique area codes:
Saint Lucia area codes: 758
Saint Vincent and the Grenadines area codes: 784
Guyana area codes:
Trinidad and Tobago area codes: 868
