= Can You Hear Me? =

Can You Hear Me? may refer to:

== Music ==
=== Albums ===
- Can You Hear Me?, an album by Rick Wakeman

=== Songs ===
- "Can You Hear Me?" (David Bowie song), 1974
- "Can You Hear Me" (Enrique Iglesias song), 2008
- "Can You Hear Me?" (Evermore song), 2009
- "Can You Hear Me?", a song by Charli XCX from XCX World
- "Can You Hear Me", a song by Hybrid from Disappear Here
- "Can You Hear Me? (Ayayaya)", a 2012 song by Wiley
- "Can You Hear Me" (Korn song), 2015/2019
- "Can You Hear Me", a song by Kissing the Pink (KTP) from Certain Things Are Likely
- "Can You Hear Me", a song by Mariah Carey from The Rarities
- "Can You Hear Me", a song by Missy Elliott from Under Construction
- "Can You Hear Me?", a song by Richard Fleeshman
- "Can You Hear Me", a song by Taeyeon
- Can You Hear Me? (EP), a 2013 extended play by South Korean singer IU
- "Can You Hear Me?", a song by Renaissance from Novella

== Television ==
=== Series ===
- Can You Hear Me? (2018 TV series), a 2018 French-Canadian television series
- Can You Hear Me? (2020 TV series), a 2020 Sri Lankan television series

=== Episodes ===
- "Can You Hear Me?" (Doctor Who), an episode of the twelfth series of Doctor Who
- "Can You Hear Me?" (Doctors), a 2020 episode of Doctors

== Other uses ==
- Can You Hear Me? (telephone scam), a telephone scam first reported in 2017

== See also ==
- Can You Hear Me Now? (disambiguation)
- "Can You Hear Me? (Ayayaya)", a 2012 song by Wiley
- "Papa, Can You Hear Me?", a 1983 song by Barbra Streisand
- "Tommy Can You Hear Me?", a song by The Who
