= Area code 284 =

Telephone area code for the British Virgin Islands

Coordinates: 18°27′N 64°30′W

Area code 284 is the telephone area code in the North American Numbering Plan (NANP) for the British Virgin Islands (BVI). The numbering plan area (NPA) was created in a split of the Caribbean numbering plan area (area code 809) on 1 October 1997. A permissive dialing period, during which the old area code could still be dialed, ended on 30 September 1998. Existing central office codes and line numbers were unaffected by the change of area code. New exchanges established after the in-service date, were required to be dialed with the new area code.

The digit sequence 284 spells BVI on the alphanumeric telephone keypad.

Within the British Virgin Islands, the seven digits are dialed for local calls. For calls from other NANP countries to the British Virgin Islands, the dialing sequence is 1 NPA-XXX-XXXX, where 1 is the NANP trunk access code.

== One ring scam ==
Area code 284 has been linked to a form of telephone fraud known as the "one ring scam". The person perpetuating the scam calls the victim via a robodialer or similar means, sometimes at odd hours of the night and then hangs up when the phone is answered, with the hope that the victim will be curious enough to call the number back. When the victim does this, an automatic $19.95 international call fee is charged to their account as well as $9.00/min thereafter. Similar scams have been linked to Grenada (area code 473), Antigua (area code 268), Jamaica (area codes 876 and 658) and the Dominican Republic (area code 809).

== See also ==
- List of North American Numbering Plan area codes
- Area codes in the Caribbean
- Telephone numbers in the United Kingdom

British Virgin Islands area codes: 284
	North: 441	
West: 340	284	East: 264
	South: 340	
U.S. Virgin Islands area codes: 340
Anguilla area codes: 264
Bermuda area codes: 441
