= Area code 671 =

Telephone area code for Guam

Coordinates: 13°26′37.2″N 144°47′37.4″E

The area code 671 is the telephone area code in the North American Numbering Plan (NANP) for the United States territory of Guam. It was created with the beginning of permissive dialing on July 1, 1997, replacing Guam's previous International Telecommunication Union country code 671 at the end of permissive dialing on July 1, 1998.

== Origins ==
Prior to 1997, callers from the rest of the United States had to dial '011-671' and then the seven-digit telephone number to reach Guam, similar to international calls. As international calling rates began to fall in the more competitive destination countries during the 1990s, it became a considerable financial burden for people on the United States mainland to place calls to the United States territory of Guam, especially for those who were stationed in United States military bases there.

== Calling costs ==
After Guam was added to the North American Numbering Plan, the Federal Communications Commission (FCC) regulated calls to and from Guam as "domestic", hence dramatically lowering the cost of these telephone calls. This change also opened up national toll-free numbers (as of April 2015, area codes 800, 888, 877, 866, 855 and 844) to callers from Guam, which became very popular with the advent of prepaid phone cards.

However, since no U.S. national mobile telephone carriers have a presence on Guam, cellular calls into Guam are not necessarily considered "domestic" or within the definition of "nationwide long distance".

The FCC's regulation of Guam as "domestic" has no legal effect for telephone carriers outside the United States, for whom Guam is often not a competitive destination. Therefore, calls from other countries inbound to Guam can still be relatively expensive, especially compared to outbound calls from Guam since Guam is now open to the U.S.-based phone card market through toll-free access.

== Dialing ==
Prior to 2021, within Guam, only the seven-digit phone number was necessary. When a person in Guam calls anywhere in the United States or Canada, one simply dials "1" and then the area code and phone number. For callers in the U.S. or Canada calling to Guam, one first dials '1-671', followed by the seven-digit phone number.

On October 24, 2021, area code 671 was transitioned to ten-digit dialing, despite not being part of an overlay numbering plan, in which multiple area codes are assigned to a numbering plan area. The area code had telephone numbers assigned for the central office code 988. In 2020, 988 was designated nationwide as a dialing code for the National Suicide Prevention Lifeline, which created a conflict for exchanges that still permitted seven-digit dialing.

== Prefixes ==
With a population of less than 200,000, there is only a limited need for prefixes on Guam. Currently, less than 165 of the 800 possibilities are actually in use.

Here is a list of landline prefixes on Guam and their associated geographic locations:

- 3XX: U.S. Military
- 47X: Hagåtña, Agana Heights, Asan-Maina, Piti, Chalan-Pago-Ordot, Mongmong-Toto-Maite
- 56X: Agat, Santa Rita
- 63X: Dededo
- 64X: Tamuning
- 65X: Yigo
- 73X: Mangilao, Barrigada
- 789: Yona, Talofofo
- 828: Merizo, Inarajan, Umatac
- 969: DoCoMo Pacific subscribers

== See also ==
- List of North American Numbering Plan area codes
- Communications in Guam

Guam area codes: 671
	North: 670	
West: Pacific Ocean	area code 671	East: Pacific Ocean, 808
	South: Pacific Ocean, country code +691 in Federated States of Micronesia	
Hawaii area codes: 808
Northern Mariana Islands area codes: 670
