= Hear Me Now =

Hear Me Now may refer to:

== Albums ==
- Hear Me Now (Secondhand Serenade album) or the title song, 2010
- Hear Me Now, by Donovan, 1971
- Hear Me Now, by Aika (Aikakone) or the title song, 2001

== Songs ==
- "Hear Me Now" (Alok and Bruno Martini song), 2016
- "Hear Me Now" (The Green Children song), 2006
- "Hear Me Now" (Hollywood Undead song), 2010
- "Hear Me Now", by Bad Wolves from Disobey, 2018
- "Hear Me Now", by Boyce Avenue from All We Have Left, 2010
- "Hear Me Now", by Casey Donovan from Off the Grid & Somewhere in Between, 2017
- "Hear Me Now", by Framing Hanley from The Moment, 2007
- "Hear Me Now?", by Khalil from Prove It All, 2017
- "Hear Me Now", by Artem Kotenko, Ukraine in the Junior Eurovision Song Contest 2024

== See also ==
- Can You Hear Me Now? (disambiguation)
