= Area code 345 =

Telephone area code of the Cayman Islands

Coordinates: 19°30′N 80°32′W

Area code 345 is the telephone area code in the North American Numbering Plan (NANP) for the Cayman Islands. The area code was created in a split of numbering plan area 809 which comprised many of the Caribbean islands.

After service commencement, a permissive dialing period was in effect from 1 September 1996 to 31 August 1997.

For calls within the Cayman Islands, seven-digit dialing is in effect. For all other calls the dialing rules of the NANP are in effect.

Prior to splitting from 809, the Cayman Islands used the group 94X of central office codes and five-digit dialing was possible using only the digits that followed 94.

== See also ==
- Area codes in the Caribbean
- List of North American Numbering Plan area codes
- Telephone numbers in the United Kingdom

Cayman Islands area codes: 345
	North: Country code +53 in Cuba	
West: Caribbean Sea, Country code 52 in Mexico	Area code 345	East: 658/876
	South: Caribbean Sea	
Jamaica area codes: 876/658
