= Area code 868 =

North American telephone area code for Trinidad and Tobago

Coordinates: 10°36′N 61°6′W

Telephone numbers in Trinidad and Tobago
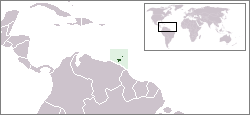
- Location of Trinidad and Tobago
- Country: Trinidad and Tobago
- Continent: North America
- Membership: NANP
- Numbering plan type: Closed
- Format: 868 nxx xxxx
- Country code: 1
- International access: 011
- Long-distance: 1

Area code 868 is a telephone area code in the North American Numbering Plan (NANP) for the Caribbean country Trinidad and Tobago. It was assigned in 1996, and has been in service since the 1st of June, 1997.

The internal telephone numbering plan of the country is known as the National Numbering Plan. It regulates the assignment of telephone numbers by the Telecommunications Authority of Trinidad and Tobago, which holds responsibility for telecommunications in the country.

Due to a long established affiliation with NANP, telephone numbers in the Republic of Trinidad and Tobago are often styled as "(868) NXX-xxxx". The International Telecommunications Union's standards such as E.164 and E.123 recommend the inclusion of a "+1" prefix to indicate 868 is a part of the NANP.

== History ==
Area code 868 was created by a split of area code 809 which had been serving all of the Caribbean until the 1990s. A permissive dialing period commenced from 1 June 1997 to 31 May 1998, after which all calls placed to the Republic of Trinidad and Tobago required the new prefix. The local telephone regulator proposed the area code 868, which spells TNT -- an abbreviation for Trinidad and Tobago -- on a telephone keypad, to reflect the nation's identity within the NANP.

== Dialing to Trinidad and Tobago ==
- From within North America (NANP)

When calling Trinidad and Tobago from elsewhere in the North American Numbering Plan (e.g., from the United States or Canada), callers dial as if undertaking regular ten-digit dialing within those countries. Callers must simply dial 1 + 868 + seven digit phone number.

- From outside NANP

When calling to Trinidad and Tobago from outside the NANP (e.g., from the United Kingdom), callers must dial their international dialing prefix followed by 1 to access the North American Numbering Plan. For example, a call placed from the United Kingdom would be dialled as 00 + 1 + 868 + local seven digit phone number.

== Dialing within Trinidad and Tobago ==
When placing a phone call from Trinidad and Tobago, also known as HNPA (home numbering plan area) dialing, callers simply use seven-digit dialing (i.e. dialing the last seven digits of the phone number).

- To North America (NANP)

When calling other places in the North American Numbering Plan, callers dial as if undertaking regular ten-digit dialing in those countries. Callers dial 1 + NPA area code + seven digit phone number.

Though usually toll-free when dialed from the US, not all 1-800 phone numbers are toll-free when dialed from Trinidad and Tobago, and may be treated as a toll call.

- To areas outside the NANP

When calling to areas outside the NANP (e.g., the United Kingdom), callers dial 011 + country calling code + phone number. In the case of the UK, a user would dial 011 + 44 + UK phone number.

=== General ===
National Operations Centre: 911, Police Force: 999, Ambulance: 811, Fire: 990
Information/Directory Assistance: 6411, 611 (proposed replacement)
Operator: 0

== See also ==
- List of North American Numbering Plan area codes
- Area codes in the Caribbean

== Notes ==
Trinidad and Tobago area codes: 868
	North: 246, 473	
West: Country code 58 in Venezuela	868	East: Atlantic Ocean
	South: Country code 58 in Venezuela	
Barbados area codes: 246
Grenada area codes: 473
