= Area code 670 =

Telephone area code for the Northern Mariana Islands

Coordinates: 15°11′N 145°45′E

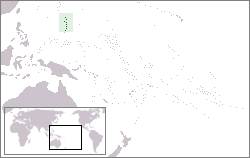
Location of Northern Mariana Islands

Area code 670 is the telephone area code in the North American Numbering Plan (NANP) for the U.S. Commonwealth of the Northern Mariana Islands (CNMI). It was created in 1997, when the administration joined the NANP and it replaced access via the International Telecommunication Union (ITU) country code 670.

== History ==
Although the Northern Mariana Islands (NMI) became a U.S. commonwealth in 1978 and the United States assumed sovereignty in 1986, calling from the United States to CNMI remained an international call with country code 670.

Area code 670 became effective on July 1, 1997, with a permissive dialing period from July 1, 1997, to July 1, 1998, during which the international code remained operational.

After the CNMI was added to the North American Numbering Plan, the U.S. Federal Communications Commission (FCC) regulated calls between the U.S. and CNMI as "domestic", causing a reduction in the cost of telephone calls and making NANP toll-free access available to callers from the CNMI, which became popular with the advent of pre-paid calling cards.

Since no mobile telephone carriers in the U.S. are present in the CNMI market, cellular calls to the CNMI are not necessarily considered "domestic" or within the definition of "nationwide long distance".

Country code 670 was later assigned to East Timor.

== Cost of international calls ==
The FCC's regulation of the CNMI as "domestic" has no legal effect for telephone carriers outside the United States, for whom the CNMI is often not a competitive destination. Therefore, calls from other countries inbound to the CNMI can still be relatively expensive, especially compared to outbound calls from the CNMI since the CNMI has access to most U.S. toll-free numbers.

== Dialing ==
Within the islands, only the seven-digit telephone number is dialed. Calls to and from other NANP regions, such as the United States or Canada, follow standard NANP dialing rules (1+10D).

Northern Mariana Islands area codes: 670
	North: Pacific Ocean	
West: Pacific Ocean	670	East: Pacific Ocean, 808
	South: 671	
Hawaii area codes: 808
Guam area codes: 671
