= Telephone numbers in Colombia =

- Country: Colombia
- Continent: South America
- Country code: +57
- International access: 00 followed by 1 or 3 digit carrier code
- Long-distance: 0 followed by 1 or 3 digit carrier code

== Number plan ==
Colombia operates a closed dialing plan, with all fixed line and mobile subscriber numbers being 10-digit. Nationally, all calls between subscribers are dialed as ten digits, with no prefix.

Number	Dialing zone or service
+57-3XX-XXXXXXX	Mobile (cellular) services
+57-601-XXXXXXX	Bogotá and Cundinamarca
+57-602-XXXXXXX	Valle del Cauca, Cauca and Nariño
+57-604-XXXXXXX	Antioquia, Chocó and Córdoba
+57-605-XXXXXXX	Atlántico, Bolívar, Cesar, La Guajira, Magdalena and Sucre
+57-606-XXXXXXX	Caldas, Risaralda and Quindío
+57-607-XXXXXXX	Norte de Santander, Santander and Arauca
+57-608-XXXXXXX	Boyacá, Tolima, Huila, San Andrés, Meta, Caquetá and the Amazon and Orinoco departments (Casanare, Vichada, Guainía, Vaupés, Guaviare, Amazonas and Putumayo)

== History ==
Prior to September 2021, Colombia had fixed line subscriber numbers that comprised a single digit dialing zone and a 7-digit local number. These were converted to the new format by inserting "60" before the dialing zone.

There were various dial plans, with different access prefixes depending on the type of service. All such prefixes have been removed, except for international calls from landlines.

== Landline service ==
All landline subscriber numbers follow the pattern:

- 60B-YXX-XXXX

Where B is the dialing zone (where the number is located), Y is 2 to 8 (or 9 for pay phones), and X is any digit.

Each department belongs to only one dialing zone. Calls from landlines to both landline and mobile numbers are placed by dialing the 10-digit subscriber number with no prefix.

Calling internationally from Colombian landlines requires a carrier-selection code be included after the 00 IDD prefix, before the country code and foreign subscriber number:

- 00A-XX... Where XX represents the destination country dialing code and A represents one of the national long-distance carriers, but new long distance operators are using 0Axy format:

00456	Claro Fijo
00444	Claro Móvil
00414	Tigo
005	Tigo
007	ETB
009	Movistar

== Mobile service ==
As with landlines, calls from mobile phones to both landline and mobile numbers are placed by dialing the 10-digit subscriber number with no prefix.

Mobile subscriber numbers follow the pattern:

- 3MM-XXX-XXXX

where 3MM usually indicates one of the country's mobile phone operators.

Prefix	Mobile operator
300 301 302 304 305 324	Tigo
302 323	[./Https://es.wikipedia.org/wiki/WOM_(Colombia) WOM]
304	Flash Mobile
304 305	ETB
305	Móvil Éxito
310 311 312 313 314 320 321 322 323	Claro, formerly known as Comcel
315 316 317 318	Movistar (ahora TIGO), fomerly known as Movistar ReBranding (MOVISTAR-TIGO, november 2026).
319	Virgin Mobile
333	Suma Movil, fomerly known as Móvil Éxito
350 351	Avantel

Since Colombia adopted the mobile number portability, these 3MM codes only indicate the original operator when the subscriber obtained the number; individual subscriber numbers may use other operators.

== Toll-free service ==
Toll-free numbers follow the pattern:

- 01-800-XXX-XXXX

Before 2002, the format was 9800-XXXXXX. When the current format was adopted in that year, existing toll-free numbers were given the format 01-800-0XX-XXXX. These numbers were advertised with the grouping 01-8000-XXX-XXX, leading many people to erroneously believe that the general prefix for toll-free numbers is 01-8000.

== Other services ==
=== Toll-based service ===
- 01-900-XXX-XXXX
- 01-901-XXX-XXXX

=== Dial-up internet service ===
- 01-947-XXX-XXXX
- 01-948-XXX-XXXX

=== Emergency numbers ===
- 1-2-3, for all emergency services.
- 1-1-2, for only Police services.
- 1-1-9, for only Firefighting services.
- 1-3-2, for only Ambulance services.
