= Area code 784 =

Telephone area code of Saint Vincent and the Grenadines

Coordinates: 12.98315°N 61.25977°W

Area code 784 is the local telephone area code of Saint Vincent and the Grenadines. 784 was chosen because it spells SVG -- an abbreviation of "St. Vincent & the Grenadines" -- on a telephone keypad. The area code was created during a split from the original 809 area code which began permissive dialing 1 June 1998 and ended 1 June 1999.

Saint Vincent and the Grenadines was the last location to break off from area code 809 during the 1995-1999 time period, when all of the various Caribbean and Atlantic geographic islands of the North American Numbering Plan which shared the 809 area code, broke off into their own unique new area codes, ultimately leaving the Dominican Republic as the sole entity retaining the 809 area code by June 1999.

When in Saint Vincent and the Grenadines, dial the local seven digit phone number alone.

When calling to Saint Vincent and the Grenadines from anywhere in the United States, Canada, and most other Caribbean islands of the North American Numbering Plan, dial 1 + 784 + the local seven digit phone number.

== See also ==
- List of NANP area codes
- Area codes in the Caribbean

Saint Vincent and the Grenadines area codes: 784
	North: 758	
West: Country code +505 in Nicaragua	Area code 784	East: 246
	South: 473	
Barbados area codes: 246
Grenada area codes: 473
Saint Lucia area codes: 758
