= Numbering Resource Utilization/Forecast Report =

Report by the North American Numbering Plan Administration

The Numbering Resource Utilization/Forecast Report (also referred to as the NRUF Report) is a semiannual report compiled by the North American Numbering Plan Administration, based on information provided by the telecom industry following United States Federal Communications Commission (FCC) rules.

== Purpose ==
The primary purposes of the NRUF report are to a) forecast the exhaust of each area code in the North American Numbering Plan, and b) to forecast the exhaust of the NANP as a whole. Other uses are made of the report as well, especially in cases of mergers between phone companies, to determine the effects of a proposed merger on the competitive nature of the industry.

== Process ==
=== Requirements ===
U.S. Carriers holding any Central Office Codes are required to submit information regarding their own numbering resource usage to the NANPA twice yearly, by February 1 and August 1 of each year, as required under CFR Title 47, Volume 3, Section 52 (f)(6)(i). Carriers that fail to submit the required information are at risk of having further requests for numbering resources being denied.

Canadian Carriers are similarly compelled by regulation to submit NRUF data to the Canadian Radio-television and Telecommunications Commission (CRTC) on an annual basis, no later than December 15 of each year (these reports would be relayed on the 1st NRUF report issued by NANPA for the following year).

=== Reports ===
Following the submission of information from carriers, NRUF reports are compiled and generally are released around the 15th of the month in which reports are due. As released by NANPA, the reports for individual NPA exhaust are sorted by physical location, area code, and exhaust date; also included is information from previous NRUF reports (for the previous six reports), as well as a change from the previous report in terms of a given NPA's exhaust date.

A report detailing the remaining lifespan of the NANP is issued as well, which details the methods used to determine the exhaust date, comparison information and how it relates to the actual estimate, and the final estimate of the exhaust for the Numbering Plan. When the remaining lifetime is estimated to be over 30 years, a date will be given in the report.

==== Latest forecasts ====
The latest reports for the NRUF process are available from on the NANPA website.

As an example, a forecast released in April 2026 for a reporting period ending March 10, 2026, predicted, at the time of the forecast, there were:

- 1 Area Code(s) projected for exhaust in 2027.
- 2 Area Code(s) projected for exhaust in 2028.
- 10 Area Code(s) projected for exhaust in 2029.
- 3 Area Code(s) projected for exhaust in 2030.
- 7 Area Code(s) projected for exhaust in 2031.
- 8 Area Code(s) projected for exhaust in 2032.

All other NPAs were projected to exhaust in 2033 or later.

The forecast exhaust for the full NANP at the time of the report was beyond the year 2061. However, a sensitivity analysis — which utilizes a higher gross demand for numbering resources of 6,228 Central Office (CO) codes per year (a 20% increase) reflected an exhaust in the year 2054.
