= Telephone numbers in Peru =

- Country: Peru
- Continent: South America
- Regulator: OSIPTEL
- Numbering plan type: open
- Country code: +51
- International access: 00
- Long-distance: 0

Telephone numbers in Peru use the country calling code +51. Mobile numbers have nine digits and begin with 9; since 4 September 2010, they have formed a nationwide, non-geographic Mobile Virtual Area, so mobile numbers do not use geographic area codes. Fixed-line numbers have seven digits in the metropolitan area of Lima and Callao and six digits elsewhere. Fixed lines use geographic area codes: Lima and Callao use code 1, while the other regions use two-digit codes; the current area-code system was established on 1 March 2003.

For domestic fixed-line calls between different areas, the trunk prefix 0 is followed by the area code and local number. International calls to Peru use +51 followed by the area code and fixed-line number, or +51 followed directly by the nine-digit mobile number. For outgoing international calls, users can select a carrier on a call-by-call basis using a four-digit 19XX carrier prefix followed by 00 and the destination number. Carrier selection is mandatory for international calls from fixed lines, while mobile callers may instead dial using + followed by the destination country code and number.

== Phone number formats ==
Telephone numbers in Peru are made of:

=== Mobile telephony ===
- Nine digits for mobile numbers across the country. The first digit is always the number nine.

=== Fixed (land) lines ===
- Seven digits in the Metropolitan Area of Lima and Callao
- Six digits in the rest of the country

== Area codes ==
Map of area codes in Peru

Peruvian area codes for each region (national subdivision) are 2 digits long except for Lima and Callao. On 1 March 2003 new codes were established.

The following is a list of the area codes in Peru:

Area code	Region
1	Lima and Callao
41	Amazonas
42	San Martín
43	Ancash
44	La Libertad
51	Puno
52	Tacna
53	Moquegua
54	Arequipa
56	Ica
61	Ucayali
62	Huánuco
63	Pasco
64	Junín
65	Loreto
66	Ayacucho
67	Huancavelica
72	Tumbes
73	Piura
74	Lambayeque
76	Cajamarca
82	Madre de Dios
83	Apurímac
84	Cusco

== Mobile phone calls within Peru (Mobile Virtual Area) ==
From September 4, 2010, a national Mobile Virtual Area was created meaning that all mobile numbers in Peru are non-geographical (not attached to any geographical region but instead to the new MVA). In addition to that all mobile numbers across the country turned to nine digits long: 9xx xxx xxx.

The following instructions are valid across the country:

=== Calls from mobile to mobile ===
    9xx xxx xxx (just dial the 9-digit number)

=== Calls from mobile to landline ===
    0 + area code + phone number
    Example on how to call to Piura: 0 + 73 + xxxxxx

=== Calls from fixed line to mobile ===
    9xx xxx xxx (just dial the 9-digit number)

== Domestic calls within Peru ==
=== Calls from fixed line to landline ===
    Call to a number in the same area: just dial the phone number

    Call to a number in another area (domestic long distance):  0 + area code + phone number.

== International long distance ==
=== Calling Peru from abroad ===
==== Calling a fixed line ====
    +51 + area code + phone number

Where the plus sign (+) represents the international access code of the country you are calling from.

From North America: 011 + 51 + area code + phone number

Example:

- Calling a fixed line in Lima: 011 51 1 1234567
- Calling a fixed line in Cusco: 011 51 84 123456
- Calling a fixed line in Machu Picchu: 011 51 84 123456

From Europe or most APAC countries: 00 + 51 + area code + phone number

==== Calling a mobile number ====
In Peru, a cell-phone number starts with a 9.

    +51 9XX XXX XXX (9-digit mobile number)

The mobile virtual area eliminates the use of area code for mobile numbers.

=== Calling abroad from Peru ===
In Peru, when making an international call you may choose a carrier for international calls different from your usual carrier/provider according to the rates carriers offer to attract callers. This system is known as "call by call" (in Spanish "Llamada por llamada") as each call can be made with a different carrier and is available to both fixed lines and mobile phones. Each carrier uses a 4-digit prefix (format 19XX).

==== International dialing format ====
This is the standard format in Peru for making calls abroad from fixed lines and mobile phones:

    19XX + 00 + country code + area code + phone number

Carriers:

- Americatel: 1977
- Claro: 1912
- IDT: 1914
- Convergia: 1960
- Movistar: 1911
- Entel: 1990 (valid only for Entel customers)
- Bitel: 1968

It is mandatory to choose a 19XX carrier when calling internationally from a fixed line.

If you are calling internationally from a mobile phone you have the option not to use the 19XX prefix. You may dial starting with the "+" symbol

    +country code + area code + phone number

and the international call will go through your provider's network.

=== Example calls ===
From Peru to USA/Canada:

- From fixed line or mobile phone: 19XX + 00 + 1 + area code + phone number
- From mobile phone (2° alternative): +1 + area code + phone number (your call will go through your usual provider's network)

== Special numbers ==
- 103 is the telephone information number
- 105 is the Police Emergency Number
- 106 is the Ambulance number
- 116 is the Fire number
- 911 is the Emergency Services number
