= Telephone numbers in Bolivia =

- Location of Bolivia (green) in South America
- Country: Bolivia
- Continent: South America
- Regulator: Autoridad de Regulación y Fiscalización de Telecomunicaciones y Transportes
- Numbering plan type: Closed
- NSN length: 8
- Format: 7 PXXXXXX
- Country code: 591
- International access: 00

Telephone numbers in Bolivia are administered by the Autoridad de Regulación y Fiscalización de Telecomunicaciones y Transportes (ATT). The national telephone numbering plan defines geographic area codes in the range from 2 to 7. No trunk prefix is required for domestic calls between numbering plan area.

The telephone country code for dialing destinations in the country from abroad is 591.

== Area codes ==
Province	Area Code
La Paz Department	2
Oruro Department	2
Potosí Department	2
Pando Department	3
Beni Department	3
Santa Cruz Department	3
Cochabamba Department	4
Chuquisaca Department	4
Tarija Department	4
national	5
cell phones	6, 7
