= False answer supervision =

False answer supervision (FAS) refers to VoIP fraud where the billed duration for the caller is more than the duration of the actual connection duration. The FAS is usually performed by VoIP wholesalers in their softswitches for randomly selected calls. Adding a small amount of extra billed seconds for many calls results in significant revenue for the VoIP wholesaler.

== Implementation of FAS ==
The FAS fraud can be implemented in a softswitch in many different ways. These include:

- False billing of party A without calling a party B. Usually a fake ringback tone, loopback audio or voicemail message is played
- Start of billing before actual answer of party B
- Extra billing after disconnection of party B

== Detection of FAS ==
The FAS can be detected and blocked in a softswitch. Common methods are:

- Manual verification of call detail records: listening to voice recordings
- Identification of FAS types and using algorithms to automatically detect the FAS
  - RTP audio signal processing: detection of voice
  - RTP audio signal processing: detection of silence
  - RTP audio signal processing: detection of ringback tone

== See also ==
- Phone fraud
- Softswitch
- Telecommunications billing
- Voice over IP
