= Telephone numbers in Puerto Rico =

Coordinates: 18.2223°N 66.4303°W

Telephone numbers in Puerto Rico are assigned under the North American Numbering Plan (NANP).

The NANP area codes for the island are 787 and 939.

Since c. 1958, Puerto Rico had been a constituent of the Caribbean numbering plan area (NPA) with area code 809, which was divided into country-specific numbering plan areas during the 1990s. On March 1, 1996, Puerto Rico began using the newly assigned area code 787. A permissive dialing period for 809 ended January 31, 1997.

Within only four years, 787 was already threatened by number exhaustion due to the proliferation of cell phones and dial-up Internet access. The country's numbering plan area was overlaid with area code 939 on September 15, 2001, which mandated ten-digit dialing for all telephone calls.

== See also ==
- Area codes in the Caribbean
- List of North American Numbering Plan area codes

Puerto Rico area codes: 787/939
	North: Atlantic Ocean	
West: 809/829/849	787/939	East: 340
	South: Caribbean Sea	
Dominican Republic area codes: 809/829/849
U.S. Virgin Islands area codes: 340
