= Utility scam =

Type of scam

Utility scams are fraudulent acts where a perpetrator calls or arrives unannounced at a utility customer's house in an attempt to take money or sell unnecessary energy accessories through misrepresentation. Often, the fraud involves telling the victim that he or she owes the utility company money and that their power, gas, or water will be shut off immediately unless payment is made.

== Background ==
Each year, according to the Internet Crimes Complaint Center, Americans are scammed out of approximately $239 million. A Harris poll found that around 17.6 million Americans are scammed via the telephone each year. A portion of fraudulent emails and phone calls are utility scams.

== Procedure ==
A scammer calls or stops by the residence of a utility customer and claims that the utility company has not received payment for the customer's bill. The scammer demands immediate payment and usually threatens immediate shut-off of electricity, gas, or water if a payment is not made. Customers can have difficulty distinguishing scammers from legitimate utility employees because the scammer can look and sound legitimate.

Sometimes, a customer will panic after receiving such a call or in-person visit. The customer finds a quick way to pay, which can include a range of payment types including credit card, Apple iTunes, store gift card, or a money transfer.

According to the Star Tribune, "Often the caller demands that the customers drive to a store and buy a prepaid debit card to make the payment. Usually there is a strict deadline, often less than an hour to pay."

“This is very much a science,” said Lisa Jemtrud, of the Better Business Bureau of Minnesota and North Dakota. “What works is urgency, that they have to act fast, and also scare tactics.”

Usually, the scammer tries to get a few hundred dollars from the victim.

Another type of fraud occurs when a scammer calls a utility customer and offers a rebate if the customer makes a payment or gives out personal information. These are red flags, experts say.

Some scam artists can disguise their phone number to make it look as though the real utility company is calling. Some scammers "use the legitimate company’s hold music and typical automated introduction to deceive customers who call them back."

Some scammers can mimic what a legitimate utility company employee may sound like.

Among the largest targets for this type of fraud are elderly people and people with language barriers.

Experts warn people to watch for callers that are aggressive and threaten to shut off utility services within a short period of time, and who often demand payment via a pre-paid credit card.

According to a consumer warning by the U.S. Federal Trade Commission, "Once you wire money or use a prepaid card, your money is gone for good."

== Prevalence ==
Utility companies have reported getting thousands of attempted fraud each year.

Duke Energy said that from June 2015 through October 2016, it received customer calls related to 7,497 scam attempts; out of those attempts, 634 customers paid the scammers and lost $631,000 collectively. Between June 2015 and July 2017, there were approximately $1 million in total losses reported by Duke Energy customers among 15,000 scam reports.

According to Hiya, a company that makes caller blocking software, "We've seen triple digit growth in utility scams in the past year [2016-2017]."

When winter begins, reported scams increase around 30 percent.

== Industry response ==
Utility companies are trying to stop these types of scams from taking place. A coalition of utilities (including electric, natural gas, and water) across North America started a public campaign called "Utilities United Against Scams" (UUAS) in 2016. More than 100 utility companies and other groups are part of the coalition.

In November each year, the UUAS hosts a "Utilities United Against Scams Day." In 2016, the U.S. House of Representatives designated Utility Scam Awareness Day each November.

All 1-800 phone numbers must be registered with Somos, a non-profit group. When a utility gets a customer complaint about a possible fraud, the utility can send the 1-800 number used by the scammers to Somos to have the number investigated, and ultimately disconnected. As of September 2017, the UUAS coalition has had Somos cancel between 250 and 300 scammer phone numbers.

== Types ==
=== Shutoff swindle ===
In this type of scam, a utility customer receives a phone call from a scammer pretending to be from their utility company. The scammer warns the customer that their service is about to be shut off because of unpaid bills. They typically tell the victim that in order for their water, gas, or power to stay on, the victim must provide an immediate payment using a credit card or prepaid debit card. According to the AARP, people across the country have fallen prey to this type of scam. The AARP warns people that most utilities will mail at least one past due notice before turning off water, gas, or electricity.

=== Supplier switch ===
In this swindle, a supplier will call or door knock and tell them that they qualify for a discount on their utility bill if they provide their customer account number. This is not a scam, it is a legitimate program offered in deregulated markets. After doing so, the scammer switches the customer to a different supplier; the utility is not their supplier but they may be in a contract with a different supplier with a lower rate or an ETF. Sometimes but certainly not always, after a brief introductory period, rates may suddenly skyrocket. People who do not listen to the term being offered can find themselves locked in long-term contracts. "Slamming" is the illegal practice of changing a customer to another provider without the customer's permission.

=== Inspection deception ===
The AARP warns elderly Americans to "beware of utility company impostors or independent 'energy auditors' that tend to appear unannounced at your front door."

In this type of scam, an imposter or "independent energy auditor" appears unannounced at the victim's home. They typically offer a free inspection of their thermostat, furnace, or home's energy leakage. The scammers are usually salespeople or "home improvement hucksters" selling unnecessary expensive products. For example, some scammers will sell a $4,000 solar blanket for the attic "that in fact can't live up to its claimed ability to capture the sun's rays through roofing materials."

The Consumer Federation of America listed free energy audits as an expanding problem in its top customer complaints list.

== See also ==
- Fraud
- Phone fraud
