= Area code 664 =

NANP area code for Montserrat

Coordinates: 17°36′45″N 62°16′53″W

Area code 664 is a telephone area code in the North American Numbering Plan (NANP) for Montserrat, a British Overseas Territory in the Caribbean. The digits of the area code translate to MNI in the alphanumeric mapping on telephone dials. The area code was created in a split of area code 809, which had been assigned in the 1960s to all of the Caribbean islands. All existing central office codes and telephone numbers were carried from area code 809 to 664, as established. A permissive dialing period was conducted from 1 July 1996 to 1 June 1997 during which use of either area code was permitted for calls into the country terminating in previously established central offices. Destinations with newly issued central office codes required the new area code.

A local call within Montserrat is dialed with seven digits. A call from another North American Numbering Plan country (such as the United States or Canada) requires dialing the long-distance access code (1), the NPA code, and the seven-digit telephone number.

At one time the small island of Montserrat used only four-digit telephone numbers internally, as the first three digits after the former 809 area code were the same for everyone (491). As of May 2011, Montserrat has seven-digit numbers beginning with 236, 349, 410, 411, 412, 413, 415, 491, 492, 493, 494, 495, 496, 664, and 724.

== See also ==
- Area codes in the Caribbean
- List of North American Numbering Plan area codes

Montserrat area codes: 664
| | North: 268, 869 | |
| West: Caribbean Sea | 664 | East: 268 |
| | South: Country code 590 in Guadeloupe | |
Saint Kitts and Nevis area codes: 869
Antigua and Barbuda area codes: 268
