= Area code 758 =

Area code for Saint Lucia

Coordinates: 13°53′00″N 60°58′00″W

Area code 758 is the telephone area code in the North American Numbering Plan (NANP) for Saint Lucia. The area code represents the alphabetic sequence SLU on the alphanumeric telephone dial. The numbering plan area (NPA) was created by a split from the original NPA 809, which began permissive dialing on 1 July 1996 and ended 1 January 1997.

Dialing locally in Saint Lucia, seven-digit dialing is in effect. Calling to Saint Lucia from anywhere in the NANP countries follows NANP rules by dialing 1, area code 758, and the seven-digit phone number.

== See also ==
- Area codes in the Caribbean
- List of North American Numbering Plan area codes

Saint Lucia area codes: 758
| | North: Country code +596 in Martinique | |
| West: Caribbean Sea | Area code 758 | East: 246 |
| | South: 784 | |
Barbados area codes: 246
Saint Vincent and the Grenadines area codes: 784
