= Area code 869 =

Telephone area code for Saint Kitts and Nevis

Coordinates: 17°20′N 62°45′W

Area code 869 is the local telephone area code of Saint Kitts and Nevis. The 869 area code was created during a split from the original (809) area code which began permissive dialing on 1 October 1996 and ended 31 March 1997.

When in Saint Kitts and Nevis, only seven-digit dialing is needed. When calling to Saint Kitts and Nevis from anywhere in the United States or Canada 1 + (869) + the seven digits needs to be dialed, i.e. 1 + 869 555 1212.

== See also ==
- List of NANP area codes
- North American Numbering Plan
- Area codes in the Caribbean

Saint Kitts and Nevis area codes: 869
	North: Country code +599 in Sint Eustatius	
West: Caribbean Sea	Area code 869	East: 268
	South: 664	
Montserrat area codes: 664
Antigua and Barbuda area codes: 268
