= Area code 264 =

Telephone area code of Anguilla

Coordinates: 18.2°N 63.05°W

Area code 264 is the telephone area code in the North American Numbering Plan (NANP) of Anguilla. The area code was created in a split of the original numbering plan area in the Caribbean (809). 264 was chosen because it spells ANG -- the first three letters of the name of the nation -- on a telephone keypad.

In Anguilla, a local telephone number is dialed using the seven digits of the directory number. Calls from other NANP countries, including the United States, require dialing the long-distance trunk prefix (1), the area code and the seven-digit number.

Prior to the 1990s, subscribers in Anguilla dialed just three digits for a local call, and had the only four-digit national number in the 809 area code: 4972.

== See also ==
- List of North American Numbering Plan area codes
- Area codes in the Caribbean
- Telephone numbers in the United Kingdom

Anguilla area codes: 264
	North: Atlantic Ocean	
West: 284	264	East: Atlantic Ocean
	South: Country code 590 in Saint Martin, area code 721 in Sint Maarten	
British Virgin Islands area codes: 284
