= Choke exchange =

Telephone exchange designed to handle many simultaneous call attempts

A choke exchange is a telephone exchange designed to handle many simultaneous call attempts to telephone numbers of that exchange. Choke exchanges are typically used to service telephone numbers of talk radio caller and contest lines of radio stations and event ticket vendors.

== Motivation ==
A central office might only have physical plant resources to handle ca. 8% of allocated telephone numbers, based on historical call traffic averages. A choke exchange has trunk facilities to other exchanges designed in a manner that high call volume is handled through the choke connection rather than overwhelming the rest of the local telephone network. Other local exchanges have a limited number of direct trunks (junctions) to the choke exchange, which may only serve one or more customers, such as a radio station contest line, which may experience many simultaneous calls. But instead of calls being overflowed to main or tandem routes shared with other calls, the unsuccessful callers receive a reorder tone from their local or tandem exchange. If the calls were overflowed to the tandem route, the caller would receive a busy tone from the exchange serving the radio station, and the sudden peak would disrupt calls between other customers.

With common-channel signaling (CCS), e.g., Signalling System No. 7, separate choke exchanges may not be required for these customers.

== Examples ==
Examples of choke exchanges in North America have included:

| Central office (NPA–NXX) | Location |
| 202–432 | Washington, DC |
| 204-780 | Winnipeg, Manitoba |
| 205–741 | Birmingham, Alabama |
| 206–421 | Seattle, Washington |
| 212–955 | New York, New York |
| 213–520 | Los Angeles, California |
| 818–520 | Los Angeles, California |
| 214–787 | Dallas, Texas |
| 215–263 | Philadelphia, Pennsylvania |
| 216–578 | Cleveland, Ohio |
| 225–499 | Baton Rouge, Louisiana |
| 305–550 | Miami, Florida |
| 312–591 | Chicago, Illinois |
| 313–298 | Detroit, Michigan |
| 314–969 | St. Louis, Missouri |
| 337–920 | Lafayette, Louisiana |
| 401–224 | Providence, Rhode Island |
| 402–962 | Omaha, Nebraska |
| 404–741 | Atlanta, Georgia (770 from 1995 to 1998) |
| 770–741 | Atlanta, Georgia (770 from 1995 to 1998) |
| 410–481 | Baltimore, Maryland |
| 412–333 | Pittsburgh, Pennsylvania |
| 414–799 | Milwaukee, Wisconsin |
| 415–478 | San Francisco, California |
| 416–870, –872 | Toronto, Ontario |
| 501–433 | Little Rock, Arkansas |
| 502–571 | Louisville, Kentucky |
| 504–260 | New Orleans, Louisiana |
| 512–390 | Austin, Texas |
| 513–749 | Cincinnati, Ohio |
| 514–790 | Montreal, Quebec |
| 585–222 | Rochester, New York |
| 604–280 | Vancouver, British Columbia |
| 613–750 | Ottawa, Ontario |
| 614–821 | Columbus, Ohio |
| 615–737 | Nashville, Tennessee |
| 617–931 | Boston, Massachusetts |
| 651–989 | Minneapolis/St. Paul, Minnesota |
| 704–570 | Charlotte, North Carolina |
| 713–390 | Houston, Texas |
| 714–977 | Orange County, California |
| 716–644 | Buffalo, New York |
| 817–787 | Fort Worth, Texas |
| 901–535 | Memphis, Tennessee |
| 916–766 | Sacramento, California |
| 919–860 | Raleigh-Durham, North Carolina |
| 619–570 | San Diego, California |

One of the early choke lines (exchanges) was instituted due to a widely advertised contest by a local radio station in the Miami/Fort Lauderdale area. WHYI-FM advertised their "Last Contest". The top prize was an automobile. Since the advertising lasted over a month, there were a very large volume of calls when they announced for people to call in. There were so many calls that the local exchanges ran out of dial tones. This caused major issues since at the time if a caller had no dial tone, the caller could not dial at all. After it was over, the area emergency services filed complaints, and were heard. Shortly afterward the 305-550 exchange came into being. The first number on it was 305-550-9100 (for Y100 radio station). Due to the issues involved because of the "Last Contest", this may have been what caused the creation of the choke exchanges.

== See also ==
- Routing in the PSTN
