= Area code 767 =

Area code of Dominica

Coordinates: 15.45368°N 61.34766°W

Area code 767 is the telephone area code in the North American Numbering Plan (NANP) for the Commonwealth of Dominica. Area 767 was created with the start of permissive dialing on 1 October 1997, ending 30 September 1998, as a split from area code 809, which formerly covered 19 Caribbean territories. The number 767 corresponds to the letters ROS on the alphanumeric telephone dial, and is a mnemonic for Roseau, Dominica's capital city.

== See also ==
- Area codes in the Caribbean
- List of NANP area codes

Dominica area codes: 767
	North: Country code +590 in Guadeloupe	
West: Caribbean Sea	Area code 767	East: Atlantic Ocean
	South: Country code +596 in Martinique	
