= Ozone Wireless =

Defunct Barbadian telecommunications provider

- Company type: Private
- Industry: Telecommunications
- Founded: 2011
- Headquarters: Manor Lodge at Green Hill; (Bridgetown Metropolitan area), St. Michael, Barbados
- Products: Mobile telephony & Wireless Broadband internet(4G & LTE Fixed and Mobile) services.
- Owner: Lester Edwards, CEO
- Number of employees: 11-50
- Website: https://www.ozonewireless.com/

Ozone Wireless, or Ozone, was a Barbadian mobile network operator and telecommunications company founded in 2011. Ozone was one of three major mobile operators in the country.

== Network information ==
The IMSI - Network Code of Ozone is 342-800 and the MSISDN Network Codes are: 695 (international: +1 246 695), 696 (international: +1 246 696) and 697 (international: +1 246 697).

Through colocation agreements, and organic growth the company started with an LTE network to provide service across the island of Barbados. The company has deployed a 4G LTE network on Band 13, providing peak data rates of up to 50 Mbit/s.

== Services ==
Ozone, offers its customers: post and pre-paid subscription packages, SMS / MMS, international wifi only roaming, voicemail, mobile hotspots.

== Smartphones ==
As of 2018 Ozone Wireless offers the following smartphones for use on its network.

- Apple iPhone (several models)
- Huawei Y5 II
- Samsung J7 NEO
- Samsung S7 Edge
- Samsung S8

== See also ==
- List of mobile network operators of the Americas
