= Claro Colombia =

Colombian telecommunication operator

- Company type: Subsidiary of América Móvil
- Founded: Bogotá, Barranquilla, Cali and Medellín, Colombia (1996)
- Headquarters: Bogotá, Colombia
- Key people: Carlos Slim Helu
- Products: telephone, mobile telephone, internet, digital television
- Parent: América Móvil
- Website: claro.com.co

Claro Colombia is a Colombian telecommunications operator, owned by Mexican group América Móvil. Claro is the largest provider of mobile phone services in the country – as of December 2011, 28,818,791 of Colombia's 46,200,421 mobile phone subscribers (62.38%) were with Claro's predecessor, Comcel.

The company was formed on June 26, 2012 from the merger of Comcel, previously Colombia's largest mobile phone operator, and the smaller Telmex, also owned by América Móvil. The unified company's name was changed to Claro in keeping with its other operations in Latin America.
