= Area code 441 =

Telephone area code of Bermuda

Coordinates: 32°18′N 64°46′W

Area code 441 is the telephone area code in the North American Numbering Plan (NANP) for Bermuda. The numbering plan area (NPA) was created on 1 October 1995 in a split of area code 809.

== History ==
In 1958, the American Telephone and Telegraph Company (AT&T) assigned area code 809 for telephone communication services in Bermuda and the Caribbean islands. Cuba, Haiti, the Netherlands Antilles, and the French West Indies decided not to participate in the North American Numbering Plan. Beginning with Bermuda in November 1994, and The Bahamas, Puerto Rico, and Barbados in 1995, several countries in the Caribbean requested individual area code assignments from the NANPA, effectively splitting area code 809. The area code was retained only by the Dominican Republic,

Bermuda requested its individual area code assignment on 16 November 1994. A permissive dialing period in 441 commenced from 1 October 1995 until 30 September 1996. When calling from countries and territories outside the North American Numbering Plan, the area code is prefixed by the international access code and the country code 1; for example from the United Kingdom, subscribers would dial 00 1 441.

== See also ==
- Area codes in the Caribbean
- List of North American Numbering Plan area codes
- Telephone numbers in the British Overseas Territories

Bermuda area codes: 441
	North: Atlantic Ocean	
West: Atlantic Ocean, 252	441	East: Atlantic Ocean
	South: Atlantic Ocean, 284	
North Carolina area codes: 252, 336/743, 704/980, 828, 910/472, 919/984
British Virgin Islands area codes: 284
