= Area code 649 =

Telephone area code of the Turks and Caicos Islands

Coordinates: 21°49′N 71°48′W

Area code 649 is the local telephone area code of the Turks and Caicos Islands. Area 649 was created in a split from the original area code 809. It became effective 1 June 1997 and mandatory on 31 May 1998.

Calls within the Turks and Caicos Islands are dialled with seven digits. Calls to the Turks and Caicos Islands from within the North American Numbering Plan (which includes the United States, Canada and a number of Caribbean islands) are dialed like any other long-distance call: 1 649 xxx xxxx.

From the 1980s to 1997, the islands had just 946, then later also 941, as exchange prefixes.

== See also ==
- List of NANP area codes
- North American Numbering Plan
- Area codes in the Caribbean
- Telephone numbers in the United Kingdom

Turks and Caicos Islands area codes: 649
	North: +1242	
West: Country Code +53 in Cuba	Area code 649	East: Atlantic Ocean
	South: +1809/+1829/+1849, CC +509 in Haiti	
Bahamas area codes: 242
Dominican Republic area codes: 809/829/849
