= Telephone numbers in Haiti =

Country Code: +509
International Call Prefix: 00

Nationally Significant Numbers (NSN): eight digits.

Format: +509 XX XX XXXX

Telephone numbers in the Republic of Haiti increased from seven to eight digits on 1 March 2008.

== Number plan ==
List of allocations
Usage	Former number plan	Current number plan	Operator
International dial prefix (or +)	00	00	(All operators)
Special services (emergency and assistance)	1XX	1XX	(All operators)
Fixed telephony (NSN)	2XX XXXX	22 XX XXXX	NATCOM
Fixed telephony (NSN)	5XX XXXX	25 XX XXXX	(former HAITEL, unallocated)
Fixed telephony (NSN)	—	281 X XXXX	DIGICEL
Fixed telephony (NSN)	—	291 X XXXX	ComCEL (now part of DIGICEL)
Fixed telephony (NSN)	—	294 X XXXX	ComCEL (now part of DIGICEL)
Fixed telephony (NSN)	—	299 X XXXX	ComCEL (now part of DIGICEL)
Mobile telephony (NSN)	—	30 XX XXXX	DIGICEL
Mobile telephony (NSN)	—	31 XX XXXX	DIGICEL
Mobile telephony (NSN)	—	32 XX XXXX	NATCOM
Mobile telephony (NSN)	—	33 XX XXXX	NATCOM
Mobile telephony (NSN)	4XX XXXX	34 XX XXXX	ComCEL (now part of DIGICEL)
Mobile telephony (NSN)	5XX XXXX	35 XX XXXX	(former HAITEL, unallocated)
Mobile telephony (NSN)	6XX XXXX	36 XX XXXX	DIGICEL
Mobile telephony (NSN)	7XX XXXX	37 XX XXXX	DIGICEL
Mobile telephony (NSN)	8XX XXXX	38 XX XXXX	DIGICEL
Mobile telephony (NSN)	90X XXXX	39 0X XXXX	ComCEL (now part of DIGICEL)
Mobile telephony (NSN)	91X XXXX (except 911)	39 1X XXXX	ComCEL (now part of DIGICEL)
Mobile telephony (NSN)	92X XXXX	39 2X XXXX	ComCEL (now part of DIGICEL)
Mobile telephony (NSN)	93X XXXX	39 3X XXXX	ComCEL (now part of DIGICEL)
Mobile telephony (NSN)	94X XXXX	39 4X XXXX	ComCEL (now part of DIGICEL)
Mobile telephony (NSN)	99X XXXX	39 9X XXXX	ComCEL (now part of DIGICEL)
Mobile telephony (NSN)	—	40 XX XXXX	NATCOM
Mobile telephony (NSN)	—	41 XX XXXX	NATCOM
Mobile telephony (NSN)	—	42 XX XXXX	NATCOM
Mobile telephony (NSN)	—	43 XX XXXX	NATCOM
(Reserved)	—	5X XX XXXX	(Reserved)
(Reserved)	—	6X XX XXXX	(Reserved)
(Reserved)	—	7X XX XXXX	(Reserved)
Toll-free numbers (numéros verts)	—	800 XXX XX	(All operators)
Value-added services	—	81 XX	(All operators)
Value-added services	—	82 XX	(All operators)
Value-added services	—	83 XX	(All operators)
Value-added services	—	84 XX	(All operators)
Value-added services	—	85 XX	(All operators)
Value-added services	—	86 XX	(All operators)
National emergency call number	911	911	(All operators)
VoIP (NSN)	—	96X X XXXX	(former LC2K S.A., unallocated)
VoIP (NSN)	—	970 X XXXX	HDN
VoIP (NSN)	—	971 X XXXX	HDN
VoIP (NSN)	—	972 X XXXX	HDN
VoIP (NSN)	—	973 X XXXX	HDN
VoIP (NSN)	—	974 X XXXX	HDN
VoIP (NSN)	80X XXXX	980 X XXXX	HAINET
VoIP (NSN)	81X XXXX	981 X XXXX	HAINET
VoIP (NSN)	82X XXXX	982 X XXXX	HAINET
VoIP (NSN)	83X XXXX	983 X XXXX	HAINET
VoIP (NSN)	85X XXXX	985 X XXXX	HAINET
VoIP (NSN)	—	986 X XXXX	GILBELL
VoIP (NSN)	—	989 X XXXX	ACN
VoIP (NSN)	—	990 X XXXX	MULTILINK S.A.
VoIP (NSN)	—	991 X XXXX	MULTILINK S.A.
VoIP (NSN)	—	992 X XXXX	MULTILINK S.A.
VoIP (NSN)	—	993 X XXXX	MULTILINK S.A.
VoIP (NSN)	—	994 X XXXX	MULTILINK S.A.
VoIP (NSN)	—	995 X XXXX	ACCESS HAITI
VoIP (NSN)	—	996 X XXXX	ACCESS HAITI
VoIP (NSN)	—	997 X XXXX	ACCESS HAITI
VoIP (NSN)	—	998 X XXXX	ACCESS HAITI
VoIP (NSN)	—	999 X XXXX	ACCESS HAITI

Haiti area codes:
	North: +1 649	
West: Country code +53 in Cuba, +1 876	+509 in Haiti	East: +1 809/829/849
	South: Caribbean Sea	
Dominican Republic area codes: 809/829/849
Turks and Caicos Islands area codes: 649
