= Can You Hear Me Now? =

Can You Hear Me Now? may refer to:

- Can You Hear Me Now, an album by Sawyer Brown, or the title song
- "Can You Hear Me Now?" (CSI: NY), an episode of CSI: NY
- "Can You Hear Me Now?" (Pretty Little Liars), an episode of Pretty Little Liars
- "Can you hear me now?", a line from a series of television advertisements for Verizon Wireless by actor Paul Marcarelli

== See also ==
- "Can You Ear Me Now?", a 2016 episode of Regular Show
