= Can you hear me? (alleged telephone scam) =

Alleged telephone scam

"Can you hear me?" is a question asked in an alleged telephone scam, sometimes classified as an internet hoax. There is no record of anyone having ever been defrauded in such a scam, according to the Better Business Bureau, the Federal Trade Commission, and the Consumer Federation of America. Reports of the supposed scam began circulating in the United States and Canada in 2017.

It is alternatively known as the say "yes" scam. Reports on this hoax and its circulation on social media sites have continued into the 2020s in the United States. Government entities, such as police departments or state financial agencies, have sometimes unknowingly contributed to the credibility of the hoax by reporting it to the public as it if was factual.

Security experts have explained that the calls were likely an automated dialer employed by a telemarketing firm to confirm the authenticity of the telephone numbers on its dialing lists, not an attempt at financial fraud.

== Origin ==
Reports on the purported scam are an Internet hoax, first spread on social media sites in 2017. While the phone calls received by people are real, the calls are not related to scam activity.

According to some news reports on the hoax, victims of the purported fraud receive telephone calls from an unknown person who asks, "Can you hear me?" Some reports suggest that the calls are an attempt to record the person saying the word "Yes", in order to then claim the person agreed to authorize charges to a scammer; such claims have been debunked. Between January and February 2017, the existence of the scam was reported by multiple media outlets including CBS News and NPR affiliate WNYC-FM. In January 2017, Seattle NBC affiliate KING-TV contacted police agencies in western Washington and reported no authorities had heard of the scam; in a follow-up story the next month, the station reported that many police in the area had since received concerned inquiries about "the scam that was sweeping the country".

In early February 2017, a local British Columbia newspaper, The Delta Optimist, reported that consumers had made a "few complaints" about the calls being received in Canada.

On March 27, 2017, the Federal Communications Commission issued a report about the alleged scam. The agency stated that they had received consumer complaints about the calls, and that news outlets had also reported the calls as ongoing.

In 2024, the Better Business Bureau published an article stating that consumers have continued to report such calls to the BBB Scam Tracker. The article stated that no consumers reported any monetary loss as a result of such calls.

== Veracity ==
Investigating reports of the supposed scam, Snopes noted that all purported scam targets only reported being victimized after hearing about the scam in news reports. Snopes had contacted the Better Business Bureau, the Federal Trade Commission, and the Consumer Federation of America, none of whom could provide evidence of an individual having been financially defrauded after receiving one of the telephone calls. Snopes also analyzed several news reports in which the media interviewed self-identified victims of the scam; in the stories it looked at, nobody reported having been financially defrauded after receiving one of the phone calls. Snopes ultimately classified the claims as "unproven".

An official at the caller ID company Hiya has explained that the purported calls were likely an automated dialer employed by a telemarketing firm to confirm the authenticity of the telephone numbers on its dialing lists, not an attempt at financial fraud.
