= Telephone numbers in Nicaragua =

Country Code: +505
International Call Prefix: 00

National Significant Number (NSN): eight digits.

Format: +505 XXXX XXXX

The Republic of Nicaragua has a closed numbering plan of eight digits.

The change from seven to eight digits occurred in 2009, by adding

- digit 2 (two) before the existing National Significant Number (NSN) for fixed services,
- digit 8 (eight) before the existing National Significant Number (NSN) for mobile services.
- digit 7 (seven) before the existing National Significant Number (NSN) for mobile services.
- digit 5 (five) before the existing National Significant Number (NSN) for mobile services.
- digit 8 (eight) after the existing National Significant Number (NSN) for mobile services; Example: +505 22222222

== See also ==
- Telecommunications in Nicaragua
