= North American Numbering Plan =

Integrated telephone numbering plan of twenty North American countries

- Countries participating in the North American Numbering Plan
- NSN length: 10
- Format: NXX NXX-XXXX
- Country code: 1
- International access: 011
- Long-distance: 1

The North American Numbering Plan (NANP) is an integrated telephone numbering plan for twenty-five regions in twenty countries, primarily in North America and the Caribbean. This group is historically known as World Numbering Zone 1 and has the country code 1. Some North American countries, most notably Mexico, do not participate in the NANP.

The concepts of the NANP were devised in the 1940s in Operator Toll Dialing on the basis of the General Toll Switching Plan by the American Telephone and Telegraph Company (AT&T) for the Bell System and the independent telephone companies in North America. The first task was to unify the diverse local telephone numbering plans that had been established during the preceding decades, with the goal to speed call completion times and decrease the costs for long-distance calling, by reducing manual labor by switchboard operators. Eventually, it prepared the continent for direct-dialing of long-distance calls by customers, first possible in 1951, which expanded across the nation during the decades following. AT&T continued to administer the continental numbering plan and the technical infrastructure until the end of the Bell System, when operation was delegated to the North American Numbering Plan Administration (NANPA), a service that has been procured from the private sector by the Federal Communications Commission (FCC) in the United States. Each participating country forms a regulatory authority that has plenary control of local numbering resources. The FCC also serves as the U.S. regulator. Canadian numbering decisions are made by the Canadian Numbering Administration Consortium.

The NANP divides the territories of its members into numbering plan areas (NPAs) which are encoded numerically with a three-digit telephone number prefix, commonly termed the area code. Each telephone is assigned a seven-digit telephone number unique only within its respective numbering plan area. The telephone number consists of a three-digit central office (or exchange) code and a four-digit station number. The combination of an area code and the telephone number serves as a destination routing address in the public switched telephone network (PSTN). The North American Numbering Plan conforms with International Telecommunication Union (ITU) Recommendation E.164, which establishes an international numbering framework.

== History ==
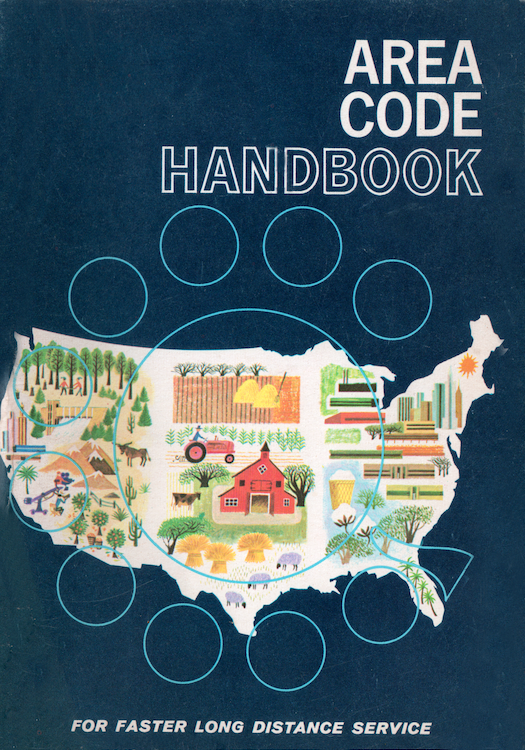
Area code handbook issued by many telephone companies in 1962 to promote the newly introduced direct distance dialing.

From the Bell System's beginnings in 1876 and throughout the first part of the 20th century, telephone networks grew from essentially local or regional telephone systems. These systems expanded by growing their subscriber bases, as well as enlarging their service areas by implementing additional local exchanges that were interconnected with tie trunks. It was the responsibility of each local administration to devise telephone numbering plans that accommodated the local requirements and growth. As a result, the North American telephone service industry developed into an unorganized set of many differing local numbering systems. The diversity impeded the efficient operation and interconnection of exchanges into a nationwide system for long-distance telephone communication. By the 1940s, the Bell System set out to unify the various existing numbering plans to provide a unified, systematic concept for routing telephone calls across the nation, and to provide efficient long-distance service that eventually did not require the involvement of switchboard operators.

In October 1947, AT&T published the first nationwide numbering plan in coordination with the independent telephone operators. The plan divided most of North America into eighty-six numbering plan areas (NPAs). Each NPA was assigned a unique three-digit code, typically termed NPA code or simply area code. These codes were first used in Operator Toll Dialing by long-distance operators in establishing calls via trunks between toll offices. The goal of automatic service required additional technical advances in the latest generation of toll-switching systems, completed by the early 1950s, and installation of new toll-switching systems in most numbering plan areas. The first customer-dialed direct call using an area code was made on November 10, 1951, from Englewood, New Jersey, to Alameda, California. Direct distance dialing (DDD) was introduced subsequently across the country. By the early 1960s, DDD had become commonplace in cities and most towns in the United States and Canada. By 1967, the number of assigned area codes had grown to 129.

The status of the network of the 1960s was reflected by a new name used in technical documentation: North American Integrated Network. By 1975, the numbering plan was referred to as the North American Numbering Plan, resulting in the well-known initialism NANP, as other countries sought or considered joining the standardization.

=== Foreign expansion ===
Although Bermuda and the Caribbean islands had been assigned the area code 809 as early as 1958 by the administrators at AT&T, individual participating countries or territories had no autonomy over their numbering plan as they received centrally assigned central office prefixes that needed to be unique from those of other countries with the same area code. Regions in Mexico with high call volumes to and from the US were assigned functional area codes as early as 1963, for the purpose of call routing, but a nationwide system of participation in the NANP eventually failed.

During the decades following, the NANP expanded to include all of the United States and its territories, Canada, Bermuda, and seventeen nations of the Caribbean.

Not all North American polities participate in the NANP. Exceptions include Mexico, Greenland, Saint Pierre and Miquelon, the Central American countries and some Caribbean countries (Cuba, Haiti, the French Caribbean and the Dutch Caribbean other than Sint Maarten). The only Spanish-speaking jurisdictions in the system are the Dominican Republic and Puerto Rico. Mexican participation was planned, but implementation stopped after three area codes (903, 905, 706) had been used, and Mexico opted for an international numbering format, using country code 52. The area codes in use were subsequently withdrawn in 1991.

Sint Maarten, a Dutch Caribbean constituent, joined the NANP in 2011, being assigned area code 721. Sint Maarten shares the island of St. Martin with the French Collectivity of Saint Martin which, like the rest of the French Caribbean, is not a NANP member.

== Administration ==
The NANP is administered by the North American Numbering Plan Administrator (NANPA, formerly Administration). This function is overseen by the Federal Communications Commission (FCC), which assumed the responsibility upon the federally mandated breakup of the Bell System. The FCC periodically solicits private sector contracts for the role of the administrator.

Before the breakup of the Bell System, administration of the North American Numbering Plan was performed by AT&T's Central Services Organization. In 1984, this function was transferred to Bell Communications Research (Bellcore), a company created by the divestiture mandate to perform services for the newly created local exchange carriers. On January 19, 1998, the NANPA function was transferred to the IMS division of Lockheed Martin in Washington, D.C. In 1999, the contract was awarded to Neustar, a company created from Lockheed for this purpose. The contract was renewed in 2004, and again in 2012. On January 1, 2019, Somos assumed the NANPA function with a one-year bridge contract granted by the FCC with the goal of consolidating the NANPA function with the Pooling Administrator and identifying a long-term contractor. On December 1, 2020, Somos secured the $76 million contract for a term of eight years against one other bidder.

== Numbering plan ==
The long-range vision of the architects of the North American Numbering Plan was a system by which telephone subscribers in the United States and Canada could themselves dial and establish a telephone call to any other subscriber without the assistance of switchboard operators. While the dialing of telephone calls by subscribers was common-place in many cities across the continent for local destinations, long-distance telephone calls had to be patched through manually by telephone operators at typically multiple intermediate toll offices using a system known since 1929 as the General Toll Switching Plan. The immediate goal for improvement in the time of call establishment was to provide technology for the originating toll operators to dial calls directly to the destination. This system was known as Operator Toll Dialing.

Operator Toll Dialing required a nationwide telephone numbering plan that unified all local numbering plans into a consistent universal system. Local numbering plans, many of which required only four or five digits to be dialed, or even fewer in small communities, needed to be expanded. The goal was to preserve existing dialing patterns of the local telephone companies as much as possible.

=== Numbering plan areas and central offices ===
The new numbering plan divided the North American continent into regional service areas, termed numbering plan areas (NPAs). The divisions conformed primarily to the jurisdictional boundaries of the U.S. states and the Canadian provinces. Each NPA was identified by a unique three-digit code number, termed the numbering plan area code (NPA code, or short, area code), which was prefixed to the local telephone number when calling from one NPA to another. Calling within the same numbering plan area did not require dialing the area code, a feature today termed seven-digit dialing and today abandoned in numbering plan areas with multiple area codes. though some states or provinces needed to be divided into multiple areas. NPAs were created in accordance with principles deemed to maximize customer understanding and minimize dialing effort, while reducing plant cost.

The telephone exchanges—in the Bell System they were officially termed central offices—became local exchange points in the nationwide system. Each of them was also assigned a three-digit number unique within its NPA. The combination of NPA code and central office code served as a destination routing code for use by operators to reach any central office through the switching network. Due to the numerical structure of the numbering system, each NPA was technically limited to 540 central offices.

Although the limitation to about 500 central offices per numbering plan area required the most populous states to be divided into multiple NPAs, it was not the sole reason to subdivide a state. An important aspect was the existing infrastructure for call routing, which had developed during preceding decades, often independently of state boundaries. The rules of determining areas also attempted to avoid cutting across busy toll traffic routes, so that most toll traffic remained within an NPA, and outgoing traffic in one area would not be tributary to toll offices in an adjacent area. As a result, New York state was initially divided into five areas, the most of any state. Illinois, Ohio, Pennsylvania, and Texas were assigned four NPAs each, and California, Iowa, and Michigan received three. Six states (Indiana, Kansas, Massachusetts, Minnesota, Missouri, Wisconsin) and two provinces (Ontario, Quebec) were divided into two NPAs.

Traditionally, central office switching systems were designed to serve as many as ten thousand subscriber numbers. Thus, subscribers were assigned four-digit line or station numbers. This rounded the total number of digits in a subscriber telephone number to ten: a three-digit area code, a three-digit central office code, and four digits for each line. This fixed format defined the North American Numbering Plan as a closed numbering plan, as opposed to developments in other countries where the number of digits was not fixed.

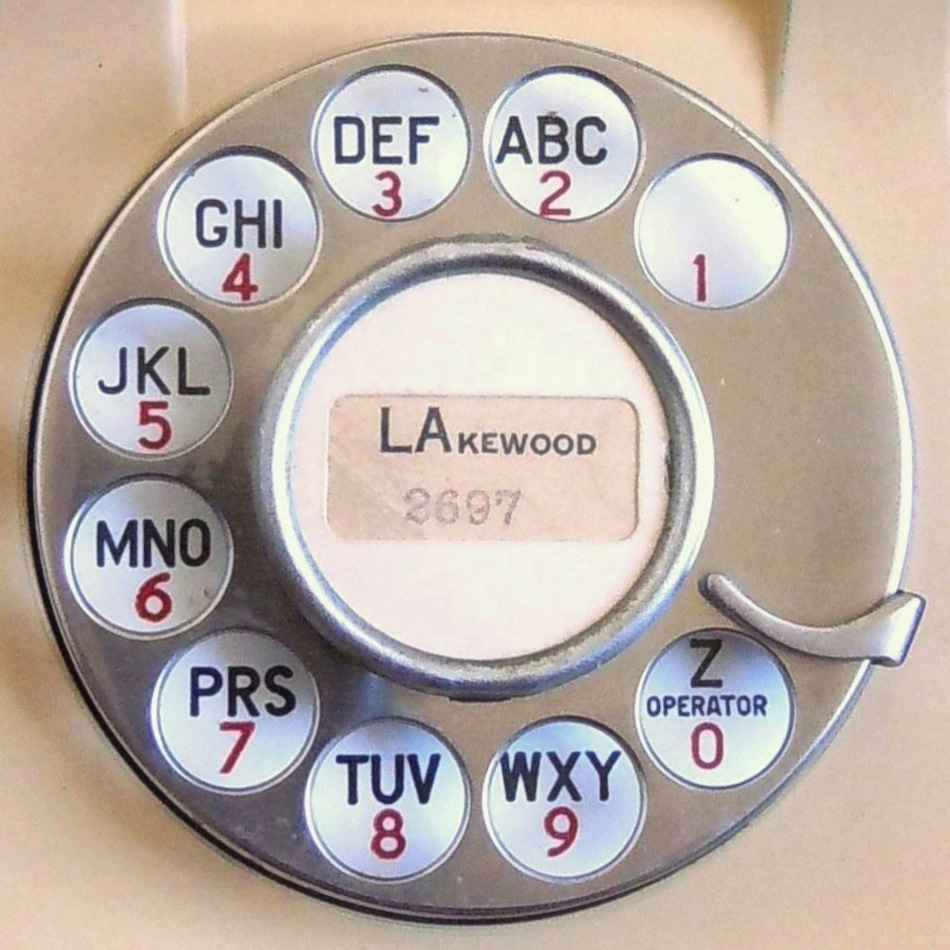
Face of a 1939 rotary telephone dial with the telephone number LA-2697. The dial plate shows the mapping of the alphabet to digits. The telephone number includes the first two letters of Lakewood, New Jersey, as the central office prefix, later converted to LA6 in the new numbering plan.

It was already common practice for decades that the digits 0 and 1 could not appear in the first two digits of the central office codes, because the system of using the first two letters of familiar names for central offices did not assign letters to these digits. The digit 0 was used for operator assistance, and 1, which is essentially a single pulse of loop interruption, was automatically ignored by most switching equipment of the time. Therefore, the 0/1 rule for the area code provided a convenient means to distinguish seven-digit dialing from ten-digit dialing.

The use of telephone exchange names as part of telephone numbers had been a well-established practice, and this was preserved for convenience and expediency in the new network design. The letter-to-digit translations were printed on the face of every rotary dial in the metropolitan areas, according to a scheme designed by W.G. Blauvelt in 1917, that had been used in the Bell System in large metropolitan areas since the early 1920s. The network reorganization standardized this system to using a two-letter and five-digit (2L-5N or 2-5) representation of telephone numbers in most exchanges in North America, or to using an equivalent all-numeric seven-digit numbering plan, as was practiced by some independent telephone companies.

=== Initial numbering system ===
In 1947, AT&T completed the new design for a nationwide toll network that established the original North American area codes. The new numbering plan provided for 152 area codes, each with a capacity to serve as many as 540 central offices. Originally, only eighty-six area codes were assigned. New Jersey received the first NPA code in the new system, area code 201, which also served the 1951 introduction of Direct Distance Dialing by customers. The second area code, 202, was assigned to the District of Columbia. The allocation of area codes was readjusted as early as 1948 before the implementation of the plan commenced. For example, the Indiana numbering plan area 317 was divided, which essentially provided a larger numbering pool in the Indiana suburbs of Chicago (area code 219).

Initially, states divided into multiple numbering plan areas were assigned area codes with the digit 1 in the second position, while areas that comprised entire states or provinces received codes with 0 as the middle digit. This rule was abandoned by the early 1950s, as NPAs with digit 0 in the middle had to be divided, beginning with New Jersey's 201. However, all area codes assigned until 1995 had none other than the digits 0 and 1 in this position.

The eight codes of the form N11 (N=2–9) were reserved as service codes. The easily recognizable codes of the form N00 were available in the numbering plan, but were not initially included in assignments. Additional area code patterns were later assigned for other services; for example, the area codes N10 were implemented for the Teletypewriter Exchange Service (TWX).

=== Dialing procedures ===
The closed numbering plan did not require the subscriber to dial all digits. When dialing a local call or a call within the same numbering plan area, the area code was omitted in seven-digit dialing. In some cases, even fewer digits sufficed for local calling. Ten-digit dialing was only necessary for foreign area calls to subscribers in another state or numbering plan area. Exceptions existed for communities on NPA boundaries, so that uniform local dialing was still possible in historically established communities.

=== All-number calling ===
Partitioning of the NANP prefix space under all-number-calling
000–099	These 200 codes were used as toll center and system codes.		
100–199	These 200 codes were used as toll center and system codes.		
Area codes	Service codes	Area codes	Central office codes
200–210	211	212–219	220–299
300–310	311	312–319	320–399
400–410	411	412–419	420–499
500–510	511	512–519	520–599
600–610	611	612–619	620–699
700–710	711	712–719	720–799
800–810	811	812–819	820–899
900–910	911	912–919	920–999
152 area codes 8 special service codes			640 CO codes

All-number calling was a telephone numbering plan introduced in 1958, that converted telephone numbers with exchange names to a numeric representation of seven digits.

The original plan of 1947 had been projected to be usable beyond the year 2000. However, by the late 1950s it became apparent that it would be outgrown by about 1975. The limitations for the usable leading digits of central office codes, imposed by using common names for central office names, and their leading two characters as guides for customer dialing could no longer be maintained when opening new central offices. By 1962 it was forecast that in 1985 the number of telephones in the nation would equal its population of 280 million and increase to 600 million telephones for 340 million people in 2000. As a result, a few North American telephone administrations, notably New York Telephone Co., first introduced letter combinations that could not be associated with a familiar pronounceable central office name. Finally, they sought the elimination of central office names and letter codes, and introduced all-number calling (ANC).

The all-number calling plan increased the number of permissible central office prefixes from 540 to potentially 800, but the first two digits of the central office code were still restricted to the range 2 to 9, and the eight combinations that ended in 11 were reserved as special calling codes. This expanded the numbering pool for central office codes to 640, and resulted in the partitioning of the prefix space (000—999).

=== Interchangeable central office codes ===
As the numbering plan grew during the 1960s using all-number calling, plan administrators at AT&T identified that by 1973, some of the largest area codes in urban centers might run out of central office prefixes to install more individual access lines. For relief in these cases, they finally eliminated the requirement that the middle digit of the central office code could not be 0 or 1. This resulted in the format of interchangeable central office codes, N X X, where N=2–9 and X=0–9. In 1974, the first cities requiring this action were the cities of Los Angeles with area code 213 and New York with 212. This change also required modification of the local dialing procedures to distinguish local calls from long-distance calls with area codes.

Requiring 1 to be dialed before the full number in some areas provided for area codes of the form N10, such as 210 in the San Antonio, Texas, area and 410 in eastern Maryland. Therefore, someone calling from San Jose, California, to Los Angeles before the change would have dialed 213-555-0123 and after the change 1-213-555-0123, which permitted the use of 213 as an exchange prefix in the San Jose area. The preceding 1 also ideally indicates a toll call; however, this is inconsistent across the NANP because the FCC has left it to the U.S. state public utilities commissions to regulate for traditional landlines, and it has since become moot for mobile phones and digital VoIP services that offer nationwide calling without the extra digit.

=== Interchangeable NPA codes ===
In 1995, the North American Numbering Plan Administrator eliminated the requirement that the middle digit of an area code had to be either 0 or 1, implementing fully interchangeable NPA and central office codes, that had already been anticipated since the 1960s, when interchangeable central office codes were sanctioned.

=== Modern plan ===
The NANP numbering format is summarized in the ten-digit notation NXX NXX-XXXX, where N denotes any of the digits 2–9, and X denotes any digit 0–9.

Component	Name	Number ranges	Notes
NXX often denoted NPA	Numbering plan area code	The first NXX block is the numbering plan area code. When the second and third digits are the same, the code is an easily recognizable code (ERC). ERCs designate special services; e.g., 800 for toll-free service. The NANP is not assigning area codes with 9 as the second digit.	Covers Canada, the United States, parts of the Caribbean Sea, and some Atlantic and Pacific islands.
NXX	Central office code	The second NXX block is the central office code. Permissible numbers exclude easily recognizable codes N11, used for special services.	Also called exchange code
XXXX	Line number	A unique four-digit number for each NPA, from 0000 to 9999	Also called station code

Using 0 or 1 as the first digit of an area code or central office code is invalid; these are trunk prefixes. 9 in the middle position of the NPA is reserved for North American Numbering Plan expansion.

For example, 234 235-5678 is a valid telephone number; with area code 234, central office prefix (exchange) 235, and line number 5678. The number 234 911-5678 is invalid, because the central office code must not be in the form N11. 314 159-2653 is invalid, because the office code must not begin with 1. 123 234-5678 is invalid, because the NPA must not begin with 0 or 1.

Each three-digit area code has a capacity of 7,919,900 telephone numbers (7,918,900 in the United States).

Despite widespread use as fictional telephone numbers in the form NXX 555-XXXX, only line numbers 0100 through 0199 are reserved for this purpose, while 1212 and 4334 are the only assigned uses for directory assistance and other functions.

The country code for all countries participating in the NANP is 1. The prefix digit 1 is also used within the NANP for long-distance dialing.

=== Telephone number formatting ===
NANP telephone numbers are formally rendered as NPA-NXX-XXXX, but (NPA) NXX-XXXX is common, as are others forms of punctuation. The parentheses were used originally to indicate that the area code was not necessary for local dialing. The NPA-part of the number has the formal format NXX, since 1995 identical to the format of central office codes.

The Government of Canada's Translation Bureau also recommends using hyphens between groups; e.g. 250-555-0199.

Under the international formatting rules for telephone numbers, per recommendation E.164 by the International Telecommunication Union (ITU), a NANP number is rendered as +1NPANXXXXXX, without spaces or punctuation, e.g., +12505550199. The plus sign indicates that the country code follows immediately and that the user may have to dial another prefix per the dialing conventions in the country of origin. This selects international network access. The NANP prescribes the prefix 011 for the purpose of dialing destination outside the NANP.

== Non-geographic services ==
The North American Numbering Plan recognizes the need for non-geographic services by designating certain numbering blocks for such purposes. Many of these telephone numbers are selected from the easily recognizable codes (ERCs).

System-wide toll-free calling, for which the receiving party is billed for the call, uses the number range with area codes of the form 8XX.

Area code and central office prefixes for other non-geographic services have the form 5XX-NXX. As of January 2021, the codes 500, 521, 522, 533, 544, 566, 577, 588, 523, 524, 525, and 526 have been designated. These codes are used for fixed or mobile devices, and not assigned to rate centers. As addresses, they may or may not traverse the public switched telephone network (PSTN). Applications include the use as personal 500 numbers.

Some carrier-specific services have used area code 700. In Canada, area code 600 is used for non-geographic applications. Area code 900 has been used for high-toll 900 numbers.

== Cellular mobile services ==
The North American Numbering Plan does not reserve special non-geographic area codes exclusively for cellular phones, as is customary in some other national telephone administrations. Only one regional exception exists in area code 600 in Canada.

For cellular services, telephone numbers in the NANP are allocated within each area code from central offices serving only cellular networks. Calls to them are billed at the same rate as any other call in the same rate center. Consequently, the caller pays pricing model adopted in other countries, in which calls to cellular phones are charged at a higher nationwide rate, but incoming mobile calls are not charged to the mobile user, could not be implemented. Instead, North American cellular telephone subscribers may also be charged for receiving calls (subscriber pays). In the past, this has discouraged mobile users from publishing mobile telephone numbers, but in the 21st century, most users selected bundle pricing plans that included an allotment of minutes expected to be used in the billing period, rather than being charged per call, and most U.S. carriers today offer unlimited calling plans.

Local number portability between fixed and wireless services within a region allows users to switch to mobile service while keeping fix-line telephone numbers.

== Growth ==
Canada and the United States have experienced rapid growth in the number of area codes, particularly between 1990 and 2005. The widespread adoption of fax, modem, and mobile phone communication, as well as the deregulation of local telecommunication services in the United States during the mid-1990s, increased the demand for telephone numbers.

The Federal Communications Commission allowed telecommunication companies to compete with the incumbent local exchange carriers for services, usually by forcing the existing sole service provider to lease infrastructure to other local providers. Because of the original design of the numbering plan and the telephone switching network that assumed only a single provider, number allocations had to be made in 10,000-number blocks even when many fewer numbers were required for each new vendor. Due to the proliferation of service providers in some numbering plan areas, many area codes were threatened with exhaustion of numbering resources. The number blocks of failed service providers often remained unused, as no regulatory mechanism existed to reclaim and reassign these numbers.

Area codes are added by two principal methods, numbering plan area splits and overlays. Splits were implemented by dividing an area into multiple regions, one of which retained the existing area code and the other areas receiving a new code. In an overlay, multiple codes are assigned to the same geographical area, obviating the need for renumbering of existing services. Subtle variations of these techniques have been used as well, such as dedicated overlays, in which the new code is reserved for a particular type of service, such as cellular phones and pagers, and concentrated overlays, in which a part of the area retained a single code while the rest of the region received an overlay code. The only service-specific overlay in the NANP was area code 917 (New York City) when it was first installed; such service-specific area code assignments were later prohibited by the Federal Communications Commission.

Most area codes of the form N10, originally reserved for AT&T's Teletypewriter eXchange (TWX) service, were transferred to Western Union in 1969 and were freed for other use in 1981 after conversion to Telex II service was complete. The last of these, 610, was assigned to Canada, but reassigned in 1992. These new area codes, as well as a few other codes used for routing calls to Mexico, were used for telephone area code splits during the late 1980s and early 1990s, as all other area codes using the original plan had been consumed.

After the remaining valid area codes were used up by expansion, in 1995 the rapid growth in the need for more area codes forced the NANPA to allow the digits 2 through 8 to be used as a middle digit in new area code assignments, with 9 being reserved as a last resort for potential future expansion. At the same time, local exchanges were allowed to use 1 or 0 as a middle digit. The first area codes without a 1 or 0 as the middle digit were area code 334 in Alabama and area code 360 in Washington, which both began service on January 15, 1995. This was followed quickly by area code 520 serving Arizona on March 19, 1995.

By 1995, many cities in the United States and Canada had more than one area code, either from dividing a city into different areas (NPA split) or having more than one code for the same area (NPA overlay). The overlay method requires that the area code must be dialed in all cases, even for local calls, while the split plan may permit seven-digit dialing within the same area. The transition to ten-digit dialing typically starts with a permissive dialing phase, which is widely publicized, during which dialing all ten digits is optional. After a period of several months, mandatory dialing begins, when seven-digit dialing is no longer permissible. Atlanta was the first U.S. city to require mandatory ten-digit dialing throughout the metropolitan area, coinciding roughly with the 1996 Summer Olympics held there. Atlanta was used as the test case not only because of its size, but also because it had the world's largest fiber-optic network at the time, five times larger than that of New York, and it was home to BellSouth (now part of AT&T), then the Southeastern Regional Bell Operating Company, with AT&T's fiber optics manufacturing facility within the city.

=== Growth problems ===
Depending on the techniques used for area code and central office code relief, the effect on telephone users varies. In areas in which overlays were used, this generally avoids the need for converting telephone numbers, so existing directories, business records, letterheads, business cards, advertising, and "speed-dialing" settings can retain the same telephone numbers, while the overlay is used for new number allocations. The primary effect on telephone users is the necessity of remembering and dialing ten-digit numbers when only seven-digit dialing was previously needed.

Dividing numbering plan areas instead of overlaying generally avoids the requirement for mandatory area code dialing within the new regions, but at the expense of having to convert a region to the new code, which necessitates updating records and directories to accommodate the new numbers. A transition period prior to splitting provides a period of "permissive dialing" during which seven-digit dialing is still permitted. Also, many splits involved significant technical issues, considering municipal boundaries and tributary trunking arrangements.

As an example, in 1998, the area code 612, assigned to the Minneapolis – Saint Paul Twin Cities, was divided to create area code 651 for St. Paul and the eastern metropolitan area. The Minnesota Public Utilities Commission mandated that the new boundary exactly follow municipal boundaries, which were distinctly different from telephone exchange boundaries, and that all subscribers keep their seven-digit numbers. These two goals were directly at odds with the reason for the division, namely to provide additional telephone numbers. More than forty exchanges had territory that straddled the new boundary. As a result, prefixes were duplicated in both area codes, which counteracted much of the benefit of the division, with only 200 of 700 prefixes in area 612 transferring entirely to area 651. In less than two years, area code 612 again exhausted its supply of telephone numbers, and necessitated a three-way division in 2000, creating the new area codes 763 and 952. The division again followed political boundaries, rather than rate center boundaries, resulting in additional split prefixes; a few numbers were transferred from 612 to 651 to 763 in less than two years.

=== Number conservation ===
Recognizing that the proliferation of area codes was due largely to the telecom deregulation act and the assignment of telephone numbers in blocks of ten thousand, the FCC instructed NANPA, then administered by Neustar, to alleviate the numbering shortage. As a result, number pooling was piloted in 2001 as a system for allocating telephone numbers to carriers in blocks of 1,000 using the first digit of the line number. The existing design of the switching network made this a considerable technical obstacle. Number pooling was implemented with local number portability, another technical advancement.

The conservation program has been implemented in much of the United States by state regulators. Some cities have also implemented rate center consolidation; fewer rate centers resulted in more efficient use of telephone numbers, as carriers would reserve blocks of 1,000 or 10,000 numbers in each of multiple rate centers in the same area even if they had relatively few clients in the area. A rate center is a geographical area used by a Local Exchange Carrier (LEC) to determine the boundaries for local calling, billing and assigning phone numbers. Typically a call within a rate center is local, while a call from one rate center to another is a long-distance call. Together with aggressive reclamation of unused number blocks from telecom providers, number pooling has reduced the need for additional area codes, so that many previously designated area splits and overlays have been postponed indefinitely.

Canada has not implemented number pooling, so that every competitive local exchange carrier (CLEC) is assigned an entire central office prefix (10,000 numbers).

=== New area codes outside the contiguous United States and Canada ===
Before 1995, all NANP countries and territories outside the contiguous United States, Alaska, Hawaii and Canada shared area code 809, which was created in 1958 to primarily serve the Caribbean islands, notably Puerto Rico and Bermuda at that time.

Each of these island nations has since been recognized as a distinct numbering plan area. For this, numbering plan area 809 was split several times, and now comprises the Dominican Republic exclusively.

Bermuda was assigned area code 441 in 1995.

Puerto Rico was assigned area code 787 in 1996, and was overlaid with area 939.

The U.S. Virgin Islands was assigned area code 340 in 1997.

The Northern Marianas was assigned area code 670 in 1997, before which it used country code 670 for IDDD.

Guam used country code 671 until it was assigned area code 671 in 1997.

American Samoa used country code 684 before October 1, 2004, when it became reachable with area code 684 in the NANP.

Sint Maarten had been using country code 599 until September 30, 2011, but was assigned area code 721, upon NANP membership.

=== Future numbering plan expansion ===
NANP exhaust analyses estimated that the existing numbering system is sufficient beyond 2049, based on the assumptions that a maximum of 674 NPAs continue to be available, and that on average 3,990 central office codes are needed per year.

In case of exhaustion, various plans are discussed for expanding the numbering plan. One option is to add the digit 1 or 0 either at the beginning or at the end of the area code, or prefixing it to the seven-digit subscriber number. This would require eleven-digit dialing even for local calls between any two NANP numbers. Another proposal introduces the digit 9 into the area code in the format x9xx, so that, for example, San Francisco's 415 would become 4915. Other proposals include reallocating blocks of numbers assigned to smaller long-distance carriers or unused reserved services.

== Dialing procedures ==
The structure of the North American Numbering Plan permits implementation of local dial plans in each plan area, depending on requirements. When multiple NPA codes serve an area in an overlay arrangement, ten-digit (10D) dialing is required. Seven-digit (7D) dialing may be permissible in areas with single area codes. Depending on the requirement of toll alerting, it may be necessary to prefix a telephone number with 1. The NANPA publishes dial plan information for individual area codes.

The standard dial plans in most cases:

	Local within area code	Local outside area code	Toll within area code	Toll outside area code
Single code area, with toll alerting	7D or 10D	10D	1+10D	1+10D
Single code area, without toll alerting	7D or 10D	1+10D	10D	1+10D
Overlaid area, with toll alerting	10D	10D	1+10D	1+10D
Overlaid area, without toll alerting	10D	1+10D	10D	1+10D

The number of digits dialed is unrelated to being a local call or a toll call when there is no toll alerting. Allowing 7D local dialing across an area code boundary, which was historically possible but is rare today, required central office code protection, locally if using toll alerting, across the entire area code otherwise, to avoid assignment of the same seven-digit number on both sides. Landlines occasionally require 1+10D where 10D is required, most notably in California.

Most areas permit local calls as 1+10D except for Texas, Georgia, and some jurisdictions in Canada which require that landline callers know which numbers are local and which are toll, dialing 10D for local calls and 1+10D for all toll calls.

In almost all cases, domestic operator-assisted calls are dialed 0+10D.

=== Special numbers and codes ===
Some common special numbers in the North American system:

- 0: operator assistance
- 00: long-distance operator assistance (formerly 2–1–1)
- 011: access code for international direct dialing all destinations outside the NANP
- 01: international access code using operator assistance for all destinations outside the NANP
- 101-xxxx: Carrier access code for selecting an alternative long-distance carrier; xxxx is the carrier identification code (CIC).
- 211: local community information or social services (in some cities)
- 311: city government or non-emergency police matters
- 411: local telephone directory service; some telephone companies provide national directory assistance.
- 511: traffic, road, and tourist information
- 611: telephone line repair service (formerly 4104), wireless operator customer service (formerly 811)
- 711: relay service for customers with hearing or speech disabilities
- 811: local utility location services (United States), non-urgent telehealth/teletriage services in Canada (formerly telephone company business office)
- 911: emergency telephone number—fire department, medical emergency, police
- 988: suicide prevention helpline
- 950-xxxx: Feature group code for access to a carrier from a non-subscriber location. The feature requires the customer dial a 950-xxxx number and enter a calling card number and destination telephone number. It was originally used for locations where 101-xxxx dialing was not possible.
- 958-xxxx (local); 959-xxxx (long distance): Plant test numbers, such as automatic number announcement circuits. It was once common to reserve entire unused exchange prefixes or N11 numbers (4101 was ringback number on many step-by-step switches), but these have largely moved to individual unpublished numbers within the standard 958-xxxx (local) or 959-xxxx (long-distance) plant test exchanges as numbers become scarce.
- 1 (NPA) 555-1212: non-local directory information (Canada and United States)

Vertical service codes are used for special calling features, such as:

- *51 and 1151: a history of unanswered calls on a telephone number, useful for those who are not Caller ID subscribers
- *57 and 1157: used to trace harassing, threatening, abusive, obscene, etc. phone calls, and keep results of trace at phone company
- *66 and 1166: to keep retrying a busy-line (see also Called-party camp-on)
- *67 and 1167: Caller ID Block
- *69 and 1169: Call Return (caller may press '1' to return call after hearing number)
- *70 and 1170: cancel call waiting on a call-by-call basis
- *71 and 1171: three-way calling, which lets a person talk to people in two different locations at the same time
- *74 and 1174: speed dial, which allows someone to quickly dial any of eight frequently called numbers using a one-digit code, from any phone on their line
- *75: allows a total of 30 speed-call numbers with two digits
- *77: activates Anonymous Call Rejection Service
- *82 and 1182: releases Caller ID block on a call-by-call basis
- *87: deactivates Anonymous Call Rejection Service

The four-digit numbers are not implemented in some areas. The star codes (*) are for use on Touch-Tone telephones, whereas the four-digit numbers prefixed 11xx are used on rotary dial telephones which cannot dial the * symbol.

Not all NANP countries use the same codes. For example, the emergency telephone number is not always 911: Trinidad and Tobago and Dominica use 999, as in the United Kingdom. The country of Barbados uses 211 for police force, 311 for fire, and 511 for ambulance, while Jamaica uses 114 for directory assistance, 119 for police force, and 110 for fire and ambulance services.

Despite its early importance as a share of the worldwide telephone system, few of the NANP's codes, such as 911, have been adopted outside the system. Determining that 911 requires unnecessary rotation time on rotary dial telephones, the European Union has adopted its own standardized number of 112, while countries in Asia and the rest of the world use a variety of other two- or three-digit emergency telephone number combinations. The 112 code is gaining prevalence because of its preprogrammed presence in mobile telephones that conform to the European GSM standard. The European Union and many other countries have chosen the International Telecommunication Union's 00 as their international access number instead of 011. However, the toll-free prefix 800 has been adopted widely elsewhere, including as the international toll-free country code. It is often preceded by a 0 rather than a 1 in many countries where 0 is the trunk prefix.

== International dialing ==
While direct dialing of international calls was available in some locations in the United States by the late 1950s, a continental system was introduced as International Direct Distance Dialing (IDDD) for the territories of the North American Numbering Plan in March 1970.

IDDD was implemented through extensive modifications in the switching systems to accommodate the international open numbering plan with seven to twelve digits in the national telephone numbers. Access to the international network is facilitated by the dialing prefix 011, after which the country code and the national telephone number are dialed.

== Number portability ==
The Telecommunications Act of 1996 (47 U.S.C. § 251 (b)(2)) authorizes the Federal Communications Commission (FCC) to require all local exchange carriers (LECs) to offer local number portability. The FCC regulations were enacted on June 27, 1996, with changes to take effect in the one hundred largest Metropolitan Statistical Areas by October 1, 1997, and elsewhere by December 31, 1998.

The FCC directed the North American Numbering Council (NANC) to select one or more private-sector candidates for the local number portability administrator (LNPA) function, in a manner akin to the selection of the North American Numbering Plan Administrator (NANPA).

The toll-free telephone numbers in NPA 800, 888, 877, 866, 855, 844, and 833 have been portable through the RespOrg system since 1993.

== Toll charges ==
Telephone calls between countries and territories of the NANP are not typically charged at domestic rates. For example, most long-distance plans may charge a California subscriber a higher rate for a call to British Columbia than for a call to New York, even though both destinations are within the NANP. Similarly, calls from Bermuda to U.S. destinations incur international rates. Even toll-free numbers may incur charges to callers. This is because many of the island nations implemented a plan of subsidizing the cost of local telephone services by directly charging higher pricing levies on international long-distance services.

Because of these higher fees, scams had taken advantage of customers' unfamiliarity with pricing to call the legacy regional area code 809. Some scams lured customers from the United States and Canada into placing expensive calls to the Caribbean, by representing area code 809 as a regular domestic, low-cost, or toll-free call. The split of 809 (which formerly served all of the Caribbean NANP points) into multiple new area codes created many new, unfamiliar prefixes which could be mistaken for U.S. or Canada domestic area codes but carried high tariffs. In various island nations, premium exchanges such as +1-876-HOT-, +1-876-WET- or +1-876-SEX- (where 876 is Jamaica) became a means to circumvent consumer-protection laws governing area code 900 or similar U.S.-domestic premium numbers.

The occurrence of these scams has been decreasing, with many of the Cable and Wireless service monopolies being opened to competition, hence decreasing rates. Additionally, many Caribbean territories have implemented local government agencies to regulate telecommunications rates of providers.

== Countries and territories ==
Of all states or territories, the U.S. state of California has the largest number of area codes assigned, followed by Texas, Florida and New York, while most countries of the Caribbean use only one. Many Caribbean codes were assigned based on alphabetic abbreviations of the territory name, as indicated in the third column of the following table (Letter code). This follows the traditional letter assignments on telephone dials. For some Pacific islands, the NANPA area code is the same as the country code that was discontinued upon membership in the NANP.

Country/Territory	Area codes	Letter code	Regulator
American Samoa	684*		American Samoa Telecommunications Authority
Anguilla	264	ANG	Public Utilities Commission of Anguilla
Antigua and Barbuda	268	ANT	Telecommunications Division of the Government of Antigua and Barbuda
Bahamas	242	BHA	Utilities Regulation & Competition Authority
Barbados	246	BIM	Telecommunications Unit
Bermuda	441		Regulatory Authority of Bermuda
British Virgin Islands	284	BVI	Telecommunications Regulatory Commission
Canada	204, 226, ... 905		Canadian Numbering Administration Consortium
Cayman Islands	345		Information and Communications Technology Authority
Dominica	767	ROS (Roseau)	Eastern Caribbean Telecommunications Authority
Dominican Republic	809, 829, 849		Instituto Dominicano de las Telecomunicaciones
Grenada	473	GRE	Eastern Caribbean Telecommunications Authority
Guam	671*		Guam Telephone Authority
Jamaica	876, 658		Spectrum Management Authority
Montserrat	664		Montserrat Info-Communications Authority
Northern Mariana Islands	670*		
Puerto Rico	787, 939	PUR	Junta Reglamentadora de Telecomunicaciones de Puerto Rico
Saint Kitts and Nevis	869		National Telecommunications Regulatory Commission
Saint Lucia	758	SLU	National Telecommunications Regulatory Commission
Saint Vincent and the Grenadines	784	SVG	National Telecommunications Regulatory Commission
Sint Maarten	721		Bureau Telecommunications and Post
Trinidad and Tobago	868	TNT	Telecommunications Authority of Trinidad and Tobago
Turks and Caicos Islands	649		Telecommunications Commission
United States	201 ... 989		Federal Communications Commission
United States Virgin Islands	340		Public Services Commission
	* same as former country code		

== Alphabetic mnemonic system ==
Digit	Letters	Letters of the alphabet are mapped to the digits of the telephone dial pad.
2	ABC	Letters of the alphabet are mapped to the digits of the telephone dial pad.
3	DEF	Letters of the alphabet are mapped to the digits of the telephone dial pad.
4	GHI	Letters of the alphabet are mapped to the digits of the telephone dial pad.
5	JKL	Letters of the alphabet are mapped to the digits of the telephone dial pad.
6	MNO	Letters of the alphabet are mapped to the digits of the telephone dial pad.
7	P(Q)RS	Letters of the alphabet are mapped to the digits of the telephone dial pad.
8	TUV	Letters of the alphabet are mapped to the digits of the telephone dial pad.
9	WXY(Z)	Letters of the alphabet are mapped to the digits of the telephone dial pad.

Despite the abandonment of telephone exchange names in telephone numbering plans, many telephone dials and keypads maintain a tradition of alphabetic dialing. Pushbuttons from digit 2 to 9 also displays letters, which is standardized in ISO 9995-8 and, in Europe, E.161. The alphabet is apportioned to the buttons as shown in the table.

The Glenn Miller tune PEnnsylvania 6-5000 refers to telephone number PE6-5000, a number in service at the Hotel Pennsylvania (212 736-5000) in New York City until the hotel's closing in 2020. Similarly, the movie BUtterfield 8 is set in the East Side of Manhattan between roughly 64th and 86th Streets, where the telephone prefixes include 288.

The letter system was phased out beginning in 1960, although it persisted a decade or more later in some places. It was included in Bell of Pennsylvania directories until 1983. Alphabetic phonewords remain as a commercial mnemonic gimmick, particularly for toll-free numbers. For example, dialing 1-800-FLOWERS connects to a flower distributor.

In addition to uses in advertising, alphabetic dialing has occasionally influenced the selection of area codes. For example, when area code 423 (East Tennessee) was split in 1999, the region surrounding Knoxville was assigned area code 865, chosen to represent VOL, for The Volunteer State, the nickname of Tennessee, as well as athletic teams at the University of Tennessee. Similarly, several Caribbean area codes were chosen as an alphabetic version of a country or city name.

== Fictional telephone numbers ==
American television programs and movies often use the central office code 555, or KLamath 5 and KLondike 5 for older periods, in fictitious telephone numbers to prevent disturbing telephone subscribers if anyone dials a telephone number seen or referred to on screen. Not all numbers beginning with 555 are fictional. For example, 555-1212 was the standard free number for directory assistance but is not currently in operation. Only 555-0100 through 555-0199 are reserved for fictional use. Where used, these are often routed to information services; Canadian telephone companies briefly promoted 555-1313 as a pay-per-use "name that number" reverse lookup during the mid-1990s.

Occasionally, valid telephone numbers are used as song titles. One of the earliest examples is the 1940 swing jazz tune "Pennsylvania 6-5000" written by Glenn Miller. The 1962 Motown hit "Beechwood 4-5789" was written by Marvin Gaye for The Marvelettes, while Stax/Volt Records' Wilson Pickett scored a soul music success during the 1960s with the similarly named "634-5789". A more recent example is the 1981 song "867-5309/Jenny" by Tommy Tutone, which was the cause of a large number of prank calls.

== See also ==
- List of North American Numbering Plan area codes
- Numbering Resource Utilization/Forecast Report
