= Telephone numbers in Cuba =

Location
- Country: Cuba
- Continent: the Americas

Access codes
- Country code: 53
- International access: 00
- Long-distance: 0

Telephone numbers in Cuba conform to a fixed format of eight digits. The first one to two are the area code, the remaining digits are the subscriber number.

Calls between locations with different area codes are prefixed with the trunk prefix 0, followed by the area code and telephone number.

The telephone country code is 53.

The international call prefix is harmonized to 00 (fix line formerly used 119 while mobile always used 00).

The mobile numbers format is 5xxx xxxx.

== List of area codes in Cuba ==
LIST OF AREA CODES
Area Code	Province/City
21	Guantánamo Province
22	Santiago de Cuba Province
23	Granma Province
24	Holguín Province
31	Las Tunas Province
32	Camagüey Province
32	Mamanantuabo
33	Ciego de Ávila Province
41	Sancti Spíritus Province
41	Cabaiguán
41	Trinidad
42	Villa Clara Province
42	Condado
42	El Pedrero
42	Santa Clara
42	Topes de Collantes
43	Cienfuegos Province
45	Matanzas Province
45	Cayo Largo del Sur
46	Isla de la Juventud (Isle of Youth)
47	Havana Province
47	Silvio Caro
48	Pinar del Río Province
5	Mobile phones (nationwide)
63	Mobile phones (nationwide)
7	Havana City

The Guantanamo Bay Naval Base, operated by the United States Navy, has an unofficial area code of 99, which is only dialable from within the United States. Dialing 011 53 99 returns a second dial tone, after which the local number at the naval base can be dialed.

== See also ==
- Communications in Cuba

Cuba area codes:
	North: 305/786	
West: Country code 52 in Mexico	53 in Cuba	East: Country code 509 in Haiti
	South: 1 876 in Jamaica	
