= Area code 268 =

Telephone area code in the NANP for Antigua and Barbuda

Coordinates: 17°03′N 61°48′W

Area code 268 is the telephone area code in the North American Numbering Plan (NANP) for Antigua and Barbuda.

The area code was activated on April 1, 1996 by division of numbering plan area 809 which used to comprise all Caribbean countries and Bermuda. A permissive dialing period during which the old and the new area code could be used to call the new NPA was in effect for a period of one year until March 31, 1997. Foreign NPA calls to new telephone numbers in 268 required the new area code.

On the alphanumeric key pad, 268 spells ANT, the first three letters of Antigua.

For local calling in Antigua and Barbuda, seven-digit dialing is in effect. Foreign NPA direct dialed toll calls must be prefixed by the digit 1 (1 + 10 digits) while operator-assisted calls require 0 (0 + 10 digits).

International dialing to other countries outside the NANP requires the international dialing prefix 011 before country code and national telephone number.

Calling to Antigua and Barbuda from NANP countries, such as the United States and Canada, requires dialing the long-distance trunk prefix 1 before the area code and local telephone number, which is the same calling procedure for calling from the country to other NANP countries.

== See also ==
- Area codes in the Caribbean
- List of North American Numbering Plan area codes

Antigua and Barbuda area codes: 268
	North: Atlantic Ocean	
West: 664, 869	268	East: Atlantic Ocean
	South: 664, country code 590 in Guadeloupe	
Montserrat area codes: 664
Saint Kitts and Nevis area codes: 869
