= Permissive dialing =

Phone dialing format

In North America, permissive dialing is the ability to make phone calls in an area subject to a newly introduced area code by using both the new and preexisting dialing methods.

When an area is given a new area code under a split plan, the area's previous area code would no longer be valid for calls in the area, so calls to numbers using the old area code will not work. To alleviate misdialing frustration, the local routing can be set up such that both the old and new area codes will work for the same telephone exchange. During this period, the local numbering authority must not reassign the area's existing exchanges to the remaining area of the old area code, nor vice versa. At the end of the permissive dialing period, the old area code is no longer valid for numbers in the affected area.

Under an overlay plan, permissive dialing refers to the ability to continue to connect calls via 7-digit dialing while also making 10-digit dialing valid. Again, the affected area must not introduce any new ambiguous telephone exchanges. At the end of the period, 10-digit dialing becomes mandatory.
