= Area codes 809, 829, and 849 =

NANP area codes for the Dominican Republic

Coordinates: 19°00′N 70°40′W

Area codes 809, 829, and 849 are telephone area codes in the North American Numbering Plan (NANP) for the Dominican Republic. Like all NANP members, the Dominican Republic uses country code 1, and has similar dialing procedures for dialing the ten-digit national telephone numbers, which consist of the area code, a three-digit central office code, and a four-digit line number. The three area codes of the country are organized as an overlay complex for a single numbering plan area (NPA), comprising the entire country. Thus, ten-digit dialing is mandatory.

== Area code 809 ==
Area code 809 was assigned in 1958 to Puerto Rico. In the 1960s, Bermuda and the Caribbean were added. Cuba, Haiti, the Netherlands Antilles, and the French West Indies decided not to participate in the North American Numbering Plan. Beginning with Bermuda in November 1994, and the Bahamas, Puerto Rico, and Barbados in 1995, several countries in the Caribbean received individual area code assignments from the NANPA, effectively splitting area code 809. By 1999, it was retained only by the Dominican Republic, following the departure of Saint Vincent and the Grenadines from using the area code.

== Area codes 829 and 849 ==
Area code 829 was added for all of the Dominican Republic to form an all-services distributed overlay on January 31, 2005. Earliest central office assignments were possible on October 1, 2005. The relief was needed because of the growth of mobile phone communication in the Dominican Republic, starting in the mid-1990s with prepaid telephone cards, and growing quickly through the early 2000s with the launch of two cellphone carriers, Orange (now Altice) and Centennial (now Viva), in addition to the preexisting CODETEL (now Claro Dominicana) and TRICOM (now Altice Dominicana).

The expansion in telecommunication services continued and further relief for the numbering resources was needed in 2009, when an additional area code was assigned for the numbering plan area, area code 849. Earliest central office code assignments were possibly on July 1, 2009, but did not occur until 2010.

== Calling scam ==
Telephone fraud scams once involved area code 809; it was being used since calling international numbers from the United States is charged at a higher rate than domestic calls. The charge is set jointly by the originating and terminating countries; the foreign country portion of the charge could be very high, and was not regulated. There may have been a resurgence with wireless telephones. The victim received a message on an answering machine to call a number with an 809 area code. However, the number dialed is an international call with a share of the revenue going from the foreign telephone company to the operator of the number. The victim could be put on hold indefinitely, and billed for each minute.

A similar scam emerged due to the prevalence of wireless phones which display callback numbers automatically, known as the "one ring scam". The perpetrator of the scam calls the victim via a robodialer or similar means, sometimes during night time, then hangs up after the call is answered with the hope that the receiver will be curious enough to call back, which incurs an automatic $19.95 international fee, as well as $9.00/min thereafter. Similar scams have been linked to Grenada (area code 473), Antigua (area code 268), Jamaica (area code 876) and the British Virgin Islands (area code 284).

== See also ==
- Area codes in the Caribbean
- List of North American Numbering Plan area codes
- Telecommunications in the Dominican Republic

Dominican Republic area codes: 809/829/849
	North: 649	
West: Country code 509 in Haiti	809/829/849	East: 787/939
	South: Caribbean Sea	
Puerto Rico area codes: 787/939
Turks and Caicos Islands area codes: 649
