= Area codes 617 and 857 =

Area codes in Massachusetts for Boston and vicinity

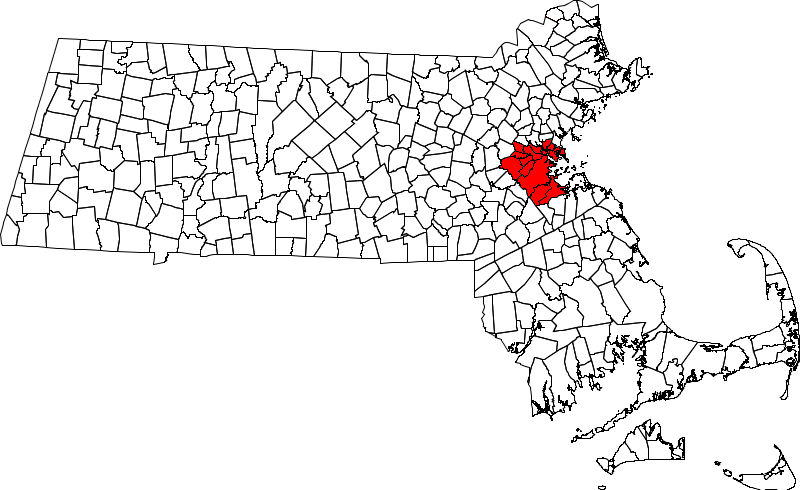
Map showing the region covered by area codes 617 and 857

Map of current Massachusetts area codes (since May 2001)

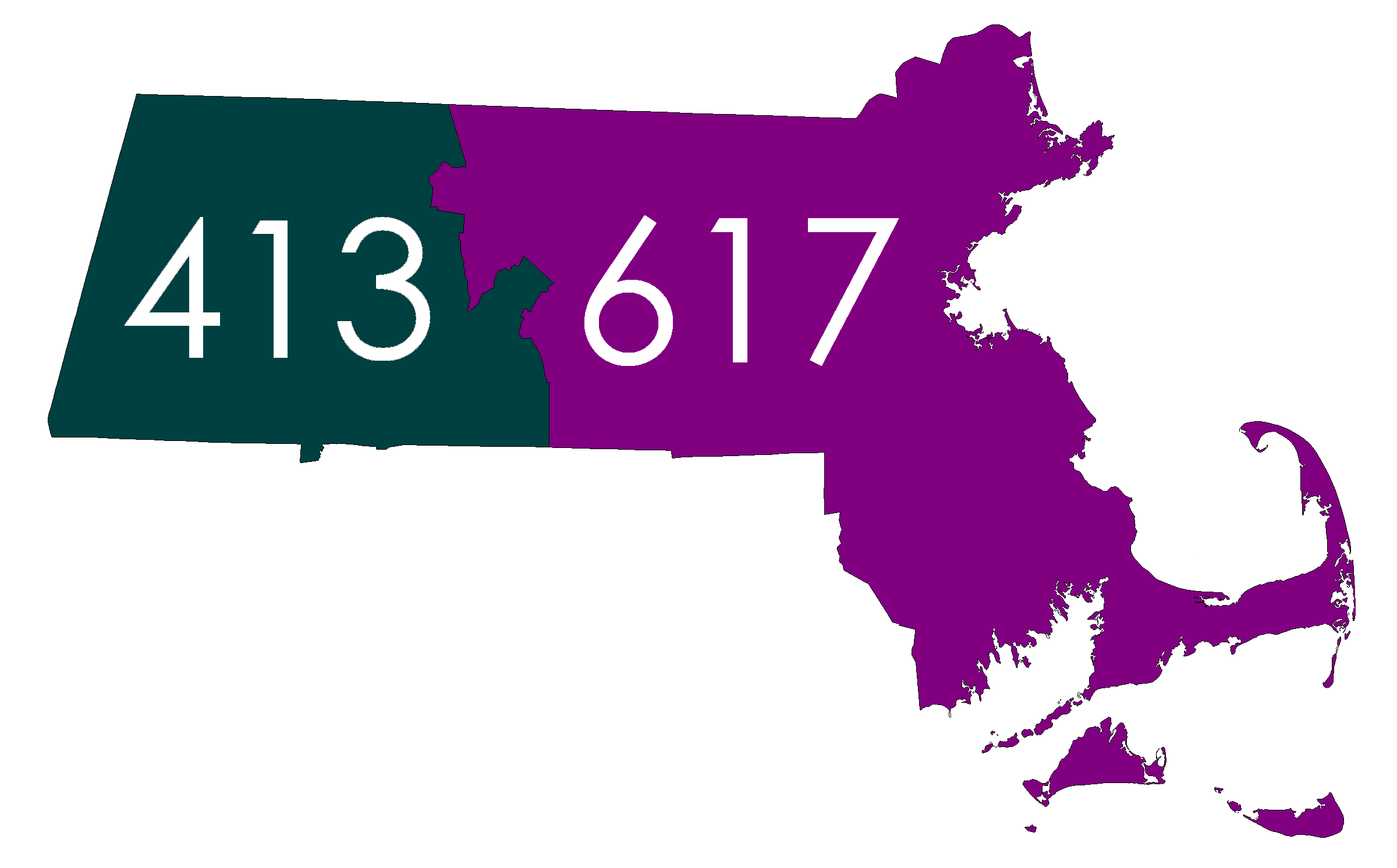
Massachusetts area codes from October 1947 until July 1988

Area codes 617 and 857 are telephone area codes in the North American Numbering Plan (NANP) for the U.S. state of Massachusetts, serving the city of Boston and several surrounding communities such as Brookline, Cambridge, Newton and Quincy. Area code 617 is one of the original North American area codes created in October 1947, when it served the eastern two-thirds of Massachusetts, from roughly the western end of Worcester County to Cape Cod and the South Coast.

== History ==
Massachusetts was the only New England state divided into multiple numbering plan areas (NPAs) when the American Telephone and Telegraph Company (AT&T) devised the first nationwide telephone numbering plan in 1947. Area code 617 was assigned to the more populous eastern portion, stretching from roughly the western end of Worcester County to Cape Cod and the South Coast. The rest of the state, roughly everything from Hardwick westward, was served by area code 413.

In July 1988, most of the western, northern, and southern portions of the old 617 territory, including Worcester County, the Merrimack Valley, the South Coast, and the Cape and Islands, were split off as area code 508. Permissive dialing of 617 continued across eastern Massachusetts until January 1, 1989.

In 1997, the northern, western and southern portions of the new 617 split off as 781, which almost completely surrounds 617. This made 617 largely coextensive with the inner ring of Greater Boston.

This was intended as a long-term solution, but within three years 617 was close to exhaustion once again due to the demand for more phone lines for auxiliary devices (mobile phones, fax machines, pagers, and BBS lines). On May 2, 2001, 857 was overlaid onto 617. Since then, 10-digit local dialing has been mandatory.

Some mobile telephone numbers from the 1990s assigned to communities in the area surrounding 617 (which is now the 781 area code) kept the 617 area code after the split.

Area code 508 was split from 617 on July 16, 1988. Area code 978 subsequently split from 508 on September 1, 1997.

Area code 781 was split from 617 on September 1, 1997.

As of October 2025, the 617/857 NPA is projected to be exhausted by 2059.

== Service area ==
The numbering plan area 617/857 includes portions of the following counties:

- Essex
- Middlesex
- Norfolk
- Suffolk

This includes the following communities:

- Belmont
- Boston
- Brookline
- Cambridge
- Chelsea
- Everett
- Milton
- Newton
- Quincy
- Somerville
- Watertown
- Winthrop

== Central office codes by location ==
The NPA includes central offices with the following prefix format 617-NXX:

- Belmont: 209, 404, 484, 486, 489, 672, 826, 855, 883, 932, 977, 993
- Boston Central: 204, 205, 210, 212, 217, 222, 223, 224, 226, 227, 228, 235, 236, 239, 246, 247, 248, 255, 259, 261, 262, 263, 266, 267, 275, 279, 283, 289, 292, 293, 295, 303, 304, 305, 306, 309, 310, 312, 314, 316, 320, 330, 331, 338, 341, 342, 343, 345, 346, 348, 350, 351, 352, 353, 356, 357, 358, 366, 367, 368, 369, 371, 372, 373, 375, 377, 378, 385, 391, 392, 399, 406, 407, 412, 413, 414, 416, 421, 422, 423, 424, 425, 426, 428, 429, 434, 437, 438, 439, 443, 447, 448, 449, 450, 451, 456, 457, 459, 470, 476, 478, 480, 482, 488, 490, 502, 504, 507, 510, 512, 513, 515, 517, 519, 521, 523, 526, 530, 531, 532, 534, 535, 536, 542, 543, 549, 556, 557, 563, 565, 570, 571, 572, 573, 574, 578, 579, 585, 587, 589, 590, 592, 593, 594, 595, 598, 603, 619, 620, 624, 626, 635, 636, 637, 638, 643, 645, 646, 648, 650, 654, 662, 664, 670, 671, 672, 680, 683, 686, 692, 694, 695, 697, 699, 717, 719, 720, 721, 722, 723, 724, 725, 726, 727, 728, 733, 737, 742, 743, 747, 748, 753, 755, 756, 757, 760, 763, 772, 777, 778, 780, 784, 785, 788, 790, 794, 799, 816, 818, 820, 823, 824, 828, 830, 832, 834, 835, 838, 839, 840, 848, 849, 850, 851, 854, 856, 859, 861, 865, 867, 869, 872, 875, 877, 878, 880, 888, 892, 894, 896, 897, 901, 904, 908, 912, 918, 919, 921, 927, 931, 933, 936, 937, 938, 939, 943, 946, 947, 948, 951, 954, 956, 959, 960, 961, 963, 973, 986, 988, 989, 994
- Brighton: 202, 206, 208, 254, 300, 319, 403, 415, 560, 562, 586, 746, 779, 782, 783, 787, 789, 817, 870, 891, 903, 925, 987
- Brookline: 232, 264, 274, 277, 278, 355, 383, 396, 432, 487, 505, 525, 566, 582, 608, 632, 651, 667, 677, 713, 730, 731, 732, 734, 735, 738, 739, 751, 754, 860, 879, 906, 935, 953, 975, 991, 992
- Cambridge: 201, 216, 218, 225, 229, 230, 233, 234, 245, 250, 251, 252, 253, 256, 258, 280, 290, 299, 301, 308, 324, 335, 339, 349, 354, 359, 374, 384, 386, 388, 395, 397, 401, 417, 430, 441, 444, 452, 453, 460, 465, 468, 475, 491, 492, 493, 494, 495, 496, 497, 498, 499, 500, 503, 520, 528, 540, 547, 550, 551, 575, 576, 577, 583, 588, 599, 613, 621, 642, 647, 649, 661, 665, 674, 679, 682, 685, 693, 703, 710, 714, 715, 758, 761, 768, 798, 800, 802, 803, 806, 812, 821, 836, 844, 852, 858, 864, 866, 868, 871, 873, 876, 899, 902, 909, 914, 940, 945, 949, 955, 976, 995, 998, 999
- Charlestown: 241, 242, 286, 337, 380, 398, 580, 669, 681, 712, 886, 952, 982
- Chelsea: 270, 336, 370, 409, 461, 466, 660, 819, 884, 887, 889, 958
- Dorchester: 265, 282, 287, 288, 297, 326, 379, 436, 446, 474, 506, 514, 533, 704, 707, 740, 822, 825, 905, 929, 979
- East Boston: 271, 418, 455, 561, 567, 568, 569, 634, 716, 874, 895, 913, 970, 981, 997
- Everett: 203, 294, 381, 382, 387, 389, 394, 410, 420, 544, 545, 601, 843, 917, 944
- Hyde Park (includes Readville and parts of Milton): 214, 272, 276, 333, 360, 361, 362, 364, 408, 604, 675, 705, 833, 910, 990
- Jamaica Plain (includes Roslindale and West Roxbury): 323, 325, 327, 344, 363, 390, 435, 469, 477, 522, 524, 553, 676, 942, 971, 983
- Melrose: 957
- Milton (includes Mattapan; see also Hyde Park): 273, 291, 296, 298, 313, 322, 433, 615, 690, 696, 698, 898, 907, 915, 922, 980
- Newton: 213, 215, 219, 243, 244, 332, 340, 431, 454, 467, 473, 485, 527, 546, 552, 558, 559, 564, 581, 584, 597, 609, 610, 614, 618, 630, 631, 641, 644, 655, 656, 658, 659, 663, 678, 762, 775, 795, 796, 831, 853, 862, 881, 882, 885, 893, 916, 928, 964, 965, 969
- Quincy: 221, 237, 249, 302, 317, 328, 347, 376, 405, 471, 472, 479, 481, 483, 509, 537, 639, 653, 657, 687, 689, 691, 706, 729, 745, 750, 769, 770, 773, 774, 786, 793, 801, 804, 829, 837, 842, 845, 847, 890, 934, 984, 985
- Roxbury: 238, 318, 400, 427, 442, 445, 516, 541, 602, 606, 652, 708, 749, 792, 989
- Saugus: 285
- Somerville: 284, 440, 501, 591, 616, 623, 625, 627, 628, 629, 666, 684, 702, 718, 741, 764, 767, 776, 863, 941, 996
- South Boston: 268, 269, 307, 315, 334, 463, 464, 596, 622, 701, 752, 765, 766
- Watertown: 231, 321, 393, 402, 458, 600, 607, 612, 668, 673, 744, 923, 924, 926, 972
- Winthrop: 207, 329, 539, 841, 846

The NPA includes central offices with the following prefix format 857-NXX:

- Belmont: 373, 626
- Boston Central: 201, 204, 205, 207, 221, 222, 238, 241, 254, 257, 272, 277, 284, 288, 294, 319, 334, 350, 355, 362, 366, 383, 413, 445, 449, 453, 472, 488, 654, 753, 869, 891, 931, 991, 996
- Brighton: 498, 540, 559, 919
- Brookline: 218, 225, 234, 245, 307, 364, 576
- Cambridge: 209, 253, 550, 600, 756, 829, 928, 940, 976, 998
- Charlestown: 389, 452, 588
- Chelsea: 776
- Dorchester: 212, 217, 220
- East Boston: 574
- Everett: 363, 888
- Hyde Park: 342, 345
- Jamaica Plain: 203, 547, 719, 728
- Milton: 598
- Newton: 226, 229, 231, 232, 255, 404, 636
- Quincy: 252, 403, 499, 526, 939
- Roxbury: 399, 492, 544
- Somerville: 227, 523, 995, 997
- South Boston: 401, 496, 524
- Watertown: 228
- Winthrop: 201, 816

== N11 codes ==
- 2-1-1: United Way Worldwide (UWW) and the Alliance for Information and Referral Systems (AIRS)
- 3-1-1: Used in Newton, Boston, and elsewhere for 3-1-1 services.
- 4-1-1: directory assistance
- 5-1-1: traffic information or police non-emergency services
- 6-1-1: unused (on landlines)
- 7-1-1: TDD relay (MassRelay) for the deaf
- 8-1-1: underground public utility location (Dig Safe),
- 9-1-1: emergency services

== See also ==
- List of Massachusetts area codes
- List of North American Numbering Plan area codes

Massachusetts area codes: 413, 508/774, 617/857, 781/339, 978/351
	North: 339/781	
West: 339/781	617/857	East: Atlantic Ocean
	South: 339/781	
