= Area codes 781 and 339 =

Area codes for Boston suburbs in Massachusetts

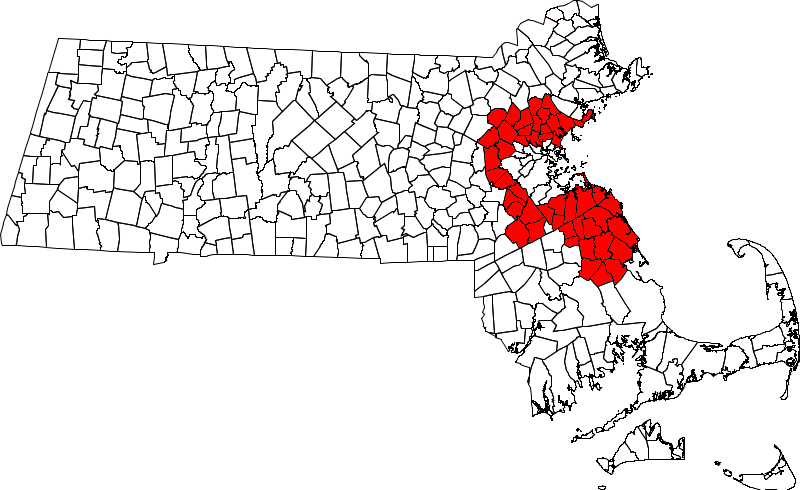
Area codes 781 and 339

Massachusetts' area codes

Area code 781 and 339 are telephone area codes in the North American Numbering Plan for the U.S. state of Massachusetts. The numbering plan area consists of Boston’s inner suburbs along the Route 128 corridor, and some outer suburbs, especially in the South Shore region. Major cities and towns with the area code include Waltham, Woburn, Lynn, Weymouth and Dedham. It was created as in an area code split of area code 617 on September 1, 1997. Use of 781 became mandatory February 1, 1998. Area code 339 is an overlay complex code for the same service area, activated on May 2, 2001. Since then, ten-digit dialing has been mandatory.

Some mobile telephone numbers assigned in the 1990s to rate centers in 781 and 339 kept the 617 area code just on those mobile lines after the split.

As of 2026, both 781 and 339 are well supplied with available numbers, and exhaustion is not projected until 2156.

== Service area ==
The area codes serve most of the South Shore, and the suburbs along Route 128 and surrounding towns. The service area includes portions of the following counties:

- Essex
- Middlesex
- Norfolk
- Plymouth
- Suffolk

Communities:

- Abington
- Arlington
- Bedford
- Braintree
- Burlington
- Canton
- Cohasset
- Dedham
- Duxbury
- Halifax
- Hanover
- Hanson
- Hingham
- Holbrook
- Hull
- Kingston
- Lexington
- Lincoln
- Lynn
- Lynnfield
- Malden
- Marblehead
- Marshfield
- Medford
- Melrose
- Nahant
- Needham
- Norwell
- Norwood
- Pembroke
- Plympton
- Randolph
- Reading
- Revere
- Rockland
- Saugus
- Scituate
- Sharon
- Stoneham
- Stoughton
- Swampscott
- Wakefield
- Waltham
- Wellesley
- Weston
- Westwood
- Weymouth
- Whitman
- Winchester
- Woburn

=== 781-NXX ===
- Arlington (includes part of Medford): 316, 443, 483, 488, 574, 583, 641, 643, 645, 646, 648, 777, 819, 844, 859
- Braintree: 228, 267, 303, 348, 353, 356, 380, 394, 428, 510, 519, 535, 602, 654, 664, 794, 796, 817, 843, 848, 849, 884, 917, 926, 930, 952, 964
- Burlington: 202, 203, 221, 229, 238, 262, 265, 270, 272, 273, 313, 328, 345, 359, 362, 365, 387, 418, 425, 442, 494, 505, 552, 564, 565, 601, 653, 685, 730, 743, 744, 750, 757, 791, 825, 852, 892, 896, 993, 998
- Canton: 232, 298, 302, 332, 363, 364, 401, 415, 562, 571, 575, 615, 633, 713, 737, 739, 746, 770, 774, 821, 828, 830, 989
- Cohasset: 210, 236, 383, 527, 923
- Dedham (includes part of Westwood): 223, 251, 320, 326, 329, 355, 366, 375, 381, 407, 410, 441, 459, 461, 467, 471, 492, 493, 613, 636, 686, 690, 708, 742, 751, 752, 801, 915
- Hingham: 374, 385, 556, 630, 706, 735, 740, 741, 749, 783, 804, 836, 875, 903, 908, 919
- Hull: 214, 242, 773, 925
- Lexington (includes Bedford): 226, 230, 240, 266, 271, 274, 275, 276, 280, 301, 323, 325, 354, 357, 372, 377, 382, 402, 430, 456, 457, 458, 482, 515, 532, 533, 538, 541, 553, 597, 652, 669, 671, 674, 676, 687, 698, 734, 748, 761, 766, 778, 841, 845, 860, 861, 862, 863, 869, 879, 918, 945, 958, 981, 999
- Lincoln: 259
- Lynn: 215, 244, 248, 254, 268, 309, 346, 477, 479, 581, 584, 586, 592, 593, 594, 595, 596, 598, 599, 632, 691, 710, 715, 718, 731, 771, 780, 842, 910, 913
- Malden: 288, 321, 322, 324, 333, 338, 388, 397, 399, 420, 480, 502, 605, 627, 661, 667, 851, 870, 873, 905, 912
- Medford: 219, 306, 350, 391, 393, 395, 396, 475, 498, 518, 526, 539, 628, 655, 658, 723, 827, 866, 874, 957, 960
- Melrose: 432, 462, 517, 590, 606, 620, 662, 665, 712, 720, 979
- Needham: 247, 292, 343, 400, 429, 433, 444, 449, 453, 455, 465, 474, 495, 514, 540, 559, 644, 657, 707, 719, 726, 727, 898, 965, 972
- Norwood (includes part of Westwood): 255, 369, 278, 349, 352, 414, 440, 501, 551, 603, 619, 634, 680, 688, 702, 725, 762, 769, 856, 881, 929, 948, 949, 956
- Randolph (includes Holbrook): 300, 308, 390, 437, 473, 506, 510, 607, 767, 785, 815, 824, 885, 888, 961, 963, 986
- Reading: 205, 282, 315, 439, 509, 649, 670, 673, 677, 758, 764, 765, 779, 872, 909, 942, 944
- Revere: 241, 284, 286, 289, 426, 485, 549, 560, 629, 656, 808, 823, 853, 858, 922, 951, 953,
- Saugus: 231, 233, 558
- Scituate: 545
- Stoneham: 279, 435, 438, 454, 481, 507, 568, 572, 799, 832, 835, 850, 954, 984
- Wakefield: 213, 224, 245, 246, 258, 295, 360, 451, 486, 548, 557, 567, 587, 621, 683, 716, 876, 914, 928, 968
- Waltham (includes part of Weston): 207, 208, 209, 212, 216, 249, 250, 256, 290, 296, 299, 314, 317, 330, 370, 373, 386, 392, 398, 409, 419, 434, 464, 466, 472, 478, 487, 513, 516, 522, 529, 530, 543, 547, 577, 609, 612, 614, 622, 642, 647, 663, 668, 672, 678, 684, 693, 697, 699, 736, 768, 775, 786, 788, 790, 795, 810, 833, 839, 864, 890, 891, 893, 894, 895, 899, 902, 906, 907, 916, 966, 996
- Wellesley (includes part of Weston): 235, 237, 239, 263, 283, 304, 371, 416, 431, 446, 489, 591, 694, 705, 772, 943, 992, 997
- Weymouth: 277, 331, 335, 337, 340, 413, 534, 624, 626, 637, 682, 724, 789, 803, 812, 901, 927, 974, 985
- Winchester: 218, 358, 368, 369, 389, 570, 589, 604, 625, 717, 721, 722, 729, 756, 760, 838, 971, 977, 983
- Woburn: 281, 287, 305, 367, 376, 404, 405, 460, 491, 496, 497, 503, 504, 528, 537, 569, 608, 638, 640, 696, 704, 759, 782, 787, 865, 883, 897, 904, 932, 933, 935, 937, 938, 939, 962, 670, 994, 995

=== 339-NXX ===
- Arlington: 368, 707
- Braintree: 235
- Bryantville: 244, 933
- Burlington: 234
- Cambridge: 550, 940, 976
- Canton: 237, 502
- Cohasset: 337
- Dedham: 204
- Hingham: 200, 236
- Kingston: 309, 832
- Lexington: 223, 970
- Lincoln: 333
- Lowell: 920
- Lynn: 440, 883
- Malden: 224
- Marshfield: 793
- Medford:221, 545, 674
- Melrose: 293
- Needham: 225
- Norwell: 613
- Norwood: 206
- Randolph: 987
- Revere: 226, 532
- Rockland: 469, 788
- Saugus: 600
- Scituate: 526
- Sharon: 230, 364
- Wakefield: 203, 219
- Waltham: 222, 814
- Wellesley: 686
- Weymouth: 355, 499
- Woburn: 227, 298, 645, 927

== N11 codes ==
- 2-1-1: United Way Worldwide (UWW) and the Alliance for Information and Referral Systems (AIRS)
- 3-1-1: unused
- 4-1-1: directory assistance
- 5-1-1: traffic information or police non-emergency services (treated as calling to the 617 area code)
- 6-1-1: unused
- 7-1-1: TDD relay (MassRelay) for the deaf
- 8-1-1: underground public utility location (Dig Safe),
- 9-1-1: emergency services

== See also ==
- List of area codes in Massachusetts
- List of North American Numbering Plan area codes

Massachusetts area codes: 413, 508/774, 617/857, 781/339, 978/351
	North: 978/351	
West: 413	339/781 surrounds 617/857	East: 617/857, Atlantic Ocean
	South: 508/774	
