= Abbreviated dialing =

Use of a short digit sequence to reach specific telephone numbers

Abbreviated dialing is the use of a very short digit sequence to reach specific telephone numbers, such as those of public services. The purpose of such numbers is to be universal, short, and easy to remember. Typically they are two or three digits.

Carriers refer to the shortened number sequences as abbreviated dialing codes (ADCs). Unlike SMS short codes, they are generally not automatically synchronized across carriers. ADCs are provisioned separately for mobile networks versus landline networks.

== Examples ==
The most commonly known examples are emergency telephone numbers such as 9-9-9, 1-1-2 and 9-1-1. Other services may also be available through abbreviated dialing numbers, such as the other of the eight N11 codes of the North American Numbering Plan (NANP) besides 9-1-1. State highway departments in recent years have used abbreviated dialing codes to allow drivers to obtain information about road conditions or to reach the state highway patrol. Examples are *55 in Missouri and Oklahoma, or *FHP which connects to the Florida Highway Patrol. In December 2019, the Federal Communications Commission proposed making 9-8-8 a national number in the United States for the National Suicide Prevention Lifeline. On July 16, 2022 it was officially implemented as the toll-free, nationwide telephone number for the hotline.

== Security ==
Privileged group-number, system-number, and enhanced-number lists provide access to numbers that typically would be restricted.

== Similar concepts ==
For text messaging, the technical equivalent is a short code; however, these are rented by their private users rather than being universal and for public services.

Vertical service codes may also be considered as abbreviated dialing, though these are often prefixed by the special touch-tone characters * and # (or often 11 for pulse dialing) instead of using only numerals. Most are used to access calling features rather than a called party, and some are specific to each telephone company. Some are used only locally or regionally (such as *FHP (*347) to reach the Florida Highway Patrol); other codes as short as one numeral (like *1) are used to report breaking news or traffic to the newsrooms of local news radio or TV stations.

A mobile dial code (MDC) is a phone number, typically preceded by a * or #, that allows the request and receipt of information directly to a mobile phone. MDCs are also known in carrier terminology as "abbreviated dialing codes" (ADCs). Mobile dial codes are dialed just like a regular telephone number. The caller can be presented with any one of a variety of responses that an advertiser defines: a voice or IVR call, a text message, a video or audio clip, a mobile coupon, game or an application.

These types of dialing options can be used for a number of things. "Pound two-fifty" (#250) is an MDC commonly used in radio & TV advertising. Callers are able to dial #250 for a voice-activated, hands-free connection to a business. Callers are prompted to say a keyword or key-phrase, which corresponds to an advertiser (e.g., "Food For The Poor" causes a connection to that non-profit charity). #250 is the only MDC that is functional on all significant mobile carriers in the US and Canada, including Verizon, AT&T, T-Mobile, Sprint, U.S. Cellular, cSpire and several smaller regional carriers (in Canada, on Rogers, Bell Mobility, Telus, Freedom Mobile, Eastlink, Sasktel, Fido, and Videotron).

== Specific number usage by region ==
Usage for each number varies by location. Below are specific numbers, as used in various regions.

this section provides sub-sections for various regions. the sub-sections are not necessarily hierarchical; a region comprising a large country can be equal in level to a region comprising one or more continents.

=== Multi-continent usages ===
- 999 is an official emergency telephone number in a number of countries which allows the caller to contact emergency services for emergency assistance. Countries and territories using the number include Bahrain, Bangladesh, Botswana, Cook Island, Eswatini, Ghana, Guernsey, Hong Kong, the Republic of Ireland, the Isle of Man, Jersey, Kenya, Macau, Malaysia, Mauritius, Niue, Poland, Qatar, Sudan, Saudi Arabia, Singapore, Trinidad and Tobago, Seychelles, Uganda, the United Arab Emirates, the United Kingdom, and Zimbabwe.

=== North America ===
- 911, or nine-one-one, is the emergency telephone number in United States of America, Canada, and Mexico.

=== United States ===
In the United States, an N11 code (pronounced Enn-one-one) is a three-digit dialing code used in abbreviated dialing in the North American Numbering Plan (NANP). These dialing codes provide access to special local services, such as 911 for emergency services, which is a facility mandated by law in the United States. The FCC specified how the N11 codes of 211, 311, 511, 711 and 811 codes would be used for various types of public information under NANP.

N11-numbers provide access to special services. For example,

This US road sign reminds drivers and passengers about 5-1-1 service.

- 211: Community services and information
- 311: Municipal government services, non-emergency number
- 411: Directory assistance
- 511: Traffic information or police non-emergency services
- 611: Telephone company (telco) customer service and repair
- 711: TDD and Relay Services for the deaf and hard of hearing
- 811: Underground public utility location (United States); non-emergency health information and services (Canada)
- 911: Emergency services (police, fire, ambulance and rescue services)

411 and 611 are commonly used in the United States, but not officially assigned by the Federal Communications Commission.

The designation for special use in the NANP prevents their use as area codes and central office prefixes, eliminating about 8 million telephone numbers from assignment.

Usage of numbers for major cities, in the United States.

- New York State/New York City:
  - 211: Information hotline for New York State.
  - 311: Information hotline for New York City.
  - 511: information on transportation services and conditions throughout New York State
  - 811: information on underground features and layout, for any construction projects that require digging in New York State.

=== Europe ===
- Police 101 is the police single non-emergency telephone number in the United Kingdom which automatically connects the caller to their local police force (with the option to select a different police force if required), in a similar manner to the 999 emergency telephone number. Calls are now free. Before 2019 there was a charge of 15p per call.
- 105 is the single non-emergency telephone number in the United Kingdom, it connects to the caller's local electricity distribution network operator, and is primarily established for reporting power cuts. Calls are free.
- NHS 111 is a free-to-call single non-emergency telephone number medical helpline provided by the National Health Service (NHS) in the United Kingdom operating in England, Scotland, and parts of Wales.
- 112, or one-one-two, is the emergency telephone number across the European Union, United Kingdom (where it works parallel to 999), and other non-EU countries, and on Global System for Mobile Communications (GSM) mobile telephone networks across the world. Alternate emergency telephone number for tourists in Macau.
- 119 in the United Kingdom is the single number for contacting the National Health Service (NHS) for Coronavirus (COVID-19) testing. Calls are free.
- 159 is the single number run by Action Fraud Stop Scams in the United Kingdom which connects callers, via menu options, directly to their bank's official anti-fraud department, in order to report scams or fraud. Calls are charged the same as a "geographic rate" call.
- 999, or nine-nine-nine, is the common emergency telephone number used to contact one of the four main emergency control centres (ECC) in United Kingdom (where it works parallel to 112); also an emergency telephone number in several non-EU countries. Former emergency telephone number in Ireland and Poland.

=== Asia and Oceania ===
- 000 Emergency is the emergency telephone number in Australia.
- 106 Text Emergency Call is the Australian national textphone/TTY emergency telephone number.
- 111 is the emergency telephone number in New Zealand.
- 105 New Zealand, is used to contact the police in general non-emergency situations.

== See also ==
- Crisis hotline
- Enhanced 911
- Federal Communications Commission (FCC) (United States)
- In case of emergency
- Next Generation 9-1-1
- Social services
- Speed dial

=== Specific number data ===
- List of emergency telephone numbers
