= Area code 603 =

Telephone area code for all of New Hampshire

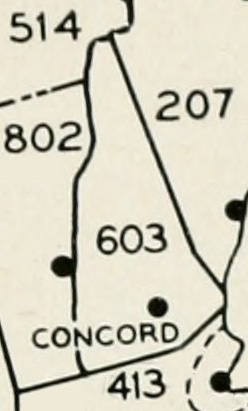
Numbering plan area 603 in a 1956 map, comprising the entire state

Area code 603 is the sole telephone area code in the North American Numbering Plan (NANP) for the U.S. state of New Hampshire. It was assigned as one of the 86 original North American area codes in October 1947.

In 2011, area code 603 was projected to near exhaustion and a second area code for New Hampshire was expected to be activated by 2013 in a statewide overlay complex. As a result of changes in allocation policies, including number pooling, and a reclamation of a large block of previously allocated telephone numbers, the exhaustion time frame has been moved to at least 2032.

Prior to October 2021, area code 603 had telephone numbers assigned for the central office code 988. In 2020, 988 was designated nationwide as a dialing code for the Suicide and Crisis Lifeline, which created a conflict for exchanges that permit seven-digit dialing. This area code was therefore scheduled to transition to ten-digit dialing by October 24, 2021.

New Hampshire area codes: 603
	North: 819/468/873	
West: 802	603	East: 207
	South: 351/978, 413	
Massachusetts area codes: 413, 508/774, 617/857, 781/339, 978/351
Maine area codes: 207
Quebec area codes: 367/418/581, 354/450/579, 263/438/514, 468/819/873
Vermont area codes: 802
