= 30330 =

30330 may refer to:

- 30330, a ZIP code for Atlanta, Georgia, United States
- 30330, a postal code for Gard, France
- 30330, an SMS Short code linked to the Joe Biden 2020 presidential campaign and Kamala Harris 2024 presidential campaign
- 30330 Tiffanysun, a main-belt asteroid
