= StarStar Mobile =

Phone communications company

StarStar Mobile operates the National StarStar Registry in the United States, leasing StarStar Numbers (Mobile Dial Codes) through wireless carriers including AT&T, Verizon, Sprint and T-Mobile. The company was founded as a subsidiary of Virtual Hold Technology in 2016, when Virtual Hold Technology acquired Zoove and its StarStar services from Mblox.

StarStar numbers allow consumers with mobile phones to connect directly to a business and receive an SMS message which enables them to choose whether they want to be connected to a person, to be directed to a mobile website or to download a mobile application. An example of a StarStar number is **TAXI (**8294) which allows a mobile phone user to connect to a local taxi company.

StarStar Mobile was co-founded by Steve Doumar in 2015 with $80mm. He acted as the president of the company for many years.
