= Mobile dial code =

Short phone numbers offered by some carriers

A mobile dial code (MDC) is a grouping of 3 to 10 numbers following either a "#", "##", "*" or "**" used to create a short, easy-to-remember phone number. Historically, MDCs were used for repair-related purposes by landline and wireless carriers. More recently, MDCs have been made available for commercial use. MDCs are dialed just like a regular telephone number. Businesses can send automatic responses upon contact, such as by text message.

== Usage ==
MDCs are used by wireless carriers for the following purposes:

- customer convenience, offering quick access to customer service or bill payment
- diagnosing problems with and making repairs, such as unlocking or locking cell phones
- commercial use by third parties as a vanity telephone number

For an MDC to be used as a vanity telephone number, all major wireless carriers must provision it to their users. Suppose the business needs to use the MDC in more than one State. In that case, accommodations can be made for one MDC to be shared by multiple users on a state-by-state, or even local area by local area basis, through advanced routing technology, called geo-routing. Inbound calls to MDCs can either be automatically routed based on the caller's area code or by asking the caller to type out or speak their zip code into the phone.

=== Commercial use ===
MDCs may be easier to remember than full phone numbers and thus easier to brand. Therefore, they may be helpful in lead generation businesses that generate and then sell leads to potential businesses or other companies.

== Similar technology ==
USSD (Unstructured Supplementary Service Data) codes are mobile dial codes that can be used for communicating with the service provider's computers (i.e. for WAP browsing, prepaid callback service, mobile-money services, location-based content services, menu-based information services, and as part of configuring the phone on the network).

Abbreviated dialing codes involve a similar technology that supports only voice calls.

2D bar codes involve using a graphic that must be photographed or scanned by a mobile phone camera before presenting the caller with a response.

== Worldwide ==
=== United States ===
In the United States, each wireless network controls how the MDCs will be used. As such, when wireless customers call an MDC, their call is routed to the end user selected by their carrier.

== See also ==
- Abbreviated dialing
- Vertical service code, consisting of an asterisk followed by a two-digit number.
- Short code, for sending SMS and MMS text messages
- Comparison of user features of messaging platforms
