= N11 code =

Abbreviated dialing code for local special services in the North American Numbering Plan

This U.S. road sign alerts highway users to the availability of 9-1-1 service.

An N11 code (pronounced Enn-one-one) is a three-digit dialing code used in abbreviated dialing in the North American Numbering Plan (NANP). The mnemonic N stands for any of the digits 2 through 9 and thus the syntax expands to 211, 311, 411, 511, 611, 711, 811, and 911. These dialing codes provide access to special local services, such as 911 for emergency services, which is a facility mandated by law in the United States. The Federal Communications Commission (FCC) in CC Docket 92-105, specified how the N11 codes of 211, 311, 511, 711 and 811 codes would be used for various types of public information under NANP.

== Services ==
N11-numbers provide access to special services that are delivered locally within a certain service area. For example,

This US road sign reminds drivers and passengers about 5-1-1 service.

- 211: Community services and information
- 311: Municipal government services, non-emergency number
- 411: Directory assistance
- 511: Traffic information or police non-emergency services
- 611: Telephone company (telco) customer service and repair
- 711: TDD and Relay Services for the deaf and hard of hearing
- 811: Underground public utility location (United States); non-emergency health information and services (Canada)
- 911: Emergency services (police, fire, ambulance and rescue services)

411 and 611 are commonly used in the United States, but not officially assigned by the Federal Communications Commission.

The designation for special use in the NANP prevents their use as area codes and central office prefixes, eliminating about 8 million telephone numbers from assignment.

The assigned use of each N11 code may vary for the various countries, US states, and Canadian provinces of the NANP, but 911 is mandated in the United States and Canada, 711 and 911 access is mandated by law in the United States, even within private networks (PBX, enterprise and cellular systems).

411 and 611 are supported by the service provider for the calling phone, but not all carriers provide these services. 411 and 611 (formerly 811) are typically blocked within enterprise or private branch exchange (PBX) systems, including cellular telephone service purchased for an enterprise system, since 411 calls generally incur a fee and the service is now readily accessible by other means, and 611 services are managed by the enterprise in which the phone resides.

Other community services are provided through 211, but only if a nonprofit organization, such as United Way of America, or the local government operates it locally. Likewise, local, state or provincial government may, but do not uniformly, operate traffic information using 511. 811 was made mandatory in the United States in 2007; however, it has not been universally implemented. 711 is funded through the TRS Fund, which telephone companies are mandated to maintain to provide Relay Services for the Deaf and Hearing Impaired.

== 011 ==
Within the NANP, a leading digit of 0 or 1 indicates special dialing arrangements. 1 is the toll-dialing prefix, or trunk prefix. 011 is the international calling prefix, dialed before a country code to call internationally.

== See also ==
- 988 Suicide & Crisis Lifeline – Suicide prevention hotline in the United States & Canada
- Single non-emergency number – Freephone services in the European Union
