= Area code 413 =

Telephone area code in western Massachusetts, United States

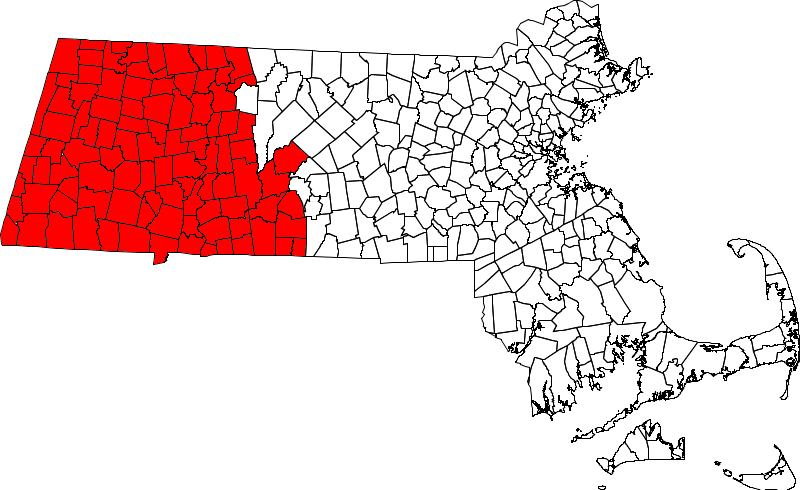
Numbering plan area of area code 413 (red)

Massachusetts numbering plan areas and area codes

Area code 413 is a telephone area code in the North American Numbering Plan (NANP) for the western third of Massachusetts. It is the largest numbering plan area in the Commonwealth, and extends from the New York state line eastward into Worcester County (only the towns of Hardwick and Warren), while excluding the Franklin County towns of Orange, New Salem, Warwick, and Wendell, which use the overlay of area codes 978 and 351. The most-populous city of area code 413 is Springfield. 413 also includes Great Barrington, Greenfield, North Adams, Northampton and Pittsfield. The 413 numbering plan area constitutes local access and transport area (LATA) 126.

With area code 617, the area code is one of the two original area codes of 1947 in Massachusetts.

== History ==
When the American Telephone and Telegraph Company (AT&T) published the first nationwide telephone numbering plan for Operator Toll Dialing in 1947, Massachusetts was divided into two numbering plan areas (NPAs), the only state in New England to be split between multiple NPAs. The western part of the state received area code 413, while the eastern two-thirds (including Boston and Worcester) were assigned 617. The dividing line between the two NPAs ran through far western Worcester County. Everything west of the tributary exchange areas of the control switching points in Orange, Petersham, Barre, Oakham, North Brookfield, Sturbridge and Southbridge comprised the 413 NPA, so that the border between the two NPAs was formed by the eastern borders of the 413 exchange areas of Northfield, Millers Falls, Montague, Amherst, Gilbertville, Belchertown, Ware, Warren and Brimfield.

As western Massachusetts is not as densely populated as the eastern portion, 413 remained the region's sole area code even as the eastern portion of the state went from one area code to four from 1988 to 1997 (since augmented by an additional four overlays). As a result, 413 is also one of the few original area codes (not counting those that cover an entire state) that have not been split or overlaid.

Despite the proliferation of telecommunication services, particularly in and around Springfield, central office codes in 413 are not threatened with exhaustion until 2048, per 2026 projections by the North American Numbering Plan Administrator. It is also the only area in the state where seven-digit dialing is permitted.

In a preliminary version of the numbering plan of c. 1946, area code 413 had been allotted for use in Pennsylvania.

== Service area ==
=== Cities and towns ===
- Adams
- Agawam
- Alford
- Amherst
- Ashfield
- Becket
- Belchertown
- Bernardston
- Blandford
- Brimfield
- Buckland
- Charlemont
- Cheshire
- Chester
- Chesterfield
- Chicopee
- Clarksburg
- Colrain
- Conway
- Cummington
- Dalton
- Deerfield
- Easthampton
- East Longmeadow
- Egremont
- Erving
- Florida
- Gill
- Goshen
- Granby
- Granville
- Great Barrington
- Greenfield
- Hadley
- Hampden
- Hancock
- Hardwick
- Hatfield
- Hawley
- Heath
- Hinsdale
- Holland
- Holyoke
- Huntington
- Lanesborough
- Lee
- Lenox
- Leverett
- Leyden
- Longmeadow
- Ludlow
- Middlefield
- Monroe
- Monson
- Montague
- Monterey
- Montgomery
- Mount Washington
- New Ashford
- New Marlborough
- Northampton
- Northfield
- Otis
- Palmer
- Pelham
- Peru
- Pittsfield
- Plainfield
- Richmond
- Rowe
- Russell
- Sandisfield
- Savoy
- Sheffield
- Shelburne
- Shutesbury
- South Hadley
- Southampton
- Southwick
- Springfield
- Sunderland
- Stockbridge
- Tyringham
- Tolland
- Wales
- Ware
- Warren
- Washington
- Westfield
- Westhampton
- West Springfield
- West Stockbridge
- Whately
- Wilbraham
- Williamsburg
- Williamstown
- Windsor
- Worthington

=== Counties ===
- Berkshire County
- Hampden County
- Hampshire County
- Franklin County (except for Orange, New Salem, Warwick, and Wendell)
- Worcester County (Hardwick and Warren only)

== See also ==
- List of area codes in Massachusetts
- List of North American Numbering Plan area codes

Massachusetts area codes: 413, 508/774, 617/857, 781/339, 978/351
	North: 603, 802	
West: 518/838	413	East: 351/978, 508/774
	South: 860/959	
Connecticut area codes: 203/475, 860/959
New York area codes: 212/332/646, 315/680, 363/516, 518/838, 585, 607, 631/934, 624/716, 347/718/929, 329/845, 914, 917
New Hampshire area codes: 603
Vermont area codes: 802
