= 311 (telephone number) =

Special phone number for municipal services

- 3-1-1

Background
- N11 code: 311
- Service type: Non-emergency municipal services hotline
- Introduced: 1997
- Regulatory authority: Federal Communications Commission

Service details
- Purpose: Provides access to local government information, services, and non-emergency police assistance
- Managed by: Municipal and county governments
- Availability: Available in many cities and counties
- Area restrictions: Implementation varies by locality
- Access method: Dial 3-1-1 within participating jurisdictions; some areas require a local area code
- Call cost: Usually free; standard call rates may apply in some regions
- Status: Active

Implementation
- First deployment: Baltimore, Maryland
- Nationwide coverage: Adopted by hundreds of municipalities since the late 1990s
- Technical standard: North American Numbering Plan

Related services
- 211, 411, 511, 711, 811, 911

A video of New York City's mayor Zohran Mamdani answering 311 calls

311 is a special telephone number supported in many communities in the United States and Canada. The number provides access to non-emergency municipal services. The number format follows the N11 code for a group of short, special-purpose local numbers as designated in the North American Numbering Plan.

The telephone number 3-1-1 creates a central hub for local subscribers to access a variety of city services. It is intended, in part, to divert routine inquiries and non-urgent community concerns from the 9-1-1 number which is reserved for emergency service. A promotional website for 3-1-1 in Akron described the distinction as follows: "Burning building? Call 911. Burning question? Call 311."

Many cities also accept comments through online interfaces. An Open 311 application programming interface is also available for these services.

== History ==
The first use of 3-1-1 for informational services was in Baltimore, Maryland, where the service commenced on 2 October 1996. 3-1-1 is intended to connect callers to a call center that can be the same as the 9-1-1 call center, but with 3-1-1 calls assigned secondary priority, answered only when no 9-1-1 calls are waiting. This is intended to improve efficiency so that true emergency callers are answered quickly with highest priority.

The largest 3-1-1 operation in North America was implemented in New York City in March 2003.

The Canadian Radio-television and Telecommunications Commission (CRTC) reserved 3-1-1 for non-emergency municipal services throughout Canada on 5 November 2004. The first Canadian 3-1-1 service opened in Calgary, Alberta on 18 May 2005.

Historically, the 311 code was used by some telephone companies for testing. In Alberta, 311 was the automatic number announcement circuit (ANAC) until 1 April 2005 when it was changed to 958–6111 to provide for the 3-1-1 service.

Since 2020, National 311 Day has been held on March 11 (3/11) to spread awareness about 3-1-1 systems.

In 2026, Maryland became the first state to enact a statewide 311 system.

== Operation ==
3-1-1 service is generally implemented at the local level; in some cities, it is also used for various municipal calls.

Examples of calls intended for 3-1-1 include:

- abandoned vehicles in roadway
- code and housing violations
- dead animal removal
- debris in roadway
- graffiti removal
- illegal burning
- non-working streetlamps, parking meters, traffic lights
- noise complaints
- parking law enforcement
- parks and recreation concerns
- potholes, sinkholes and utility holes in streets
- public safety concerns
- rat or rodent infestation
- reporting stolen vehicles

=== Open 311 ===
On March 3, 2010, the Federal Chief Information Officer of the United States, Vivek Kundra, announced the creation of a uniform Open 311 application programming interface for these services. In 2009 at TechCrunch 50, CitySourced first launched "Mobile 311" to allow citizens to submit issues directly from a smartphone to their local government. The online 311 service SeeClickFix, which partners with news organizations to promote reported issues, is available across the United States but does not connect to municipalities with their permission or knowledge except in a few select cases.

Open 311 is used internationally, for example by FixMyStreet in the United Kingdom.

=== Cell-phone access ===
311 services works with some cellular phone providers, and about one-third of all 311 calls in the USA originate from cell phones as of 2022, while cell-phone carriers gradually add the service to their networks.

== Availability ==
=== United States ===
3-1-1 is available in several major American cities, including:

- Akron, Ohio
- Albany, Georgia
- Albuquerque, New Mexico
- Anaheim, California
- Andover, Massachusetts
- Atlanta, Georgia
- Austin, Texas
- Baltimore, Maryland
- Baton Rouge, Louisiana
- Beaumont, Texas
- Berkeley, California
- Birmingham, Alabama
- Boston, Massachusetts
- Buffalo, New York
- Cary, North Carolina
- Charlotte, North Carolina
- Chattanooga, Tennessee
- Chicago, Illinois
- Cincinnati, Ohio
- Cleveland, Ohio (soft launch, available only in a limited number of departments)
- Columbus, Georgia
- Columbus, Ohio
- Dallas, Texas
- Danbury, Connecticut
- Denton, Texas
- Denver, Colorado
- Detroit, Michigan
- El Paso, Texas
- Elgin, Illinois
- Evanston, Illinois
- Fort Wayne, Indiana
- Fresno, California
- Grand Rapids, Michigan
- Greensboro, North Carolina
- Gulfport, Mississippi
- Hampton, Virginia
- Hartford, Connecticut
- Haverhill, Massachusetts
- Houston, Texas
- Huntington, West Virginia
- Jacksonville, Florida
- Kansas City, Missouri
- Knoxville, Tennessee
- La Crosse, Wisconsin
- Laredo, Texas
- Las Vegas, Nevada
- Lexington, Kentucky
- Little Rock, Arkansas
- Los Angeles, California
- Louisville, Kentucky
- Memphis, Tennessee
- Miami, Florida
- Milwaukee, Wisconsin
- Minneapolis, Minnesota
- Mobile, Alabama
- Montgomery, Alabama
- Nashville, Tennessee
- New Orleans, Louisiana
- New York City, New York
- Newport News, Virginia
- Newton, Massachusetts
- Oakland, California
- Orlando, Florida
- Oxford, Alabama
- Pensacola, Florida
- Philadelphia, Pennsylvania
- Pittsburgh, Pennsylvania
- Portland, Oregon
- Providence, Rhode Island
- Provo, Utah
- Redmond, Washington
- Richmond, Virginia
- Riverside, California
- Rochester, New York
- Sacramento, California
- San Antonio, Texas
- San Francisco, California
- San Jose, California
- Santa Monica, California
- Somerville, Massachusetts
- South Bend, Indiana
- Spokane, Washington
- Springfield, Massachusetts
- Tampa, Florida
- Tempe, Arizona
- Terre Haute, Indiana
- Troy, Alabama
- Tulsa, Oklahoma
- Tuscaloosa, Alabama
- Virginia Beach, Virginia
- Washington, D.C.
- Waterbury, Connecticut
- Winston-Salem, North Carolina
- Yonkers, New York

3-1-1 is also available in an increasing number of US counties and smaller towns, for example:

- Baldwin County, Alabama
- Brookhaven, New York
- Broward County, Florida
- Prince George's County, Maryland
- Columbia County, Georgia
- Mecklenburg County, North Carolina (via City of Charlotte)
- Montgomery County, Maryland
- North Hempstead, New York
- Orange County, California
- Orange County, Florida
- Pinal County, Arizona
- Washoe County, Nevada
- Westchester County, New York

=== Canada ===
The service is available in the following communities (with starting date):

- Durham Region, Ontario (1 December 2022)
- Calgary, Alberta (18 May 2005)
- Cranbrook, British Columbia (5 July 2017)
- Lethbridge, Alberta (11 March 2019)
- Edmonton, Alberta (16 December 2008)
- Fort St. John, British Columbia (14 November 2006)
- Gatineau, Quebec (22 June 2005)
- Grande Prairie, Alberta (1 March 2021)
- Greater Sudbury, Ontario (12 February 2007)
- Halifax, Nova Scotia (15 November 2012)
- Halton Region, Ontario (18 March 2008)
- Lévis, Quebec (17 March 2021)
- Laval, Quebec (3 October 2007)
- Longueuil, Quebec (10 March 2013)
- Montreal, Quebec (mid-December 2007)
- Ottawa, Ontario (19 September 2005)
- Prince George, British Columbia (18 January 2019)
- Quebec City, Quebec (2010)
- Peel Region, Ontario (5 October 2009)
- St. John's, Newfoundland and Labrador (27 June 2006)
- Toronto, Ontario (24 September 2009)
- Trois-Rivières, Quebec (7 May 2018)
- Vancouver, British Columbia (15 June 2009)
- Waterloo Region, Ontario (December 2012)
- Windsor, Ontario (22 August 2005)
- Winnipeg, Manitoba (16 January 2009)

=== Latin America ===
Places such as Panama, Puerto Rico, Costa Rica and the Dominican Republic have implemented nationwide 311 centers.

In the Republic of Panama, the Centro de Atencion Ciudadana (3-1-1) is legally responsible for the centralized reception of citizen complaints, requests, suggestions and consultations to government agencies or municipalities. It operates 24 hours a day, seven days a week and 365 days a year, receiving over a million citizen contacts on an annual basis through its toll-free line, self-service portal, mobile application and social media accounts.

== Equivalents in other countries ==
=== Finland ===
On a yearly basis, the dispatchers in Finland's 112 service receive some 800,000 non-urgent calls. In order to curb this problem, which ties up precious resources, a committee proposes that Finland launch a new telephone number—116 115—for such calls. Calls to this number would also be free of charge.

=== Germany ===
In Germany, comparable service numbers are called "Behördenrufnummer" or "Bürgertelefon" (citizen's hotlines). The best-known implementation of a citizen's hotline is "Einheitliche Behördenrufnummer" (Single government telephone number) 115. Starting from May 2019 it was founded a single access number to municipal, regional, and federal administrations. It is available nationwide, though not in every municipality.

=== Sweden ===
Sweden has introduced a system with which less-urgent callers can call 114 14 to get connected to the local police station. Depending on current load and situation, however, the call could potentially be connected to any station in Sweden. Calls to this number are charged according to the same rates as any other national calls.

=== United Kingdom ===
In all parts of the United Kingdom, the non-emergency number for contacting the police is 101.

=== Thailand ===
Thailand does not use an N11-style number, but it does have a widely used digital non‑emergency reporting system: Traffy Fondue, operated by the National Electronics and Computer Technology Center (NECTEC) under the National Science and Technology Development Agency (NSTDA). It allows residents to submit complaints such as damaged infrastructure, waste management problems, or local service issues through a mobile application, LINE chatbot, or web portal. Reports are automatically routed to the responsible local authority, and the platform provides public tracking of case resolution.

== Usage ==
The cost of city services in Baltimore has been dramatically reduced by the combination of the 3-1-1 service and CitiStat.

While Baltimore was the first city to use 311 as a police non-emergency number, in January 1999, Chicago initiated the first comprehensive 3-1-1 system, by providing information and tracking city services from intake to resolution, in addition to taking non-emergency police calls. When the new service was launched, information regarding all city services, service requests, assistance in reaching various city departments and public offices, and a variety of information ranging from information about the city's Blue Bag recycling program to special events schedules could be obtained by calling 3-1-1. This also supplanted the need to remember or find the number (312) 744–5000, which, until then, acted as a switching station for reaching various city departments and employees, as well as Chicago Police non-emergency (dialing this number today directs you to a 3-1-1 center operator from any area code). Since its launch, Chicago 3-1-1 has won numerous national awards, including the Innovations in American Government Award from the Ash Institute for Democratic Governance and Innovation at Harvard University's John F. Kennedy School of Government in 2003. In addition to providing seamless delivery of city services to residents, the call center serves as a backup to the city's 911 call center.

In Orange County, Florida, in 2004, while the 3-1-1 system was still being piloted, three hurricanes struck Central Florida. The unusual occurrence damaged homes and businesses throughout the Orlando area. The pilot program used a seven-digit number (initially 836–3111) and it was this number that received the demands for post-hurricane services. This experience tested and proved the value of the program and Orange County immediately activated the 3-1-1 number for governmental customer service.

In New York City, 3-1-1 is used by city officials as one of several sources of measurement and information about the performance of city services. Important dates in the history of New York's 3-1-1 service include December 20, 2005, when it received its record high of 240,000 calls, due to the first day of the 2005 New York City transit strike, and June 20, 2007, when it received its 50 millionth call.

In San Francisco, 3-1-1 is the number for the City and County of San Francisco. As in New York City, it provides information about city services, such as transit information. San Francisco 3-1-1 was implemented in 2007 shortly after the launch of the T Third Street Muni light rail line. However, it has come under substantial criticism of late because the 3-1-1 system charges the financially strapped Muni system $1.96 for every Muni-related phone call. Some have criticized Mayor Gavin Newsom for stealing Muni funds into the 3-1-1 system.

In the city of Charlotte and Mecklenburg County, North Carolina, 3-1-1 is also used to find lost pets, get answers to questions about taxes, complain about needed roadway maintenance, get information about flood conditions, make non-emergency police reports, and other government services.

The City of Philadelphia implemented its 3-1-1 service in 2008. The Philly311 Contact Center provides information to citizens and places service requests for departments across the city. These requests include but are not limited to: missed rubbish collection, graffiti removal, License & Inspection inquiries, and pothole repairs. Philly311 receives over one million calls each year despite not being in service on a 24/7 basis, as is the case in other cities.

== See also ==
- 9-1-1: Emergency telephone number
- Civil defense by country
- National Emergency Technology Guard
