= Area codes 978 and 351 =

Telephone area codes for central and northeastern Massachusetts

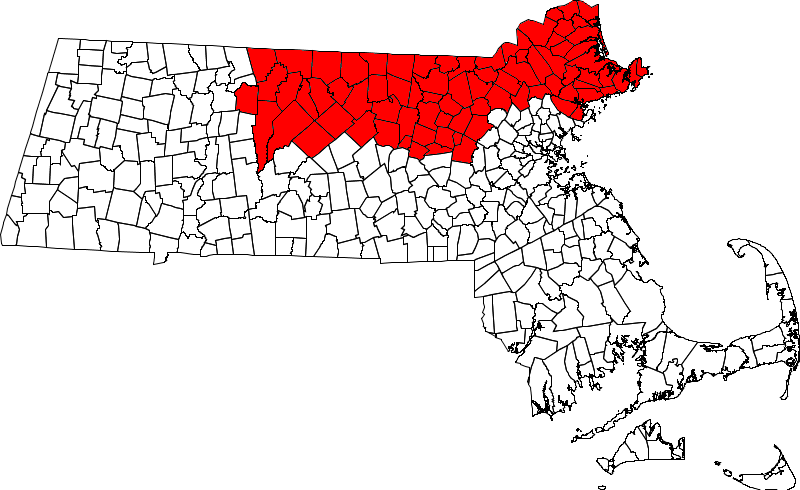
The region of area codes 978 and 351

Massachusetts area codes since May 2001

Area codes 978 and 351 are telephone area codes in the North American Numbering Plan (NANP) for north central and most of northeastern Massachusetts.

Area code 978 was created in an area code split of area code 508 on September 1, 1997. A permissive dialing period ended on February 1, 1998. Area code 351 was added to the same service area as an overlay on May 2, 2001. Since then, ten-digit dialing has been mandatory for all telephone calls.

Prior to the July 1988 split to create 508, the numbering plan area was served by area code 617, along with the rest of the eastern two-thirds of the state. Some mobile telephone numbers from the 1990s assigned to rate centers in 978 and 351 kept the 508 area code on those mobile lines after the split.

The numbering plan area is part of local access and transport area (LATA) 128.

As of 2026, both area codes are currently well supplied with numbers, and exhaustion is not projected until the 2150s.

== Service area ==
The service area extends in north central and northeastern Massachusetts, and comprises the following towns and cities.

- Acton
- Ashburnham
- Ashby
- Andover
- Amesbury
- Athol
- Ayer
- Berlin
- Beverly
- Billerica
- Bolton
- Boxborough
- Burlington
- Carlisle
- Chelmsford
- Clinton
- Concord
- Danvers
- Dracut
- Dunstable
- Fitchburg
- Gardner
- Georgetown
- Gloucester
- Groton
- Groveland
- Harvard
- Haverhill
- Hudson
- Ipswich
- Lancaster
- Lawrence
- Leominster
- Littleton
- Lowell
- Maynard
- Methuen
- Merrimac
- Middleton
- Newburyport
- North Reading
- Peabody
- Pepperell
- Princeton
- Rowley
- Salem
- Salisbury
- Shirley
- Sterling
- Stow
- Still River
- Sudbury
- Tewksbury
- Tyngsboro
- Westford
- Westminster
- Wilmington
- Winchendon

== See also ==
- List of Massachusetts area codes
- List of North American Numbering Plan area codes

Massachusetts area codes: 413, 508/774, 617/857, 781/339, 978/351
| | North: 603 | |
| West: 413 | 351/978 | East: 339/781, Atlantic Ocean |
| | South: 508/774, 339/781 | |
New Hampshire area codes: 603
