= List of Massachusetts area codes =

Numbering plan areas and area codes since May 2001

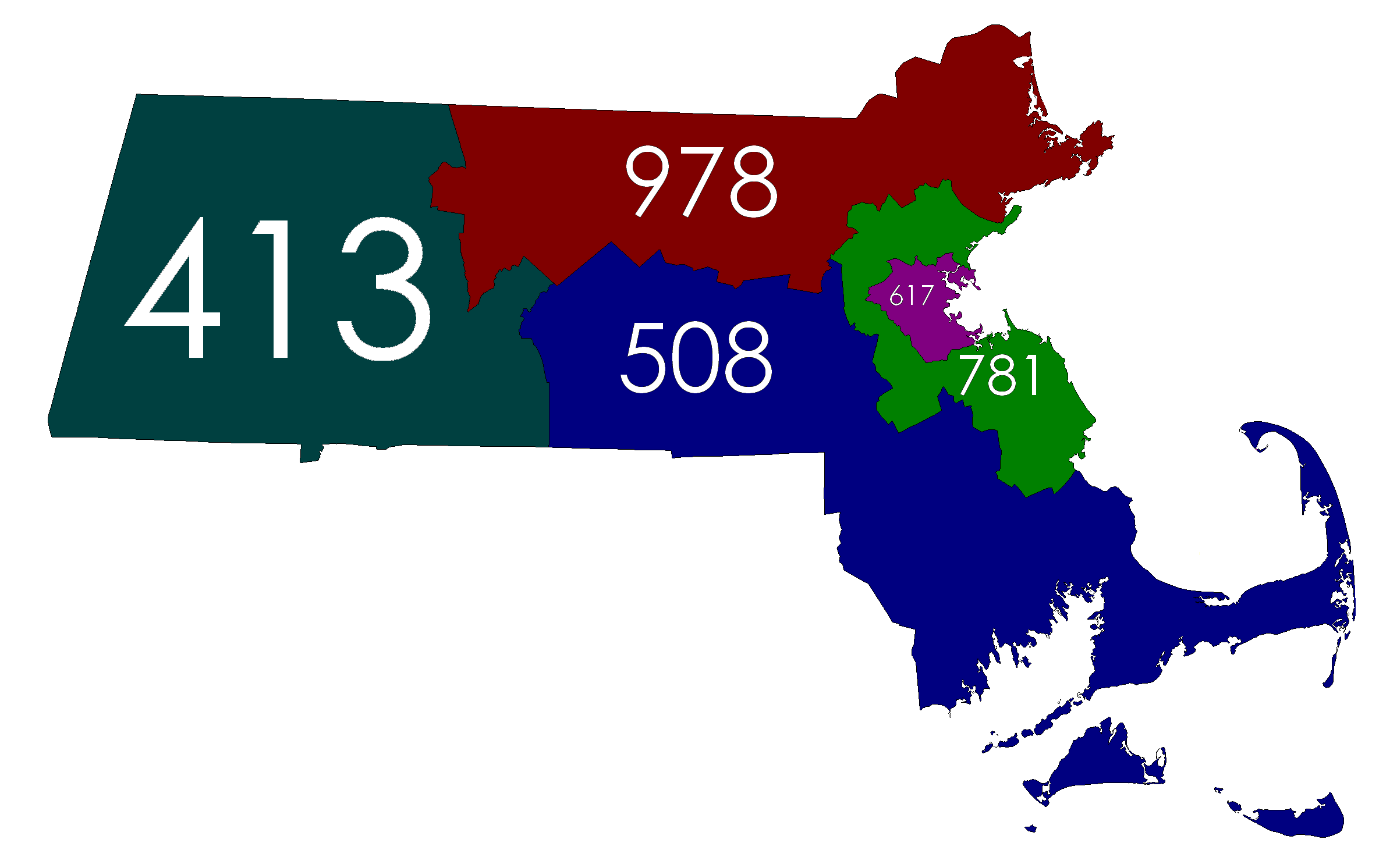
September 1997 – May 2001

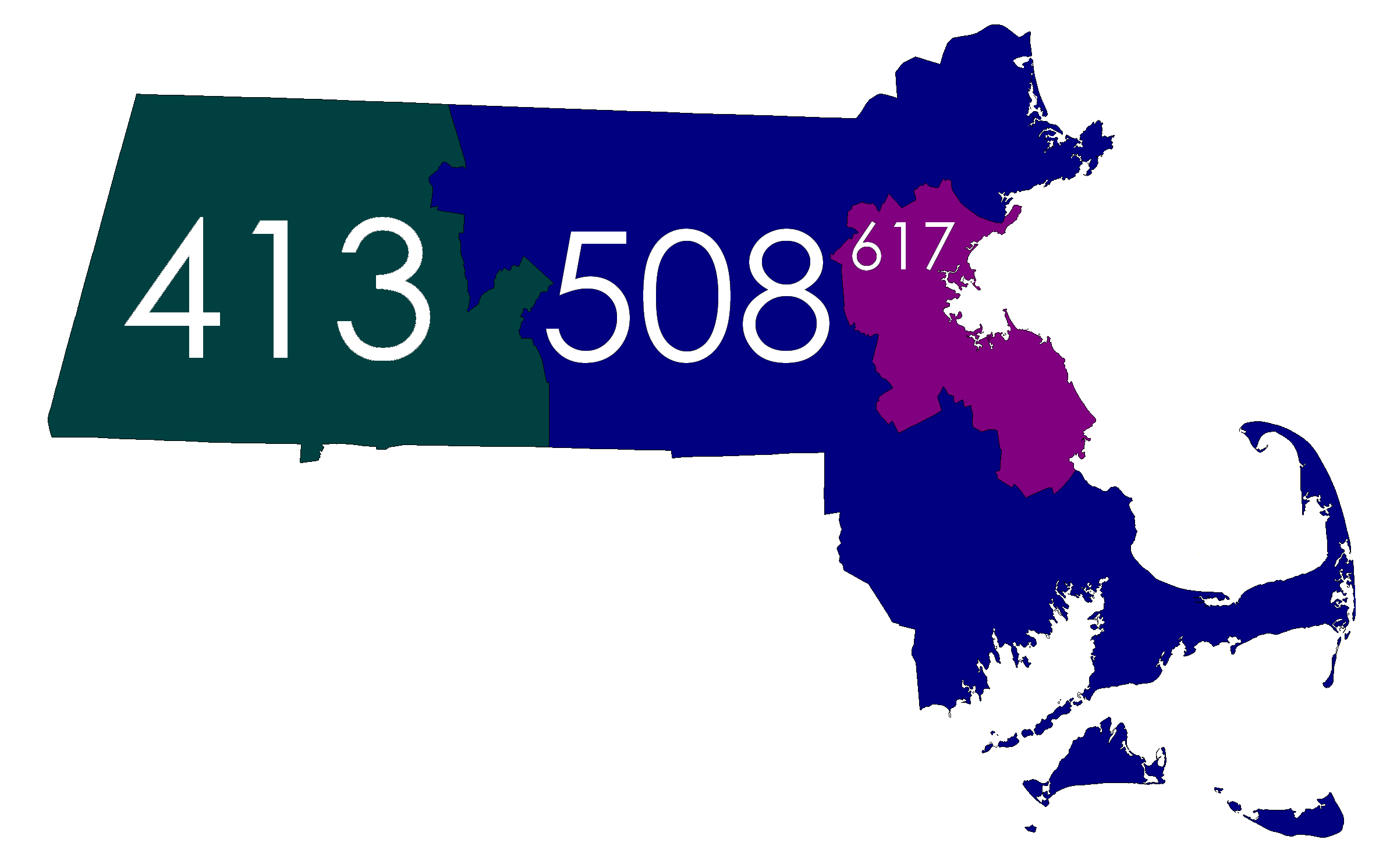
July 1988 – September 1997

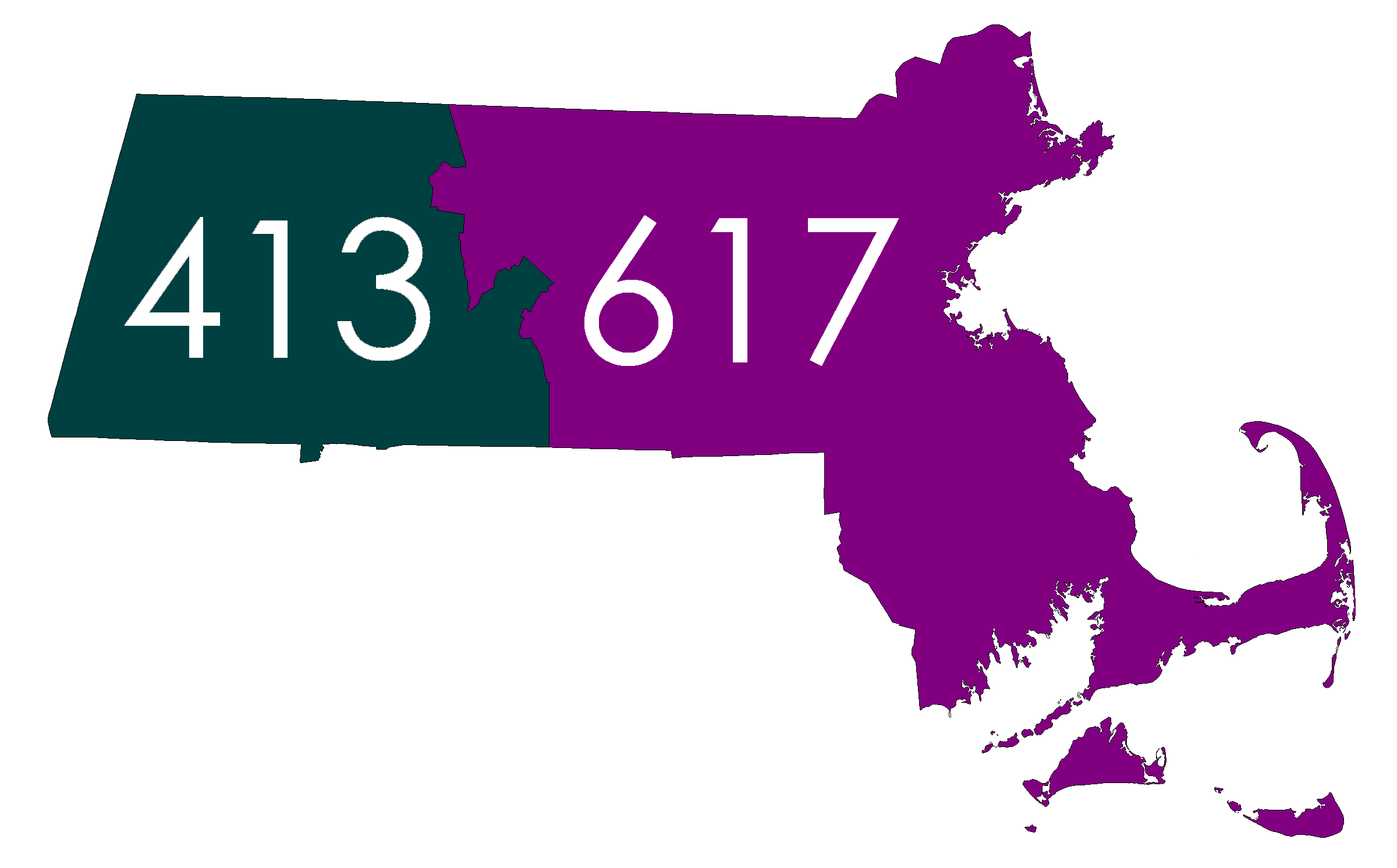
October 1947 – July 1988

Massachusetts is divided into five distinct numbering plan areas (NPAs) in the North American Numbering Plan (NANP), which are served by nine area codes, organized as four overlay complexes and a single-area code NPA.

Eastern Massachusetts has area codes 339, 351, 508, 617, 774, 781, 857, and 978. Western Massachusetts has area code 413.

The numbering plan areas are organized into two local access and transport areas (LATAs): 126 comprises the western part, and 128 covers the central and eastern parts.

Area code	Year created	Parent NPA	Overlay	Numbering plan area
413	1947	–	–	Western Massachusetts: Amherst, Greenfield, Holyoke, North Adams, Pittsfield, Springfield
617	1947	–	617/857	Boston and surrounding communities such as Brookline, Cambridge, Newton, and Quincy.
857	2001	617	617/857	Boston and surrounding communities such as Brookline, Cambridge, Newton, and Quincy.
781	1997	617	339/781	Greater Boston: Burlington, Canton, Lynn, Scituate, Waltham, Weymouth
339	2001	781	339/781	Greater Boston: Burlington, Canton, Lynn, Scituate, Waltham, Weymouth
508	1988	617	508/774	Southeastern Massachusetts: Brockton, Framingham, Fall River, Nantucket, New Bedford, Plymouth, Worcester
774	2001	508	508/774	Southeastern Massachusetts: Brockton, Framingham, Fall River, Nantucket, New Bedford, Plymouth, Worcester
978	1997	508	351/978	Northeastern Massachusetts: Athol, Concord, Fitchburg, Gloucester, Haverhill, Lowell, Salem
351	2001	978	351/978	Northeastern Massachusetts: Athol, Concord, Fitchburg, Gloucester, Haverhill, Lowell, Salem

== See also ==
- List of North American Numbering Plan area codes
- Original North American area codes
