= Area codes 508 and 774 =

Area codes for south-central and most of southeastern Massachusetts

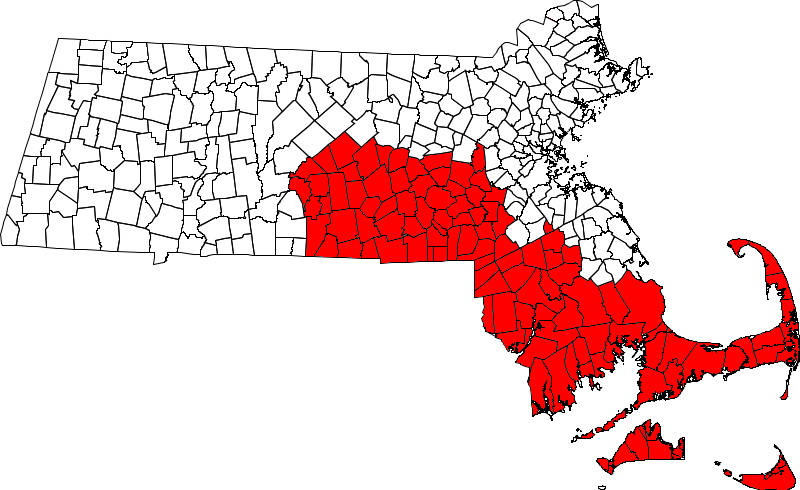
Highlighted area of the numbering plan area overlay of 508 and 774

Map of the Massachusetts area codes since May 2001

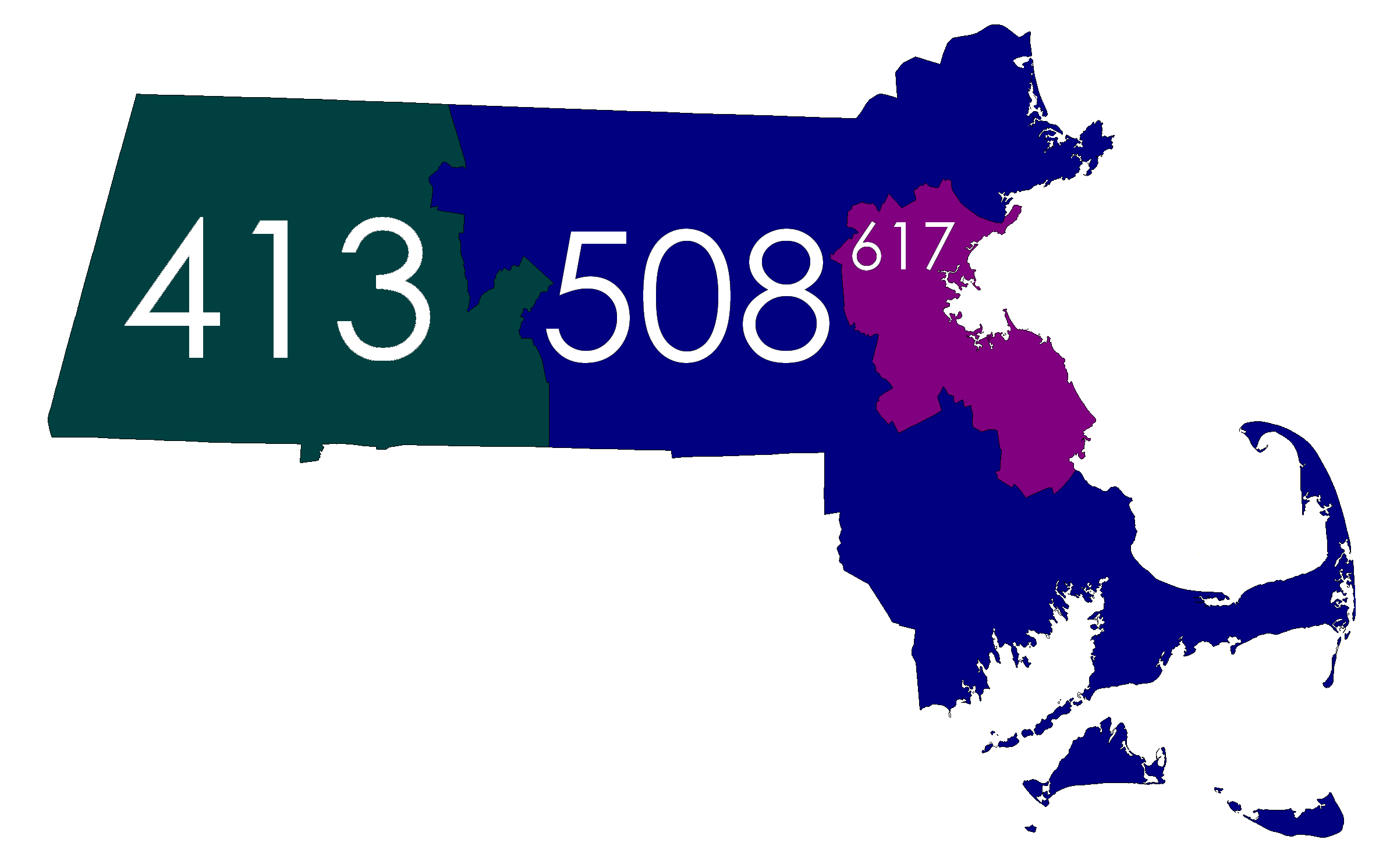
Map of area code 508 from its inception in July 1988 until it was split in September 1997

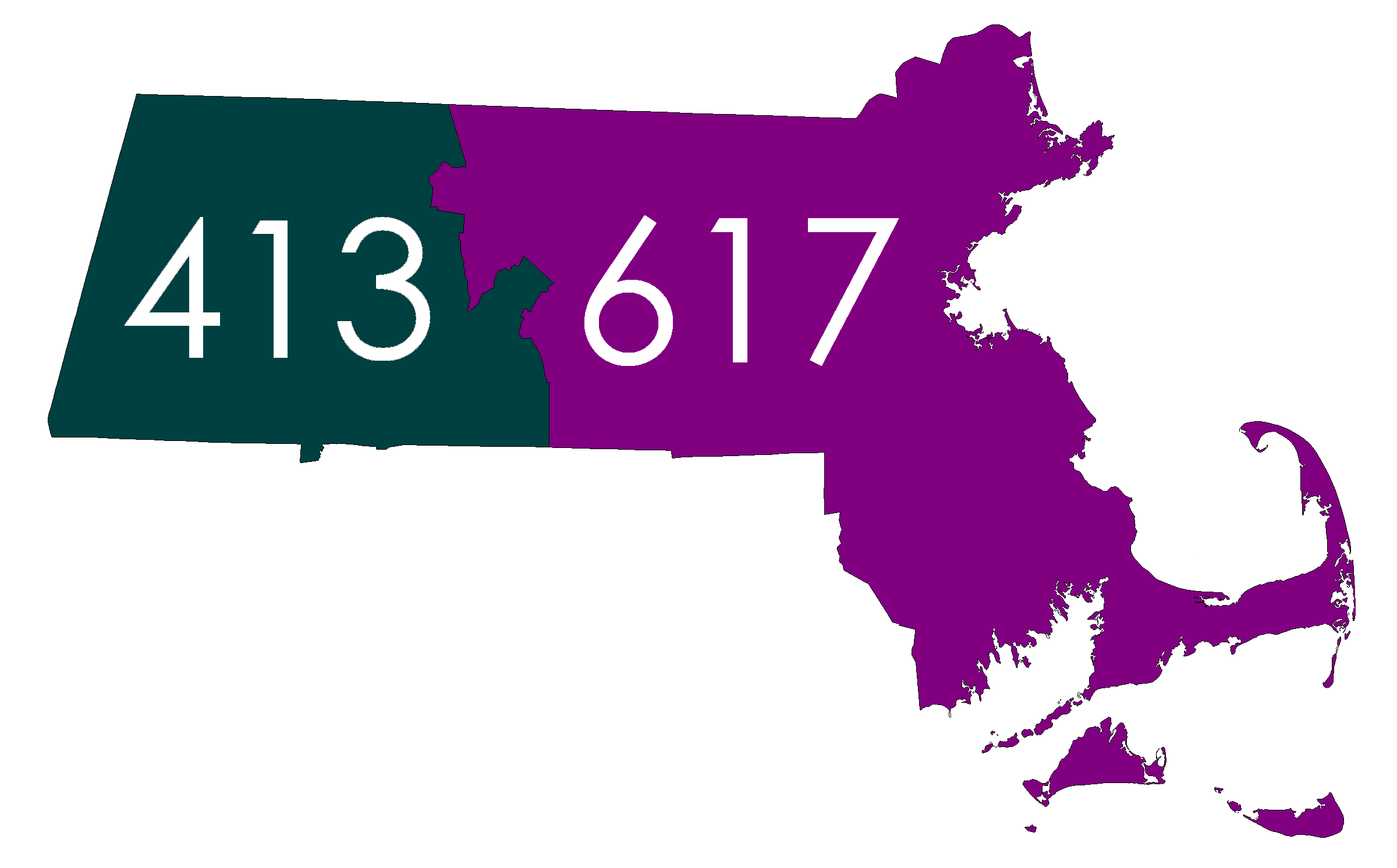
Map of the original two area codes of Massachusetts

Area codes 508 and 774 are telephone area codes in the North American Numbering Plan (NANP) for the U.S. state of Massachusetts. The numbering plan area comprises south-central and most of southeastern Massachusetts (LATA 128). It includes Worcester, Outer south and southwest Greater Boston (such as the MetroWest region), as well as Framingham, Foxborough, Brockton, Attleboro, Taunton, Dartmouth, Fall River, New Bedford, Plymouth, Cape Cod, Martha's Vineyard, and Nantucket.

== History ==
Massachusetts was originally divided into two numbering plan areas, when AT&T published the configuration of the first nationwide telephone numbering plan for Operator Toll Dialing in 1947. Area code 617 was assigned to the eastern two-thirds of Massachusetts from roughly the western end of Worcester County to Boston, The Cape and Islands, and the South Coast, while the western part received area code 413.

Area code 508 was activated for service on July 16, 1988, in an area code split of 617, with a semicircle around Boston retaining 617 and the central offices in the northern, western, and southern parts of the area being reassigned to area code 508. Permissive dialing of 617 and 508 continued until January 1, 1989.

On September 1, 1997, numbering plan area 508 was split, whereby area code 978 was assigned to the northern part of the service area.

Area code 774 was added to the 508 numbering plan area on May 2, 2001, forming an overlay complex and making ten-digit dialing mandatory for all calls.

Some mobile telephone numbers assigned in the 1990s in communities in the former northern half of 508 (now the 978 area code) kept the area code after the split.

As of 2018, NPA 508/774 is projected to be exhausted by 2045.

== Service area ==
The numbering plan area of area codes 508 and 774 includes the southern parts of the regions of Worcester County and MetroWest, as well as Cape Cod, Martha's Vineyard, Nantucket, and the South Coast.

The major towns and cities are Attleboro, Barnstable, Bridgewater, Brockton, Dartmouth, Fall River, Framingham, Franklin, New Bedford, Plymouth, Taunton, and Worcester.

== See also ==
- List of area codes in Massachusetts
- List of North American Numbering Plan area codes

Massachusetts area codes: 413, 508/774, 617/857, 781/339, 978/351
	North: 978/351	
West: 413	508/774	East: 781/339, Atlantic Ocean
	South: 860, 401	
Connecticut area codes: 203/475, 860/959
Rhode Island area codes: 401
