= 211 (North American Numbering Plan) =

Telephone number accessing health care info

- 2-1-1

Background
- N11 code: 211
- Service type: Community and social services hotline
- Introduced: 2000
- Regulatory authority: Federal Communications Commission

Service details
- Purpose: Provides information and referrals to health, human, and social service organizations
- Managed by: Local call centers coordinated by United Way Worldwide and partner agencies
- Availability: Available in most states and territories
- Area restrictions: Services vary by locality
- Access method: Dial 2-1-1 from most telephones; also available via text and web in many regions
- Call cost: Free and confidential
- Status: Active

Implementation
- First deployment: Atlanta, Georgia
- Nationwide coverage: Achieved across most of the United States by the mid-2000s
- Technical standard: North American Numbering Plan

Related services
- 311, 411, 511, 711, 811, 911

211 is an abbreviated dialing code that is reserved in the North American Numbering Plan (NANP) as an easily recognizable code (ERC) and excluded from use as an area code. It is intended to reach local information and referral services to health, human, and social service organizations.

Like the emergency telephone number 911, 211 is one of the eight N11 prefixes of the North American Numbering Plan.

== History ==
=== United States ===
For many years, the New York Telephone Company used 211 as an automated credit request number for disconnected or misdialed calls. This service was active from the 1970s through the early 2000s.

Before the introduction of direct long-distance dialing, the long-distance operator was reached by dialing 211 for placing a long-distance call. When the states in the US and provinces in Canada were assigned area codes in 1947 by the American Telephone and Telegraph Company (AT&T), direct distance dialing (DDD) using the area code and the local number was introduced starting in 1951, eventually eliminating the use of the prefix. After that, the local telephone providers designated "00" for long-distance operator access.

In 1986, the United Way of San Diego created its INFO LINE in partnership with the County and City of San Diego. The United Way of Metropolitan Atlanta introduced a 211 service in 1997. Many states began implementation plans soon after, aided by the United Way of America in partnership with the Alliance of Information and Referral Systems, or AIRS (renamed Inform USA in July 2023) – AIRS operates as a charitable organization, providing information and referral services for nonprofit and government sectors. On July 20, 2000, the Federal Communications Commission (FCC) approved 211 for nationwide use as a short number in the United States along with 5-1-1 for transportation. In Texas, particularly in the Coastal Bend area, 211 is also the number to call for elderly and disabled people needing evacuation assistance in the event of a pending disaster such as a hurricane. The role of libraries in information and referral including 211 has been considered with a case study in Mississippi.

As of 2017, close to 95% of the population in the U.S. (including Puerto Rico and Washington, D.C.) has access to 211 services. More than two-hundred agencies, including United Ways, provide 211 services. The largest population without access to 211 was the metro-Chicago area up until January 2023. In 2017, the 211 network in the U.S. answered close to 15 million requests for assistance through phone, text, and web chat.

=== Canada ===
The Canadian Radio-television and Telecommunications Commission (CRTC) approved the use of 211 throughout Canada on August 9, 2001. The first Canadian 211 service opened in Toronto on June 13, 2002. 211 services are free of charge and multilingual in Canada.

As of October 2020, the whole of Canada, including the territories, has had access to 2–1–1 thanks to a nationwide expansion, following the COVID-19 pandemic.

In Canada, 211 offers free and confidential information and referral for all non emergency needs.

== Operation ==
211 center hours vary. Many are open 24/7 to refer callers to organizations that provide services in such areas as:

- Addiction counseling
- Affordable housing
- Alzheimer's assistance
- Child care
- Debt counseling
- Disaster relief
- Donation opportunities
- Education
- Emergency food, such as food banks and soup kitchens
- ESL
- Financial assistance
- Homeless services
- Indigenous community resources
- Job counseling
- Parenting programs
- Psychotherapy counseling
- Senior citizen programs
- Suicide prevention
- Telephone reassurance, care for the elderly
- Volunteer opportunities
- Youth programs

Where available, 211 is operated by a private non-profit community-service organization, local government or local United Ways, which are part of the broader United Way Worldwide network. 211 provides information and referral to callers on where to obtain assistance from local and national social service programs, local and national governmental agencies and local and national non-profit organizations as well as where to volunteer or make a donation locally. Referrals are often given from databases accessed by call specialists. These databases are maintained by 211 staff following stringent data management guidelines. The databases are typically local but in some cases linked together to form statewide databases.

Many 211 centers are exploring Memorandums of Understanding with state and federal governments to facilitate the efficient handling of future disasters. Television or radio stations could easily tell citizens to call 211 in the event of an emergency. Call specialists at these centers would be informed of current disaster plans or places to receive help and could then inform the public of the correct course of action. After Hurricanes Harvey, Irma, and Maria in Florida, Texas, Puerto Rico, and the Gulf Coast region, 211 centers were instrumental in coordinating with local government officials and providing information to communities before and after local disasters. Furthermore, 211 providers in Massachusetts, Connecticut, and Florida were called upon to provide assistance to individuals fleeing Puerto Rico's devastation.

== Availability ==
=== United States ===
As of May 2017, the service is available in all 50 states and Washington, D.C., and 95% of the U.S. population has access to 211 services by dialing 211 on a landline or cell phone. In 2017, the 211 network answered close to 15 million requests for assistance by phone, text, and chat.

=== Canada ===
In Canada, 211 is available in the following places (starting dates in parentheses). This list may be out-of-date; 211 service coverage is generally expanding over time.

Nova Scotia – 211 Nova Scotia

- province-wide (February 11, 2013)

New Brunswick – 211 New Brunswick

- province-wide (October 15, 2020)

Quebec – 211 Grand Montréal and 211 Québec régions

- Capitale-Nationale Region (April 2008)
- Chaudière-Appalaches Region (April 2008)
- La Haute-Yamaska
- Laval Region (October 2016)
- Greater Montreal (April 2018)

Ontario – 211 Ontario

- Algoma District (September 2010)
- Bruce County (February 2009)
- Frontenac County (June 2010)
- Grey County (February 2009)
- Haliburton County (September 2009)
- Halton Region (2007)
- Huron County (June 2010)
- Kawartha Lakes (September 2009)
- Kingston (June 2010)
- Lennox and Addington County (June 2010)
- London (October 2011)
- Muskoka District (November 2008)
- Niagara Region (November 2005)
- Northumberland County (May 2009)
- Ottawa (September 19, 2008)
- Oxford County (September 2010)
- Peel Region (May 2008)
- Perth County (June 2010)
- Peterborough County (June 2009)
- Renfrew County (February 2011)
- Sault Ste. Marie (September 2009)
- Simcoe County (November 2005)
- Thunder Bay (February 2008)
- Toronto (June 2002)
- Waterloo Region (May 2011)
- Windsor-Essex County (November 2007)

Saskatchewan – United Way 211

- province-wide (September 2013)

Alberta – 211 Alberta

- Calgary (2005)
- Edmonton (2004)

British Columbia – bc211

- Fraser Valley Regional District (October 2010)
- Metro Vancouver (October 2010)
- Sunshine Coast Regional District
- Squamish-Lillooet Regional District (October 2011)
- Vancouver Island\Gulf Islands (September 2017)

The Windsor Star has reported on March 20, 2003, that Windsor, Ontario, intended to have a 211 service up by 2009, as the Provincial Government allocated $311,000 to start it up, with much of the money being donated by the United Way of Canada, but had a set time limit on how long those funds would be available. On November 26, 2007, the City of Windsor's website announced that 211 service for Windsor and Essex County began, and was being run by the United Way (who also runs the local 3-1-1 service).

Plans to introduce 211 services are also in development in other Canadian communities. Ontario extended 211 province-wide in 2012 and Nova Scotia's province-wide 211 deployment will be fully operational in 2014. In British Columbia, 211 services are administered by bc211, and is available on Vancouver Island\Gulf Islands and in the Metro Vancouver, Squamish-Lillooet, Sunshine Coast Regional District and Fraser Valley and regional districts, with plans to expand the services provincially.

In some communities, unused X-1-1 codes were assigned as plant test numbers for telephone installers testing individual lines. In the Canadian province of Prince Edward Island, for instance, when 211 was dialed, it caused a busy signal to occur and the dialer's telephone line would "go dead" for several minutes afterward. These codes must first be "recovered" by moving the test functions elsewhere (958 and 959 are standard reserved local and long-distance test exchanges in most areas) to permit redeployment as local public information numbers.

== Accreditation ==
=== United States ===
The American accrediting body for 211 centers is Inform USA, formerly the Alliance of Information & Referral Systems (AIRS). Inform USA provides an accreditation process for 211 centers and certifies 211 Call Center Representatives as Certified Information and Referral Specialists (CIRS), Certified Information and Referral Specialists for Aging (CIRS-A) and Certified Resource Specialists (CRS) annually. Inform USA standards have been created to provide a benchmark for 211 centers and its staff. The standards regulate nationally how a 211 centers provides services and how they collect and store information.

INFOLINE of Los Angeles, an information and referral services agency serving the greater Los Angeles area, developed a national taxonomy of human services that provides a standard language for information and referral providers nationally. AIRS adopted this taxonomy as its national standard for use in the field of information and referral. This taxonomy provides standard definition of terms, an exact coding structure for referrals and search methodology for providing referrals to consumers.

Accredited 211 centers must have active Memorandums of Understanding with local 9-1-1 service as well as domestic violence providers, elder care providers, mental health providers and local law enforcement.

=== Canada ===
In Canada, professional certification is handled by InformCanada – Fédération Inform Canada, the Canadian national organization of information and referral providers, the Canadian affiliate of the Alliance of Information & Referral System (InformUSA). The national 211 initiative is a partnership between InformCanada and United Way of Canada – Centraide Canada. InformCanada affiliates use the Canadian CIOC: Community Information Online Consortium resources to provide services.

Work is underway to create a bilingual, Canadian Taxonomy of human services based on the AIRS/Infoline Taxonomy. This project is led by InformCanada and significant steps have been made on the creation of a starter taxonomy by the 211 Ontario phase 2 project, funded by the Ontario Trillium Foundation and the government of Canada. Updates on the Canadian Taxonomy Project are maintained by 211.ca.

== Implementation process ==
The number 211 must be captured and approved for assigning through the local telecom companies providing services in the local area. The process of implementing a 211 service in a community has taken many paths since its beginning in 1997. Some places have a centralized statewide system while others have decentralized regional networks with different types of affiliations.

In the United States, each implementation is monitored by the national accrediting entity Alliance of Information & Referral Systems (AIRS) and its local statewide affiliate.

In Canada, the deployment of 211 service is subject to InformCanada accreditation and Canadian Radio-television and Telecommunications Commission (CRTC) approval.

== See also ==
- Crisis hotline
- Fighting poverty
- Social services
- Speed dial
- Suicide and Crisis Lifeline (9-8-8)
