= CitySourced =

SaaS Platform

- Company type: Private
- Website type: Civic Technology
- Available in: English
- Founded: November 2006; 20 years ago
- Headquarters: Los Angeles, California, United States
- Area served: Worldwide
- Owners: Rock Solid Technologies, Inc
- Founder: Jason Kiesel
- Employees: 10
- Website: www.citysourced.com
- Current status: Acquired
- Native clients on: iOS, Android, HTML5

CitySourced was a civic engagement SaaS (Software as a Service) platform that connects citizens to local government agencies and the services they provide. The platform provides HTML5 and iOS/Android citizen-facing client applications that connect with a CRM and Service Request Management application tailored specifically for use within the public sector.

== History ==
In 2006, Jason Kiesel created FreedomSpeaks, a non-partisan political social network that enabled citizens to start grassroots activist campaigns targeting their publicly elected officials. In the spring of 2009, FreedomSpeaks began development on the CitySourced mobile application to help citizen report problems in their neighborhood directly to City Hall. CitySourced officially launched in September 2009 at the 2009 TechCrunch50 startup conference. In December 2011, the company raised a $1.3 million Series A investment and officially changed its name from FreedomSpeaks, Inc. to CitySourced, Inc.

In March 2013, the company launched ZenFunder, a civic crowdfunding product that allows municipal governments and schools districts to raise funds for specific projects by crowdfunding the proposed projects directly from residents or citizens. The ZenFunder product was sunsetted approximately one year later due to a lack of customer demand.

In April 2019, the company merged with government CRM software provider Rock Solid Technologies, Inc. through the backing of the Austin-based private equity firm Strattam Capital.

== Awards ==
- 2009: TechCrunch50 Finalist at the 2009 TechCrunch50 Conference
- 2013: IBM Beacon Award Finalist
