= The Clean Air Campaign =

American environmental organization in the state of Georgia

- Founded: 1996
- Dissolved: 2016
- Type: Environmental Awareness
- Purpose: Air Quality & Transportation Demand Management
- Location: Atlanta, Georgia
- Region served: The State of Georgia
- Key people: Tedra Cheatham, Executive Director
- Website: https://web.archive.org/web/20160315015145/http://www.cleanaircampaign.org/ Mark Telling, Director of Finance Mike Williams, Director of Programs and Employer Services

The Clean Air Campaign was a not-for-profit organization that motivated Georgians to take action to improve air quality and reduce traffic congestion. The organization was formed in 1996 by government, business, civic, health, environmental and educational organizations to address traffic congestion and air quality issues in the metro Atlanta region.

Until 2014, The Clean Air Campaign received 80 percent of its funding from U.S. Department of Transportation Congestion Mitigation and Air Quality Improvement (CMAQ) Program funds. After that date, The Clean Air Campaign secured private funding through corporate and foundation grants to deploy demand management programs and services to employers, commuters and schools.

The campaign ran for 20 years and was discontinued in December 2016.

== Public education ==
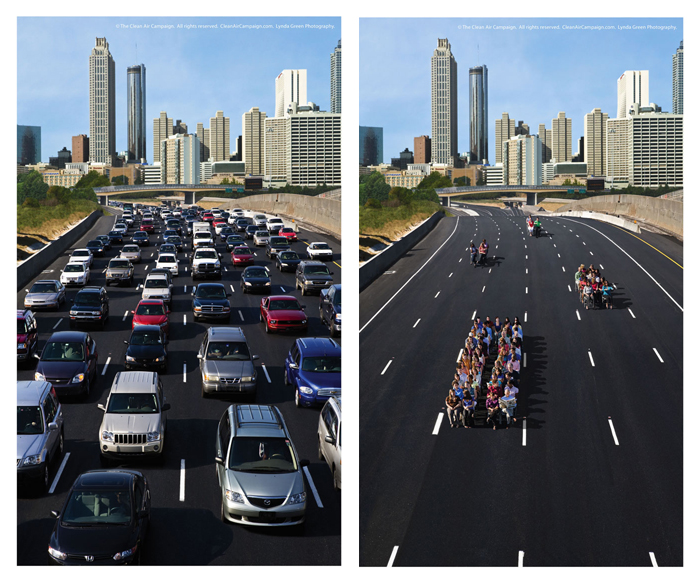
Traffic with 73 solo drivers vs. traffic with 73 commuters using commute alternatives including bus, carpool and vanpool.

The Clean Air Campaign was formed in 1996 following an initiative by Atlanta business, civic, environmental and political leaders which led to less traffic and air pollution during the 1996 Olympics. The non-profit organization fulfilled its education efforts through mass advertising, public relations and community outreach. These education efforts were part of a statewide strategic approach to improve mobility and air quality, bringing public and private sector interests together.

== Employer rewards programs ==
The Clean Air Campaign worked with employers in the region, given that high concentrations of employees commuting to a common destination during peak travel periods are a high-value audience for their programs. According to a 2010 survey conducted by the Center for Transportation and the Environment on behalf of the Georgia Department of Transportation, 82 percent of metro Atlanta commuters drive alone to and from work. .

=== Employer partnership program ===
The Clean Air Campaign's principal method of engaging employers was through its general Employer Partnership Program. Campaign experts designed a commute alternative program tailored to the specific needs of the employer based on workforce size, operating hours, office access to public transit and an array of other factors.

Campaign staff were then able to assist the employer with employee outreach through programs such as onsite "transportation fairs," educational sessions and assistance in taking advantage of available alternative commute incentives.

=== Alternative work arrangement consulting ===
The Clean Air Campaign developed alternative work arrangements typically to augment an alternative commute program. Telework, compressed work weeks and flextime are all viable options employed to reduce the number of instances in which employees must commute to work during peak traffic hours or inclement weather conditions. This element of The Clean Air Campaign's program was unique in that it aimed to assist with business continuity planning as much as transportation demand management and air pollution mitigation. This program also proved critical to employers whose workforces were affected by Atlanta's frequent road and highway closures.

As one of the leading American cities when it comes to wireless and broadband internet access, the Atlanta metro area stands to benefit economically from the expanded adoption of telework. Based on 2010 survey data, 600,000 metro Atlanta employees telework occasionally and another 245,000 employees do not have permission from their employer to telework but believe their job function would allow it. Clean Air Campaign lobbied to keep Georgia's telework tax credit in place, as well as assisting businesses in taking advantage of these available funds.

== The One Ton Challenge ==
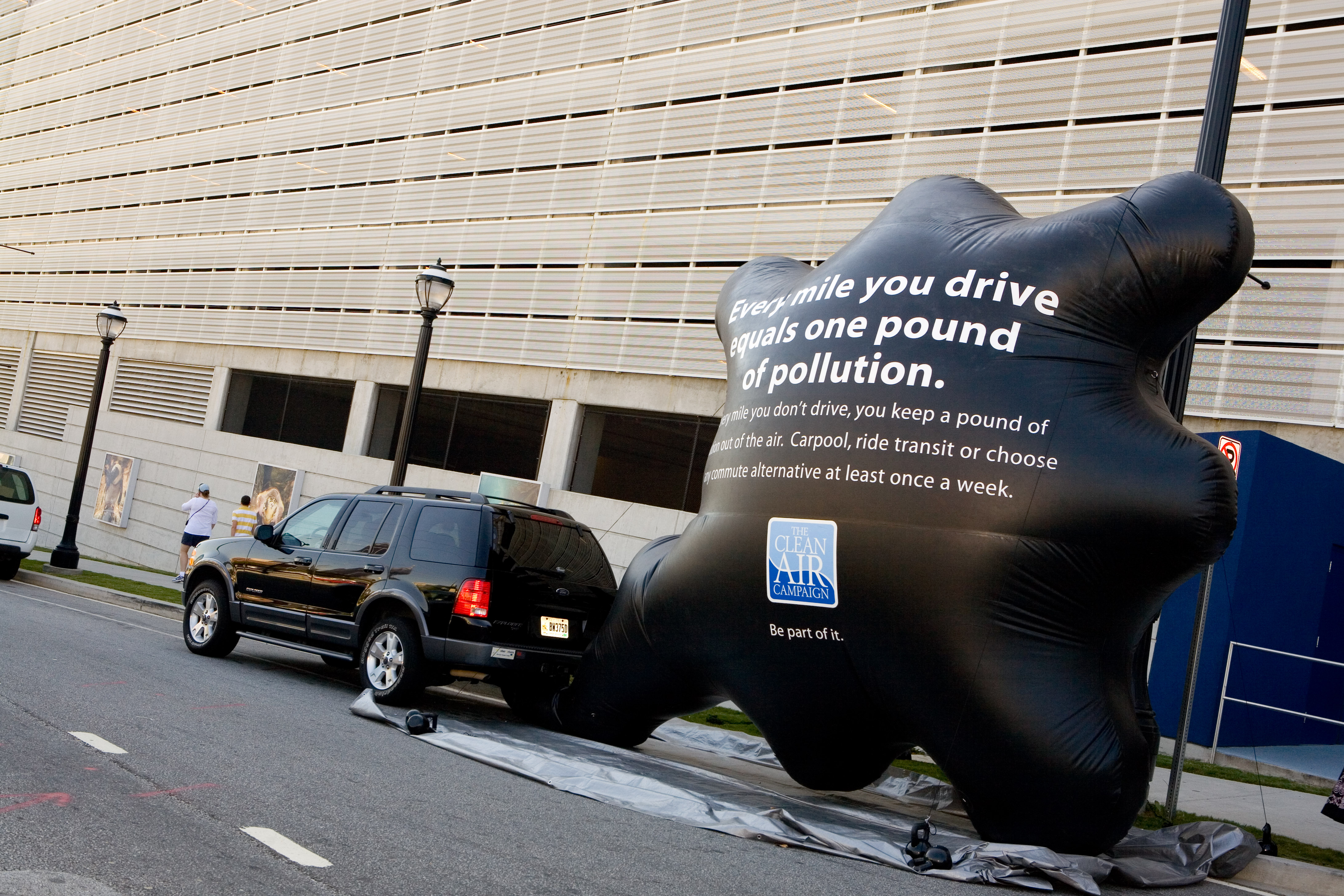
A Clean Air Campaign promotion utilizing an exhaust-cloud shaped balloon.

The One Ton Challenge was a statewide effort to encourage commuters to use a commute alternative. By tying a measurable and easily understandable amount of impact on the environment (one ton of atmospheric pollutants conserved) to a clear and consistent call to action (one alternative commute to work per week) this challenge attempted to provide a more tangible, less abstract illustration of the environmental benefits provided by alternative commute options.

The challenge derived from the fact that an individual commuter in metro Atlanta is capable of eliminating a full ton of atmospheric pollutants simply by using an alternative commuting method once per week. The average round-trip commute distance in Atlanta is 40 miles. It is estimated that one pound of atmospheric pollution is emitted per mile driven in a conventional vehicle. By eliminating one commute per week, or roughly 52 commutes per year, the average Atlantan would keep 2,080 lbs., or slightly over one ton, of pollution out of the air.

Over 3,600 commuters participated in the challenge in 2008, the program's first year.

== Clean Air Schools program ==
In 2004, The Clean Air Campaign introduced Clean Air Schools, an education outreach program that engaged the entire school community in improving air quality. Initially offered to a select group of elementary schools in the 20-county metro Atlanta region, the program was expanded in 2008 to include middle and high schools statewide and the name changed to Clean Air Schools.

Later, the Clean Air Schools program focused on two teen-targeted programs: Get There Green, a high school transportation planning challenge, and OnAir, a clean air website and social media initiative that rewards teens with 'AirCreds' for taking clean transportation modes and completing other air-friendly tasks. Since the end of the Clean Air Campaign in 2016, this work has continued through OnAir Schools, an initiative of the Green Schools Alliance.
