= Police 101 =

Phone number for UK local police forces

101 is the police single non-emergency number (SNEN) in the United Kingdom (UK), which automatically connects the caller to their local police force, in a similar manner to the pre-existing 999 emergency number. The 101 service was created to ease pressure, and abuse of the existing 999 system. Hazel Blears, then a UK government minister in the Home Office, stated that the new system would "strengthen community engagement". In 2004, ten million 999 calls were made in the UK; however, 70% of those calls were deemed not to be an emergency.

The 101 number does not work for calls originating from outside the United Kingdom. Should the need arise to contact a UK police force when abroad, the pre-existing UK geographic number for the required police force should be dialled.

== Uses ==
Promotional identity of the scheme

The 101 service is for reporting minor and non-emergency crimes, where immediate or high-priority response is not required, and life is not in immediate danger, such as:

- To report a crime, if the suspect is no longer in the area
- To offer evidence for an investigation
- To give the police information about a threat of crime
- To make an enquiry to the police
- To verify that a police officer is genuine

The 101 system determines the caller's location based on the telephone exchange or cell tower they are connected to, and automatically connects them to the police force covering that area, unless the caller chooses otherwise. In some cases, some people may be given an option of choosing from multiple forces, if they are close to a boundary. If the caller would like to speak to a different police force to the one(s) determined by the automated system, they are prompted to verbally choose, by speaking the name of the force they need; however, major towns, cities, and counties will also be accepted, with the caller being redirected to the police force that covers that area. If the system is still unable to determine the correct force, then the caller will be transferred to a national human operator who will determine this instead, and then connect the caller to the appropriate force.

The more long-established emergency number 999 or 112 should be called in emergencies, when an immediate police presence is needed. These include cases where:

- A crime is in progress
- A crime appears to be imminent
- A suspect is at a scene or nearby
- There is danger to life

A non-emergency 101 call may be transferred to the emergency 999/112 call system by handlers if it is deemed to be an emergency.

A textphone service is available on 18001 101 for those who are deaf, hard-of-hearing or speech-impaired. All of these calls are routed to a national 101 operator who will determine the correct police force, and introduce the caller to the police operator.

== Issues ==
- 101 may be easily mistaken for NHS 111, which offers non-emergency medical advice.
- 101 calls were originally chargeable at a flat rate of 10 pence per call from mobiles and landlines, subsequently increased to 15 pence, to the surprise of many people. This incentivised some people to call 999 when they could have called 101, contrary to an aim to encourage people to use 101 not 999 wherever appropriate. However, since 1 April 2020, it is now free to call 101.
- Mobile phone users on a pay-as-you-go deal with an inclusive call and text allowance but no separate credit, which is most often the case, have been unable to make a 101 call. This could have led to them dialling 999 inappropriately, or being forced to use a public phone box (which is free of charge) to make a 101 call.
- Some media reports have highlighted cases where the response times to 101 calls has been slow.

The Telegraph reported in October 2015 on problems with the 101 service: for example, over one million calls were abandoned or dropped in 2013, and some callers were waiting more than an hour to get through.

== Coverage ==
As of 2019, all 45 territorial police forces in the UK are covered by the 101 number.

=== Exceptions ===
UK Police forces that are not under the authority of the Home Office are mostly not covered by the 101 number. The list includes, but is not limited to:

- British Transport Police
- Port of Dover Police
- Civil Nuclear Constabulary
- Ministry of Defence Police
- Mersey Tunnels Police

The following police forces serve territories that are outside of the United Kingdom, and therefore are not covered by the 101 number either:

- Guernsey Police
- Isle of Man Constabulary
- Jersey Police

== Cost of calls ==
Calls to the 101 number from a BT payphone have always been free of charge, as BT decided to not amend the mechanism that applies a 60p minimum charge for chargeable calls.

Before 1 April 2020, calls to 101 used to cost a fixed fee of 15 pence per call from landlines and mobiles, regardless of time of day or duration. This charge was waived by mobile provider giffgaff beginning in the summer of 2018. Vodafone UK, the single supplier for the 101 service, waived the charge for pay-as-you-go customers from 1 June 2019. Both Virgin Media and Virgin Mobile waived the charge for calling 101 from mid 2019.

The decision to scrap the 15p charge for all callers was announced on 28 May 2019 by the Home Office. From 1 April 2020, the vast majority of people can call 101 free of charge. However, from 1 April to 1 July there remains a chance that users of small operators will be charged for using the 101 service. The Home Office will be urging those providers to refund their customers.

== History ==
Previously, the police forces all had individual local phone numbers; this new system made all police forces' non-emergency number 101.

A pilot 101 system with joint police and local authority call centres began in 2006. First introduced in Hampshire and the Isle of Wight for £3.3 million, the service was later extended in the summer of 2006 to Cardiff, Sheffield, Northumberland, Tyne and Wear, Leicester City, and Rutland.

In South Yorkshire, from June 2006, the 101 number could also be used to connect to South Yorkshire Partnership, which was a joint partnership between Sheffield City Council and South Yorkshire Police.

The 101 service provided advice, information and action, 24 hours a day, 7 days a week, for the following issues:

- Vandalism, graffiti and other deliberate damage to property
- Noisy neighbours and noise nuisance
- Intimidation and harassment
- Abandoned vehicles
- Rubbish and litter, including fly tipping
- People being drunk or rowdy in public places
- Drug-related anti-social behaviour
- Problems with street lighting

The planned nationwide roll-out of the original service never took place, and the trial itself was withdrawn from several areas after the withdrawal of Home Office funding. In 2009, the number was instead adopted as a straightforward non-emergency number by the four police forces in Wales, with the local authority element dropped.

The number was then rolled out across all English police forces between 2011 and 2012, and extended to Scotland in April 2013. The Police Service of Northern Ireland followed suit by adopting the 101 number on 24 March 2014.

== Future ==
Similar projects such as the Missing People 116 000 number, the NSPCC 116 111 number, and The Samaritans 116 123 number are all part of the European Union's harmonised service of social value commission, who designate simple telephone numbers for helplines of social importance helping citizens in need.

== See also ==
- 999 (emergency telephone number)
- Emergency telephone number
- 3-1-1 – non-emergency number in many communities in the US and Canada
- NHS 111 – non-emergency health advice in England, Scotland and parts of Wales.
