= Short code =

Short telephone numbers for voice, text and MMS services from mobile phones

Short codes, or short numbers, are short digit-sequences – significantly easier to read and remember than telephone numbers – that are used to address messages in the Multimedia Messaging System (MMS) and short message service (SMS) systems of mobile network operators. In addition to messaging, they may be used in abbreviated dialing.

Short codes are unique to each operator at the technological level. Even so, providers generally have agreements to avoid overlaps. In some countries, such as the United States, some classes of numbers are inter-operator (used by multiple providers or carriers). U.S. inter-operator numbers are called common short codes.

Organisations often use short codes to encourage users to engage with services such as charity donations, mobile services, ordering ringtones, or television-program voting. Messages sent to a short code can be billed at a higher rate than a standard SMS and can sometimes subscribe users to a recurring monthly services. These charges continue to appear on the user's mobile-phone bill until the user texts, for example, the word "STOP" to cancel the subscription.

== Short codes and service identifiers (prefix) ==
Short codes are often associated with automated services. An automated program can handle the response and typically requires the sender to start the message with a command word or prefix. The service then responds to the command appropriately.

In ads or in other printed material where a provider has to provide both a prefix and the short code number, the advertisement will typically follow this format:

- Long version: "Text Football to 72404 for latest football news."
- Short version: "football@72404"

== Regional differences ==
The cost, format, and rules for short codes vary by region. In certain places, such as the Czech Republic, billing for short codes can differ between mobile originating (MO) and mobile terminating (MT) calls and SMS.

The table below lists the most common short code formats by region or country, along with some basic information such as cost or governing agency, while the subsections below explain these regional differences in greater detail:

Country / Region	Format	Notes
Albania	5xxxx	Also known as short codes for value added service.
Australia	19xxxx, 19xxxxxx	Issued by: Communications Alliance Ltd, WMC Global. Codes start with "19". Transactional and Subscription services require a double sms MO opt-in or Web based opt-in with an MO reply.
Bangladesh	xxxxx	Issued by: Bangladesh Telecommunication Regulatory Commission (BTRC).
Belgium	xxxx	
Botswana	xxx	
Brazil	xxxxx	
Cambodia	1xxx	
Canada	xxxxx, xxxxxx	Governed by: Canadian Wireless Telecommunications Association. Codes beginning with "4" are reserved for wireless network operators. Four-digit codes are not permitted due to handset incompatibilities.
Chile	xxx, xxxx	
Czech Republic	9xxxxpp (MO), 9xxxx (MT), 9xxxxppp (MT)	pp and ppp express the price. E.g., an SMS sent to "9090930" is billed for Kč30. Five digit codes are not billed.
Denmark	xxx, xxxx	
Dominican Republic	xxxx, xxxxx	
Ethiopia	8xxx	Mostly used for fundraising, lottery and polling.
European Union	xxxxxx	EU-wide codes start with "11". E.g.: 118xxx for directory services or 116xxx for emergency helplines (which is in addition to the EU-wide emergency number, 112).
Faroe Islands	12xx, 19xx	
Finland	xxxxx[...]	Codes can be five or more digits long, but are usually only five or six digits long.
France	xxxxx	The digits at the start define the cost of the service.
Germany	xxxx, xxxxx	
Greece	xxxxx	
Hong Kong	50xx, 50xxx, 50xxxx, 50xxxxx, 50xxxxxx	Codes start with "501" through "509". Emergency number is 992.
Hungary	xxxx, xxxxx	
India	5xxxx[ddd]	Codes are five digits long and start with "5". Many companies rent keywords whose characters on a typical telephone keypad represent short codes. E.g.: "JEWEL" would be "53935". Codes can be extended by up to three digits to represent three more characters. E.g.: "JEWELER" (5393537), which would otherwise be too long.
Indonesia	xxxx	Codes come with a Rp2000 premium price.
Republic of Ireland	5xxxx	The second digit generally indicates the maximum price (0 = free, 1 = standard text rate, 3 = €0.60, 7 = no maximum). 59xxx codes are ostensibly intended for adult services, but few if any of these codes are used.
Italy	xxx[...]	Codes have no fixed length, but are typically three to five digits long. Codes starting with "4" are designated by law for "network services".Widely known short codes are in the 48xxx range, commercial ringtones and mobile stuff download.
South Korea	xxxx[...]	Codes have no fixed length, but are typically four to six digits long.
Latvia	xxx[...]	Codes have no fixed length, but are typically three to five digits long. 118x and 1184x codes are designated to information service providers.
Lithuania	xxx	Codes have no fixed length, but are typically three to five digits long. Codes starting with "1" are designated by law for "network services".
Malaysia	2xxxx, 3xxxx	
Morocco	xxxx	
Nepal	xxx, xxxx	Dialed codes are generally three digits long and reserved for public services. SMS codes are four digits long and are used for a wide range of purposes.
The Netherlands	xxxx	
New Zealand	xxx, xxxx	
Nigeria	xxxx, xxxxx	
Norway	xxxx, xxxxx	
Pakistan	xxx, xxxx	
Panama	xxxx	
Poland	1xxxx	
The Philippines	xxxxxxx	
Russia	xxxx	Calls and text messages cost between 1.2 and 300 rubles, depending on the number and the carrier.
Serbia	xxxx	
Singapore	xxxxx	
South Africa	3xxxx, 4xxxx	Codes and code ranges (ranges are generally xxxx0 to xxxx9) are assigned specific tariffs or end user prices (EUP). Charges can range from R0.50 to R30.00 (for MO billing), or R0.50 to R50.00 (for MT billing). Due to high costs for short code rental, many providers offer shared codes, greatly reducing the cost.
Spain	xxxx	
Sweden	xxxxx	
Switzerland	xxx, xxxx, xxxxx	Most popular codes are three digits long. Codes starting with "6" are reserved for adult services.
Taiwan	19xx	Codes are usually four digits long and start with "19".
Turkey	xxxx	
United Kingdom	xxxxx, xxxxxx, xxxxxxx	Codes are usually between five and seven digits long and start with "6", "7" or "8". Codes starting with "70" are used by charities, "72" are used by Society Lotteries, and "69" and "89" are used by adult services. Mobile operators sometimes use proprietary codes for operator-specific functions.
United States	xxxxx, xxxxxx	Codes never start with "1" and only work in the U.S.

=== Canada ===
Canadian short codes are called Canadian Common Short Codes. Short code-based messages vary between zero-rated (paid for by the campaign), standard rate (user pays standard carrier charges), and premium rate (varies, between C$1-10).

In February 2020, the Canadian Wireless Telecommunications Association (CWTA) announced that Rogers Wireless will no longer participate in general use mobile codes. A common short code is a code that is shared by more than one brand for multiple or general uses.

=== Czech Republic ===
Messages sent to or from short codes in the Czech Republic are known as Premium Rate SMS. The three leading digits make up a "purpose type" prefix (e.g.: "908" for micro payments, "909" for adult content and "900" for everything else), while digits four and five determine the service provider (registered by a network operator). There are also other four digit short codes that are used by network operators for service-only purposes and are operator dependent.

=== Ethiopia ===
Although the telecom sector in Ethiopia is controlled by the government, short code services are outsourced to the private sector.

=== India ===
Many companies in the Indian market rent keywords on a monthly basis. The numbers on a typical telephone keypad corresponding to the letters in the keyword represent a short code. These codes are five digits long and have to start with the digit "5", but the code can be extended by three additional digits to represent three additional characters. Texts sent to these codes are commonly referred to as Premium Rate SMS Messages and cost around Rs 1 to Rs 3 per text, depending on the operator as well as the service. Messages up to 100 to 500 characters long can be sent, depending on the provider.

=== Malaysia ===
Codes have premium pricing ranging from RM0.30 up to 10.00. Codes are MT billed so subscription services are allowed. Upon service description approval by mobile operators, dedicated codes are generally live in 4 weeks, and shared codes after 1 week.

=== Pakistan ===
Users are charged PKR 5 to PKR 25 per SMS sent on short codes. Mobile operators charge a setup fee, monthly fee and fee per keyword for short codes. Short codes usage must abide by the rules set by Pakistan Telecom Authority (PTA).

=== Poland ===
Commercial codes are reachable from mobile and fixed networks. Calls from any type of network to short codes are routed based on the location of the number originating the call. Thus, the subscriber might need to prefix the code with an appropriate area code depending on the area they are trying to reach.

=== The Philippines ===
The National Telecommunications Commission (NTC) is a regulatory agency for information and communications technology in the Philippines. Although the NTC is ultimately responsible for the governance of premium and non-premium short codes, the NTC's regulatory guidelines are not comprehensive when applied to short codes. Instead the NTC's guidelines focus more on the carriers and the carriers' technical infrastructure. While the NTC's website does have documentation for bulk SMS and spam control (the "AMENDMENT TO THE RULES AND REGULATIONS ON BROADCAST MESSAGING SERVICES"), it does not contain any specific information with regard to premium SMS or standard rate SMS.

=== United Kingdom ===
Short codes are often owned by holding companies who then lease them out to service providers and advertisers to promote SMS services, charitable fundraising and marketing promotions such as news alerts, voting and quizzes.

Codes that start with "70" are used by charities, while codes that start with "72" are used by Society Lotteries. Adult-related mobile services are required to use codes starting with "69" or "89". Mobile operators sometimes use proprietary codes (that either have a different leading digit, or are shorter in length) for operator-specific functions. Depending on the service offered, users may interact with service providers by calling or texting the number.

Calls to mobile short codes may be free, or charged at a rate per call or per minute. Where the number can be called from any mobile network, the same charge will apply regardless of which network is used. Messages sent to mobile short codes may be charged at a "standard rate" or with an additional premium charge. Where messages incur a "standard rate" charge, this is set by the sender's mobile provider and varies by provider. Messages received from short codes may be free or may incur a premium charge. Messages can be used to deliver additional content, or a link that opens up the user's web browser to a specific web page. For subscription services, the charges may recur on a daily, weekly, monthly or other basis. These subscriptions can be stopped by texting the word "STOP" to the short code number.

The service provider must state all applicable charges alongside the number. Calls and messages to mobile short codes do not count towards inclusive allowances or bundles.

Where the benefit passed on to the service provider is more than 10p per call, per minute or per message, Ofcom's Premium Rate Services Condition defines it as being a Controlled Premium Rate Service (CPRS) and is subject to the additional regulations detailed in The Regulation of Premium Rate Services Order 2024.

Until 31 January 2025, these services were regulated by the Phone-paid Services Authority. As of 1 February 2025, Ofcom has regulated these services directly. A number of key PSA staff had already been embedded within Ofcom for some time in preparation for this move.

=== United States ===
Codes are leased by the short code program's registry service provider GCH Technologies, under a deal with the Common Short Code Administration and Cellular Telecommunications & Internet Association (CTIA). It costs twice as much to choose a specific code as it does to get one that is randomly assigned. Some carriers assign a subset of their carrier-specific codes to third parties.

The Short Code Registry maintains a single database of available, reserved and registered short codes. CTIA administers the Common Short Code program, and GCH Technologies became the official U.S. Short Code Registry service provider in January 2016.

Texting "HELP" to a short code causes the short code service to return a message with terms and conditions, support information – consisting of either a toll-free phone number or email address at minimum – and other information from the leaseholder of the short code. Texting "STOP", "END", "QUIT", "CANCEL", or "UNSUBSCRIBE" to the short code opts the user out of receiving any further messages. After doing so, one final message is sent to confirm the opt-out.

== See also ==
- Abbreviated dialing
- Vertical service code
