= 8-1-1 =

Telephone number

8-1-1 is an N-1-1 telephone number in Canada and the United States. In Canada, the number is used for non-urgent health services. In the United States, 8-1-1 provides a uniform national phone number to access local utility location services.

== By country ==
=== Canada ===
In July 2005, the Canadian Radio-television and Telecommunications Commission (CRTC) assigned 8-1-1 for non-urgent health teletriage/telehealth services. In May 2008, the province of Quebec announced the adoption of 8-1-1 for this purpose, followed by the Yukon in July 2008, British Columbia in November 2008, Nova Scotia in July 2009, Saskatchewan in March 2013, Alberta in June 2015, Newfoundland and Labrador in July 2015, and Ontario in April 2022. Since 1997, New Brunswick implemented a province-wide Tele-Care service, adopting the 8-1-1 number in place of the toll-free 800 number in 2010.

Quebec has since supplemented its teletriage service (Info-Santé) with access to a social worker to deal with situations of psychosocial distress (Info-Social) at the same 8-1-1 number.

=== United States ===

In March 2005, the United States Federal Communications Commission (FCC) made 8-1-1 the universal number for the 71 regional services that coordinate location services for underground public utilities in the U.S. Before that time, each of these "call before you dig" services had its own 800 number, and the FCC and others wanted to make it as easy as possible for everyone planning an excavation to call first.

This safety measure not only helps prevent damage that interrupts telecommunications, but also the cutting of subterranean power lines, water mains, and natural gas pipes. Over 20 million miles of buried utilities exist in the U.S., and damages to these cost in excess of $30 billion annually. On average, an underground utility is damaged every six minutes due to a failure to contact 811 as required by law. According to the Pipeline and Hazardous Materials Safety Administration, using 811 services before digging projects results in a 99% chance of avoiding utility damages, injury, environmental harm, and death.

Underground utilities are located via color-coded markings typically up to and not past the user's service connection or meter. Lines on the other side of the meter or service connection are considered to be part of the customer's property and will typically not be located by these services. Establishment of an abbreviated dialing number for this purpose was required by the Pipeline Safety Improvement Act of 2002.

The use of 8-1-1 for "call before you dig" services was long established in California and Nevada, through an organization known as Underground Service Alert, before the FCC mandated its use for this purpose. While "call before you dig" and the 8-1-1 phone number is the primary awareness campaign in the United States, Canada has switched to "click before you dig" to emphasize online locate requests and contacting one-call centers virtually rather than calling. August 11 is National Safe Digging Day.

== Previous uses ==
Prior to 2005, the FCC had never officially assigned 8-1-1 for any service, but did not prevent its use either. Traditionally, 8-1-1 has been a direct line to the business office of the telephone company providing service on the line. From there, one may perform some or all of the following operations:

- Pay the bill
- Order additional lines
- Order and cancel services
- Order and rent equipment
- Order calling cards
- Speak to customer service

Such services have been merged into 6-1-1. Mobile phones sometimes use 6-1-1 for this purpose as well. Many telephone companies, including Canada's Telus, are experimenting with merging 8-1-1 and 6-1-1 service now that neither will usually route directly to a human operator. Generally, an automatic phone answering system or other automated attendant will now answer both lines anyway.
