= 6-1-1 =

Special purpose telephone number in North America

611 is an abbreviated dialing telephone number in the North American Numbering Plan, implemented by many telephone companies for reporting troubles or customer service with telephone service, or with a payphone. It is an N11 code, which are reserved from assignment as area codes or central office codes, for use in special services.

== Background ==
While 6-1-1 was in use to call repair service in some areas from as early as the 1930s, other codes were also used, the most common being 114 (with 113 used for information). A decision to standardize on 6-1-1 (and 4-1-1 for information) nationwide was made in the 1960s, but the use of 114 was still widespread in the 1970s, and into the 1980s in some areas. In some localities, 6-1-1 was used to report problems with landline telephone service. 8-1-1 was used to report problems with cellular telephone service but this has since been discontinued.

Many landline and mobile phone providers support 611. Some providers who supply other services, such as Internet or cable television, support these other services with 611. While 611 has not been officially designated by the FCC, the code receives nearly 74 million calls annually, making it the most frequently used N11 number in the United States.

611 is not formally assigned by the United States Federal Communications Commission (FCC) or the Canadian Radio-television and Telecommunications Commission (CRTC), but both have chosen not to disturb the assignment as it is generally recognized across the North American Numbering Plan Administration (NANPA).
