= 5-1-1 =

Traffic information telephone hotline in North America

5-1-1 is a transportation and traffic information telephone hotline in most regions of the United States and Canada. Travelers can dial 511, a three-digit telephone number, on landlines and most mobile phones. The number has also extended to be the default name of many state and provincial transportation department road conditions Web sites, such as Wisconsin's site. It is an example of an N11 code, part of the North American Numbering Plan.

5-1-1 services in the United States are organized by state or region. Some 5-1-1 services are limited to information for drivers regarding road conditions and traffic. Other services have a wider scope, also providing information on public transport, carpooling and other services.

== In the United States ==
=== History and implementation ===
Beginning as a research project at the University of North Dakota in the Summer 1995, an Advanced Traveler Information System, known by its phone number #SAFE (#7233). This initial system provided the proof of concept for a statewide application across both North and South Dakota, and later Minnesota. This system proved that all interstates, and state highways, could be covered and information about these roadways could be provided to travelers on demand 24/7. After more than 5 years of around the clock operations, the principles that established the operational and business rules of the #SAFE program were adopted by the FHWA as the initial guidelines of what was to later become 5-1-1.

In March 1998, a 3-digit dialing code was launched in the Cincinnati–Northern Kentucky metropolitan area for the ARTIMIS project. The SmarTraveler service, operated by SmartRoute Systems for the Kentucky Transportation Cabinet since 1995, had been using a 7-digit code (333-3333) which was available to landline phones in both Cincinnati and Northern Kentucky area codes, but cellular callers had to dial a separate code (*1) to access the same touch-tone traffic system. SmartRoute Systems and KYTC negotiated with the two active cellular carriers and Cincinnati Bell and reached an agreement on allowing a 3-digit code "2-1-1" (a number agreed by the carriers), making this the "first in the nation". This implementation was seen as proof that wireless carriers could implement short-codes without a * or # prefix requirement, and led to a series of discussions with the USDOT and the FCC pushing the carriers to release the number (which they viewed as precious internal resources).

On October 2, 1996, Eli Sherer of SmartRoute Systems, along with representatives from ITS America, the USDOT Joint Program Office, and others met with the FCC regarding the possibility of reserving an N11 number nationwide for Advanced Traveler Information Systems. This meeting led to further discussions at ITS America and USDOT, and the information provided was used and molded into the USDOT petition to the FCC for a 3-digit code for ATIS. The USDOT petition (as noted below) did NOT request a specific N11 number; When the FCC ruling was made on July 21, 2001, the 511 code was "ASSIGNED as a national abbreviated dialing code to be used exclusively for access to travel information services," and at the same time, the 211 code was "ASSIGNED as a national abbreviated dialing code to be used to access community information and referral services." Therefore, the 211 code that had been in use in Cincinnati since 1998 was changed to 511.

As of March 2001, at least 300 telephone numbers existed for travel information systems in the United States. To overcome the confusion caused by this array of numbers, the United States Department of Transportation (USDOT) petitioned the Federal Communications Commission (FCC) for a national assignment of a single three-digit N11 dialing code. On July 21, 2000, the FCC assigned 511 as a nationwide telephone number for intelligent transportation system (ITS) traveler information, along with 2-1-1 for social services. Its use is being promoted by the USDOT's ITS initiative.

"On March 8, 1999, the U.S. Department of Transportation (U.S. DOT) petitioned the Federal Communications Commission (FCC) to designate a nationwide three-digit telephone number for traveler information.
On July 21, 2000, the FCC designated 511 as the United States' national travel information telephone number."

The first 511 traveler information system to launch was the Cincinnati area's ARTIMIS hotline in June 2001.

The first statewide 511 traveler information system was launched across the state of Nebraska in October 2001.

Eight states, from Alaska to Maine, pooled resources and expertise to develop the 511 voice-activated phone service for travelers. Led by the Iowa DOT, the multi-state consortium received $700,000 from the Federal Highway Administration to help pay for system design and software development. Each state also provided a 20 percent matching fund, boosting total funds to nearly $900,000. In addition to Iowa, the participating states in the consortium (as of 2011) are Idaho, Indiana, Kentucky, Louisiana, Maine, Minnesota, New Hampshire, Rhode Island, Sacramento Area Council of Governments, and Vermont.

Individual states have the lead role in coordinating 511 deployments. National leadership is provided by the 511 Deployment Coalition. Led by the American Association of State Highway and Transportation Officials (AASHTO), and including travel information experts from more than 30 organizations, the Coalition has developed voluntary guidelines for state transportation agencies to follow when planning 511 service for their states or regions. Other leading member organizations of the Coalition include the American Public Transportation Association (APTA), the Intelligent Transportation Society of America (ITS America), and the U.S. Department of Transportation.

=== Active systems ===
Active 511 systems (in order of deployment date) as of June 30, 2025:

- Ohio
- Nebraska
- Utah
- Hawaii
- Virginia
- Arizona
- Orlando, Florida
- Minnesota
- Washington state
- Iowa
- South Dakota
- Kentucky statewide
- Los Angeles and Southern California
- San Francisco Bay Area
- Montana
- Vermont
- North Dakota
- Alaska
- Maine
- New Hampshire
- Oregon
- Kansas
- North Carolina
- Sacramento, California, and Northern California
- Colorado
- Rhode Island
- Florida
- Idaho
- Wyoming
- Tennessee
- Nevada
- Louisiana
- San Diego
- Southwestern Florida
- St. Louis, Missouri
- California Eastern Sierra
- Georgia
- Eastern Massachusetts
- New Jersey
- New Mexico
- Nova Scotia
- New York
- Wisconsin
- Inland Empire (California)
- Pennsylvania
- Maryland
- West Virginia

==== California ====
===== San Francisco =====
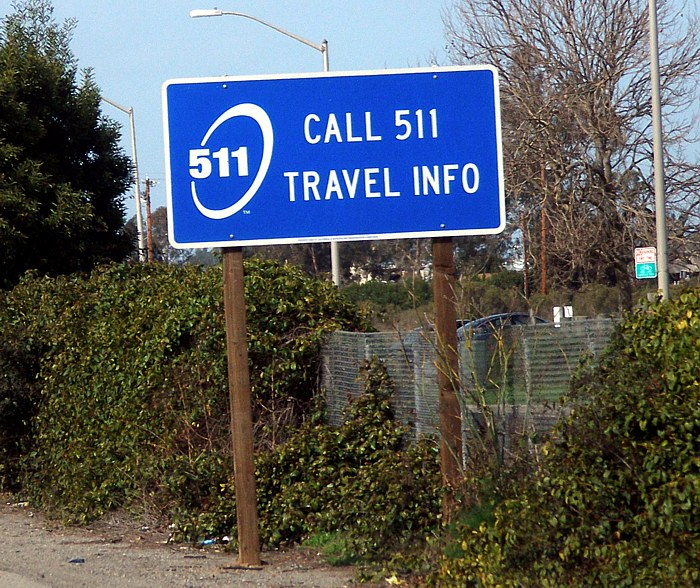
The logo on a road sign

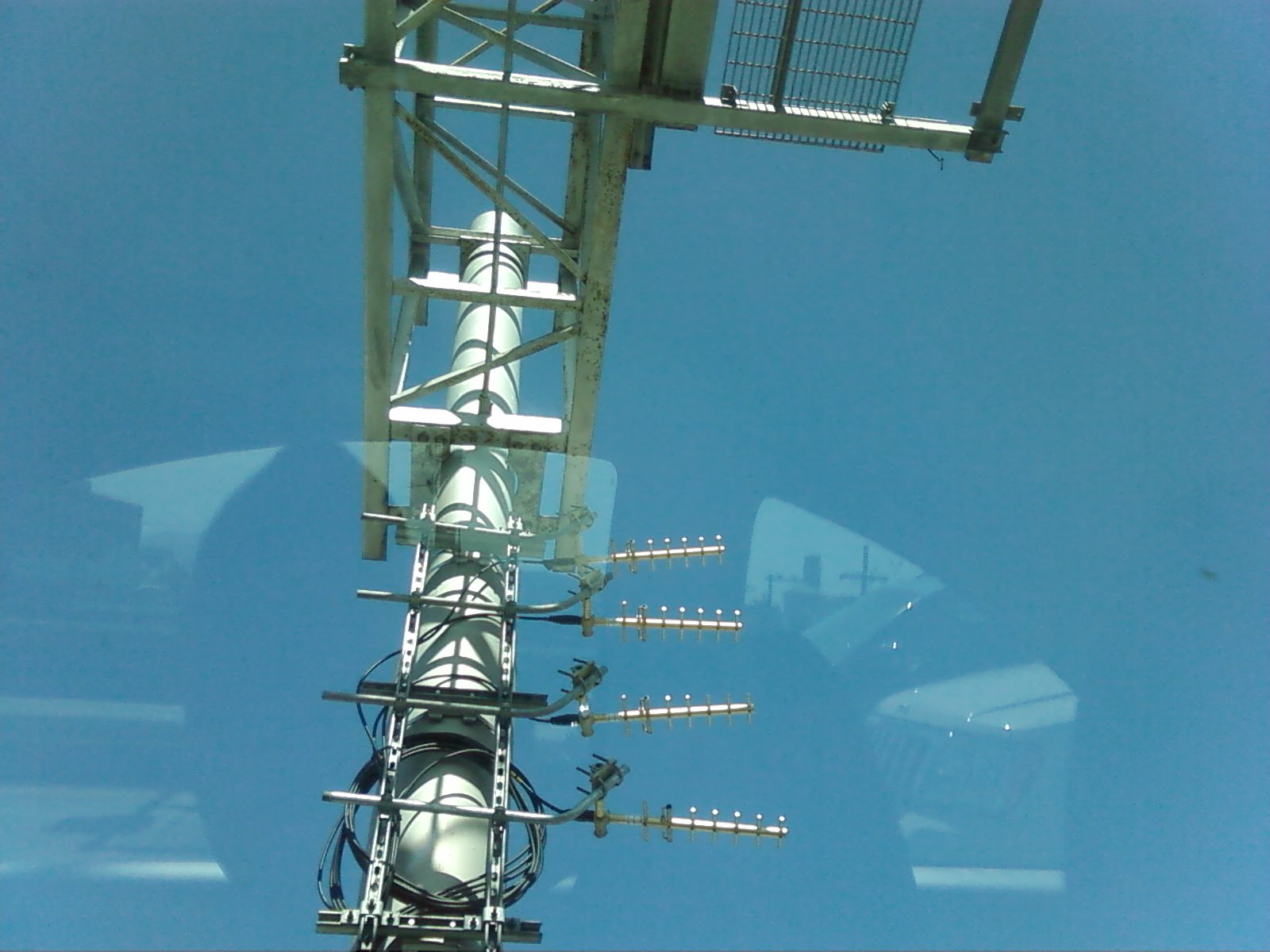
FasTrak antennae that poll vehicle transponders to collect data used to generate 511.org traffic information, San Francisco

Preceded, in 1996, by TravInfo and 817-1717, travelers in the San Francisco Bay Area can use the 5-1-1 phone service, access transit and traffic information on a Web site, 511.org, which provides information on mass transit schedules and an interactive trip planner, which will provide an optimal routing between a given origin, destination, and optional time constraints. In addition, 511.org provides information on bicycling, ridesharing, and the toll road system FasTrak. 511.org is a service of the Metropolitan Transportation Commission, and was designed by the transportation engineering company PB Farradyne, a division of Parsons Brinckerhoff Quade & Douglas, (later Telvent Farradyne). The system had a fair amount of controversy when it was announced that it would use FasTrak electronic toll tags to track vehicles as they traversed Bay Area freeways. 511 has since stopped using FasTrak toll tag data to provide driving times. Driving times are now derived from GPS probe vehicle-based traffic speed data that 511 purchases from INRIX, Inc.

In 2006, the Bay Area's transit coordinator signed an $11 million four-year contract with defense contractor Science Applications International Corporation to operate the local 511 system.

===== San Diego =====
Users of the San Diego area have access to road, transit, and other information via the phone and Web. They can access transit information on a Web site, which provides information on mass transit schedules and an interactive trip planner, which will provide an optimal routing between a given origin, destination, and optional time constraints. In addition, 511sd.com provides information on bicycling, ridesharing, and the toll road system Fastrak. 511sd.com is a service of the San Diego Association of Governments, and was designed by the company ICx Technologies and PB Farradyne (now Telvent Farradyne).

==== Florida ====
Florida has an active 511 system that underwent an overhaul in 2009. Central Florida is claimed to have the most-used 511 system in the nation, on a per capita basis.

==== Georgia ====
This statewide Georgia Navigator system provides traffic, MARTA/GRTA and other public transport, rideshare, Clean Air Campaign, Atlanta and Savannah airport, Amtrak, Greyhound, weather and tourism information in an interactive voice response (IVR) format. Callers are also given the option of connecting to live operators at the Georgia Department of Transportation's Transportation Management Center in Atlanta. Connecting to operators allows users to report traffic accidents to the Georgia State Patrol or local police or sheriffs, or request motorist assistance from the Highway Emergency Response Operators (HERO) program. Callers can also connect to adjacent states' 5-1-1 systems, including North Carolina's.

In January 2011, the Georgia Department of Transportation launched a mobile application on the iPhone platform to provide iPhone users with a mobile option for up to the minute traffic information found on the website. The application also provides special offers and other information about businesses and organizations who participate in the program.

Georgia actually had a system for years before this, using only live operators, and the code *DOT (*368), which could not necessarily be used by those mobile phone users who were roaming from elsewhere, as these codes are specific to each phone company. A local 404 number in metro Atlanta and a toll-free 800 number were used for these and landline calls, and still serve as backup for mobile providers that fail to connect.

==== Kentucky ====
In Kentucky, 511 services cover traffic and weather conditions, and can also be heard on the radio on the AM dial (the Travelers' Information Station) and at 511.ky.gov.

==== New England ====
The New England 511 service covers Maine, New Hampshire and Vermont, providing access to real-time traffic and weather conditions, live cameras, upcoming events and other relevant information.

The service was launched in 2022, as a partnership between the Maine Department of Transportation, New Hampshire Department of Transportation and Vermont Agency of Transportation, with all three organizations continuing to supply updating real-time information.

The site can be found at newengland511.org.

==== New York ====
511 New York is established and administered by the New York State Department of Transportation (NYSDOT). Basic service was launched in the New York City metropolitan area in late 2008. Statewide coverage and more sophisticated services will be added throughout 2009. 511 NY – "Get Connected to Go" is the umbrella brand of The New York State Department of Transportation for traffic, transit and travel information. The 511 New York theme line is: Get Connected to Go. The tag line is: New York State's Official Traffic and Travel Info Source. The credit line is: A Free Service of the New York State Department of Transportation.

In the New York metropolitan area 5-1-1 provides information on bus, subway, and commuter rail mass transit systems in addition to road conditions and traffic information.

==== Pennsylvania ====
Pennsylvania's statewide 511 launched on September 1, 2009. The system provides up to date information on all the states interstate highways. Travelers can also view road conditions and traffic cameras at 511PA.com.

==== Tennessee ====
Implemented in August 2006, Tennessee travelers have the option of accessing road and travel conditions at TN511.com or through the 511 phone service.

==== Virginia ====
The FCC designated 511 as the national traveler information number. Virginia's 511 system began in the Shenandoah Valley in 2000 and went statewide in early 2005. Currently both the 511virginia.org website and calling 511 from any land line or mobile phone provides statewide travelling information. Alternatively, there is now a 511 VDOT app for iOS and Android devices.

==== West Virginia ====
The West Virginia Department of Transportation's (WVDOT) free 511 Traveler Information System provides real-time traffic information, including congestion, construction, lane closures, road conditions and severe weather information on all West Virginia interstates and other major highways. The resource is available 24 hours a day via phone by dialing 511 or online at WV511.org. WV 511 advisories also are available from the WV 511 Drive Safe mobile app and via statewide, regional and roadway-specific Twitter feeds. The public safety alerts (such as Amber alerts and Silver Alerts) carried on 511 are voluntary, cooperative partnerships among law enforcement, WVDOT, other agencies and local broadcasters. WVDOT uses overhead electronic message signs and 511 to get public safety alerts out to the public. 511 was implemented in West Virginia in 2012.

==== Wyoming ====
In the summer of 2007, the original vendor was removed and services were redesigned and improved using Meridian Environmental Technology. The effort to redesign and improve service undertaken summer of 2007 to revamp WYDOT's 511 Travel Information telephone service is paying benefits this winter, based on recent customer feedback.

Some of the additional features are:

- Ability to choose neighboring states that provide 511 information
- Voice recognition, with the option to revert to touchtone keypad input
- Ability to choose route-specific information or regional summaries
- Agency capability to include Alerts (Amber, Homeland, customized)

==== Similar services in the United States ====
The Minnesota Department of Transportation operates a website for traffic and road condition information.

=== Discontinuing services ===
==== Washington ====
The Washington State Department of Transportation launched the state's 511 service in July 2003. On April 24, 2023, the WSDOT announced that it would deactivate the 511 telephone number within the state on May 19 of that year, citing declining usage (attributed to the use of smartphones and GPS navigation), old technology, and cost.

== In Canada ==
=== Implementation ===
The Intelligent Transportation Systems Society of Canada (ITS Canada) has brought together a consortium, the Canada 511 Consortium, to help get 5-1-1 service established in Canada.

In January 2005, the consortium filed an application to assign the 5-1-1 access code in Canada. It proposed that in addition to traffic, the number would report weather, which also has a major impact on traffic, particularly in a country with such harsh winters. The application was approved by the CRTC in Canada on July 28, 2006.

In March 2007, an article in Computing Canada said it was up to each individual province whether or not to launch a 5-1-1 system, but that not all provinces were eager to proceed.

In May 2008, an article in IT World Canada claimed that the 5-1-1 initiative "appears to have lost momentum".

British Columbia began loose implementation of 5-1-1 service in late 2009/early 2010. This replaced the interim mobile service provided by *4997 (*HWYS) which had been in place on Rogers, Telus Mobility and Bell Mobility. BC 5-1-1 service was available to Telus, Telus Mobility and Telus MiKE clients as of 2010. Full service NOT utilizing 5-1-1 is available via DriveBC (a government website/phone line) at www.drivebc.ca or by phone across North America at 1-800-550-4997 (HWYS).

Alberta unveiled its 5-1-1 road report service on February 4, 2013.

In Saskatchewan 5-1-1 redirects to 888-335-7623 which is the Highways Hotline, a Provincial phone information system with highway weather and impassibility information. The Implementation date is Unknown.

=== Active systems ===
Alberta, Manitoba, Ontario, Quebec, New Brunswick, Nova Scotia, Prince Edward Island and the Yukon Territory each have 5-1-1 systems. Most provinces and territories without 5-1-1 systems have other road information hotlines, accessible by dialing various phone numbers.
