= Lists of nicknames =

This is a list of nickname-related list articles on Wikipedia. A nickname is "a familiar or humorous name given to a person or thing instead of or as well as the real name." A nickname is often considered desirable, symbolising a form of acceptance, but can sometimes be a form of ridicule. A moniker also means a nickname or personal name. The word often distinguishes personal names from nicknames that became proper names out of former nicknames. English examples are Bob and Rob, nickname variants for Robert.

== Miscellaneous ==
- Honorific nicknames in popular music
- List of aviators by nickname
- List of classical music sub-titles, nicknames and non-numeric titles
- List of college nickname changes in the United States
- List of Hollywood-inspired nicknames
- List of Marvel Comics nicknames
- List of monarchs by nickname
- List of nicknames for London skyscrapers
- List of nicknames in Philippine entertainment
- List of nicknames of blues musicians
- List of nicknames of German politicians
- List of nicknames of jazz musicians
- List of nicknames of philosophers
- List of nicknames of presidents of the United States
- List of nicknames used by Huey Long
- List of nicknames used by George W. Bush
- List of nicknames used by Donald Trump
- List of playing-card nicknames
- List of rabbis known by acronyms
- List of regional nicknames
- List of fandom names
- List of U.S. state and territory nicknames
- Nicknames of politicians and personalities in Quebec
- Scholastic accolades

== City nicknames ==
- List of cities nicknamed Hub of the Universe
- List of city nicknames in Azerbaijan
- List of city nicknames in Canada
- List of city nicknames in China
- List of city nicknames in India
- List of city nicknames in Indonesia
- List of city nicknames in Italy
- List of city nicknames in Japan
- List of city and town nicknames in New Zealand
- List of city and municipality nicknames in the Philippines
- List of city nicknames in Spain
- List of city nicknames in Turkey
- List of city nicknames in the United Kingdom
- List of city nicknames in the United States
- Nicknames of Vancouver

=== United States ===
By city (alphabetical by city)

- Nicknames of Atlanta
- Boston nicknames
- Nicknames of Chicago
- Nicknames of Cincinnati
- List of nicknames for Cleveland
- Nicknames of Houston
- Nicknames of New York City
- Nicknames of Philadelphia
- List of nicknames for Pittsburgh
- Nicknames of Portland, Oregon

By state

- List of city nicknames in Alabama
- List of city nicknames in Alaska
- List of city nicknames in Arizona
- List of city nicknames in Arkansas
- List of city nicknames in California
- List of city nicknames in Colorado
- List of city nicknames in Connecticut
- List of city nicknames in Delaware
- List of city nicknames in Florida
- List of city nicknames in Georgia
- List of city nicknames in Hawaii
- List of city nicknames in Idaho
- List of city nicknames in Illinois
- List of city nicknames in Indiana
- List of city nicknames in Iowa
- List of city nicknames in Kansas
- List of city nicknames in Kentucky
- List of city nicknames in Louisiana
- List of city nicknames in Maine
- List of city nicknames in Maryland
- List of city nicknames in Massachusetts
- List of city nicknames in Michigan
- List of city nicknames in Minnesota
- List of city nicknames in Mississippi
- List of city nicknames in Missouri
- List of city nicknames in Montana
- List of city nicknames in Nebraska
- List of city nicknames in Nevada
- List of city nicknames in New Hampshire
- List of city nicknames in New Jersey
- List of city nicknames in New Mexico
- List of city nicknames in New York
- List of city nicknames in North Carolina
- List of city nicknames in North Dakota
- List of city nicknames in Ohio
- List of city nicknames in Oklahoma
- List of city nicknames in Oregon
- List of city nicknames in Pennsylvania
- List of city nicknames in Puerto Rico
- List of city nicknames in Rhode Island
- List of city nicknames in South Carolina
- List of city nicknames in South Dakota
- List of city nicknames in Tennessee
- List of city nicknames in Texas
- List of city nicknames in Utah
- List of city nicknames in Vermont
- List of city nicknames in Virginia
- List of city nicknames in Washington
- List of city nicknames in West Virginia
- List of city nicknames in Wisconsin
- List of city nicknames in Wyoming

== Military nicknames ==
- List of military figures by nickname
- List of warships by nickname
- List of nicknames of British Army regiments
- Regimental nicknames of the Canadian Forces
- Nicknames of United States Army divisions

== Sports nicknames ==
- Australian national sports team nicknames
- List of baseball nicknames
- List of baseball team nicknames
- List of basketball nicknames
- List of college team nicknames in the United States
- List of ice hockey nicknames
- List of ice hockey line nicknames
- List of national association football teams by nickname
- List of NFL nicknames
- List of nicknamed NFL games and plays
- List of nicknames in motorsport
- List of nicknames used in basketball
- List of nicknames used in cricket
- List of nicknames used in tennis
- List of North American football nicknames
- List of Philippine college team nicknames
- List of sportspeople by nickname

== See also ==
- List of adjectival and demonymic forms of place names
- Athletic nickname
- List of demonyms for U.S. states
- List of people known as The Great
- List of scandals with "-gate" suffix
- List of stage names
- List of lists of lists
