= Nicknames of Pittsburgh =

Slang terms for the city in Pennsylvania, United States

There are many nicknames for the city of Pittsburgh, Pennsylvania.

== Major nicknames ==
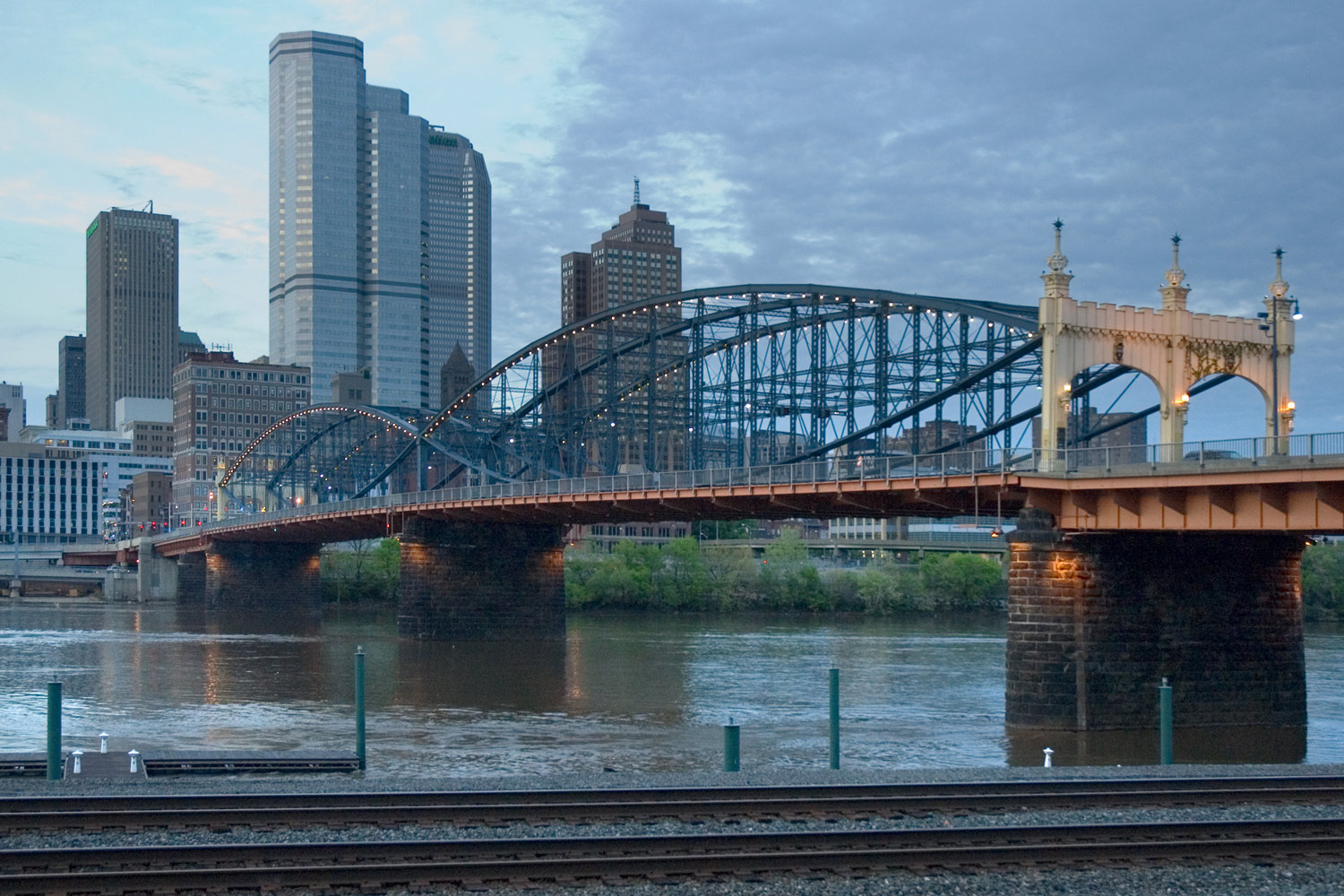
"The City of Bridges"

- City of Bridges
  - Pittsburgh boasts more bridges, owing to its location at the confluence of the Allegheny, Ohio, and Monongahela rivers, than any other city or region in the world.
- Steel City
  - Pittsburgh and the surrounding area was once one of the largest steel producers in the world, gaining it international renown as such. The U.S. Steel Tower remains the headquarters for that company.
- River City
  - For the three rivers that confine Pittsburgh and the vital role they played in establishing the city and its flourishing.
- The 'Burgh
  - Unlike many cities in America that end in burg (including the capital of the state, Harrisburg), Pittsburgh retains the h at the end of its name, making this quality recognizable as unique to the city.
- Dirty 'Burgh
  - Pittsburgh and the surrounding area was once one of the largest producers of steel in the world. Due to the pollution caused by the steel industry, the haze was so dark that downtown streets were lined with bright streetlamps at ten in the morning.
- City of Champions
  - Pittsburgh has enjoyed numerous sports championships from its three major league sports teams and the athletic programs at its many universities.
- Gateway to the West
  - Much early western migration started in Pittsburgh. Lewis and Clark expedition started there after their boats were constructed near Pittsburgh.
- Hell with the Lid Off
  - Boston writer James Parton described Pittsburgh as "hell with the lid off" in 1868. This was because of the smoke, smog, and fire that were prevalent during the city's steelmaking heyday.

== Minor nicknames ==
- Iron City
- The Smoky City / The Smoking City
  - Due to the smoke produced by the iron and steel industry in and around Pittsburgh, the city constantly looked smoky.
- Paris of Appalachia
  - Pittsburgh is the largest metropolitan area in the entire Appalachian region.

- Sixburgh
  - This is a reference to the six Super Bowls that the Pittsburgh Steelers won.
- Blitzburgh
  - Used by fans of Pittsburgh sports teams; in particular the Pittsburgh Steelers. Named for the 3-4 zone blitz.
- The 412
  - 412 is the telephone area code for much of Allegheny County, though it covered much more geographically at the time the name was coined, prior to the introduction of 724. Both 412 and 724 are now part of an overlay complex in which the entire region served by those codes is also covered by 878.
- The Only City with an Entrance
  - Traveling through the Fort Pitt Tunnel or Liberty Tunnels under Mount Washington yields, for many travelers, the first glimpse of the city's skyline.
- Capital of/Largest City in West Virginia
  - So called because many West Virginians migrate to Pittsburgh.
- Benigno Numine
  - Comes from the city's Latin motto. It is generally translated as "With the Benevolent Deity" or "By the Favour of Heaven".
- The Pitt
  - Sometimes shortened to such, possibly for the hilly topography surrounding the city. Also used to refer to the University of Pittsburgh.

== See also ==
- List of city nicknames in Pennsylvania
- Name of Pittsburgh
- Nicknames of Philadelphia
- Nicknames of Cleveland
