= Nicknames of Vancouver =

Slang terms for the city in British Columbia, Canada

There are many nicknames for the city of Vancouver, the largest city in British Columbia and third-largest metropolitan area in Canada. Some reflect the city's history, climate, geography, economy, and demographics. Others have their origins in cultural aspects of the city and its inhabitants.

== History ==
The first non-aboriginal settlement in the area was known as Gastown. This name continues today as a nickname for Vancouver, although more specifically for the original core of the city, which is part of the Downtown Eastside.

== Geography and climate ==
- Rain City (or Raincouver or the Wet Coast) – Vancouver receives on average 1,199 mm (47.2 in) of rainfall a year (YVR). Especially during the winter months, the city has a reputation for wet weather.
- Terminal City – refers to Vancouver (or specifically Gastown) being the western terminus of the Canadian Pacific Railway.
- Saltwater City (Chinese: 鹹水埠) – name for Vancouver used by early Chinese immigrants to the city.

== Industry ==
- Hollywood North – the city is home to the third-largest film and television production industry in North America, after LA and New York.
- The Big Smoke – Vancouver's heavy fogs in combination with the many sawmill burners and other industrial pollution produced thick smog. Common as slang and in casual usage. It is also used outside of BC for Toronto, London, Sydney and other places. Very common in use within BC, especially in the BC Interior, for both Vancouver and the Lower Mainland in general.

== Culture ==
- Vansterdam – like Amsterdam, Vancouver has a reputation for relaxed attitudes towards recreational drug use, specifically marijuana.
- Lotusland – coined by Vancouver Sun writer Allan Fotheringham, Lotusland refers to Homer's Odyssey, in which the hero, Odysseus, visits a land whose inhabitants are befuddled by a narcotic lotus (the "Land of the Lotus-Eaters"). It sometimes is used to describe all of British Columbia.
- City of Glass – taken from the title of a Douglas Coupland book, this name reflects the dominant steel-and-glass architectural aesthetic of the city's downtown.
- No Fun City (or Nofuncouver) – long-time nickname which can refer to a variety of things depending on use and context. It can refer to some of the city's cultural policies that result in a less lively local music scene, to a perceived "lame" nightlife.
- Blandcouver – similar to 'No Fun City,' this nickname is often used self-deprecatingly by locals who think Vancouver's cosmopolitanism is over-hyped.
- The 604 – 604 is an area code used in Vancouver that locals occasionally use as slang for Vancouver.
- The City of Neighbourhoods – Because of the variety of its communities, Vancouver has often been termed a City of Neighbourhoods.

== Demographics ==
- Hongcouver and Vankong – names with xenophobic connotations, it came into use in the 1980s and 1990s. Although Vancouver has had a large Chinese community from its earliest days, the Chinese population surged as large numbers of Hong Kong citizens immigrated prior to the British handover of that city in 1997.

== Diminutives ==
- Downtown – common inside of BC to refer to the whole of actual Vancouver
- The V – contemporary moniker originating in the Canadian hip hop community
- Van – common outside the city proper and as an abbreviation
- V-town – virtually unused in BC, but in moderate use within Alberta
- East Van – not common outside of BC, but most residents of East Vancouver use this
- Vancity – originated in the Canadian hip hop community, has since come into popular usage in and outside of BC (Vancity is also the name of a local credit union)

== See also ==
- List of city nicknames in Canada
- Lists of nicknames – nickname list articles on Wikipedia
- Left coast
