= Nicknames of Philadelphia =

Terms for the city in Pennsylvania in the United States

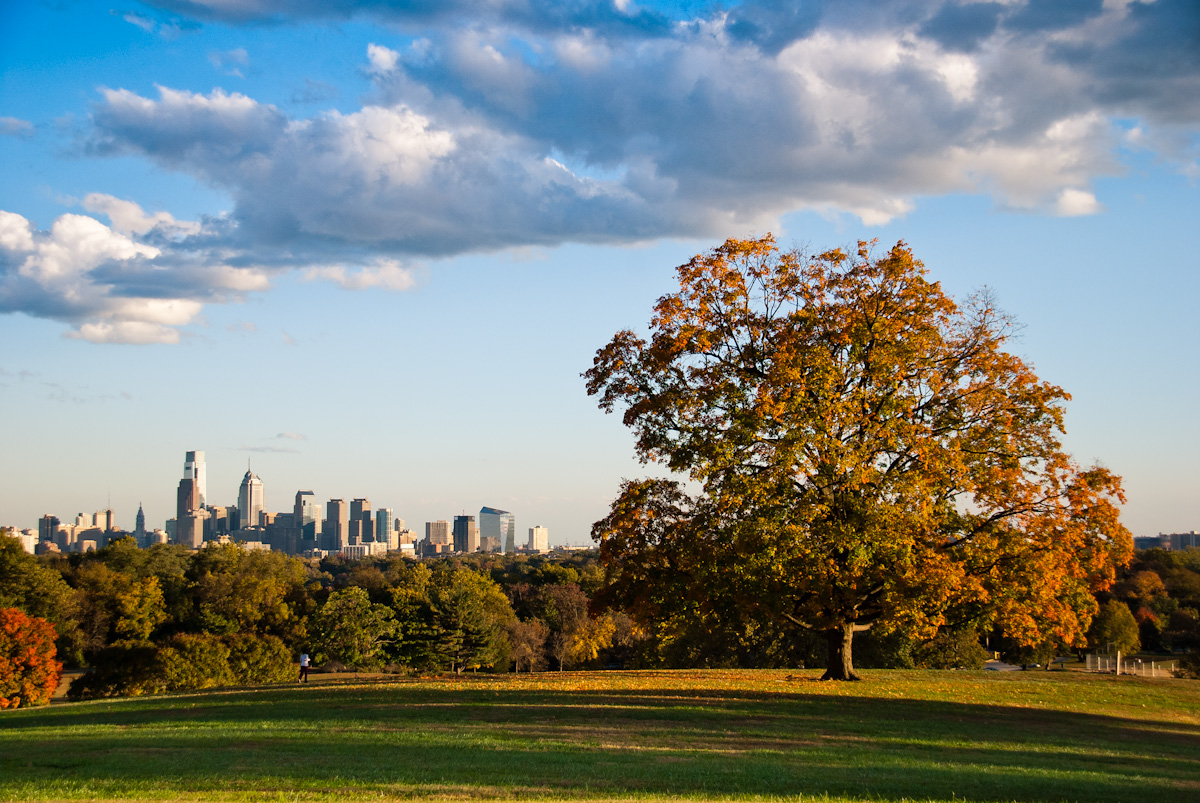
Philadelphia skyline as seen from Belmont Plateau, in Fairmount Park

Philadelphia has long been nicknamed "The City of Brotherly Love" from the literal meaning of the city's name in Greek (Greek: Φιλαδέλφεια ([pʰilaˈdelpʰeːa], Modern Greek: [filaˈðelfia]), "brotherly love"), derived from the Ancient Greek terms φίλος phílos (beloved, dear, or loving) and ἀδελφός adelphós (brother, brotherly). The city was first named by its founder, William Penn.

"Philadelphia" is also frequently shortened to "Philly" (/fɪli/). The Philadelphia Phillies, the city's baseball team, officially formed in 1883.

== Other nicknames ==
- "America’s Garden Capital" — in reference to Philadelphia’s more than 30 gardens and the pride taken by Philadelphians in their gardens
- "The Athens of America" — so called as early as 1733 by the directors of the Library Company of Philadelphia. Gilbert Stuart referred to the city using this phrase, referring to Philadelphia's reputation for science, industry, art, and intellectual life. Also a nickname of Boston
- "The Birthplace of America" — derived from Philadelphia's role in the American Revolution and location of the signing of the Declaration of Independence and Constitution
- “Cellicon Valley” — in reference to Philadelphia’s central role in the development of immunotherapies to treat different cancers
- "The Cradle of Liberty" — derives from Philadelphia's role in the American Revolution. Also a nickname of Boston
- "The Quaker City" — was given in reference to the religion of the city's early settlers.
- "The Workshop of the World" — Philadelphia's Industrial Revolution history gave it this nickname; in the pre-World War II 20th century, Philadelphia "led the nation in production of such diverse products as locomotives, streetcars, saws, steel ships, textiles, rugs, hosiery, hats, leather, and cigars. It held second place in the production of sugar, fertilizer, foundry castings, petroleum, products, chemicals, and pharmaceuticals."
- "The City that Loves you Back" — this slogan was introduced by the Greater Philadelphia Tourism Marketing Corporation (GPTMC) in a 1997 advertising campaign. The motto was both "a reply and a challenge to the 'I Love New York' slogan" and countered the "antisocial reputation" that Philadelphia had developed.
- "The City of Neighborhoods" — unclear how this name emerged; Philadelphia was called "The City of Homes" by the 1870s, and was called "a city of residences" in a book published in 1893, referencing the city's high levels of home ownership. The nicknamed refers to the city's many distinct neighborhoods and sense of neighborhood pride.
- "The City That Bombed Itself" — In 1985, Philadelphia police bombed a rowhouse occupied by MOVE, a radical black-power group. The bombing killed 11 people, destroyed 61 homes, left 250 people homeless, and earned the city this title.
- "Filthadelphia" or "Filthydelphia" — an epithet used by Philadelphians as far back as the 1910s to complain about the omnipresent trash on the streets and the failure of the city to fix the problem
- "Killadelphia" — a reference to a history of violent crime and homicide rates
- "Petrodelphia" — a reference to the historic importance of the city as a refining and distribution center for petroleum and other fossil fuels
- "The Sixth Borough" — a term used by New Yorkers, not Philadelphians, given Philadelphia's close proximity to New York City and the movement of New Yorkers to Philadelphia for less expensive rents, real estate, and cost of living

== See also ==
- List of city nicknames in Pennsylvania
- Nicknames of Boston
- Nicknames of New York City
- Nicknames of Pittsburgh
