= List of city and town nicknames in New Zealand =

Many of New Zealand's cities and towns are known by various aliases, slogans, sobriquets, and other nicknames to the general population at either the local, regional, national or international level, often due to marketing campaigns and widespread usage in the media. Some nicknames are officially adopted by municipal governments, tourism boards or chambers of commerce while others are unofficial, and some are current while others are antiquated. Some nicknames are positive, while others are derisive, disparaging or derogatory.

City nicknames can help establish a civic identity, promote civic pride, build civic unity, market the community, and attract residents and businesses. They are also believed to have economic value, but their economic value is difficult to measure.

== List of nicknames by city or town ==
- Alexandra
  - "Alex"
- Auckland
  - "Big Little City"
  - "The City of Sails"
  - "The Queen City"
  - "The AK"
  - "The Big Smoke"
- Balclutha
  - "Big River Town"
- Christchurch
  - "The Garden City"
  - "The Most English City Outside England"
  - "The Four Avenues"
  - "Cyclopolis"
- Dargaville
  - Kumara Capital
- Dunedin
  - "A pretty good Plan D"
  - "Dunners"
  - "Edinburgh of the South"
- Gisborne
  - "Gizzy"
- Hamilton
  - "The City of the Future"
  - "The Tron"
- Hokitika
  - "Capital of pounamu"
  - "Cool little town"
- Invercargill
  - "City of Water and Light"
  - "Invers"
- Mosgiel
  - "Pearl of the Plain"
- Napier
  - "Art Deco Capital (of New Zealand/the World)"
- Naseby
  - "2000ft Above Worry Level"
- Oamaru
  - "Steampunk capital (of New Zealand/the World)"
  - "Whitestone City"
- Palmerston North
  - "Palmy"
- Paraparaumu
  - "Pram"
  - "Paraparam"
- Porirua
  - "P-Town"
- Queenstown
  - "Adventure Capital (of New Zealand/the World)"
- Rangiora
  - "Goon"
- Riverton / Aparima
  - "Riviera of the South"
- Rolleston
  - "Town of the Future"
- Rotorua
  - "Sulphur City"
  - "Rotovegas"
- Taihape
  - "Gumboot Capital of the World"
- Tauranga
  - "The Mount"
- Tuatapere
  - "New Zealand's Sausage Capital"
- Te Anau
  - "Gateway to Fiordland"
- Timaru
  - "Timmers"
- Wellington
  - "Absolutely Positively Wellington"
  - "Welly"
  - "Wellywood"
  - "The Windy City"
- Whanganui
  - "River City"
- Woodville
  - "All Good in the Wood"

== See also ==
- List of city nicknames in Canada
- List of city nicknames in the United Kingdom
- List of city nicknames in the United States
- Lists of nicknames – nickname list articles on Wikipedia

== Notes ==
1. "The Mount" usually more specifically relates to Mount Maunganui, a large town and promontory on the edge of Tauranga Harbour and within the Tauranga urban area.
