= List of nicknames of German politicians =

This is a list of nicknames of German politicians. Only a few have widely known nicknames (in German: Spitzname). Most notable politicians who have had popular nicknames were chancellors or high-ranking party leaders in Germany's major political parties of the past (CDU, SPD, etc.).

Distortions or mocking variations of a person's name, such as ‘What-a-fool’ or ‘Pistolius’ were not taken into account.

== Nicknames ==
The nicknames are given in the German original with a rough English translation:

- „der Alte“ (the Old One), Konrad Adenauer (1876–1967) (CDU), the first Chancellor (1949–1963) of the Federal Republic of Germany.
- „Birne“ (the Pear) – Helmut Kohl (CDU) – a well-known mocking nickname, popularized by cartoons, referring to Kohl's head shape.
- „Bomber-Joschka“ (Bomber Joschka), Joschka Fischer (Alliance 90/The Greens), because of his support for the NATO bombing of Yugoslavia during the Kosovo War, which violated international law and caused thousands of deaths (cf. „Bomber Harris“).
- „Eurofighter“ (Eurofighter) – Marie-Agnes Strack-Zimmermann (FDP), Member of the European Parliament – because of her commitment to (new) German military readiness.
- „Flinten-Uschi” (Shotgun Uschi), a nickname for Ursula von der Leyen (CDU), originated during her time as Germany's Federal Minister of Defense (2013–2019), refers to her position at the head of the Bundeswehr.
- „Gas-Gerd“ (Gas Gerd) – Gerhard Schröder (SPD) – often in reference to energy policy or the economy (connected with Russia).
- „Mutti“ (Mom) – Angela Merkel (CDU) – referring to her hairstyle or her down-to-earth, pragmatic style.
- „Muttis Klügster“ (Mom's Smartest) – Norbert Röttgen (CDU) – due to his know-it-all secondary role alongside Chancellor Angela Merkel.
- „Panzer-Toni” (Tank Toni) - Anton Hofreiter (Alliance 90/The Greens), because of his strong public advocacy for supplying weapons to Ukraine, especially heavy weapons such as battle tanks.
- "Lying face" emoji
  „Pinocchio“ (Pinocchio) – Friedrich Merz (CDU) – after the famous fictional character by Carlo Collodi whose nose grows when lying; so called because of breaking election promises, especially regarding new debt.
- „Plisch und Plum“ (Plisch and Plum) – Karl Schiller (SPD) (Minister of Economics) and Franz-Josef Strauß (CSU) (Minister of Finance).
- „Schmidt-Schnauze“ (Schmidt-snout) - Helmut Schmidt (SPD), because of his ready wit.
- „Scholzomat“ (Scholz-o-mat) – Olaf Scholz (SPD) – because of his often technocratical style.
- „Tonne“ (the Barrel) – Sigmar Gabriel (SPD) – because of his robust appearance.
- „Willy“ (Willy) – Willy Brandt (SPD) – very popular, a friendly nickname.

== See also ==
- Lists of nicknames – nickname list articles on Wikipedia
