= List of city nicknames in Spain =

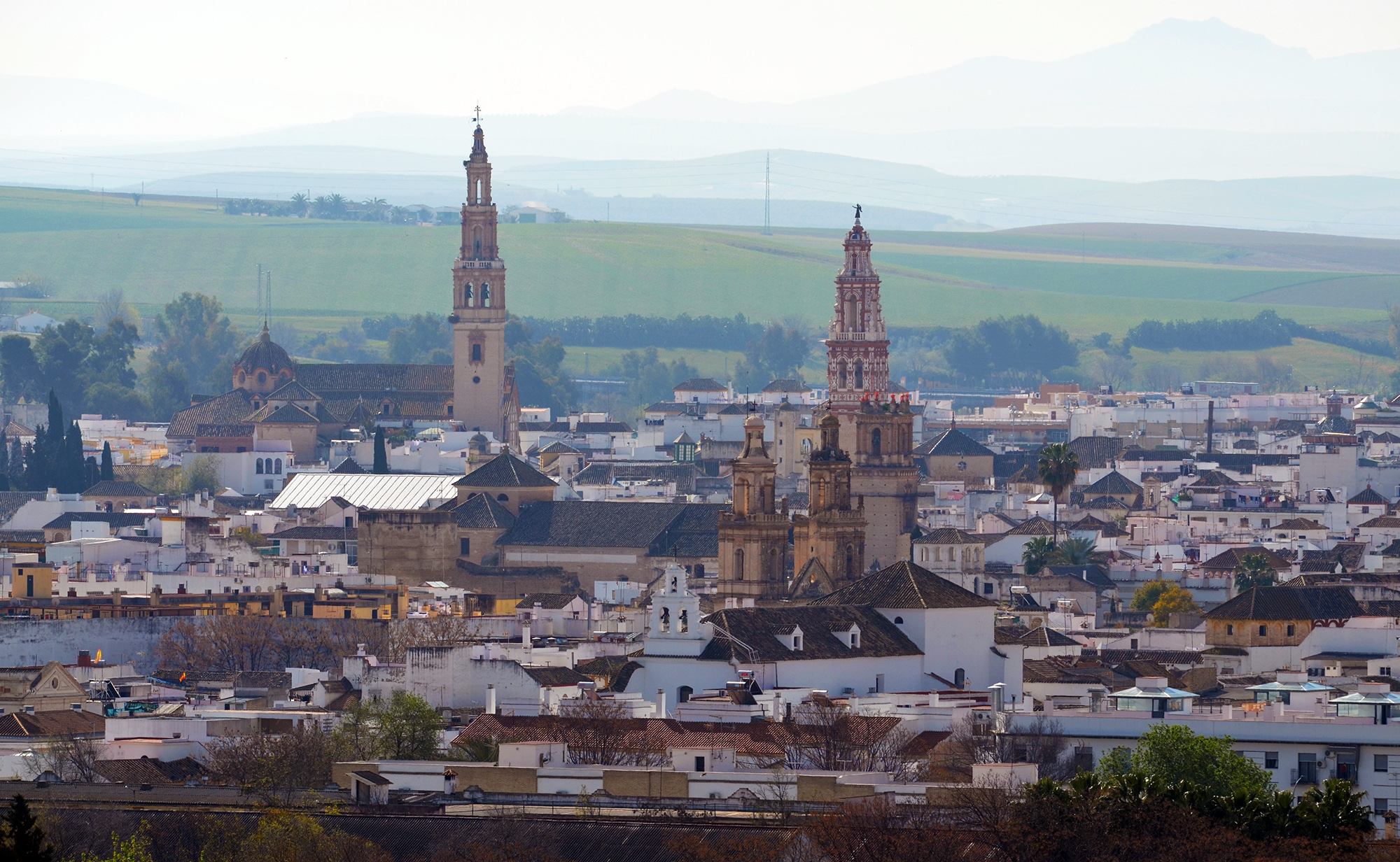
Écija's skyline, dating back to the 18th century, is shaped by its towers. Hence the name la ciudad de las torres.

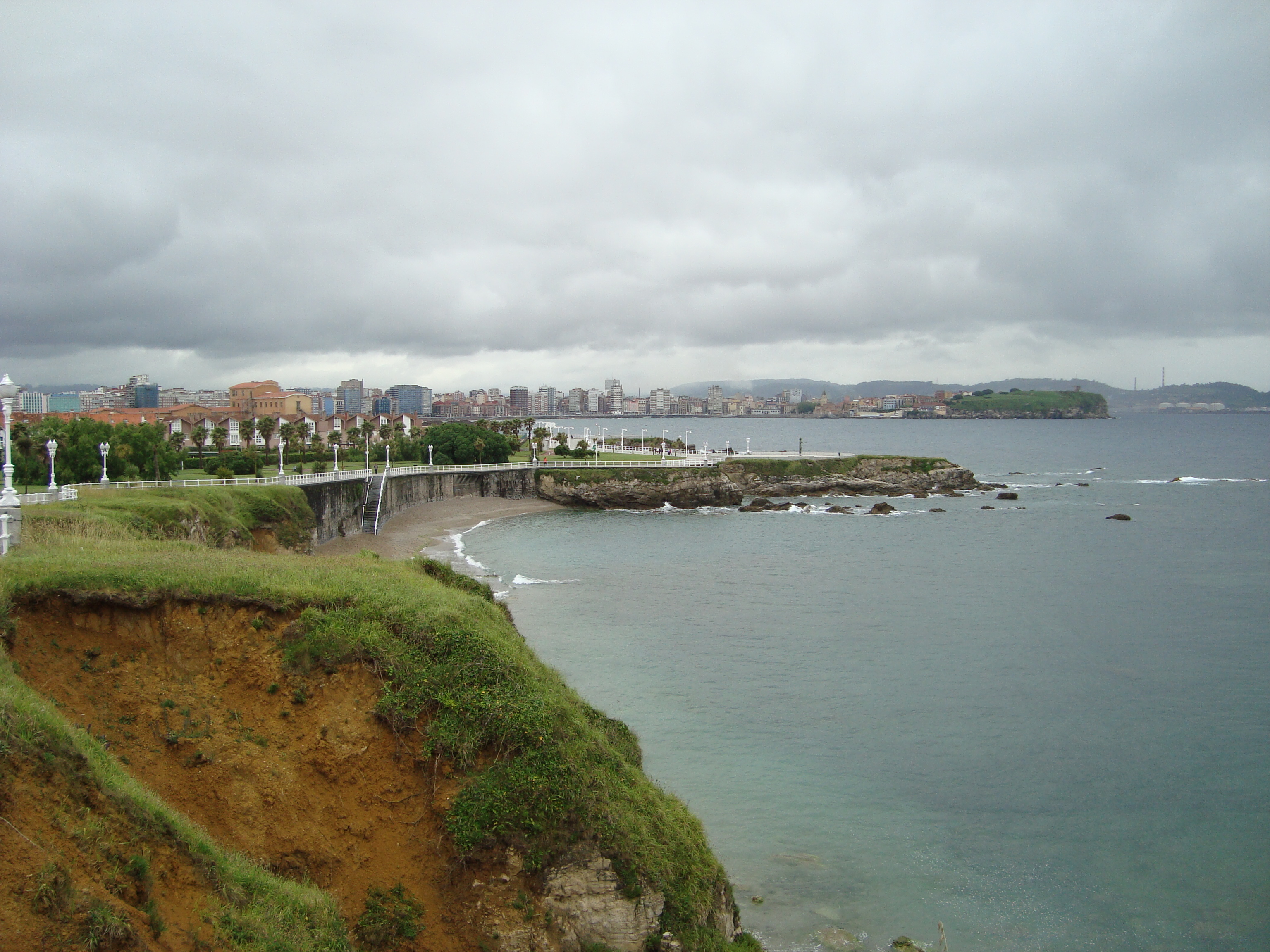
The "Green Coast" became an official name for the coasts of Gijón and Avilés in 1969. As the major city in the area, Gijón is known as the "capital of the green coast".

Many cities and towns in Spain are popularly known by various nicknames. This list compiles the aliases, sobriquets and slogans that cities in Spain are known by (or have been known by historically), officially and unofficially.

== List ==
- Almería: espejo del mar (The Mirror of the Sea")
- Avilés: la villa del adelantado (The Town of the Adelantado)
- Barakaldo: la localidad fabril ("Factory Town")
- Barcelona: la ciudad condal (The City of Counts)
- Bilbao: el bocho (The Hole)
- Cádiz: la tacita de plata (The Little Silver Cup)
- La Coruña: el balcón del Atlántico (The Balcony over the Atlantic), la ciudad de cristal (Crystal City)
- Écija: la sartén de Andalucía (The Frying Pan of Andalusia), la ciudad de las torres (Tower City), la ciudad del sol (Sun City)
- Eibar: la villa armera ("Weapon Town")
- Gijón: la capital de la Costa Verde (The Capital of the Green Coast)
- Madrid: villa y corte (Town and Court), el foro ("The forum")
- Ourense: a caldeira de Galiza (Galician for The Cauldron of Galicia)
- Pontevedra: a boa vila (Galician for "The Good Town")
- San Sebastián: la bella Easo (The Beautiful Easo), la perla del Cantábrico (The Pearl of the Cantabrian)
- Toledo: la ciudad imperial (Imperial City), la ciudad de las tres culturas (The City of the Three Cultures)
- Valdepeñas: la ciudad del vino (City of Wine)
- Valencia: la capital del Turia (The Capital of the Turia), cap i casal (Valencian for "Head and House")
- Vigo: la ciudad olívica (Olive City)

== See also ==
- Lists of city nicknames
