= List of city nicknames in Tennessee =

This partial list of city nicknames in Tennessee compiles the aliases, sobriquets and slogans that cities and towns in Tennessee are known by (or have been known by historically), officially and unofficially, to municipal governments, local people, outsiders or their tourism boards or chambers of commerce. City nicknames can help in establishing a civic identity, helping outsiders recognize a community or attracting people to a community because of its nickname; promote civic pride; and build community unity. Nicknames and slogans that successfully create a new community "ideology or myth" are also believed to have economic value. Their economic value is difficult to measure, but there are anecdotal reports of cities that have achieved substantial economic benefits by "branding" themselves by adopting new slogans.

Some unofficial nicknames are positive, while others are derisive. The unofficial nicknames listed here have been in use for a long time or have gained wide currency.

- Adamsville – The Biggest Little Town in Tennessee
- Athens – The Friendly City
- Bristol – The Birthplace of Country Music (shares this nickname with Bristol, Virginia)
- Chattanooga
  - Dynamo of Dixie
  - The Scenic City
  - City of Lights
  - Gateway to the South
- Clarksville
  - Gateway to the New South
  - The Queen City or Queen of the Cumberland
  - Tennessee's Top Spot (introduced as a new city "brand" in April 2008)
- Cleveland- The City with Spirit
- Columbia – Mule Capital of the World
- Elizabethton – City of Power'
- Gleason - Tater Town
- Greeneville – Home of President Andrew Johnson
- Jackson - Hub City
- Johnson City – Little Chicago of the South
- Jonesborough – Tennessee's Oldest Town
- Kenton – Home of the White Squirrels.
- Kingsport – The Model City
- Knoxville
  - The Marble City
  - Underwear Capital of the World
- Lebanon – Appalachian Square Dance Capital of the World
- Lenoir City – Lakeway to the Smokies
- McMinnville – Nursery Capital of the World
- Memphis
  - Barbecued Pork Capital of the World
  - Home of the Blues.
  - Bluff City
  - Birthplace of Rock 'n Roll
- Murfreesboro
  - The Bucket City
  - The Boro
  - Geographic Center of TN
  - Center of the Universe
  - Murf-Terf
- Nashville
  - Little Kurdistan
  - The Athens of the South
  - City of Rocks (reported in the 1880s)
  - Minneapolis of the South (historical)
  - Music City
  - The Protestant Vatican
  - Smashville
  - Cashville
- Oak Ridge
  - America's Secret City
  - The Atomic City
- Shelbyville
  - Pencil City
  - Walking Horse Capital of the World
- Wartrace – Cradle of the Tennessee Walking Horse.

== See also ==
- List of city nicknames in the United States
- List of municipalities in Tennessee
