= List of city nicknames in New Hampshire =

This partial list of city nicknames in New Hampshire compiles the aliases, sobriquets and slogans that cities and towns in New Hampshire are known by (or have been known by historically), officially and unofficially, to municipal governments, local people, outsiders or their tourism boards or chambers of commerce. City nicknames can help in establishing a civic identity, helping outsiders recognize a community or attracting people to a community because of its nickname; promote civic pride; and build community unity. Nicknames and slogans that successfully create a new community "ideology or myth" are also believed to have economic value. Their economic value is difficult to measure, but there are anecdotal reports of cities that have achieved substantial economic benefits by "branding" themselves by adopting new slogans.

Some unofficial nicknames are positive, while others are derisive. The unofficial nicknames listed here have been in use for a long time or have gained wide currency.

- Berlin – The City That Trees Built.
- Concord
  - The Capital City.
  - New Hampshire's Main Street™.
- Derry – Space Town.
- Dover – The Garrison City.
- Keene – Elm City.
- Manchester
  - ManchVegas.
  - Queen City.
- Meredith – Latchkey to the White Mountains.
- Milford – Granite Town.
- Nashua – The Gate City.
- Peterborough – Our Town, named for the Thornton Wilder play written in and inspired by the village.
- Rochester – Lilac City.
- Rumney – Crutch Capital of the World.
- Salem – Gateway to New Hampshire.

== See also ==
- List of city nicknames in the United States
