= List of city nicknames in Minnesota =

This partial list of city nicknames in Minnesota compiles the aliases, sobriquets and slogans that cities in Minnesota are known by (or have been known by historically), officially and unofficially, to municipal governments, local people, outsiders or their tourism boards or chambers of commerce. City nicknames can help in establishing a civic identity, helping outsiders recognize a community or attracting people to a community because of its nickname; promote civic pride; and build community unity. Nicknames and slogans that successfully create a new community "ideology or myth" are also believed to have economic value. Their economic value is difficult to measure, but there are anecdotal reports of cities that have achieved substantial economic benefits by "branding" themselves by adopting new slogans.

Some unofficial nicknames are positive, while others are derisive. The unofficial nicknames listed here have been in use for a long time or have gained wide currency.

- Anoka – Halloween Capital of the World
- Albert Lea – The Land Between the Lakes
- Austin – Spamtown USA
- Bemidji – First City on the Mississippi
- Braham – Homemade Pie Capital of Minnesota
- Duluth
  - The Zenith City
  - The Twin Ports (with Superior, Wisconsin)
- Elk River – Where City and Country Flow Together
- Hanover – The Little City on the Crow
- Hermantown – The City of Quality Living
- International Falls – The Icebox of the United States
- Lake Benton – Windpower Capital
- Madison – Lutefisk Capital of the World
- Minneapolis
  - City of Flour and Sawdust (reported in 1883)
  - City of Lakes
  - Mill City
  - The Mini Apple
  - Murderapolis
  - The Twin Cities (with St. Paul)
- Montgomery – Kolacky Capital of the World
- Morris – Motown
- Mountain Iron – Taconite Capital of the World
- New Ulm – The City of Charm and Tradition
- Northfield – Cows, Colleges and Contentment
- Preston – America's Trout Capital
- Richfield – Poorfield
- Robbinsdale – Birdtown
- Rochester – Med City
- St. Cloud – Granite City
- St. Louis Park – St. Jewish Park
- Saint Paul
  - Pigs Eye (the city's original name – see Pierre "Pig's Eye" Parrant for details)
  - Hockeytown
  - Saintly City
  - The Twin Cities (with Minneapolis)
- Stillwater – The Birthplace of Minnesota
- Warroad – Hockeytown
- Worthington – Turkey Capital of the World

== See also ==
- List of city nicknames in the United States
