= List of city nicknames in South Dakota =

This partial list of city nicknames in South Dakota compiles the aliases, sobriquets and slogans that cities and towns in South Dakota are known by (or have been known by historically), officially and unofficially, to municipal governments, local people, outsiders or their tourism boards or chambers of commerce. City nicknames can help in establishing a civic identity, helping outsiders recognize a community or attracting people to a community because of its nickname; promote civic pride; and build community unity. Nicknames and slogans that successfully create a new community "ideology or myth" are also believed to have economic value. Their economic value is difficult to measure, but there are anecdotal reports of cities that have achieved substantial economic benefits by "branding" themselves and adopting new slogans.

Some unofficial nicknames are positive, while others are derisive. The unofficial nicknames listed here have been in use for a long time or have gained wide currency.

- Aberdeen
  - The Hub City
  - The Town in the Frog Pond
- Clark – Potato Capital of South Dakota
- Fort Thompson – Paddlefish Capital of the World
- Leola – Rhubarb Capital of the World
- Rapid City
  - The Gateway to the Black Hills
  - Real America Up Close
  - Star of the West
- Redfield – Pheasant Capital of the World
- Sioux Falls – Gateway to the Plains
- Spearfish, South Dakota – The Queen City
- Watertown – South Dakota's Rising Star

== See also ==
- List of city nicknames in the United States
