= List of city nicknames in China =

This partial list of city nicknames in China compiles the aliases, sobriquets and slogans that cities in China are known by (or have been known by historically), officially and unofficially, to locals, outsiders or their tourism boards or chambers of commerce.

== List ==
City	Province	English slogan	Chinese (simp)	Chinese (trad)	pinyin	source
Yichun	Jiangxi	A City Called Spring	一座叫春的城市	一座叫春的城市	Yīzuò jiào chūnde chéngshì	
Beijing	(none)	Patriotism, Innovation, Inclusiveness and Virtue	爱国、创新、包容、厚德	愛國、創新、包容、厚德	àiguó, chuàngxīn, bāoróng, hòudé	
Shanghai	(none)	Wonderful everyday	精彩每一天	精彩每一天	Jīngcǎi měiyītiān	
Chongqing	(none)	Red City	红色之都	紅色之都	Hóngsè zhī dū	
Chongqing	(none)	If you've never been to Chongqing, you don't know China	没到过重庆，不了解中国	沒到過重慶，不了解中國	Méi dàoguò Chóngqìng, bù liǎojiě Zhōngguó	
Chongqing	(none)	World's Chongqing, Everlasting Three Gorges	世界的重庆 永远的三峡	世界的重慶 永遠的三峽	Shìjiède Chóngqìng, yǒngyuǎnde Sānxiá	
Rizhao	Shandong	Blue skies, Emerald seas, Golden beaches	蓝天碧海金沙滩	藍天碧海金沙灘	Lántiān bìhǎi jīnshātān	
Kunming	Yunnan	Every day is Spring	昆明天天是春天	昆明天天是春天	Kūnmíng tiāntiān shì chūntiān	
Guangzhou	Guangdong	In one day you understand two thousand years	一日读懂两千年	一日讀懂兩千年	Yīrì dúdǒng liǎngqiān nián	
Chengdu	Sichuan	Capital of success, Capital of color, Capital of cuisine	成功之都、多彩之都、美食之都	成功之都、多彩之都、美食之都	Chénggōng zhī dū, Duōcǎi zhī dū, Měishí zhī dū	
Dongguan	Guangdong	Let fresh splendor blossom every day!	每天绽放 新精彩！	每天綻放 新精彩！	Měitiān zhànfàng xīn jīngcǎi!	
Ningbo	Zhejiang	Honest, Pragmatic, Open-minded, Innovative	诚信、 务实、开放、创新	誠信、 務實、開放、創新	Chéngxìn, wùshí, kāifàng, chuàngxīn	
Hangzhou	Zhejiang	Exquisite and harmonious, magnanimous and open-minded	精致和谐、 大气开放	精緻和諧、 大氣開放	Jīngzhì héxié, dàqì kāifàng	

Additionally, several city governments have promoted the name "Oriental Geneva" (simplified Chinese: 东方日内瓦; traditional Chinese: 東方日內瓦; pinyin: Dōngfāng Rìnèiwǎ) for themselves. These cities include Shijiazhuang and Qinhuangdao in Hebei, Zhaoqing in Guangdong, Kunming and Dali in Yunnan, Chaohu in Anhui, and Wuxi in Jiangsu.
