= List of city nicknames in Azerbaijan =

This list of city nicknames in Azerbaijan compiles the aliases, sobriquets, and slogans by which cities in the country are known or have been known historically. These nicknames may be official or unofficial and are used by municipal authorities, local residents, visitors, or tourism boards.

City nicknames can help establish a civic identity, enabling outsiders to recognise a community or attracting people through its nickname. They may also promote civic pride and contribute to community cohesion and unity.

== A ==
- Aghdam
  - "Azerbaijan's ghost town" due to its complete abandonment following the Nagorno-Karabakh conflict.
  - "The Hiroshima of the Caucasus" due to its near-total destruction during the First Nagorno-Karabakh War.

== B ==
- Baku
  - "Dubai of the Caucasus" due to its rapid urban development, modern skyline, and booming oil wealth.
  - "Paris of the East" due to the opulent European-style architecture, particularly French-inspired neoclassical buildings, constructed during its 19th-century oil boom, creating a blend with its ancient Old City and modern skyscrapers, evoking a mix of old-world charm and contemporary elegance, like Paris.
  - "The City of Winds" (Azerbaijani: Küləklər şəhəri)

== M ==
- Mingachevir
  - "The City of Energy Workers" (Azerbaijani: Energetiklər şəhəri) due to its role as a major center of energy production in Azerbaijan.

== S ==
- Shusha
  - "The Conservatory of the Caucasus" (Azerbaijani: Qafqazın konservatoriyası) due to its rich musical heritage.
  - "The Cultural Capital of Azerbaijan" due to the city's historic significance in the arts, music, and literature.
- Sumgayit
  - "The City of Chemists" (Azerbaijani: Kimyaçılar şəhəri) due to its long-standing role as an industrial and chemical production hub in Azerbaijan.
