= List of city nicknames in North Carolina =

This partial list of city nicknames in North Carolina compiles the aliases, sobriquets and slogans that cities in North Carolina are known by (or have been known by historically), officially and unofficially, to municipal governments, local people, outsiders or their tourism boards or chambers of commerce. City nicknames can help in establishing a civic identity, helping outsiders recognize a community or attracting people to a community because of its nickname; promote civic pride; and build community unity. Nicknames and slogans that successfully create a new community "ideology or myth" are also believed to have economic value. Their economic value is difficult to measure, but there are anecdotal reports of cities that have achieved substantial economic benefits by "branding" themselves by adopting new slogans.

Some unofficial nicknames are positive, while others are derisive, divisive or just downright negative. The unofficial nicknames listed here have been in use for a long time or have gained wide currency.

- Apex
  - Peak of Good Living
- Asheboro
  - A-Town
  - A-Boro
  - Zoo City
- Asheville
  - San Francisco of the South
  - AVL
  - Beer City
- Boone
  - Firefly Capital of the World
- Brevard
  - Home of the white squirrels
- Burlington
  - B-Town
  - The Buck
  - Bucktown
  - Burvegas
- Calabash
  - Seafood Capital of the World
- Cape Hatteras
  - The Graveyard of the Atlantic
- Carolina Beach
  - C.B.
- Carrboro
  - Paris of the Piedmont
- Cary
  - Containment Area for Relocated Yankees
- Chadbourn
  - Strawberry Capital of the World
- Chapel Hill
  - The Southern Part of Heaven
- Charlotte
  - Queen City
  - Mint City
  - The Hornet's Nest
  - City of Trees
  - Buzz City
- Durham
  - City of Medicine
  - City of The Viper
  - Bull City
- Erwin
  - Denim Capital of the World
- Fayetteville
  - All-American City
  - City of Dogwoods
  - Fayettenam
  - The Ville
  - 2-6
  - Fay-Raq
  - Tar Heel Town
  - Torture Town
  - The Soldier City
- Gastonia
  - Spindle City
  - Gashouse
  - G-Ville
  - Little Chicago
- Greensboro
  - The Gate City
  - The Boro
  - G-Boro
  - G-Bitty
- Greenville
  - The Emerald City
  - G-Vegas
- High Point
  - Furniture Capital of the World
  - Furniture City
- Jacksonville
  - Marine Town
  - Gateway to Lost Souls
  - The O9
- Kannapolis
  - City of Looms
- Kernersville
  - K-Vegas
  - The Heart of the Triad
- Leland
  - L.A. (Leland Area)
- Lexington
  - L-Town
  - "The BBQ Capital of the World"
- Lincolnton
  - L-Town
  - Lancton
- Mooresville
  - The Dirty Mo
- Mount Airy
  - Mayberry
  - The Granite City
- Maggie Valley
  - Clogging Capital of the World
- New Bern
  - The Bern
  - The Birthplace of Pepsi
  - First Capital of North Carolina
- Pinehurst
  - Golf Capital of the World
- Raleigh
  - The City of Oaks
  - Raleigh Wood
  - Ruff Raleigh
  - Oak City
  - The Big Acorn
- Rocky Mount
  - City On The Rise
  - Murder Mount
- Sherrills Ford
  - Sherrills Fjord
- Thomasville
  - Chair City
  - T-Ville
- Weldon
  - Rockfish Capital of the World
- Wilmington
  - Hollywood East
  - Wilmy
  - Wilmo
  - The Dub
  - The Port City
  - Wilmywood
- Winston-Salem
  - Camel City
  - Tre-Fo
  - The Twin City
  - Tobaccotown

== See also ==
- List of city nicknames in the United States
