= List of city nicknames in Mississippi =

This partial list of city nicknames in Mississippi compiles the aliases, sobriquets and slogans that cities in Mississippi are known by (or have been known by historically), officially and unofficially, to municipal governments, local people, outsiders or their tourism boards or chambers of commerce. City nicknames can help in establishing a civic identity, helping outsiders recognize a community or attracting people to a community because of its nickname; promote civic pride; and build community unity. Nicknames and slogans that successfully create a new community "ideology or myth" are also believed to have economic value. Their economic value is difficult to measure, but there are anecdotal reports of cities that have achieved substantial economic benefits by "branding" themselves by adopting new slogans.

Some unofficial nicknames are positive, while others are derisive. The unofficial nicknames listed here have been in use for a long time or have gained wide currency.

- Artesia – Johnson Grass Capital of the World
- Belzoni – Catfish Capital of the World.
- Biloxi – The Playground of the South
- Columbus – Possum Town
- Greenwood – Cotton Capital of the World.
- Gulfport
  - Root Beer Capital of the World.
  - Where Your Ship Comes In
- Hattiesburg – Hub City
- Jackson
  - Chimneyville
  - City with Soul.
- Long Beach – Radish Capital of the World
- Meridian – The Queen City
- Oxford
  - The literary center of the South
  - The Little Easy (in reference to New Orleans, the "Big Easy")
  - The Velvet Ditch
- Port Gibson – The town too beautiful to burn
- Senatobia – The Five Star City
- Starkville – Starkvegas
- Vicksburg
  - The Gibraltar of America.
  - Red Carpet City of the South
  - Take Me to the River

== See also ==
- List of city nicknames in the United States
