= List of city nicknames in Massachusetts =

This partial list of city nicknames in Massachusetts compiles the aliases, sobriquets, and slogans that cities and towns in Massachusetts are known by (or have been known by historically), officially and unofficially, to municipal governments, local people, outsiders or their tourism boards or chambers of commerce. City nicknames can help in establishing a civic identity, helping outsiders recognize a community or attracting people to a community because of its nickname; promote civic pride; and build community unity. Nicknames and slogans that successfully create a new community "ideology or myth" are also believed to have economic value. Their economic value is difficult to measure, but there are anecdotal reports of cities that have achieved substantial economic benefits by "branding" themselves by adopting new slogans.

Some unofficial nicknames are positive, while others are derisive. The unofficial nicknames listed here have been in use for a long time or have gained wide currency.

For navigational purposes, this list is organized by county.

== Barnstable County ==
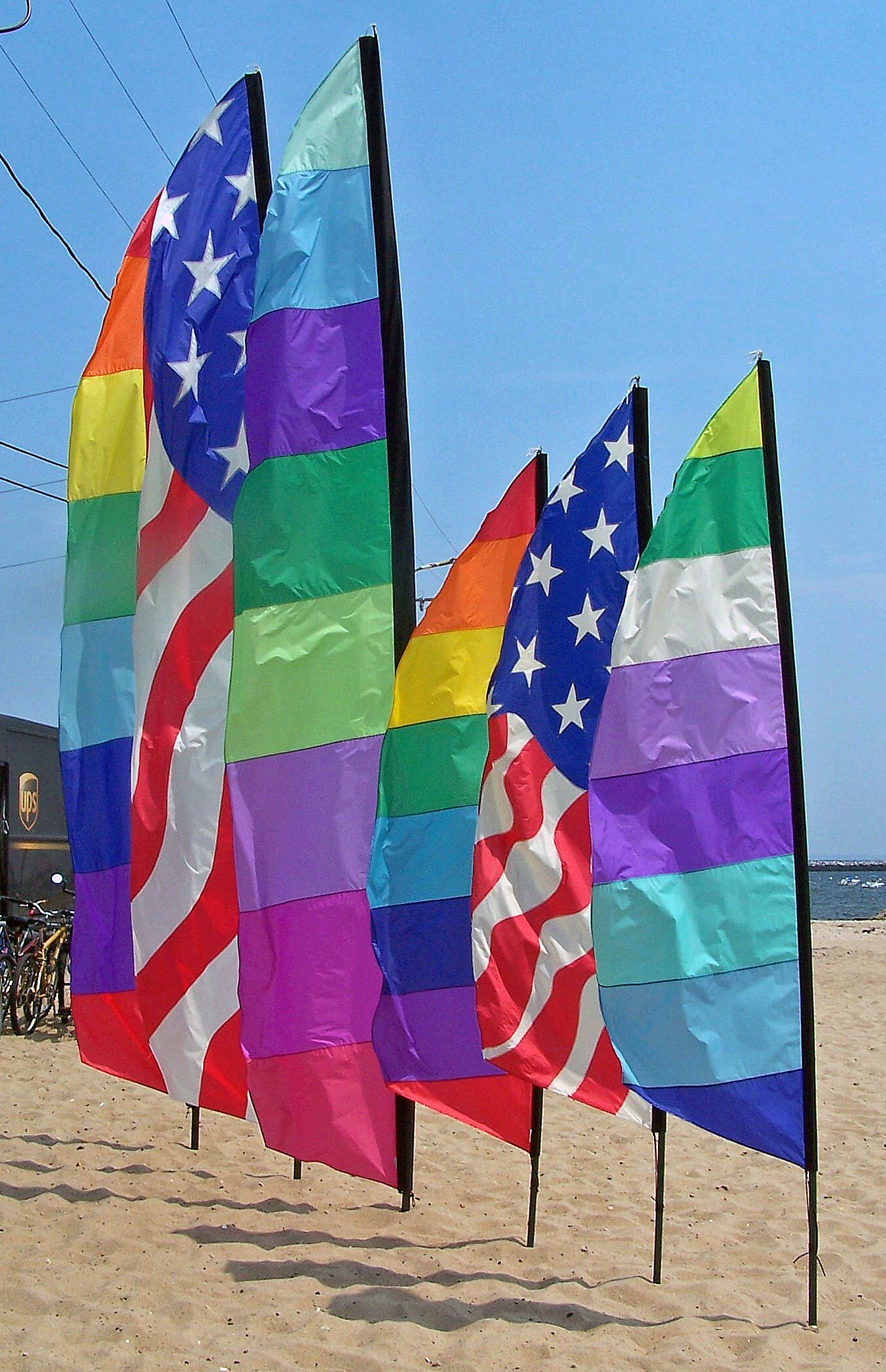
Pride flags in Provincetown, Massachusetts

- Provincetown
  - Like Nowhere Else
  - P-Town
- Sandwich – Sangy

== Berkshire County ==
- North Adams – The Tunnel City
- Williamstown – The Village Beautiful

== Bristol County ==
- Attleboro – Jewelry Capital of America or Jewelry Capital of the World
- Fall River – Scholarship City
- New Bedford – The Whaling City
- Taunton
  - The Christmas City
  - City of Fists
  - The Silver City

== Essex County ==
- Gloucester – Fishtown or Fish City
- Lawrence - Immigrant City
- Lynn - City of Sin
- Newburyport – Clipper City
- North Andover – Turkey Town
- Peabody – Leather City, Tanner City
- Salem
  - City of Peace
  - City of Witches or The Witch City

== Franklin County ==
- Orange - Friendly Town, Jump Town

== Hampden County ==
- Chicopee
  - Kielbasa Capital of the World
- Hadley – Asparagus Capital of the World
- Holyoke
  - Birthplace of Volleyball
  - Paper City
- Springfield
  - Birthplace of Basketball
  - City of Firsts
  - City of Homes
  - City of Progress
  - The City in a Forest
  - Garden Spot of the East
  - The Metropolis of Western New England
- Westfield – The Whip City

== Hampshire County ==
- Northampton
  - Hamp
  - NoHo
  - The Paradise of America or The Paradise City
- Ware
  - The Town That Can't Be Licked

== Middlesex County ==
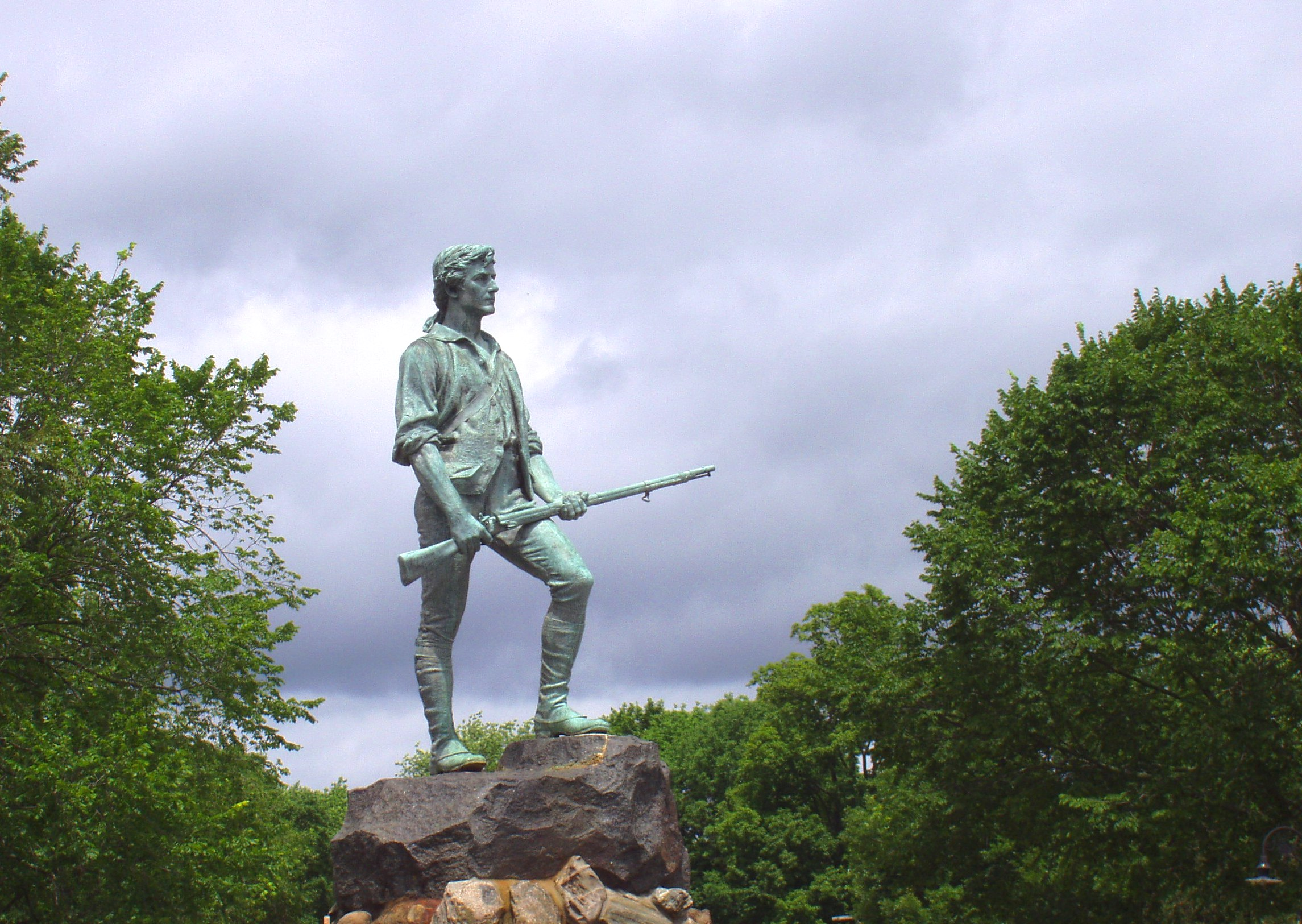
The Minute Man Statue on the Green in Lexington, Massachusetts commemorates the events that earned the town its sobriquet of The Birthplace of American Liberty.

- Ashland - Clock Town
- Belmont – Town of Homes
- Cambridge – The People's Republic of Cambridge
- Framingham – The Dirty Ham or The Ham
- Lexington – The Birthplace of American Liberty
- Lowell
  - The Mill City
  - City of Spindles
  - Manchester of America
- Natick – Home of Champions
- Newton – The Garden City
- Somerville – Slummerville
- Tewksbury – Tewksvegas
- Waltham – Watch City
- Westford – The 'Ford

== Norfolk County ==
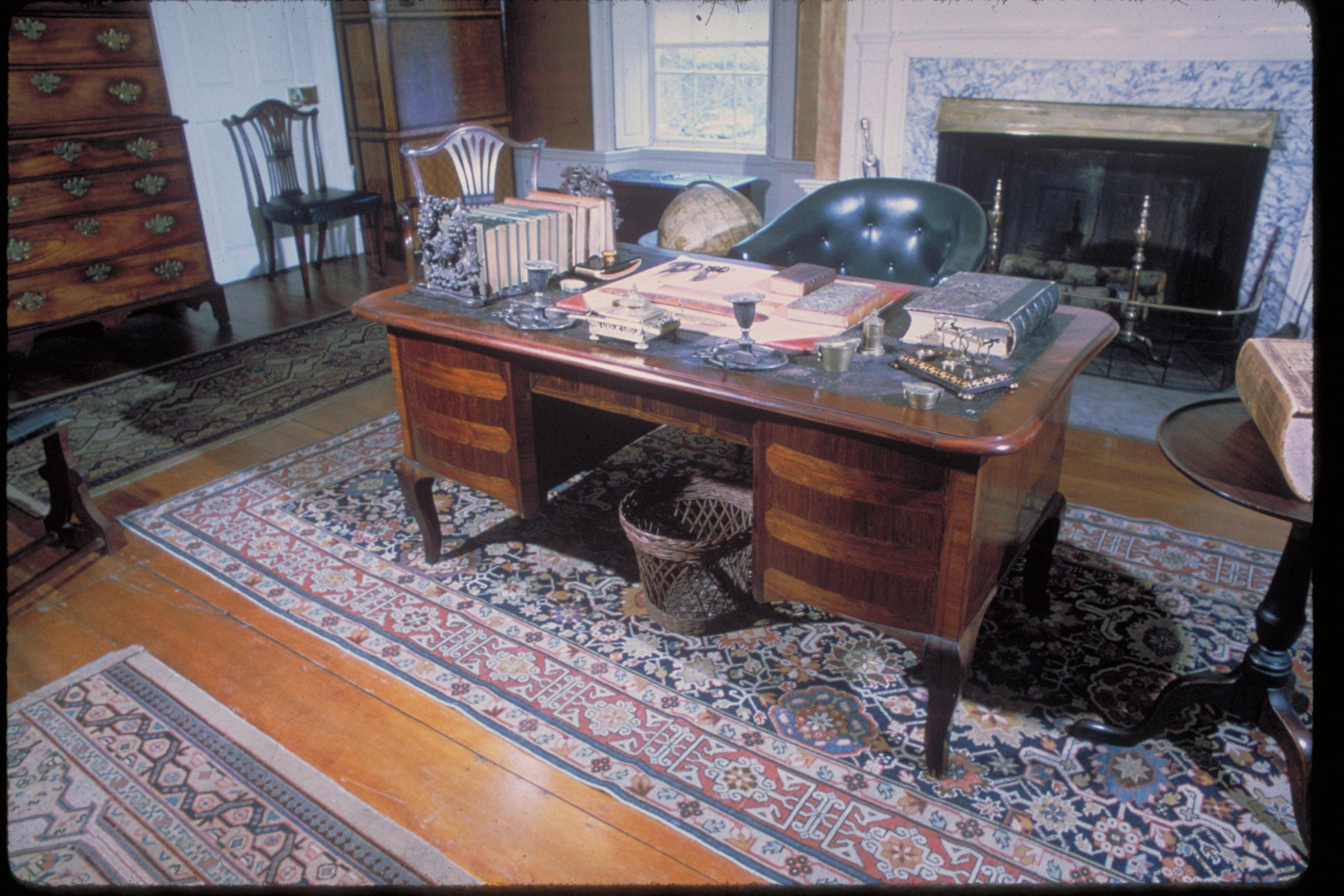
Interior of the Adams National Historical Park in Quincy, Massachusetts

- Foxboro - The Gem of Norfolk County
- Quincy
  - City of Presidents
  - Granite City
- Sharon – Cowtown
- Stoughton –
  - Toughtown
  - Birthplace of American Liberty
- Wellesley
  - Swellesley

== Plymouth County ==
- Brockton – The City of Champions
- Duxbury – Deluxebury
- Hingham
  - Blingham
  - Cha-chingham
- Marshfield - Marshvegas
- Plymouth – America's Hometown
- Scituate – The Irish Riviera
- Wareham – The Gateway to Cape Cod

== Suffolk County ==
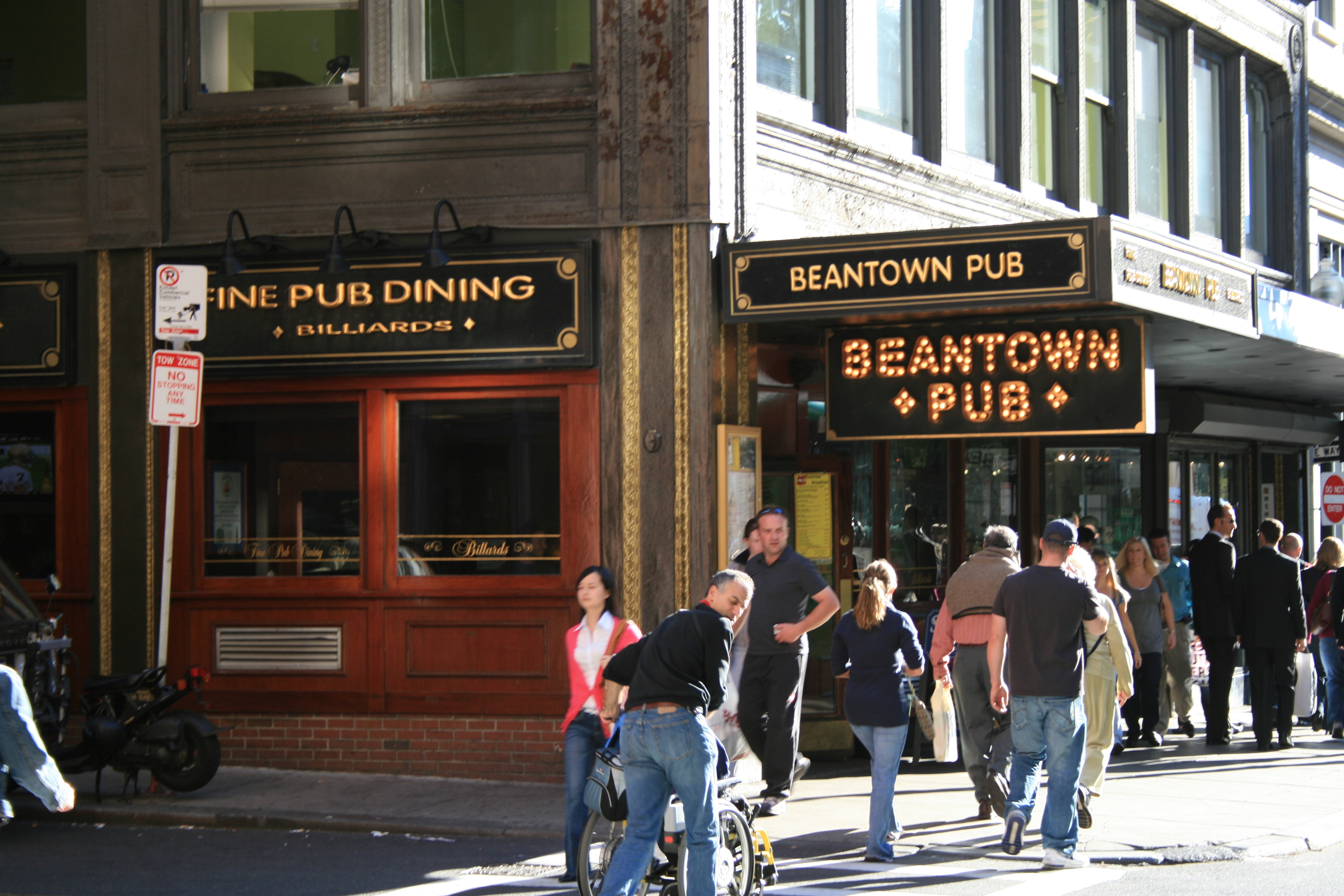
The Beantown Pub in Boston, Massachusetts (the state capital)

- Boston
  - Athens of America – Boston Brahmins' reference to the numerous cultural institutions which separated Boston from its counterparts Also called the Modern Athens.
  - Beantown or Bean Town and variations 'The Bean', 'DA BEAN', BeanCity, B-town, etc.
  - The Hub (or the Hub of the Universe)
  - City of Notions
  - The Cradle of Liberty
  - Puritan City
- Revere – The City of Sand

== Worcester County ==
City flag of Worcester, Massachusetts, with a heart in the middle

- Athol – Tool Town
- Fitchburg – The Dirty Burg
- Gardner
  - Chair City
  - Furniture Capital of New England
- Leominster – Pioneer Plastics City of the World
- Winchendon – Toy Town USA
- Worcester
  - The Heart of the Commonwealth
  - City of Seven Hills
  - Wormtown
  - Paris of the 80's
  - The Woo

== See also ==
- List of city nicknames in the United States
- List of cities in Massachusetts
- Tofu Curtain of Western Massachusetts
