= List of city nicknames in Iowa =

This partial list of city nicknames in Iowa compiles the aliases, sobriquets and slogans that cities in Iowa are known by (or have been known by historically), officially and unofficially, to municipal governments, local people, outsiders or their tourism boards or chambers of commerce. City nicknames can help in establishing a civic identity, helping outsiders recognize a community or attracting people to a community because of its nickname; promote civic pride; and build community unity. Nicknames and slogans that successfully create a new community "ideology or myth" are also believed to have economic value. Their economic value is difficult to measure, but there are anecdotal reports of cities that have achieved substantial economic benefits by "branding" themselves by adopting new slogans.

Some unofficial nicknames are positive, while others are derisive. The unofficial nicknames listed here have been in use for a long time or have gained wide currency.

- Algona – Home of the World's Largest Cheeto
- Cedar Rapids – The City of Five Seasons
- Council Bluffs – Iowa's Leading Edge
- Des Moines – Hartford of the West
- Dubuque – Masterpiece on the Mississippi
- Dyersville – Farm Toy Capital of the World
- Earling – Progress Is Our Future
- Emmetsburg – Iowa's Irish Capital
- Fort Dodge – Mineral City
- Fort Madison – Pen City
- Grinnell – Jewel of the Prairie
- Iowa City – Athens of Iowa
- Keokuk – Gate City (reported in the 1880s)
- Knoxville – Sprint Car Capitol of the World
- Lake City – Everything But the Lake
- Le Mars – Ice Cream Capital of the World
- Sioux City – Little Chicago
- Wyoming – Christmas City
- Villisca – Living with a Mystery

== See also ==
- List of city nicknames in the United States
