= List of city nicknames in Arizona =

This partial list of city nicknames in Arizona compiles the aliases, sobriquets and slogans that cities in Arizona are known by (or have been known by historically), officially and unofficially, to municipal governments, local people, outsiders or their tourism boards or chambers of commerce. City nicknames can help in establishing a civic identity, helping outsiders recognize a community or attracting people to a community because of its nickname; promote civic pride; and build community unity. Nicknames and slogans that successfully create a new community "ideology or myth" are also believed to have economic value. Their economic value is difficult to measure, but there are anecdotal reports of cities that have achieved substantial economic benefits by "branding" themselves by adopting new slogans.

Some unofficial nicknames are positive, while others are derisive. The unofficial nicknames listed here have been in use for a long time or have gained wide currency.

- Apache Junction
  - Home of the Superstition Mountains
  - Gateway to Legends, Lakes, Leisure, and Lost Treasure
- Ash Fork – Flagstone Capital of the United States
- Chandler – High-Tech Oasis of the Silicon Desert
- Flagstaff
  - City in the Pines
  - City of Seven Wonders
  - The Staff
  - Flag
  - Flag Town (C. W. McCall)
- Jerome – America's Most Vertical City
- Kingman – Heart of Route 66
- Phoenix – Arizona's Urban Heart
- Phoenix metropolitan area
  - The Big Saguaro
  - Silicon Desert
  - Valley of the Sun
- Prescott – Everybody's Home Town
- Scottsdale – The West's Most Western Town
- Sedona – Red Rock Country
- Show Low – Named for the Turn of a Card
- Sierra Vista – Hummingbird Capital of the United States
- Tombstone – The Town Too Tough To Die
- Tucson
  - The Old Pueblo
  - The Little Saguaro
  - Dirty T.
  - Optics Valley
  - The Sunshine Factory
- Wickenburg – The Dude Ranch Capital of the World
- Yuma
  - Experience Our Sense of Yuma
  - Yumadre
  - The Oasis
  - Land o’ Lettuce

== See also ==
- List of city nicknames in the United States
