= List of city nicknames in Illinois =

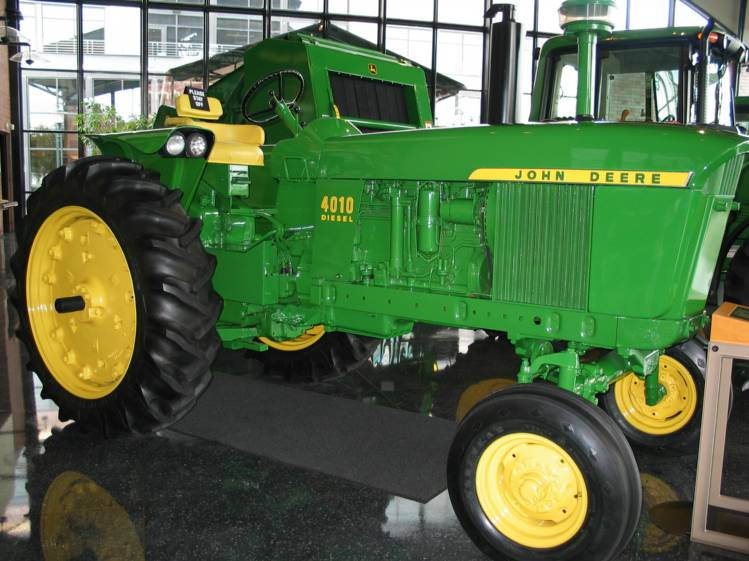
A 4010 Diesel model (manufactured from 1960 to 1963) on display at the John Deere Pavilion in Moline, the home of John Deere. Moline calls itself the "Plow Capital of the World."

This list of city nicknames in Illinois compiles the aliases, sobriquets and slogans that Illinois cities are known by (or have been known by historically), officially and unofficially, to municipal governments, local people, outsiders, or their tourism boards or chambers of commerce. City nicknames can help in establishing a civic identity, helping outsiders recognize a community or attracting people to a community because of its nickname; promote civic pride; and build community unity. Nicknames and slogans that successfully create a new community "ideology or myth" are also believed to have economic value. Their economic value is difficult to measure, but there are anecdotal reports of cities that have achieved substantial economic benefits by "branding" themselves by adopting new slogans.

Some unofficial nicknames are positive, while others are derisive. The unofficial nicknames listed here have been in use for a long time or have gained wide currency.

== Nicknames by city ==
- Algonquin – Gem of the Fox River Valley
- Arlington Heights – Action Heights
- Aurora – City of Lights
  - The Dirty Six-Thirty
- Batavia
  - The Windmill City
  - City of Energy
  - The Dirty Six-Thirty
- Beardstown – Watermelon Capital
- Belleville – Belle-Vegas
- Bloomington – The Evergreen City
- Bloomington–Normal together
  - Blo-No
  - The Twin Cities
- Buffalo Grove – The Gymnastics Capital of Illinois
- Canton – Plow City
- Carbondale – Carbondalay
- Champaign–Urbana
  - Chambana
  - Twin Cities
- Charleston – Chucktown
- Chester – The Home of Popeye
- Chicago (A to Z)
  - Chi-Town
  - Chiraq
  - City in a Garden (literal translation of city motto, Urbs in horto)
  - The City of the Big Shoulders (from Chicago, a Carl Sandburg poem)
  - The City That Works (by Mayor Daley, for example)
  - Mud City
  - The Second City
  - The White City (referencing the World's Columbian Exposition)
  - The Windy City
- Collinsville – Horseradish Capital of the World
- Crystal Lake – A Good Place to Live
- Decatur
  - D-Town
  - Soybean Capital of the World
  - Soy City
- DeKalb – Barbed Wire Capital of the World
- Des Plaines – City of Destiny
- East St. Louis
  - City of Champions
  - East Boogie
  - East Side
  - ESL
- Effingham – The Ham
- Elgin
  - The City in the Suburbs
  - The City to Watch
- Evanston – Heavenston
- Freeport – Pretzel City, USA
- Griggsville – Purple Martin Capital of the World
- Glen Ellyn – Babcock's Grove
  - The Dirty Six-Thirty
- Huntley – The Friendly Village with Country Charm
- Joliet
  - City of Champions
  - City of "Snap and Progress"
  - City of Steel (or City of Steel and Stone)
  - City of Stone
  - Prison City (or Prison Town)
  - J-Town
- Kankakee – Key City
- Kewanee – Hog Capital of the World
- Lombard – The Lilac Village
  - The Dirty Six-Thirty
- Lisle – The Arboretum Village
  - The Dirty Six-Thirty
- Marion – Hub City of the Universe
- Marseilles
  - Martucky
  - Best Little Town by a Dam Site
- Mattoon – Bagel Capital of the World
- Maywood – Village of Eternal Light
- Melrose Park – Corporate King of the Suburbs
- Metropolis – The Home of Superman
- Moline
  - Plow Capital of the World
  - City of Mills
  - Lowell of the West
- Monmouth – The Maple City
- Morton – Pumpkin Capital of the World
- Naperville
  - Naperthrill
  - The Dirty Six-Thirty
- Olney – Home of the White Squirrels
- Park Ridge – Home of the Hawks
- Pana – City of Roses
- Pekin
  - Celestial City
  - Marigold Capital of the World
- Peoria – P-Town
- Quincy – Gem City
- Rantoul – Rantucky
- Rockford
  - The Forest City
  - Screw City
- Springfield
  - Flower City
  - Springpatch
- St. Charles – The Pride of the Fox
  - The Dirty Six-Thirty
- Teutopolis – T-Town
- Thomson – The Melon Capital of the World
- Warrenville – For a Visit, Or a Lifetime
  - The Dirty Six-Thirty
- Wilmington – The Island City

== See also ==
- List of municipalities in Illinois
- List of city nicknames in the United States
