= List of city nicknames in Washington =

The following is a list of nicknames, aliases, sobriquets and slogans for municipalities and unincorporated communities in the U.S. state of Washington.

City nicknames can help in establishing a civic identity, helping outsiders recognize a community or attracting people to a community because of its nickname; promote civic pride; and build community unity. Nicknames and slogans that successfully create a new community "ideology or myth" are also believed to have economic value. Their economic value is difficult to measure, but there are anecdotal reports of cities that have achieved substantial economic benefits by "branding" themselves by adopting new slogans.

This list includes both official and unofficial nicknames. Some of the nicknames that were used historically may no longer be in use.

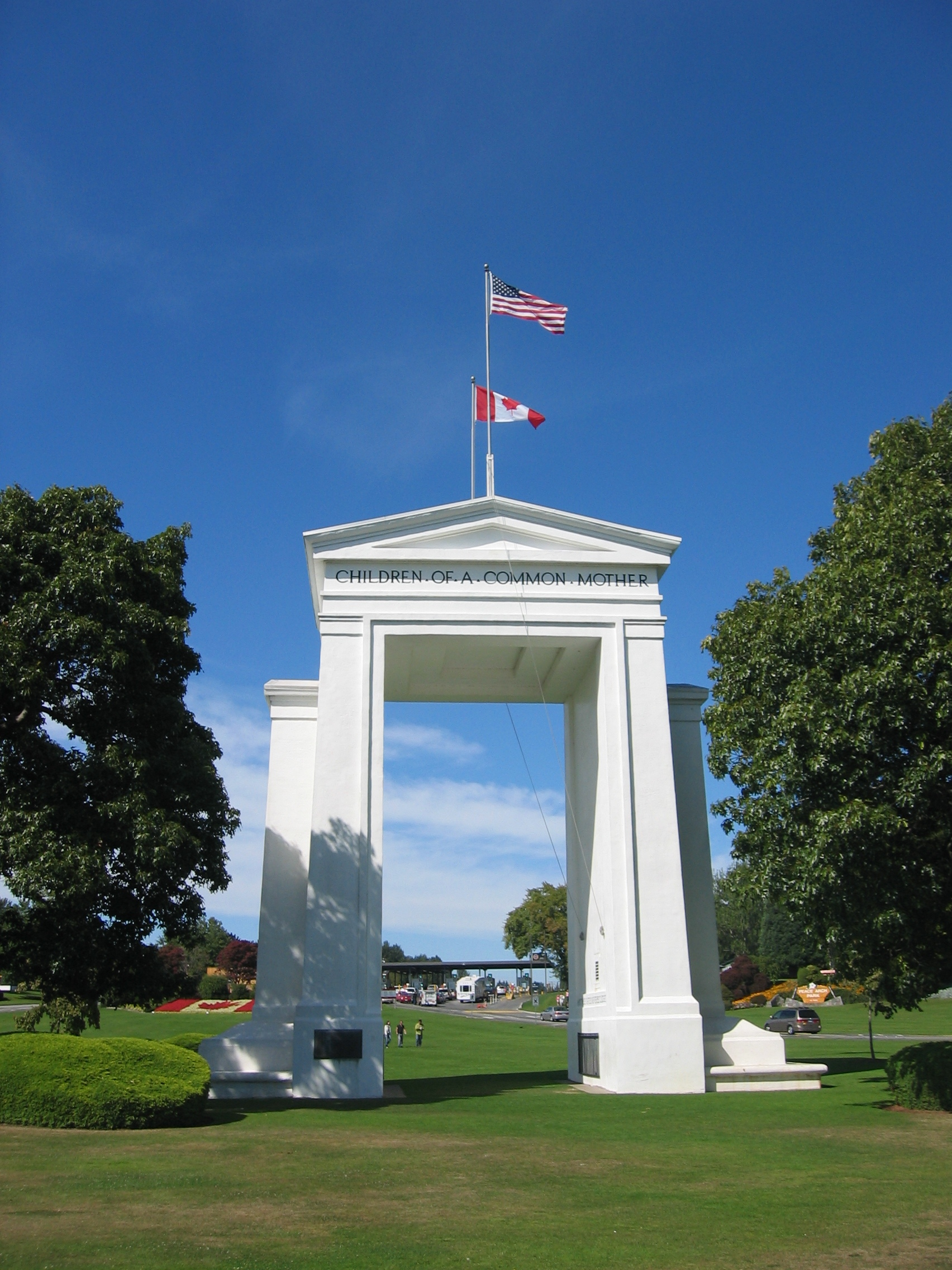
Blaine's nickname celebrates the Peace Arch on the U.S. border with Canada.

- Aberdeen – Port of Missing Men
- Algona – City of the Great Blue Heron
- Auburn – More Than You Imagined
- Bellevue – City in a Park
- Bellingham
  - City of Subdued Excitement
  - Let Us Surprise You
- Blaine – The Peace Arch City
- Bothell – For a Day or a Lifetime
- Burien – B-Town
- Burlington – The Hub City
- Chehalis
  - The Friendly City
  - Rose City (official)
  - Mint City
- Chewelah – Place For All Seasons
- Colville – Washington's Most Livable Community
- Cosmopolis – City of the World
- Enumclaw – The Gateway to Mount Rainier
- Everett
  - City of Smokestacks
  - Milltown
- Forks – The Logging Capital of the World
- Gig Harbor – The Maritime City
- Ilwaco – By Land or By Sea
- Kelso
  - City of Friendly People
  - Smelt Capital of the World
- Kirkland
  - Gateway to Seattle (adopted in 1926)
  - The Little City that Could
- Lynden – The Gem City
- Marysville – The Strawberry City
- Morton – Home of the Loggers Jubilee
- Mount Vernon – The City of Tulips
- Olympia
  - Oly
  - The Town (The original city nicknamed The Town)
- Port Townsend, Washington
  - The City of Dreams
  - The Key City
- Poulsbo – Little Norway
- Pullman – Lentil Capital
- Puyallup – The Land of Generous People
- Redmond – Bicycle Capital of the Northwest
- Richland
  - The Windy Town
  - City Of the Bombers
  - Atomic City
- Seattle
  - City of Flowers (adopted in the 1940s)
  - Emerald City: official since 1982
  - Jet City: for the prominence of the aerospace industry, especially Boeing.
  - Queen City (of the Pacific Northwest): official from 1869–1982
  - Rain City
  - Sea-Town
- Sedro-Woolley – Gateway to the North Cascades
- Sequim – Sunny Sequim
- Spokane – The Lilac City
- Sumner – Rhubarb Pie Capital
- Tacoma
  - America’s #1 Wired City
  - The City of Destiny – Applied in 1873 when Tacoma was the terminus for the Northern Pacific Railroad.
  - Tackyoma
  - T-Town
  - Grit City
- Tumwater – Green Town
- Walla Walla – The City was so Nice, They Named it Twice
- Wenatchee – Apple Capital of the World.
- White Center – Rat City
- White Salmon – The Land Where the Sun Meets the Rain
- Yakima – The Palm Springs of Washington

== See also ==
- List of city nicknames in the United States
- List of cities in Washington
- List of towns in Washington
- List of census-designated places in Washington
- List of unincorporated communities in Washington
