= List of city nicknames in New Mexico =

This partial list of city nicknames in New Mexico compiles the aliases, sobriquets and slogans that cities in New Mexico are known by (or have been known by historically), officially and unofficially, to municipal governments, local people, outsiders or their tourism boards or chambers of commerce. City nicknames can help in establishing a civic identity, helping outsiders recognize a community or attracting people to a community because of its nickname; promote civic pride; and build community unity. Nicknames and slogans that successfully create a new community "ideology or myth" are also believed to have economic value. Their economic value is difficult to measure, but there are anecdotal reports of cities that have achieved substantial economic benefits by "branding" themselves by adopting new slogans.

Some unofficial nicknames are positive, while others are derisive. The unofficial nicknames listed here have been in use for a long time or have gained wide currency.

- Albuquerque
  - Burque
  - The Duke City
  - The Q
- Anthony – Leap Year Capital of the World (shared with Anthony, Texas)
- Carlsbad – Cavern City
- Cloudcroft - A Pasture for the Clouds
- Gallup – Native American Capital of the World
- Hatch – Chile Pepper Capital of the World
- Las Cruces
  - The City of the Garden of Crosses
  - Stinktown
- Las Vegas – Meadow City
- Los Alamos – Atomic City
- Rio Rancho – City of Vision
- Rodeo – New Mexico's most western town
- Roswell
  - Alien Capital of the World
  - The Aliens Aren't the Only Reason to Visit
- Santa Fe – The City Different
- Santa Rosa – The Scuba Capital of the Southwest
- Taos – Soul of the Southwest

== See also ==
- List of city nicknames in the United States
