= List of city nicknames in New Jersey =

This partial list of city nicknames in New Jersey compiles the aliases, sobriquets and slogans that cities, other municipalities, and other populated places in New Jersey are known by (or have been known by historically), officially and unofficially, to municipal governments, local people, outsiders or their tourism boards or chambers of commerce. City nicknames can help in establishing a civic identity, helping outsiders recognize a community or attracting people to a community because of its nickname; promote civic pride; and build community unity. Nicknames and slogans that successfully create a new community "ideology or myth" are also believed to have economic value. Their economic value is difficult to measure, but there are anecdotal reports of cities that have achieved substantial economic benefits by "branding" themselves by adopting new slogans.

Some unofficial nicknames are positive, while others are derisive. The unofficial nicknames listed here have been in use for a long time or have gained wide currency.

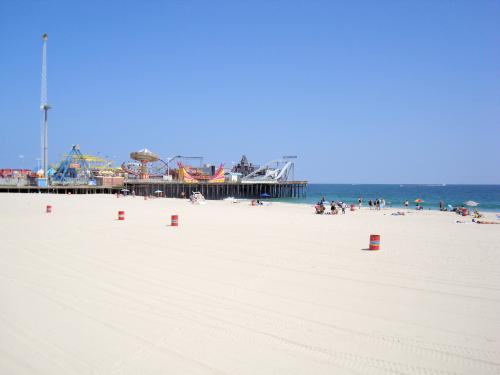
Nicknames of several New Jersey communities celebrate their status as Jersey Shore resorts.

- Asbury Park – The Dark City
- Atlantic City – A.C., America's Playground, "The City" (inside Atlantic County)
- Belleville – The Cherry Blossom Capital of America
- Byram Township – The Township of Lakes
- Caldwell – The Denver of the East
- Carlstadt, New Jersey – Home of the Nation's First Kindergarten
- Cranford – The Venice of New Jersey
- Denville – Hub of Morris County
- East Orange – Illtown
- Elizabeth – Eastwick
- Emerson – E-Town
- Fair Lawn – The Lawn
- Fort Lee – The Birthplace of the Motion Picture Industry
- Fortescue – Weakfish Capital of the World
- Franklin – Fluorescent Mineral Capital of the World
- Garfield - The City of Champions
- Garwood – The Industrial Center of Union County
- Hackensack – A City in Motion
- Hammonton – Blueberry Capital of the World
- Hasbrouck Heights – Hasbro Nation
- Hoboken – The Mile Square City
- Irvington – Ghost Town, formerly known as Camptown
- Jersey City – America's Golden Door, Chilltown, Wall Street West, The Sixth Borough
- Keansburg – The Burg, Gem of the Bayshore
- Lambertville – Antique Capital of New Jersey
- Long Beach Island – L.B.I.
- Long Branch – America's First Seaside Resort, The Friendly City
- Madison – The Rose City
- Maplewood – MapSo (in reference to the town's close/symbiotic relationship with neighboring town, South Orange)
- Metuchen – The Brainy Borough (alternately spelled Brainy Boro)
- Millville – The Holly City
- Morristown – Motown, The Military Capital of the American Revolution
- Mount Laurel – Hotel Land
- Neptune Township – The Crossroads of the Jersey Shore
- New Brunswick – Health Care City, Hub City
- Newark – Brick City, Gateway City, Renaissance Newark
- North Arlington – Where Bergen County Begins
- Ocean City – America's Greatest Family Resort, A Moral Seaside Resort (historic slogan from the 19th century)
- Paterson – Silk City
- Perth Amboy – City by the Bay
- Plainfield – Queen City
- Pleasantville – P-Ville
- Rutherford – Borough of Trees, The First Borough of Bergen County
- Seaside Heights – Sleazeside
- South Orange – SoMa (in reference to the township's close/symbiotic relationship with neighboring town, Maplewood)
- Spring Lake – The Irish Riviera
- Trenton – Capital City, The Town
- Tuckerton – Clamtown
- Union City – Embroidery Capital of the United States, Havana on the Hudson
- Vineland – Dandelion Capital of the World

== See also ==
- List of city nicknames in the United States
- List of municipalities in New Jersey (by population)
