= List of city nicknames in West Virginia =

This partial list of city nicknames in West Virginia compiles the aliases, sobriquets and slogans that cities in West Virginia are known by (or have been known by historically), officially and unofficially, to municipal governments, local people, outsiders or their tourism boards or chambers of commerce. City nicknames can help in establishing a civic identity, helping outsiders recognize a community or attracting people to a community because of its nickname; promote civic pride; and build community unity. Nicknames and slogans that successfully create a new community "ideology or myth" are also believed to have economic value. Their economic value is difficult to measure, but there are anecdotal reports of cities that have achieved substantial economic benefits by "branding" themselves by adopting new slogans.

Some unofficial nicknames are positive, while others are derisive. The unofficial nicknames listed here have been in use for a long time or have gained wide currency.

- Bluefield – Nature's Air Conditioned City
- Charleston – Chemicalville
- Fairmont – The Gymnastics Capital of West Virginia
- Petersburg – Home of the Golden Trout
- Weirton – Forged by Steel
- Wheeling – Nail City

== See also ==
- List of city nicknames in the United States
