= List of city nicknames in Virginia =

This partial list of city nicknames in Virginia compiles the aliases, sobriquets and slogans that cities in the U.S. state of Virginia are known by (or have been known by historically), officially and unofficially, to municipal governments, local people, outsiders or their tourism boards or chambers of commerce.

City nicknames can establish a civic identity, help outsiders recognize a community, attract people to a community because of its nickname, promote civic pride, and build community unity. Nicknames and slogans that successfully create a new community "ideology or myth" are also believed to have economic value. This value is difficult to measure, but there are anecdotal reports of cities that have achieved substantial economic benefits by "branding" themselves by adopting new slogans.

Some unofficial nicknames are positive, while others are derisive. The unofficial nicknames listed here have been in use for a long time or have gained wide currency.

- Ashland – The Center of the Universe
- Bristol – The Birthplace of Country Music (shares this nickname with Bristol, Tennessee)
- Charlottesville – Cville
- Colonial Beach – Oyster Capital of the Potomac
- Falls Church – The Little City
- Fredericksburg
  - F'Burg
  - America's Most Historic City
  - Where History Never Gets Old
- Harrisonburg – The Friendly City
- Honaker – Redbud Capital of the World
- Lexington
  - The Paris of Southwest Virginia
  - Home of Hamric House
- Lynchburg
  - City of Seven Hills
  - The Hill City
- Newport News – Bad News
- Norfolk
  - Life, Celebrated Daily
  - Mermaid City, USA
- Portsmouth – P-Town
- Radford – The New River City
- Richmond
  - Capital of the South
  - The River City
  - RVA
  - Dirt City
- Roanoke
  - Magic City
  - Star City of the South
- Virginia Beach
  - Neptune City
  - The Resort City
  - VA Beach
- Williamsburg
  - The Burg
  - The Colonial Capital
  - Thrilliamsburg
  - Billysburg
- Winchester – Apple Capital of the World

== See also ==
- List of city nicknames in the United States
