= List of city nicknames in Oregon =

This partial list of city nicknames in Oregon compiles the aliases, sobriquets and slogans that cities in Oregon are known by (or have been known by historically), officially and unofficially, to municipal governments, local people, outsiders or their tourism boards or chambers of commerce. City nicknames can help in establishing a civic identity, helping outsiders recognize a community or attracting people to a community because of its nickname; promote civic pride; and build community unity. Nicknames and slogans that successfully create a new community "ideology or myth" are also believed to have economic value. Their economic value is difficult to measure, but there are anecdotal reports of cities that have achieved substantial economic benefits by "branding" themselves by adopting new slogans.

Some unofficial nicknames are positive, while others are derisive. Many of the unofficial nicknames listed here have been in use for a long time or have gained wide currency.

- Albany – Grass Seed Capital of the World
- Amity – Where Friendship Begins
- Brookings – Where Flowers Meet the Sea
- Carlton – A Great Little Town
- Columbia City – City of Beauty and Livability
- Cornelius – Oregon's Family Town
- Cottage Grove – Covered Bridge Capital of Oregon
- Dayton – Rich In History . . . Envisioning Our Future
- Depoe Bay
  - Whale Watching Capital of the Oregon Coast
  - The World's Smallest Harbor
- Estacada – Christmas Tree Capital of the World
- Eugene
  - The Emerald City
  - Tracktown, USA
- Forest Grove – A Place Where Families and Businesses Thrive
- Garibaldi – Oregon's Authentic Fishing Village
- Grants Pass – Where the Rogue River Runs
- Keizer – Iris Capital of the World
- Klamath Falls – Oregon's City of Sunshine
- La Grande – The Hub of Northeast Oregon
- Lakeview – Tallest Town in Oregon
- Lebanon – It's Easier From Here
- Milton-Freewater – Muddy Frogwater Country
- Milwaukie – The Dogwood City of the West
- Molalla – Home of the Buckaroo Rodeo
- Newberg – A Great Place to Grow
- Newport – The Dungeness Crab Capital of the World
- North Plains – City to the Sunset
- Nyssa
  - Gateway to the Oregon Trail
  - Thunderegg Capital of the World
- Oakridge
  - The Center of Oregon Recreation
  - Mountain Biking Capital of the Northwest
- Ontario – Where Oregon Begins
- Phoenix – The Other Phoenix
- Portland
  - Bridgetown
  - Rip City
  - Rose City or City of Roses
  - Stumptown
- Roseburg – Timber Capital of the Nation
- Salem – The Cherry City
- Sandy – Gateway to Mount Hood
- Silverton – Oregon's Garden City
- Springfield – Proud History, Bright Future
- Stayton – Gateway to the Santiam Canyon
- Sweet Home ‐ 'Gateway to the Santiam Playground' - 'Sugar City'
- Talent – Our name speaks for itself
- Tigard – A Place to Call Home
- Waldport – Where the Forest Meets the Sea
- Yamhill – A Small Taste of Oregon

== See also ==
- List of city nicknames in the United States
