= List of city nicknames in Nebraska =

This partial list of city nicknames in Nebraska compiles the aliases, sobriquets and slogans that cities in Nebraska are known by (or have been known by historically), officially and unofficially, to municipal governments, local people, outsiders or their tourism boards or chambers of commerce. City nicknames can help in establishing a civic identity, helping outsiders recognize a community or attracting people to a community because of its nickname; promote civic pride; and build community unity. Nicknames and slogans that successfully create a new community "ideology or myth" are also believed to have economic value. Their economic value is difficult to measure, but there are anecdotal reports of cities that have achieved substantial economic benefits by "branding" themselves by adopting new slogans.

Some unofficial nicknames are positive, while others are derisive. The unofficial nicknames listed here have been in use for a long time or have gained wide currency.

- Arcadia - If you Lived Here, You'd be Home
- Bellevue - We Influence the World
- Bellwood - A Great Community
- Columbus - City of Power and Progress
- Cozad – Alfalfa Capital of the World
- Crawford – Deer Capital of Nebraska
- Dannebrog – Danish Capital of Nebraska
- Elgin - Some Bigger, Some Smaller, None Better
- Eustis – Sausage Capital of Nebraska
- Falls City - City of the Arts
- Gibbon - Smile City
- Hastings
  - Queen City of the Plains
  - Birthplace of Kool-Aid.
- Kearney
  - K-Town
  - Dobytown
- Lincoln
  - Hartford of the West
  - Husker City
  - The Star City
  - Steak Capital of the World
- Loup City – Polish Capital of Nebraska
- Petersburg, Nebraska - A Great Place for a Home Town
- North Loup – Popcorn Capital
- North Platte
  - Little Chicago
  - Flat Rock
- Oakland – Swedish Capital of Nebraska
- O'Neill – Nebraska's Irish Capital
- Omaha
  - Big "O"
  - River City
  - Gateway to the West
- Randolph – Honey Capital of the Nation
- Saint Paul - Baseball Capital of Nebraska
- Seward – Nebraska's 4th of July City
- South Omaha – The Magic City
- Valentine – Nebraska's Heart City
- Valparaiso - Valley of Paradise
- Unadilla – Groundhog Capital of Nebraska
- Waverly, Nebraska - A Great Place to Grow

== See also ==
- History of Nebraska
- List of city nicknames in the United States
