= List of city nicknames in Arkansas =

This partial list of city nicknames in Arkansas compiles the aliases, sobriquets and slogans that the state's cities are known by (or have been known by historically), officially and unofficially, to municipal governments, local people, outsiders or their tourism boards or chambers of commerce. City nicknames can help in establishing a civic identity, helping outsiders recognize a community or attracting people to a community because of its nickname; promote civic pride; and build community unity. Nicknames and slogans that successfully create a new community "ideology or myth" are also believed to have economic value. Their economic value is difficult to measure, but there are anecdotal reports of cities that have achieved substantial economic benefits by "branding" themselves by adopting new slogans.

Some unofficial nicknames are positive, while others are derisive. The unofficial nicknames listed here have been in use for a long time or have gained wide currency.

- Alma – Spinach Capital of the World
- Berryville – Turkey Capital
- Brinkley – Home of the Ivory-billed Woodpecker
- Conway – The City of Colleges (The University of Central Arkansas, Hendrix College, and Central Baptist College)
- Dumas – Home of the Ding Dong Daddy
- El Dorado
  - Arkansas' Original Boomtown
  - Queen City of South Arkansas
- Emerson – The Biggest Little Town in Arkansas
- Eureka Springs - Little Switzerland of the Ozarks
- Fayetteville
  - Hog Country
  - Track Capital of the World
- Green Forest – Tomato Capital
- Hope – Watermelon Capital of the World
- Hot Springs – Spa City
- Jasper – Elk Capital of Arkansas
- Jonesboro
  - The City of Churches
  - The Crepe Myrtle City
- Little Rock
  - The City of Roses
  - River City
- Lowell – A Town with a Past, A City with a Future
- Malvern – Brick Capital of the World
- Mount Ida – Quartz Crystal Capital of the World
- Mountain View – Folk Music Capital of the World
- Nashville – Peach Capital
- North Little Rock – Dogtown
- Stuttgart – Rice and Duck Capital of the World
- Texarkana – Twice as Nice

== See also ==
- List of city nicknames in the United States
