= List of city nicknames in Indiana =

This partial list of city nicknames in Indiana compiles the aliases, sobriquets and slogans that cities and towns in Indiana are known by (or have been known by historically), officially and unofficially, to municipal governments, local people, outsiders or their tourism boards or chambers of commerce. City nicknames can help in establishing a civic identity, helping outsiders recognize a community or attracting people to a community because of its nickname; promote civic pride; and build community unity. Nicknames and slogans that successfully create a new community "ideology or myth" are also believed to have economic value. Their economic value is difficult to measure, but there are anecdotal reports of cities that have achieved substantial economic benefits by "branding" themselves by adopting new slogans.

Some unofficial nicknames are positive, while others are derisive. The unofficial nicknames listed here have been in use for a long time or have gained wide currency.

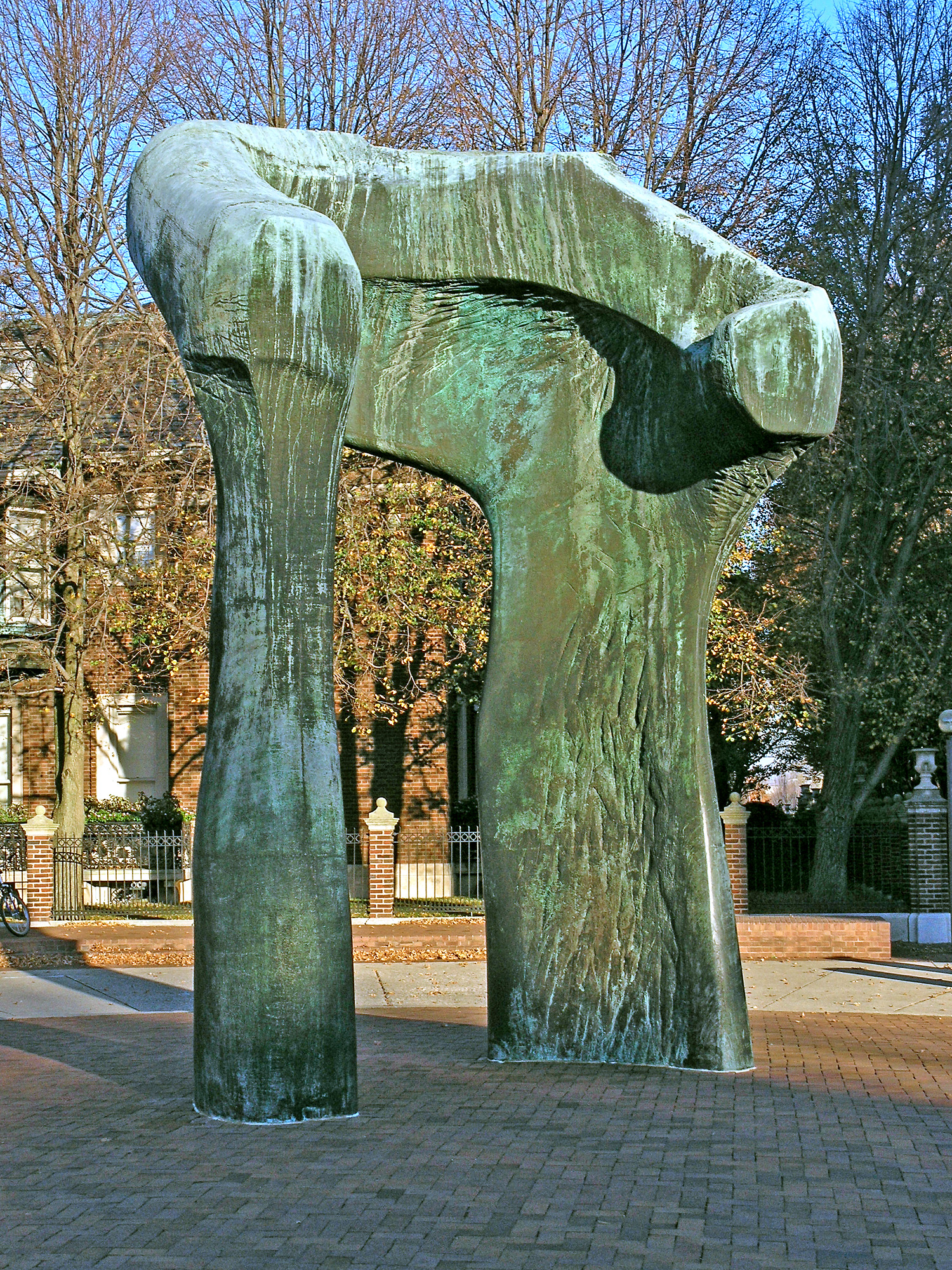
The nickname "Athens of the Prairie" was bestowed on Columbus, Indiana, due to the large assemblage of contemporary architecture and public sculpture in the city, including Henry Moore's "Large Arch."

- Albion – Gateway to the Chain O' Lakes
- Anderson – Pittsburg of the White River Valley
- Auburn
  - Buggy City
  - Home of the Classics
- Bedford – Stone City
- Berne - Furniture Capitol of Indiana
- Bloomington
  - B-Town
  - University City
  - Bloom
- Bluffton
  - Asphalt City
  - Parlor City
- Brazil
  - Black Diamond City
  - Clay Metropolis
- Carmel
  - Roundabout Capital of the U.S.
  - SwimCity, USA
- Chesterton – Gateway to the Dunes
- Churubusco – Turtle Town, U.S.A.
- Clay City – Mayberry of the Midwest
- Columbus – Athens of the Prairie
- Crawfordsville – Athens of Indiana
- Elkhart
  - City of Musical Doings
  - Independent State
  - RV Capital of the World
- Ellettsville – Diet Bloomington
- Elwood
  - Buckle of the Gas Belt
  - Gem City of the Gas Belt
- Evansville
  - Crescent City
  - Pocket City
  - River City
  - Stoplight City
  - Heavensville
  - Evansvegas
- Fort Wayne
  - City of Churches
  - City That Saved Itself
  - Magnet Wire Capital of the World
  - Summit City
- Gary
  - City of the Century
  - Magic City
  - Steel City
- Goshen – Maple City
- Greensburg – Tree City
- Hobart – The Friendly City
- Huntington – Lime City
- Indianapolis
- Jeffersonville – Jeff
- Kokomo – City of Firsts
- Lafayette – Star City
- La Porte
  - City of Lakes
  - Maple City
- Logansport
  - City of Bridges
  - City of Churches
- Madison – City 'Neath the Hills
- Marion – Queen City or Queen City of the Gas Belt
- Martinsville
  - City of Mineral Water
  - Goldfish Capital of the World
- Medaryville
  - Tatertown
  - Mudville
- Mishawaka
  - Peppermint Capital of the World
  - Princess City
- Monticello - Monticompton
- Muncie
  - Funcie
  - Middletown
  - Little Chicago
- Peru
  - Barbecue City
  - Circus Capital of the World
- Richmond
  - Quaker City of the West
  - Rose City
- Rockville – Covered Bridge Capital of the World
- Roselawn – Naked City
- South Bend
  - Lotion City
  - Metropolis of Northern Indiana
  - Wagon City
- Speedway – Racing Capital of the World
- Terre Haute
  - Queen City of the Wabash
  - Crossroads of America (National Road/U.S. Route 40 and Dixie Bee Rd/U.S. Route 41 met in downtown)
  - Sin City - dubbed by Stag Magazine in 1955 issue; supported by Terre Haute's notorious reputation for bordellos, bootlegging and illegal casinos
  - Prairie City (eastern edge of the Great Plains/prairies)
  - Pittsburgh of the West (historical: city was an early steel center)
- Valparaiso
  - Vale of Paradise
  - Valpo
- Van Buren – Popcorn Capital of the World
- Vincennes
  - Indiana's First City
  - Old Post
  - Pioneer City of the Wabash Valley
- Wabash – Rock City
- Warsaw
  - Lake City
  - Orthopedic Capital of the World

== See also ==
- List of city nicknames in the United States
- List of cities in Indiana
