= List of city nicknames in Rhode Island =

This partial list of city nicknames in Rhode Island compiles the aliases, sobriquets and slogans that cities, towns, and villages in Rhode Island are known by (or have been known by historically), officially and unofficially, to municipal governments, local people, outsiders or their tourism boards or chambers of commerce. City nicknames can help in establishing a civic identity, helping outsiders recognize a community or attracting people to a community because of its nickname; promote civic pride; and build community unity. Nicknames and slogans that successfully create a new community "ideology or myth" are also believed to have economic value. Their economic value is difficult to measure, but there are anecdotal reports of cities that have achieved substantial economic benefits by "branding" themselves by adopting new slogans.

Some unofficial nicknames are positive, while others are derisive. Many of the unofficial nicknames listed here have been in use for a long time or have gained wide currency.

- Galilee (in the town of Narrangansett) – Tuna Capital of the World
- Newport
  - America's First Resort
  - Sailing Capital of the World
- Pawtucket – The Bucket
- Providence
  - America's Renaissance City or The Renaissance City
  - Beehive of Industry
  - The Creative Capital
  - PVD
  - "Prov"
- Warwick – Crossroads of Rhode Island
- Woonsocket – Woony

== See also ==
- List of city nicknames in the United States
- List of municipalities in Rhode Island
