= List of city nicknames in Delaware =

This partial list of city nicknames in Delaware compiles the aliases, sobriquets and slogans that cities are known by (or have been known by historically), officially and unofficially, to municipal governments, local people, outsiders or their tourism boards or chambers of commerce. City nicknames can help in establishing a civic identity, helping outsiders recognize a community or attracting people to a community because of its nickname; promote civic pride; and build community unity. Nicknames and slogans that successfully create a new community "ideology or myth" are also believed to have economic value. Their economic value is difficult to measure, but there are anecdotal reports of cities that have achieved substantial economic benefits by "branding" themselves by adopting new slogans.

- Dover – The City that Means Well (according to George Carlin)
- Lewes – First Town in the First State.
- Rehoboth Beach – The Nation's Summer Capital.
- Seaford – The Nylon Capital of the World
- Wilmington – Chemical Capital of the World.

== See also ==
- List of city nicknames in the United States
