= List of city nicknames in Louisiana =

This partial list of city nicknames in Louisiana compiles the aliases, sobriquets and slogans that cities in Louisiana are known by (or have been known by historically), officially and unofficially, to municipal governments, local people, outsiders or their tourism boards or chambers of commerce. City nicknames can help in establishing a civic identity, helping outsiders recognize a community or attracting people to a community because of its nickname; promote civic pride; and build community unity. Nicknames and slogans that successfully create a new community "ideology or myth" are also believed to have economic value. Their economic value is difficult to measure, but there are anecdotal reports of cities that have achieved substantial economic benefits by "branding" themselves by adopting new slogans.

Some unofficial nicknames are positive, while others are derisive. The unofficial nicknames listed here have been in use for a long time or have gained wide currency.

- Baton Rouge – Big Raggedy

that Raq

- Breaux Bridge – Crayfish Capital of the World or Crawfish Capital of the World (In Louisiana vernacular, "Crawfish" would be the correct way to say it.)
- Des Allemands – Catfish Capital of the World
- Dubach – Dogtrot Capital of the World
- Gonzales – Jambalaya Capital of the World
- Gueydan – Duck Capital of America
- Jennings – Cradle of Louisiana Oil
- Lake Charles - The Chuck
- Lafayette
  - The Heart of Acadiana
- Lecompte – Pie Capital of Louisiana
- New Orleans
  - America's Favorite City
  - America's Most Interesting City
  - America’s Most European City
  - America's European Masterpiece
  - The Big Easy
  - Birthplace of Jazz
  - City of the Chefs
  - City of Festivals
  - City of Mystery
  - The City that Care Forgot
  - The Crescent City
  - Mardi Gras City
  - Nawlins
  - New York of the South
  - NOLA
  - Paris of the South
  - Queen City of the South
  - The Queen of the Mississippi
  - Saint City
  - Super Bowl City
- Ponchatoula – Strawberry Capital of the World
- Rayne – Frog Capital of the World
- Shreveport – Ratchet City
- Slidell – The Camellia City (official), The Dell
- St. Martinville – Birthplace of Acadiana

== See also ==
- List of city nicknames in the United States
