= List of city nicknames in Turkey =

This partial list of city nicknames in Turkey compiles the aliases, sobriquets and slogans that cities in Turkey are known by (or have been known by historically), officially and unofficially, to locals, outsiders or their tourism boards or chambers of commerce.

- Adıyaman
  - "The Land of the Great Statues"
- Ankara
  - "Heart of Turkey"
- Ardahan
  - "Hidden Gem in Northeastern Turkey"
- Batman
  - "City of Festivals"
- Bingöl
  - "City of Thousand Lakes"
- Bitlis
  - "City of Five Minarets"
- Bursa
  - "Green Bursa"
- Dersim
  - "Silver Gate"
- Diyarbakır
  - "Amad" and "City of Watermelons"
- Erzincan
  - "Gem of Eastern Turkey"
- Hakkâri
  - "City of Pomegranates"
- Iğdır
  - "Jewel of Eastern Anatolia"
- Istanbul
  - "Augusta Antonina"
  - "New Rome" / "Second Rome"
  - "Dersaadet" (در سعادت 'Gate of Felicity')
  - "Derâliye" (در عاليه 'Sublime Gate') Der being the Persian word for door
  - "Bâb-ı Âlî" (باب العالی 'The Sublime Porte')
  - "Pâyitaht" (پایتخت, 'The Seat of the Throne')
  - "Asitane" (آستانه, From Persian 'The Doorstep' of the Sultan/Government or 'The Center' of Ottoman Empire).
- İzmir
  - "Pearl of Aegean"
  - "Gâvur İzmir" (Infidel Izmir)
- Kars
  - "Bride of Turkey"
- Mardin
  - "City of Historical Texture and Architecture"
- Muş
  - "City of Tulips"
- Siirt
  - "City of Vibrant Nightlife"
- Şanlıurfa
  - "City of Prophet Ibrahim (Abraham)" and "Realm of Prophets"
- Şırnak
  - "City of Noah's Ark"
- Van
  - "Pearl of the East"
