= List of city nicknames in Idaho =

This partial list of city nicknames in Idaho compiles the aliases, sobriquets and slogans that cities are known by (or have been known by historically), officially and unofficially, to municipal governments, local people, outsiders or their tourism boards or chambers of commerce. City nicknames can help in establishing a civic identity, helping outsiders recognize a community or attracting people to a community because of its nickname; promote civic pride; and build community unity. Nicknames and slogans that successfully create a new community "ideology or myth" are also believed to have economic value. Their economic value is difficult to measure, but there are anecdotal reports of cities that have achieved substantial economic benefits by "branding" themselves by adopting new slogans.

Some unofficial nicknames are positive, while others are derisive. The unofficial nicknames listed here have been in use for a long time or have gained wide currency.

- Ashton – Seed Potato Capital
- Blackfoot – Potato Capital of the World
- Boise
  - City of Trees
  - Spud City
- Buhl – Trout Capitol
- Coeur d'Alene
  - Lake City
  - CDA (colloquial)
- Pocatello
  - Gate City
  - Poky
- Wallace – Silver Capital of the World
- Wendell – Hub City of the Magic Valley

== See also ==
- List of city nicknames in the United States
