= List of city nicknames in Montana =

This partial list of city nicknames in Montana compiles the aliases, sobriquets and slogans that cities in Montana are known by (or have been known by historically), officially and unofficially, to municipal governments, local people, outsiders or their tourism boards or chambers of commerce. City nicknames can help in establishing a civic identity, helping outsiders recognize a community or attracting people to a community because of its nickname; promote civic pride; and build community unity. Nicknames and slogans that successfully create a new community "ideology or myth" are also believed to have economic value. Their economic value is difficult to measure, but there are anecdotal reports of cities that have achieved substantial economic benefits by "branding" themselves by adopting new slogans.

Some unofficial nicknames are positive, while others are derisive. The unofficial nicknames listed here have been in use for a long time or have gained wide currency.

- Billings
  - The Magic City
  - Montana's Trailhead
  - Montana's City
  - Star of the Big Sky Country
  - B-Town. A recently-trending, popular unofficial nickname for Billings is "B-Town". Although the names of three of Montana's largest cities, Billings, Bozeman, & Butte all start with "B", Billings is the city associated, especially on social media, with the nickname "B-town". Another example of Billings' interesting monopoly of the letter "B" in its monikers can be found in reference to MSU-B, née Eastern Montana University, the largest college or university in Billings, which merged, as part of the 1994 reorganization of Montana's state university system, with Montana State University, founded over 100 years prior in Bozeman, Montana. "Eastern" as her alumni nicknamed their alma mater, was then renamed and now known under her current name of Montana State University Billings, or MSUB, retaining mascot Yellowjackets while the original MSU in Bozeman retains original mascot (Golden)Bobcats, or "Cats", as popularly known. (see Cat-Griz/Griz-Cat game, Brawl of the Wild.)
- Bozeman – Bozangeles, The Bozone
- Butte
  - The Mining City
  - The Richest Hill on Earth
- Cut Bank – Coldest Spot in the Nation
- Glasgow – The middle of nowhere
- Glendive – Good People Surrounded by Badlands
- Great Falls – The Electric City
- Helena – Queen City of the Rockies
- Kalispell – Hub of the Valley
- Libby – City of Eagles
- Missoula – The Garden City, Zootown

== See also ==
- List of city nicknames in the United States
