= List of city nicknames in Wyoming =

This partial list of city nicknames in Wyoming compiles the aliases, sobriquets and slogans that cities in Wyoming are known by (or have been known by historically), officially and unofficially, to municipal governments, local people, outsiders or their tourism boards or chambers of commerce. City nicknames can help in establishing a civic identity, helping outsiders recognize a community or attracting people to a community because of its nickname; promote civic pride; and build community unity. Nicknames and slogans that successfully create a new community "ideology or myth" are also believed to have economic value. Their economic value is difficult to measure, but there are anecdotal reports of cities that have achieved substantial economic benefits by "branding" themselves by adopting new slogans.

Some unofficial nicknames are positive, while others are derisive. The unofficial nicknames listed here have been in use for a long time or have gained wide currency.

- Casper – Oil City
- Cheyenne – The Magic City of the Plains.
- Cody – Rodeo Capital of the World
- Douglas – Jackalope Capital of the World.
- Laramie – Gem City of the Plains.
- Lovell – The Rose City of Wyoming
- Meeteetse
  - Ferret Capital of the World.
  - Where Chiefs Meet
- Riverton – Excellence in service to the Rendezvous City
- Rock Springs – Home of 56 Nationalities
- Saratoga – Where the Trout Leap in Main Street
- Upton – The Best Town on Earth
- Sheridan- The Emerald City

== See also ==
- List of city nicknames in the United States
