= List of city nicknames in Hawaii =

This partial list of city nicknames in Hawaii compiles the aliases, sobriquets and slogans that cities in Hawaii are known by (or have been known by historically), officially and unofficially, to municipal governments, local people, outsiders or their tourism boards or chambers of commerce. City nicknames can help in establishing a civic identity, helping outsiders recognize a community or attracting people to a community because of its nickname; promote civic pride; and build community unity. Nicknames and slogans that successfully create a new community "ideology or myth" are also believed to have economic value. Their economic value is difficult to measure, but there are anecdotal reports of cities that have achieved substantial economic benefits by "branding" themselves by adopting new slogans.

== Nicknames ==
Hilo
America’s Wettest City
Orchid Capital
Honolulu
The Big Pineapple
Pacific Diamond

== See also ==
- List of city nicknames in the United States
