= List of city nicknames in Maryland =

This partial list of city nicknames in Maryland compiles the aliases, sobriquets and slogans that cities in Maryland are known by (or have been known by historically), officially and unofficially, to municipal governments, local people, outsiders or their tourism boards or chambers of commerce. City nicknames can help in establishing a civic identity, helping outsiders recognize a community or attracting people to a community because of its nickname; promote civic pride; and build community unity. Nicknames and slogans that successfully create a new community "ideology or myth" are also believed to have economic value. Their economic value is difficult to measure, but there are anecdotal reports of cities that have achieved substantial economic benefits by "branding" themselves by adopting new slogans.

Some unofficial nicknames are positive, while others are derisive. The unofficial nicknames listed here have been in use for a long time or have gained wide currency.

== List of nicknames ==
- Annapolis
  - Crabtown
  - Naptown
- Baltimore
  - America's Comeback City
  - Bodymore, Murdaland
  - Charm City
  - The City of Firsts
  - The City That Reads
  - Crab Cake Capital of the World
  - The Greatest City in America
  - Harm City
  - Mobtown
  - Monument City
- Columbia – The Next America
- Crisfield – Seafood Capital of the World
- Cumberland – Queen City of the Alleghenies
- Ellicott City – Little Sneedville
- Frederick
  - Key City
- Hagerstown
  - Hub City
  - Maryland's Gateway to the West
- Takoma Park
  - Azalea City
  - The People's Republic of Takoma Park

== See also ==
- List of city nicknames in the United States
