= List of city nicknames in Utah =

This partial list of city nicknames in Utah compiles the aliases, sobriquets and slogans that cities in Utah are known by (or have been known by historically), officially and unofficially, to municipal governments, local people, outsiders or their tourism boards or chambers of commerce. City nicknames can help in establishing a civic identity, helping outsiders recognize a community or attracting people to a community because of its nickname; promote civic pride; and build community unity. Nicknames and slogans that successfully create a new community "ideology or myth" are also believed to have economic value. Their economic value is difficult to measure, but there are anecdotal reports of cities that have achieved substantial economic benefits by "branding" themselves by adopting new slogans.

Some unofficial nicknames are positive, while others are derisive. The unofficial nicknames listed here have been in use for a long time or have gained wide currency.

- Cedar City – Festival City USA
- Cottonwood Heights – City between the Canyons
- Green River – The World's Watermelon Capital
- Kanab
  - Utah's Little Hollywood
  - Greatest Earth on Show
- Orem – Family City USA
- Provo – Happy Valley
- Salt Lake City
  - City of the Saints
  - Crossroads of the West
  - Small Lake City
  - Smog Lake City
- Springville – Art City

== See also ==
- List of city nicknames in the United States
