= List of city nicknames in Connecticut =

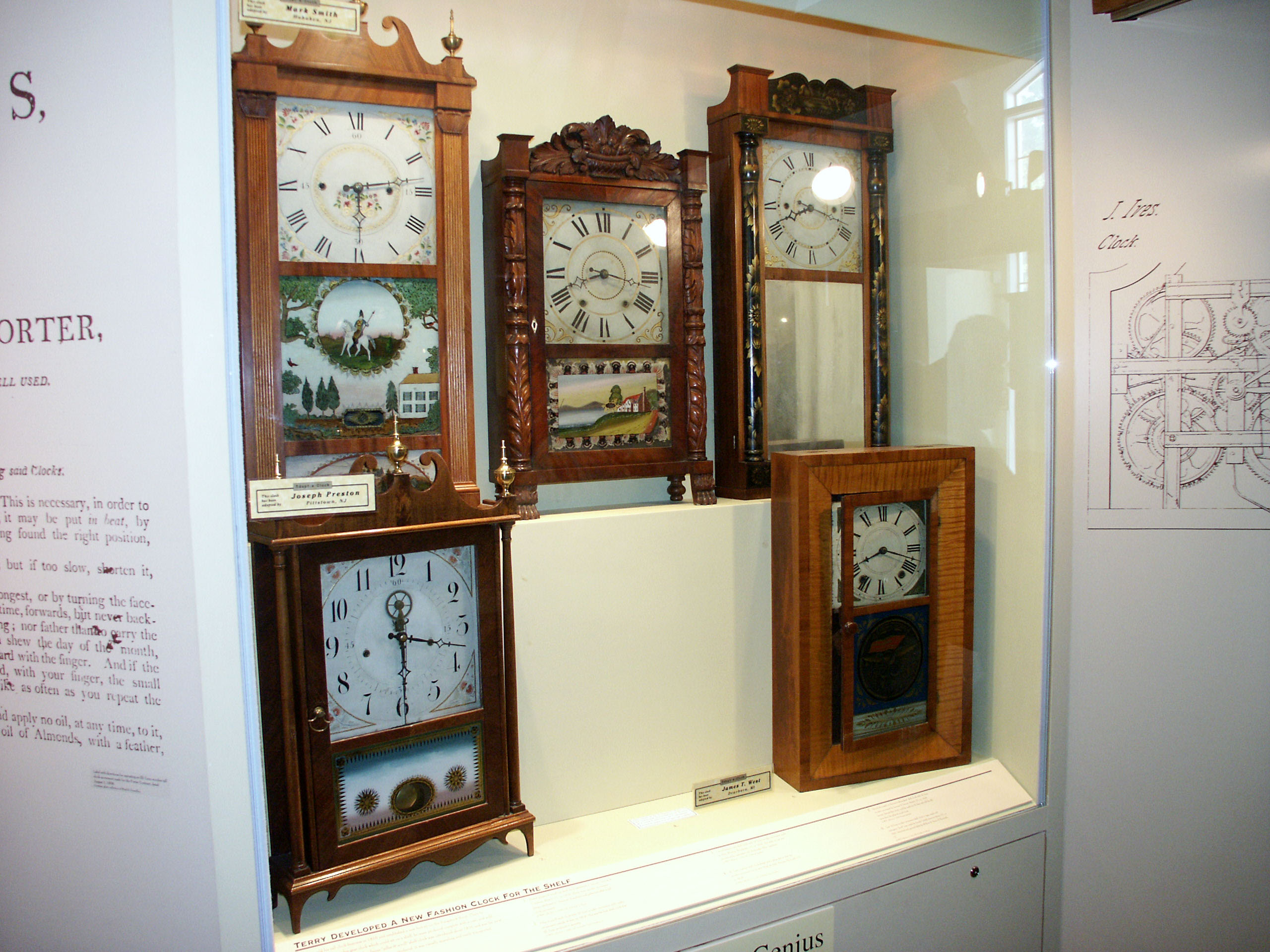
Several Connecticut community nicknames celebrate a local history of manufacturing various products, such as these Connecticut-made clocks on display in the American Clock & Watch Museum in Bristol.

This partial list of city nicknames in Connecticut compiles the aliases, sobriquets and slogans that Connecticut cities and towns are known by (or have been known by historically), officially and unofficially, to municipal governments, local people, outsiders or their tourism boards or chambers of commerce. City nicknames can help in establishing a civic identity, helping outsiders recognize a community or attracting people to a community because of its nickname; promote civic pride; and build community unity. Nicknames and slogans that successfully create a new community "ideology or myth" are also believed to have economic value. Their economic value is difficult to measure, but there are anecdotal reports of cities that have achieved substantial economic benefits by "branding" themselves with new slogans.

Some unofficial nicknames are positive, while others are derisive. The unofficial nicknames listed here have been in use for a long time or have gained wide currency.

- Ansonia – The Copper City
- Berlin – Geographic Center of Connecticut
- Bethlehem – The Christmas Town
- Bridgeport – The Park City
- Bristol
  - Clock City
  - Mum City
- Cheshire – Bedding Plant Capital of Connecticut
- Danbury – Hat City
- Derby – Connecticut's Smallest City
- East Hampton – Belltown USA
- Groton – Submarine Capital of the World
- Hamden – Land of the Sleeping Giant
- Hartford
  - Insurance Capital of the World
  - Homicide Hartford
- Manchester – Silk City
- Meriden – Silver City
- Middletown – Forest City
- Naugatuck – Rubber City
- New Britain
  - Hardware City
  - Hard-hittin' New Britain
- New Haven – The Elm City (reported in the 1880s as City of Elms)
- New London - The Whaling City
- Norwich – Rose City or The Rose of New England
- Stamford
  - Lock City (a reference to the now-defunct Yale & Towne lock factory)
  - "The City that Works!"
- Waterbury – The Brass City
- West Haven – Connecticut's Friendliest City
- Willimantic – Thread City
- Winsted – Laurel City

== See also ==
- Administrative divisions of Connecticut
- List of city nicknames in the United States
- List of municipalities of Connecticut by population
