= List of city nicknames in Nevada =

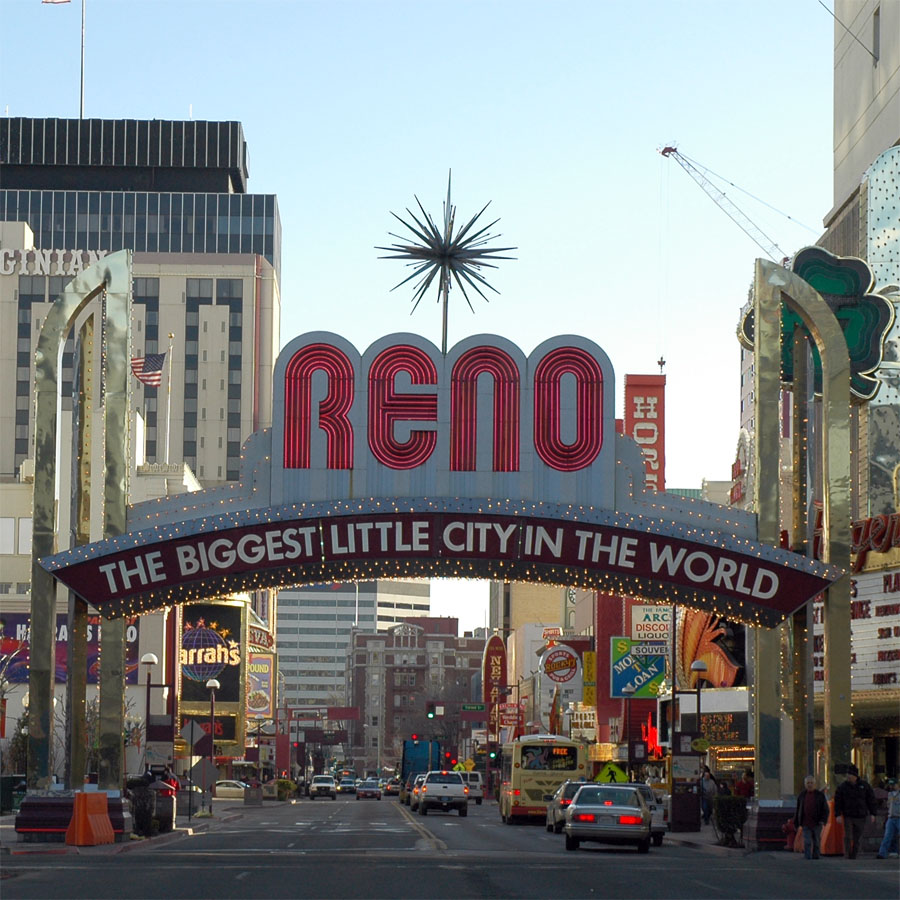
Reno proudly displays its nickname as "The Biggest Little City in the World" on a large sign above a downtown street.

This partial list of city nicknames in Nevada compiles the aliases, sobriquets and slogans that cities and towns in Nevada are known by (or have been known by historically), officially and unofficially, to municipal governments, local people, outsiders or their tourism boards or chambers of commerce. City nicknames can help in establishing a civic identity, helping outsiders recognize a community or attracting people to a community because of its nickname; promote civic pride; and build community unity. Nicknames and slogans that successfully create a new community "ideology or myth" are also believed to have economic value. Their economic value is difficult to measure, but there are anecdotal reports of cities that have achieved substantial economic benefits by "branding" themselves by adopting new slogans.

In 2005 the consultancy Tagline Guru conducted a small survey of professionals in the fields of branding, marketing, and advertising aimed at identifying the "best" U.S. city slogans and nicknames. Participants evaluated about 800 nicknames and 400 slogans on the criteria of whether the nickname or slogan expresses the "brand character, affinity, style, and personality" of the city, whether it "tells a story in a clever, fun, and memorable way," uniqueness and originality, and whether it "inspires you to visit there, live there, or learn more." The second-ranked nickname in the survey was the Las Vegas nickname "Sin City", behind only New York City's "The Big Apple." Las Vegas also had the top-rated slogan: "What Happens Here, Stays Here."

Some unofficial nicknames are positive, while others are derisive. The unofficial nicknames listed here have been in use for a long time or have gained wide currency.

- Beatty – Gateway to Death Valley
- Boulder City – Home of Hoover Dam
- Caliente – City of Roses
- Carson City - The Double C
- Eureka – The Friendliest Town on The Loneliest Road
- Fallon – The Oasis of Nevada
- Genoa – Home of the Candy Dance
- Las Vegas
  - Gambling Capital of the World
  - The Entertainment Capital of the World
  - Sin City
  - City of Lost Wages
  - The V
- Reno
  - The Biggest Little City in the World
  - The Neon Babylon
  - The Big R
- Sparks – The Rail City
- Tonopah – Queen of the Silver Camps
- Virginia City – The Richest Place on Earth
- West Wendover – Where the West Begins
- Winnemucca – City of Paved Streets
- Yerington – The Onion Capital of the West

== See also ==
- List of cities in Nevada
- List of city nicknames in the United States
