= List of city nicknames in Vermont =

This partial list of city nicknames in Vermont compiles the aliases, sobriquets and slogans that cities, towns, and villages in Vermont are known by (or have been known by historically), officially and unofficially, to municipal governments, local people, outsiders or their tourism boards or chambers of commerce. City nicknames can help in establishing a civic identity, helping outsiders recognize a community or attracting people to a community because of its nickname; promote civic pride; and build community unity. Nicknames and slogans that successfully create a new community "ideology or myth" are also believed to have economic value. Their economic value is difficult to measure, but there are anecdotal reports of cities that have achieved substantial economic benefits by "branding" themselves by adopting new slogans.

Some unofficial nicknames are positive, while others are derisive. The unofficial nicknames listed here have been in use for a long time or have gained wide currency.

- Barre
  - Granite Capital of the World.
  - Scary Barre (derogatory)
- Burlington
  - The Queen City.
  - The People's Republic of Burlington (used when Bernie Sanders was mayor).
  - B-town
  - Burly
  - 'Lington
  - Girlington
- Colchester
  - Redneck Riviera
- The Mad River Valley
  - The Bad Liver Valley
- Middlesex/Moretown
  - Moresex
- Montpelier
  - Montpeculiar
  - Monty-P
- Rutland
  - The Marble City
  - RutVegas.
- St. Albans
  - Rail City
  - Snalbans
- White River Junction – River City
- Winooski
  - The Onion City
  - Burlington's Brooklyn
  - 'Noosk
- Wallingford - Wally World

== See also ==
- List of city nicknames in the United States
