= List of city nicknames in South Carolina =

This partial list of city nicknames in South Carolina compiles the aliases, sobriquets and slogans that cities in South Carolina are known by (or have been known by historically), officially and unofficially, to municipal governments, local people, outsiders or their tourism boards or chambers of commerce. City nicknames can help in establishing a civic identity, helping outsiders recognize a community or attracting people to a community because of its nickname; promote civic pride; and build community unity. Nicknames and slogans that successfully create a new community "ideology or myth" are also believed to have economic value. Their economic value is difficult to measure, but there are anecdotal reports of cities that have achieved substantial economic benefits by "branding" themselves by adopting new slogans.

Some unofficial nicknames are positive, while others are derisive. Many of the unofficial nicknames listed here have been in use for a long time or have gained wide currency.

- Abbeville
  - Pretty. Near. Perfect.
  - "The Birthplace and Deathbed of the Confederacy"
- Aiken
  - "A Place Like No Other"
  - The Winter Colony
- Aynor Little Golden Town
- Anderson – The Electric City
- Barnwell – Gateway to the Low Country
- Blacksburg – The Iron City
- Bluffton – Heart of the Lowcountry
- Calhoun Falls- “A Town of Opportunity” a.k.a. Lil Miami, C Town
- Charleston
  - Chucktown
  - The Chuck
  - The Big Sweet Grass Basket
  - The Holy City
- Cheraw
  - The Prettiest Town in Dixie
- Chesterfield
  - The Heart of the Carolinas
- Clemson
  - Tiger Town
  - Title Town
  - Cow Town
- Columbia
  - The Capital of Southern Hospitality
  - Cola City/Town
  - River City
  - Soda City
  - Capital City
- Elgin – Home of the Catfish Stomp
  - Paris of the Midlands
- Florence
  - Flo-Town
  - Magic City
- Greenville
  - Textile Capital of the World (formerly)
  - G-Vegas/Green Vegas
  - GVL
- Greenwood – The Emerald City
- Hilton Head Island - Snow Island
- Irmo
  - Home of the Okra Strut
  - Gateway to Lake Murray
- Lancaster – The Red Rose City
- Myrtle Beach – Golf Capital of the World
- North Augusta – South Carolina's Riverfront
- Orangeburg – The Garden City
- Pageland – The Watermelon Capital of the World
- Rock Hill – The Gateway to South Carolina
- Ruby
  - Jewel City of the South
- Spartanburg
  - The Hub City
  - Sparkle City
- Sumter – The Gamecock City
- Walterboro - "The Front Porch of the Lowcountry"
- Winnsboro – Rock City
- York - The White Rose City

== See also ==
- List of city nicknames in the United States
