= List of city nicknames in Missouri =

This partial list of city nicknames in Missouri compiles the aliases, sobriquets and slogans that cities in Missouri are known by (or have been known by historically), officially and unofficially, to municipal governments, local people, outsiders or their tourism boards or chambers of commerce. City nicknames can help in establishing a civic identity, helping outsiders recognize a community or attracting people to a community because of its nickname; promote civic pride; and build community unity. Nicknames and slogans that successfully create a new community "ideology or myth" are also believed to have economic value. Their economic value is difficult to measure, but there are anecdotal reports of cities that have achieved substantial economic benefits by "branding" themselves by adopting new slogans.

Some unofficial nicknames are positive, while others are derisive. The unofficial nicknames listed here have been in use for a long time or have gained wide currency.

- Branson
  - Las Vegas If Ned Flanders Ran It
- Brunswick – Home of the World's Largest Pecan
- Carthage – The Maple Leaf City
- Chillicothe – Home of Sliced Bread
- Columbia
  - Bocomo
  - The Havana on the Hinkson
  - The Athens of Missouri
  - CoMo
- Cuba – Mural City
- Hannibal
  - America's Hometown
  - The Bluff City
- Independence – Where the Trails Start and the Buck Stops
- Jefferson City
  - City of Thomas Jefferson
  - J.C.
  - Jeff
- Kansas City
  - BBQ Capital of the World
  - City of Fountains
  - Cowtown
  - Jazz Capital of the World
  - K.C. (inspiring the nickname of Casey Stengel, among others)
  - KCMO
  - Paris of the Plains
- King City – The Gem of the Highway
- Kirkwood – The Green Tree City
- Lathrop – Mule Capital of the World
- Marionville – Home of the White Squirrels
- Moberly – Magic City
- Neosho – Flower Box City
- Nixa – Home of Jason Bourne
- Peculiar – Where the Odds Are with You
- St. Louis
  - Chess Capital of the World
  - Gateway to the West
  - Lion of the Valley
  - The Lou
  - Mound City
  - River City
  - Rome of the West
  - There's More Than Meets the Arch
- Salem – Charcoal Capital of the World
- Sedalia – The Queen City of the Prairie
- Springfield
  - Birthplace of Route 66
  - Queen City of the Ozarks
- Sumner – Wild Goose Capital of the World
- Warrensburg – The Burg
- Washington – Corn Cob Pipe Capital of the World

== See also ==
- List of city nicknames in the United States
