= List of city nicknames in North Dakota =

This partial list of city nicknames in North Dakota compiles the aliases, sobriquets, and slogans that cities in North Dakota are known by (or have been known by historically), officially and unofficially, to municipal governments, local people, outsiders or their tourism boards or chambers of commerce. City nicknames can help in establishing a civic identity, helping outsiders recognize a community or attracting people to a community because of its nickname; promote civic pride; and build community unity. Nicknames and slogans that successfully create a new community "ideology or myth" are also believed to have economic value. Their economic value is difficult to measure, but there are anecdotal reports of cities that have achieved substantial economic benefits by "branding" themselves by adopting new slogans.

Some unofficial nicknames are positive, while others are derisive. The unofficial nicknames listed here have been in use for a long time or have gained wide currency.

- Cando – You Can Do Better in Cando
- Dickinson – Queen City or Queen City of the Prairies
- Drayton – Catfish Capital of the North
- Hebron – The Brick City
- Jamestown – The Buffalo City
- Minot – The Magic City
- Ray – Grain Palace City
- Rugby – Geographical Center of North America
- St. John – City at the end of the Rainbow
- Towner – Cattle Capital of North Dakota
- Velva - The Star City

== See also ==
- List of city nicknames in the United States
