= List of city nicknames in Kansas =

This partial list of city nicknames in Kansas compiles the aliases, sobriquets and slogans that cities in Kansas are known by (or have been known by historically), officially and unofficially, to municipal governments, local people, outsiders or their tourism boards or chambers of commerce. City nicknames can help in establishing a civic identity, helping outsiders recognize a community or attracting people to a community because of its nickname; promote civic pride; and build community unity. Nicknames and slogans that successfully create a new community "ideology or myth" are also believed to have economic value. Their economic value is difficult to measure, but there are anecdotal reports of cities that have achieved substantial economic benefits by "branding" themselves by adopting new slogans.

Some unofficial nicknames are positive, while others are derisive. The unofficial nicknames listed here have been in use for a long time or have gained wide currency.

- Baxter Springs – First Cowtown in Kansas
- Beattie – Milo Capital of the World
- Cassoday – Prairie Chicken Capital of the World
- Cawker City – Home of the World's Largest Ball of Twine
- Dodge City
  - Queen of the Cowtowns
  - The Wickedest Little City in America
- Emporia – Front Porch of the Flint Hills
- Garden City – Cutting Horse Capital
- Girard – Printing Capital of the Nation
- Haysville – Peach Capital of Kansas
- Jennings – Czech Us Out
- Kansas City
  - KCK
  - Heart of America
- Kirwin – Goose Capital
- La Crosse – Barbed Wire Capital of the World
- Lansing – City With a Future
- Lawrence
  - River City
  - LFK
- Lenexa – Spinach Capital
- Leoti – Pinto Bean Capital
- Liberal – The Land of Oz
- Lindsborg – Little Sweden
- Manhattan – The Little Apple
- Marion
  - Rhino Capital of Kansas
  - Town Between Two Lakes
- Marysville – Black Squirrel Capital
- Norton – Pheasant Capital of Kansas
- Olathe – Cowboy Boot Capital
- Parsons – Purple Martin Capital
- Pittsburg – Fried Chicken Capital
- Quinter – Half Mile High City
- Russell Springs – Cow Chip Capital of Kansas
- Topeka – Top City
- Wellington – Wheat Capital of the World
- Wichita
  - Air Capital of the World
  - The Emerald City
  - ICT
- Wilson – Czech Capital of Kansas
- Windom – Covered Dish Capital of the World

== See also ==
- List of cities in Kansas
- List of city nicknames in the United States
