= List of city nicknames in Pennsylvania =

This partial list of city nicknames in Pennsylvania compiles the aliases, sobriquets and slogans that cities, boroughs, and towns in Pennsylvania are known by (or have been known by historically), officially and unofficially, to municipal governments, local people, outsiders or their tourism boards or chambers of commerce. City nicknames can help in establishing a civic identity, helping outsiders recognize a community or attracting people to a community because of its nickname; promote civic pride; and build community unity.

Nicknames and slogans that successfully create a new community "ideology or myth" are also believed to have economic value. Their economic value is difficult to measure, but there are anecdotal reports of cities that have achieved substantial economic benefits by "branding" themselves by adopting new slogans.

Some unofficial nicknames are positive, while others are derisive. Many of the unofficial nicknames listed here have been in use for a long time or have gained wide currency.

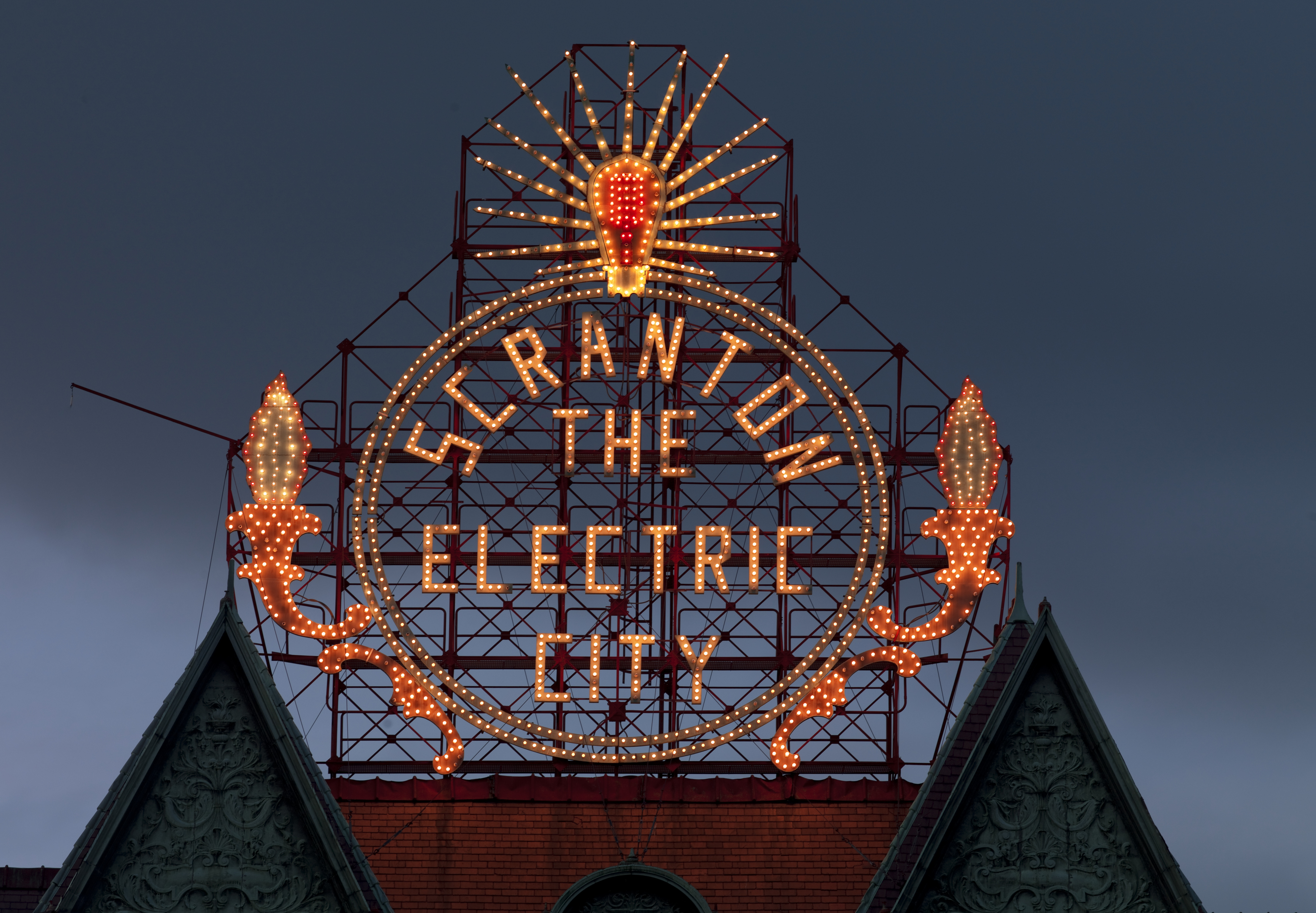
A sign proclaiming Scranton as "The Electric City" overlooks Courthouse Square. The city got its moniker for being the site of the nation's first electric-powered streetcars.

- Allentown
  - A Town
  - Band City USA
  - Peanut City
  - Silk City
  - The Queen City
  - Truck Capital of the World
- Bethlehem
  - Christmas City U.S.A.
- Erie
  - The Flagship City
  - The Gem City
- Hanover
  - Snack capital of the world
- Hershey
  - Chocolate capital of the world
  - Chocolate Town
  - The sweetest place on Earth
- Indiana
  - Christmas tree capital of the world
- Johnstown
  - Flood City
  - The Friendly City
  - The Dirty J
- Lancaster
  - The Red Rose City
- 'New Castle'
  - Fireworks Capital
- Philadelphia
  - Filthadelphia or Filthydelphia
  - Killadelphia
  - Philly
  - The City of Brotherly Love
  - The Great Fighting City of Philadelphia
  - The Place That Loves You Back
- Pittsburgh
  - Birmingham of America
  - The 'Burgh
  - The City of Bridges
  - City of champions
  - Iron City
  - Shitsburgh
  - Steel City
  - The Smoky City
- Punxsutawney
  - Weather capital of the world
- Reading
  - Baseballtown
  - Pretzel capital of the world
  - Pretzel City
- Scranton
  - The Electric City
  - The Anthracite Capital of the world
  - The All America City
  - Steamtown
- State College
  - Happy Valley
- Wilkes-Barre
  - Diamond City
- York
  - The White Rose City

== See also ==
- List of city nicknames in the United States
