= Sports in Detroit =

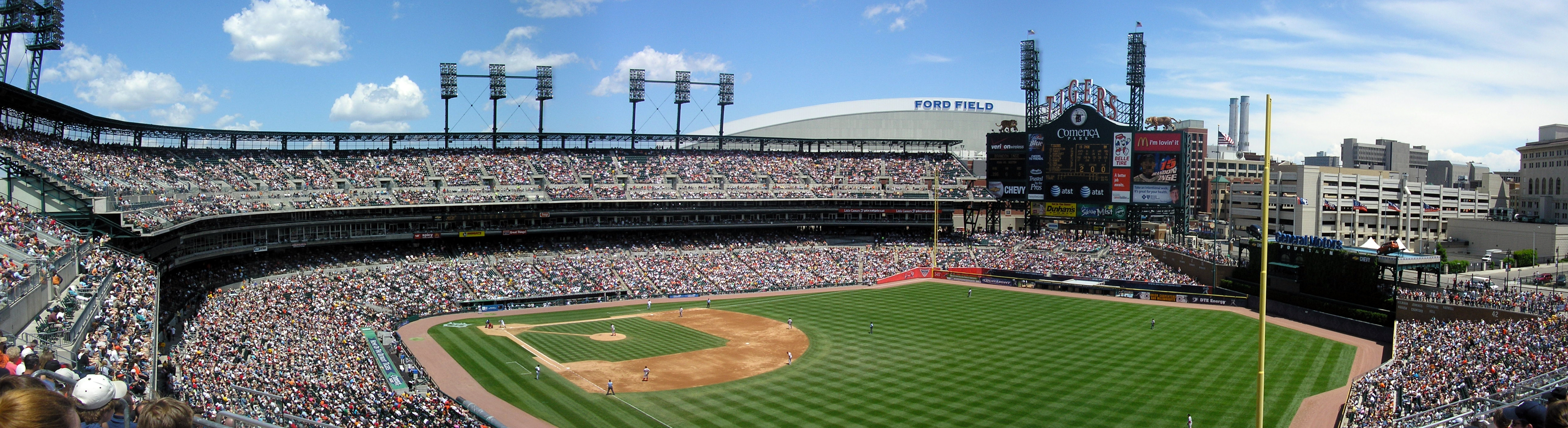
Comerica Park, home of the American League Detroit Tigers

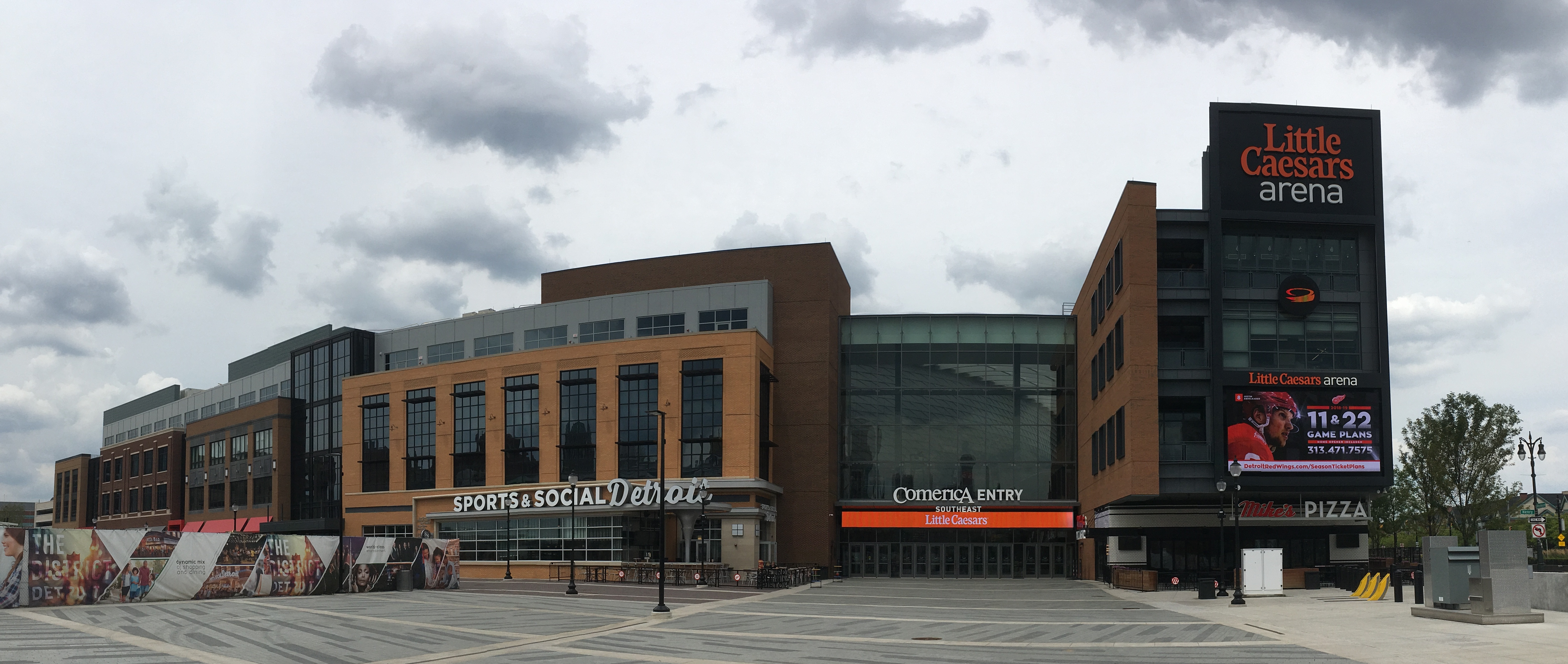
Little Caesars Arena, home of the Detroit Pistons and Detroit Red Wings.

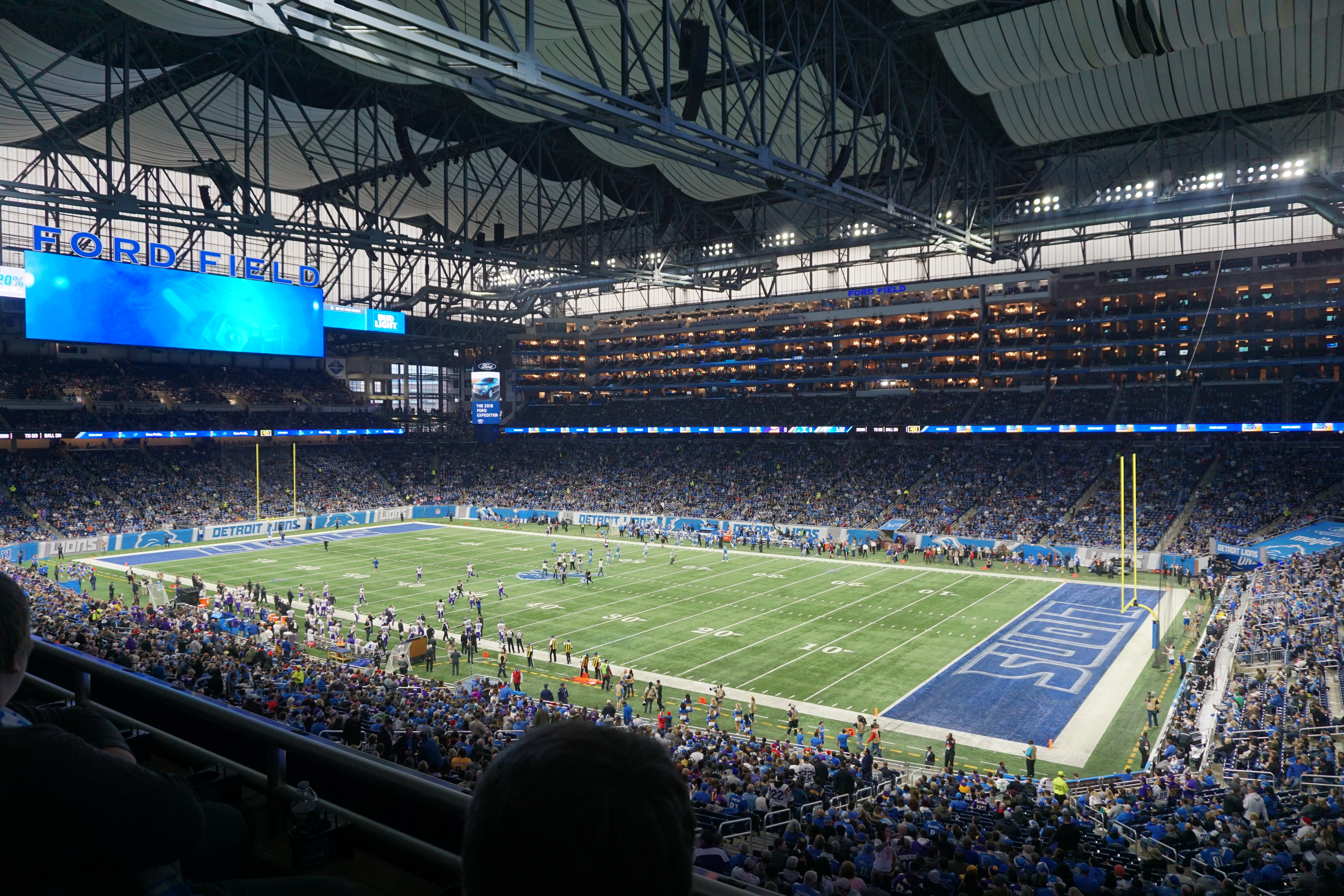
Ford Field, home of the Detroit Lions

Detroit is home to four professional U.S. sports teams; it is one of twelve cities in the United States to have teams from the "Big Four" major professional sports leagues in the United States and Canada. Since 2017, it is the only U.S. city to have its MLB, NBA, NFL, and NHL teams play within its downtown district (broadly defined) (Note: Little Caesars Arena, home to the Pistons and Red Wings, is technically in Midtown Detroit, a distinct neighborhood from downtown, but lies within blocks of the city's other two major venues, Comerica Park and Ford Field.) and one of only four U.S. cities to have said teams play within the city limits of their namesake.

All four teams compete within the city of Detroit. There are three active major sports venues within the city: 41,782-seat Comerica Park (home of the Detroit Tigers), 65,000-seat Ford Field (home of the Detroit Lions), and Little Caesars Arena (home of the Detroit Red Wings and Detroit Pistons). Detroit is known for its avid hockey fans. Interest in the sport has given the city the moniker "Hockeytown". In 2008, the Tigers reported 3.2 million visitors with a 98.6 percent attendance rate.

In college sports, the University of Detroit Mercy has an National Collegiate Athletic Association (NCAA) Division I program. Wayne State University has a Division II program, and once had Division I teams in men's and women's ice hockey but has since dropped both sports.

== Major league sports ==
| Team | League | Sport | Venue (capacity) | Founded | Titles |
|---|---|---|---|---|---|
| Detroit Lions | NFL | American football | Ford Field (65,000) | 1928 | 4 (Note: The Lions have not won any Super Bowls, but were NFL champions four times (1935, 1952, 1953, 1957) in the pre-Super Bowl era.) |
| Detroit Tigers | MLB | Baseball | Comerica Park (41,299) | 1894 | 4 |
| Detroit Pistons | NBA | Basketball | Little Caesars Arena (20,491) | 1937 | 3 |
| Detroit Red Wings | NHL | Hockey | Little Caesars Arena (19,515) | 1926 | 11 |
| Detroit Amps | BIG3 | Basketball | Little Caesars Arena (19,000) | 2024 | 0 |
| Detroit WNBA team | WNBA | Basketball | Little Caesars Arena (20,491) | 2029 | 0 |
| Detroit Clutch | PWHL | Hockey | Little Caesars Arena (19,515) | 2026 | 0 |

On July 12, 2005, Comerica Park hosted that year's Major League Baseball All-Star Game, and Ford Field hosted Super Bowl XL on February 5, 2006. Comerica Park hosted games 1 and 2 of the 2006 World Series, as well as games 3 and 4 of the 2012 World Series.

The Palace held NBA Finals games 3, 4 and 5 in both 2004 and 2005, and also hosted all but two home games of the Detroit Shock (now known as the Dallas Wings) in that franchise's four WNBA Finals appearances while based in the Detroit area (championships in 2003, 2006, and 2008, plus a losing appearance in 2007). The two exceptions were the title-clinching victories in 2006 and 2008, which both took place elsewhere due to scheduling conflicts—Joe Louis Arena in 2006 and the Eastern Michigan University Convocation Center in Ypsilanti in 2008.

In addition, the 2014 NHL Winter Classic was played on January 1, at Michigan Stadium in Ann Arbor. The Alumni Game and college and amateur hockey games were played on an ice surface at Comerica Park.

=== City of Champions (1930s) ===
Detroit was given the name "City of Champions" in the 1930s, for a series of successes both in individual and in team sport. The Detroit Lions won the National Football League championship in 1935. The Detroit Tigers won the American League pennant in 1934 and again in 1935, subsequently winning the World Series in 1935. The Detroit Red Wings won the National Hockey League's Stanley Cup in 1936 and 1937. This meant Detroit featured the defending champions in the NFL, NHL and MLB simultaneously from April 11, 1936 through October 5, 1936. Detroit remains the only city to win three major professional sports championships in the same year and until 2020 the only city to win NHL and NFL titles in the same year (a feat it repeated in 1952).

In individual sports, Gar Wood (a native Detroiter) won the Harmsworth Trophy for unlimited powerboat racing on the Detroit River in 1931. In the following year, Eddie "the Midnight Express" Tolan, a black sprinter who had graduated from Detroit's Cass Technical High School in 1927, won the 100- and 200-meter races and two gold medals at the 1932 Summer Olympics. Boxer Joe Louis, who came to Detroit when he was 12 years old and started his professional career in the city, won the heavyweight championship of the world in 1937.

April 18, 2011 was the 75th anniversary of Champions Day in Michigan.

== College sports ==
The following table shows the NCAA Division I and Division II college sports programs in the metro Detroit area:

| Team | Division | Conference | Venue | Location |
|---|---|---|---|---|
| Michigan Wolverines | Division I (FBS) | Big Ten Conference | various, including Michigan Stadium and Crisler Center | Ann Arbor |
| Michigan State Spartans | Division I (FBS) | Big Ten Conference | various, including Spartan Stadium, Breslin Student Events Center, and Munn Ice Arena | East Lansing |
| Eastern Michigan Eagles | Division I (FBS) | Mid-American Conference | various, including Rynearson Stadium and EMU Convocation Center | Ypsilanti |
| Detroit Mercy Titans | Division I | Horizon League | various, including Calihan Hall | Detroit |
| Oakland Golden Grizzlies | Division I | Horizon League | various, including Athletics Center O'rena | Rochester |
| Wayne State Warriors | Division II | Great Lakes | various, including Wayne State Fieldhouse | Detroit |

There are also numerous small college athletic programs in the Detroit Metro area.

| School | Team | Division | Conference | City |
|---|---|---|---|---|
| Adrian College | Adrian Bulldogs | Division III | Michigan Intercollegiate Athletic Association | Adrian |
| Cleary University | Cleary Cougars | NAIA | Independent | Howell |
| Concordia University | Concordia Cardinals | NAIA | Wolverine-Hoosier | Ann Arbor |
| University of Michigan–Dearborn | UM-Dearborn Wolverines | NAIA | Wolverine-Hoosier | Dearborn |
| Madonna University | Madonna Crusaders | NAIA | Wolverine-Hoosier | Livonia |
| Rochester Christian University | Rochester Warriors | NAIA | Wolverine-Hoosier | Rochester Hills |
| Lawrence Technological University | Lawrence Tech Blue Devils | NAIA | Wolverine-Hoosier | Southfield |
| Siena Heights University | Siena Heights Saints | NAIA | Wolverine-Hoosier | Adrian |
| Henry Ford College | Henry Ford Hawks | NJCAA | Michigan Community College Athletic Association | Dearborn |
| Macomb Community College | Macomb Monarchs | NJCAA | Michigan Community College Athletic Association | Warren |
| Oakland Community College | Oakland Owls | NJCAA | Michigan Community College Athletic Association | Waterford |
| St. Clair County Community College | St. Clair Skippers | NJCAA | Michigan Community College Athletic Association | Port Huron |
| Schoolcraft College | Schoolcraft Ocelots | NJCAA | Michigan Community College Athletic Association | Livonia |
| Wayne County Community College District | Wayne County Wildcats | NJCAA | Michigan Community College Athletic Association | Detroit |

On December 13, 2003, what was then the largest verified crowd in basketball history (78,129) packed Ford Field to watch the University of Kentucky defeat Michigan State University, 79–74. Ford Field hosted the Final Four of the 2009 NCAA Men's Division I Basketball Tournament.

The Frozen Four, the term for the semifinals and final of the NCAA Division I Men's Ice Hockey Tournament, was held at Ford Field on April 8 and 10, 2010.

== Events ==
Oakland Hills Country Club, located in the Detroit suburb of Bloomfield Township, has hosted numerous high-profile golf events. It has hosted the U.S. Open six times, most recently in 1996; the PGA Championship three times, most recently in 2008; the U.S. Senior Open in 1981 and 1991; the U.S. Amateur in 2002; and the Ryder Cup in 2004. The 2034 and 2051 U.S. Open are scheduled for Oakland Hills Country Club.

The Detroit Marathon is also organized annually in the city, usually held in October.

Detroit is home to the Detroit Indy Grand Prix. The race took place on the streets of downtown Detroit from 1982 until 1988, and then from 1989 (when the event switched disciplines from Formula One to Indy cars) at Belle Isle until now. The race was not held from 2002−2006.

The Virginia Slims of Detroit was a WTA Tour women's tennis tournament held from 1972 to 1983, which featured top ranked players such as Margaret Court, Billie Jean King, Chris Evert and Martina Navratilova.

The UFC 9 mixed martial arts event was held at Cobo Arena in 1996 and UFC 123 at the Palace of Auburn Hills in 2010.

The Palace of Auburn Hills held NCAA Division I Wrestling Tournament Finals on March 15–17, 2007.

The Professional Bowlers Association Lumber Liquidators PBA Tour holds the Motor City Classic at Taylor Lanes in the suburb of Taylor.

The suburb of Southfield hosts the annual Gold Cup Polo tournament at Word of Faith International Christian Center, formerly known as Duns Scotus College.

The city hosted the Red Bull Air Race in 2008 on the International Riverfront.

Detroit's Cobo Arena hosted the NCAA Division I men's Indoor Track and Field Championships competition from 1965-1981. The Pontiac Silverdome hosted the event 1982-1983.

=== Water sports ===
Sailboat racing is a major sport in the Detroit area. Lake Saint Clair is home to many yacht clubs which host regattas. Bayview Yacht Club, the Detroit Yacht Club, Crescent Sail Yacht Club, Grosse Pointe Yacht Club, The Windsor Yacht Club, and the Edison Boat Club each participate in and are governed by the Detroit Regional Yacht-Racing Association or DRYA. Detroit is home to many One-Design fleets including North American 40s, Cal 25s, Cuthbertson and Cassian 35s, Crescent Sailboats, Express 27s, J 120s, J 105, and Flying Scots. The Crescent Sailboat, NA-40, and the L boat were designed and built exclusively in Detroit. Detroit also has a very active and competitive junior sailing program.

Since 1904, the city has been home to the American Power Boat Association Gold Cup unlimited hydroplane boat race, held annually on the Detroit River near Belle Isle. Since 1916, the city has been home to Unlimited Hydroplane racing, held annually (with exceptions) on the Detroit River near Belle Isle. Often, the hydroplane boat race is for the APBA Challenge Cup, more commonly known as the Gold Cup (first awarded in 1904, created by Tiffany) which is the oldest active motorsport trophy in the world.

=== Olympic bids ===
Detroit has bid to host Summer Olympic Games seven times, more often than any other city which has not yet hosted. Detroit participated in International Olympic Committee elections for the 1944 (placing 3rd, behind bid winner London), 1952 (5th place, behind bid winner Helsinki), 1956 (4th place behind bid winner Melbourne), 1960 (3rd place behind bid winner Rome), 1964 (2nd place behind bid winner Tokyo), 1968 (2nd place behind bid winner Mexico City) and 1972 (4th place behind bid winner Munich) Games.

== Teams ==
=== Racing ===
| Club | Sport | League | Venue | Location |
|---|---|---|---|---|
| Detroit Indy Grand Prix | Auto racing | IndyCar Series | Belle Isle Park | Detroit |
| Gold Cup | Hydroplane racing | APBA | Detroit River | Detroit |

=== Other ===
| Club | Sport | League | Venue | Location |
|---|---|---|---|---|
| Michigan Stars FC | Soccer | NISA | Romeo High School | Romeo |
| Gold Star FC | Soccer | NISA | Madonna University | Livonia |
| Carpathia FC | Soccer | NPSL | Carpathia Club | Sterling Heights |
| Oakland County FC | Soccer | USL League Two | Royal Oak High School | Royal Oak |
| Utica Unicorns | Baseball | United Shore Professional Baseball League | Jimmy John's Field | Utica |
| Eastside Diamond Hoppers | Baseball | United Shore Professional Baseball League | Jimmy John's Field | Utica |
| Birmingham Bloomfield Beavers | Baseball | United Shore Professional Baseball League | Jimmy John's Field | Utica |
| Westside Woolly Mammoths | Baseball | United Shore Professional Baseball League | Jimmy John's Field | Utica |
| Motor City Cruise | Basketball | NBA G League | Wayne State Fieldhouse | Detroit |
| Detroit Coast II Coast All-Stars | Basketball | American Basketball Association | Cass Technical High School | Detroit |
| Motor City Firebirds | Basketball | American Basketball Association | Inkster Recreation Complex | Inkster |
| Oakland County Cowboys | Basketball | American Basketball Association | Walled Lake Central High School | Walled Lake |
| Team NetWork | Basketball | American Basketball Association | Romulus Athletic Center | Romulus |
| Motor City Lacrosse Club | Lacrosse | Midwest Cities Lacrosse Conference | Troy Athens High School | Troy |
| USA Hockey National Team Development Program | Ice Hockey | United States Hockey League | USA Hockey Arena | Plymouth, Michigan |
| Metro Jets | Ice Hockey | North American 3 Hockey League | Fraser Hockeyland | Fraser |
| Detroit Fighting Irish | Ice Hockey | United States Premier Hockey League | Brownstown Sports Arena | Brownstown |
| Motor City Hawks | Ice Hockey | United States Premier Hockey League | McCann Arena | Grosse Pointe |
| Detroit Coney Dogs | Indoor Lacrosse | Continental Indoor Lacrosse League | Inline Hockey Center | West Bloomfield |
| Alkali Surge | Inline Hockey | National Roller Hockey League | Joe Dumars Fieldhouse | Shelby Township |
| Alkali Revive | Inline Hockey | National Roller Hockey League | Jewish Community Center | West Bloomfield |
| Detroit Stars | Inline Hockey | National Roller Hockey League | Canfield Alkali Arena | Dearborn Heights |
| Detroit Bordercats | Inline Hockey | National Roller Hockey League | Joe Dumars Fieldhouse | Shelby Township |
| Detroit Diesels | Football | Great Lakes Football League | Robicaud High School | Detroit |
| Detroit Ravens | Football | Great Lakes Football League | Loyola High School | Detroit |
| Detroit Seminoles | Football | Great Lakes Football League | Memorial Park | Detroit |
| Michigan Hurricanes | Football | Great Lakes Football League | Fordson High School | Eastpointe |
| Motor City Sting | Football | Great Lakes Football League | N/A | Detroit |
| Renaissance City Chargers | Football | Great Midwest Football League | Detroit King High School | Detroit |
| Southern Michigan Timberwolves | Football | Great Lakes Football League | Navarre Field | Monroe |
| Detroit Red Dogs | Football | Great Lakes Football League | N/A | Detroit |
| Michigan Lightning | Football | Great Midwest Football League | Taylor Sportsplex | Taylor |
| Wayne County Bengals | Football | Great Midwest Football League | N/A | Highland Park |
| Detroit Roller Derby | Roller derby | WFTDA | Masonic Temple | Detroit |
| Detroit Tradesmen Rugby Club | Rugby union | USA Rugby | Glenn W. Levey Middle School | Detroit |
| Detroit Renegades | eSports | NA LCS, etc. | N/A | Detroit |
| Detroit rugby league team | Rugby league | AMNRL | N/A | Detroit |
| Detroit Wolfetones Gaelic Football | Gaelic Football | Gaelic Athletic Association | Flodin Park | Detroit |
| Detroit Innovators | Quadball | MLQ | N/A | Detroit |

== Former teams ==
| Club | League | Venue | Founded | Ended | Fate of team | Titles in Detroit |
|---|---|---|---|---|---|---|
| Detroit Wolverines | National League Baseball | Recreation Park | 1881 | 1888 | Team folded | 1 |
| Detroit Lightning | MISL | Cobo Arena | 1979 | 1980 | Team folded | 0 |
| Detroit Drive | AFL Arena Football | Joe Louis Arena | 1988 | 1993 | Team folded | 4 |
| Detroit Turbos | MILL Indoor Lacrosse | Joe Louis Arena | 1989 | 1994 | Team folded | 1 |
| Detroit Rockers | NPSL Indoor Soccer | Joe Louis Arena/ Compuware Arena/ The Palace of Auburn Hills | 1990 | 2001 | Team and League folded | 1 |
| Detroit Neon/Safari | CISL Indoor Soccer | The Palace of Auburn Hills | 1994 | 1997 | Team folded | 0 |
| Detroit Vipers | IHL Hockey | The Palace of Auburn Hills | 1994 | 2001 | Team and League folded | 1 |
| Detroit Fury | AFL Arena Football | The Palace of Auburn Hills | 2001 | 2004 | Team folded | 0 |
| Detroit Ignition | MISL/XSL Indoor Soccer | Compuware Arena | 2006 | 2009 | League folded | 1 |
| Detroit Cougars | NASL Soccer ^{*} | Tiger Stadium | 1968 | 1968 | Team folded | 0 |
| Detroit Express | NASL Soccer | Pontiac Silverdome | 1978 | 1981 | Washington Diplomats | 0 |
| Detroit Express | ASL Soccer | Pontiac Silverdome | 1981 | 1984 | League folded | 1 |
| Detroit Shock | WNBA Basketball | The Palace of Auburn Hills | 1998 | 2009 | Relocated to Tulsa as the Tulsa Shock; relocated again in 2016 as the Dallas Wings | 3 |
| Detroit Demolition | WPF Football | Livonia Franklin High School | 2002 | 2011 | Suspended play | 5 |
| Michigan Panthers | USFL Football | Pontiac Silverdome | 1983 | 1984 | Merged with the Oakland Invaders | 1 |
| Michigan Stags | WHA Hockey | Cobo Arena | 1974 | 1975 | Folded, league took over and became the Baltimore Blades | 0 |
| Detroit Wheels | WFL Football | Rynearson Stadium | 1974 | 1974 | Folded | 0 |
| Detroit Loves | WTT Tennis | Cobo Arena | 1974 | 1974 | Moved to Indiana | 0 |
| Detroit Caesars | APSPL | East Detroit, Memorial Field | 1977 | 1979 | Disbanded | 2 |
| Detroit Auto Kings | NASL | East Detroit, Memorial Field | 1980 | 1980 | Disbanded | 0 |
| Detroit Softball City | UPSL | Softball City, Detroit | 1982 | 1982 | Disbanded | 0 |
| Michigan Panthers | USFL/UFL | Ford Field | 2022 | 2025 | Folded | 0 |
| Detroit Mechanix | AUDL | Bishop Foley Catholic High School | 2010 | 2025 | Folded | 0 |

^{*} In 1967, Detroit was selected as one of the cities to adopt a European professional soccer club in a bid to promote the game Stateside. The event was planned to coincide with Europe's off/close season when the teams would have otherwise been dormant for the summer. Detroit was represented by the Northern Irish team Glentoran, playing as the Detroit Cougars. Detroit City FC played in special jerseys as an homage to the cougars in a 2017 International Friendly against Glentoran at Keyworth Stadium on the 50th anniversary of the European club representing the city of Detroit.

The Soul Sisters softball team, an all-female softball team existed in Detroit in 1960s–1980s.

== Venues ==
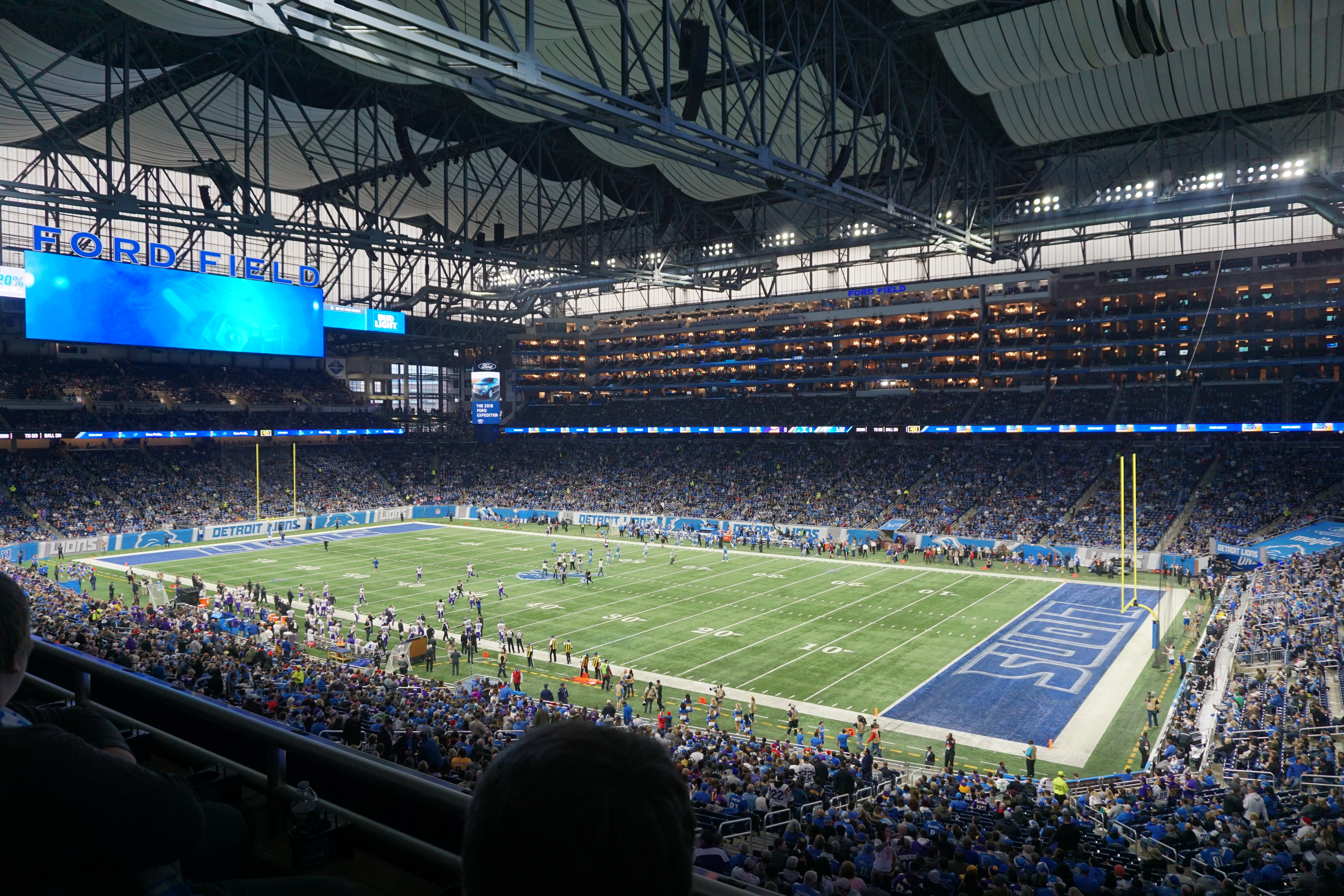
Ford Field

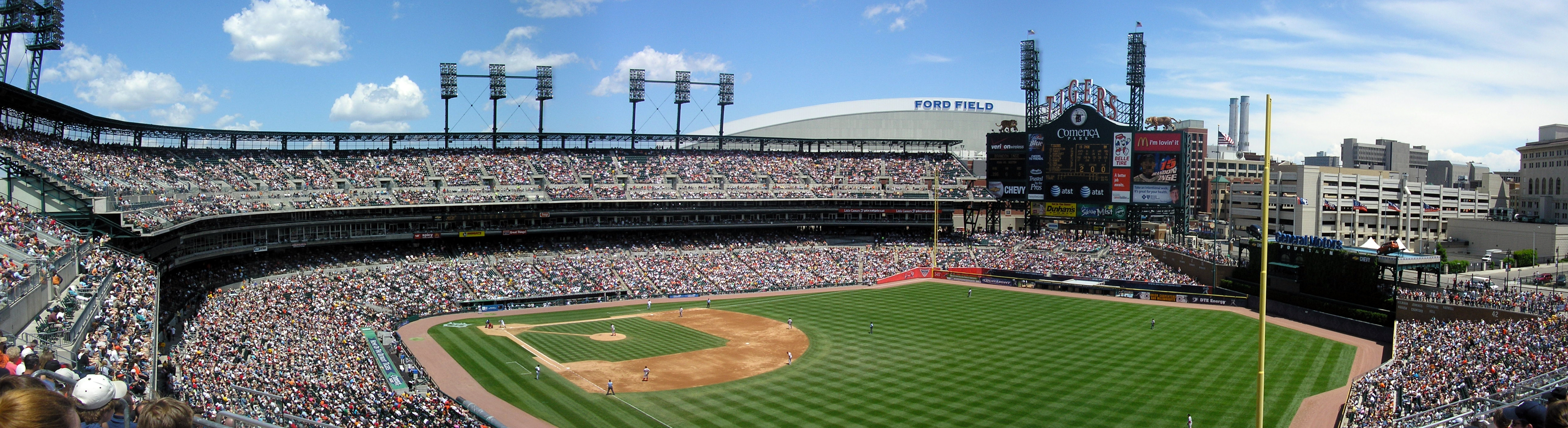
Comerica Park

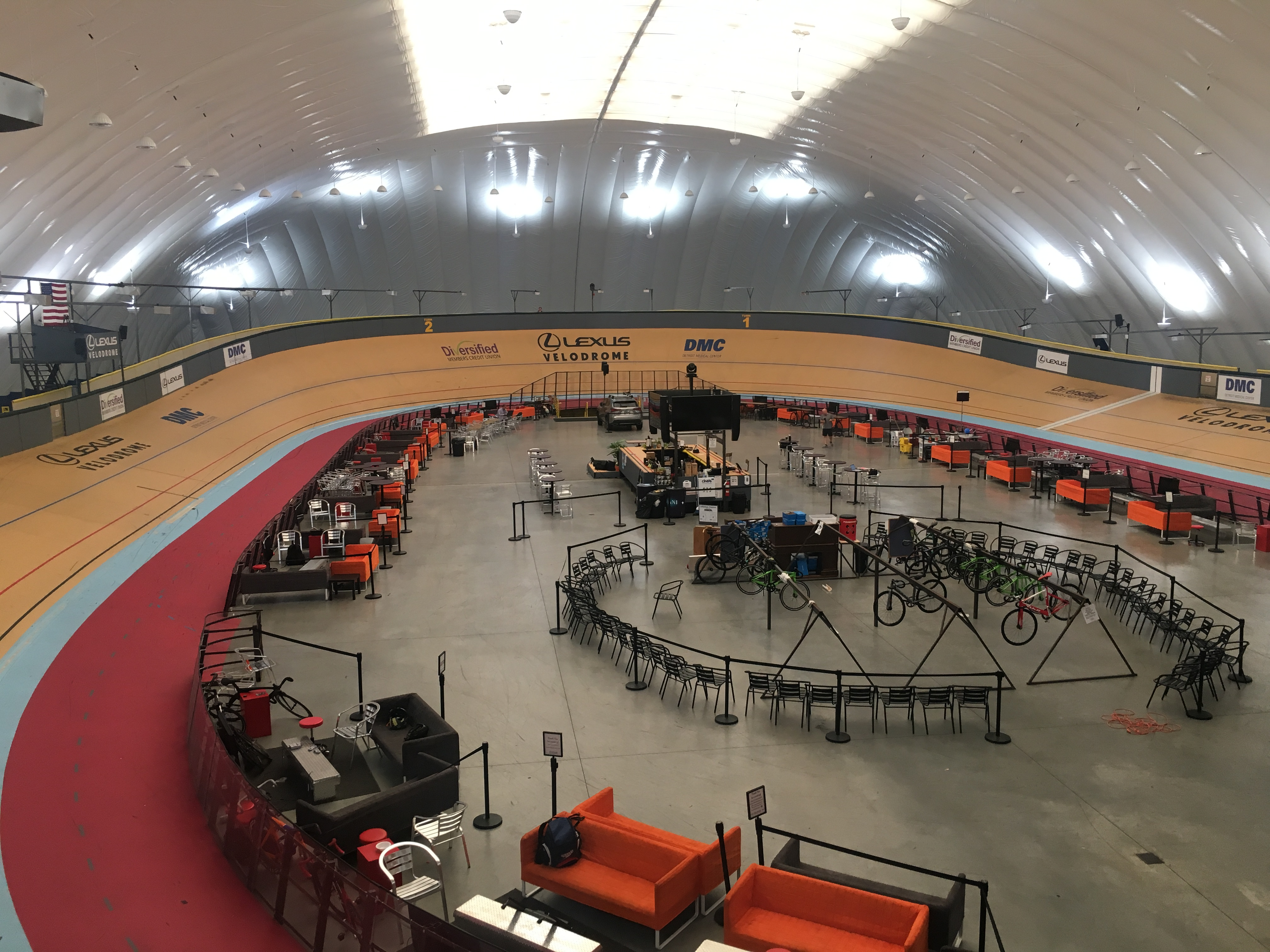
Lexus Velodrome

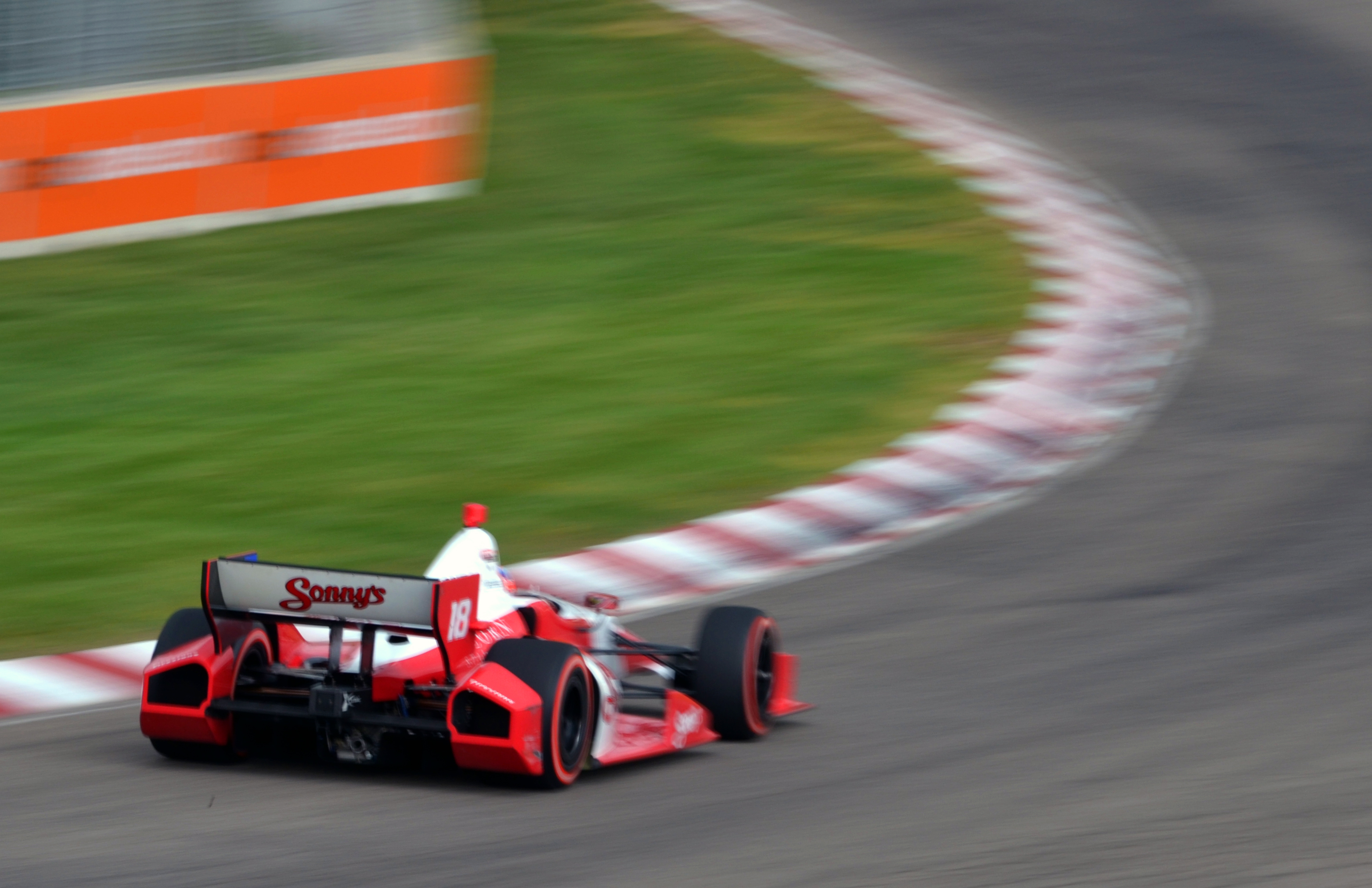
Raceway at Belle Isle

== Media ==
Detroit has one FM radio station broadcasting sports in the metro Detroit area, 97.1 FM WXYT. WJR-AM 760 broadcasts the Michigan State Spartans games and WWJ-AM 950 broadcasts University of Michigan Wolverines games. There are now several sports podcast networks broadcasting daily. The Detroit Sports Podcast Network airs daily sports podcasts and has reporters covering sports all across metro Detroit.

== Professional wrestling ==
Historically, Detroit was home to its own professional wrestling territory, Big Time Wrestling, from the 1950s until the 1980s. In 2007, Detroit hosted World Wrestling Entertainment (WWE)'s WrestleMania 23 which attracted 80,103 fans to Ford Field on April 1, 2007; the event marking the 20th anniversary of WrestleMania III which drew a reported 93,173 to the Pontiac Silverdome in nearby Pontiac in 1987. WWE has also held three of the annual Survivor Series events in Detroit with the 1991, 1999, and 2005 pay-per-views emanating from Joe Louis Arena, Vengeance 2002, and SummerSlam 2023 at Ford Field. Detroit also hosted the returning Saturday Night's Main Event XXXII on March 18, 2006 and numerous episodes of the weekly Monday Night Raw and SmackDown telecasts since 1994 and 1999, respectively.

== Boxing ==
Kronk Gym, based in Detroit, is one of the most celebrated boxing institutions in the world. Named after Detroit City Councilman John A. Kronk and operating since 1921, the gym produced more than 40 world champions and three Olympic gold medalists under head trainer Emanuel Steward. Notable alumni include Thomas Hearns, Lennox Lewis, Wladimir Klitschko, Hilmer Kenty, and Milton McCrory. The gym has informally been called "Detroit's Fifth Franchise" in reference to its cultural standing alongside the city's four major professional sports teams. The original facility at 5555 McGraw Avenue closed in 2006 and was destroyed by fire in 2017. In December 2025, KRONK reopened at the historic Brewster-Wheeler Recreation Center at 670 Wilkins Street.

== See also ==
- Country Club of Detroit
- Cycling in Detroit
- Detroit Athletic Club
- Detroit Boat Club
- Detroit Yacht Club
- Detroit Golf Club
- Detroit Wolverines
- 1887 Detroit Wolverines season
- Bally Sports Detroit
- Grosse Pointe Yacht Club
- Metro Detroit
- Red Bull Air Race World Championship
- U.S. cities with teams from four major sports
- Multiple major sports championship seasons
