= Nicknames of Detroit =

Nicknames for the city in Michigan, United States

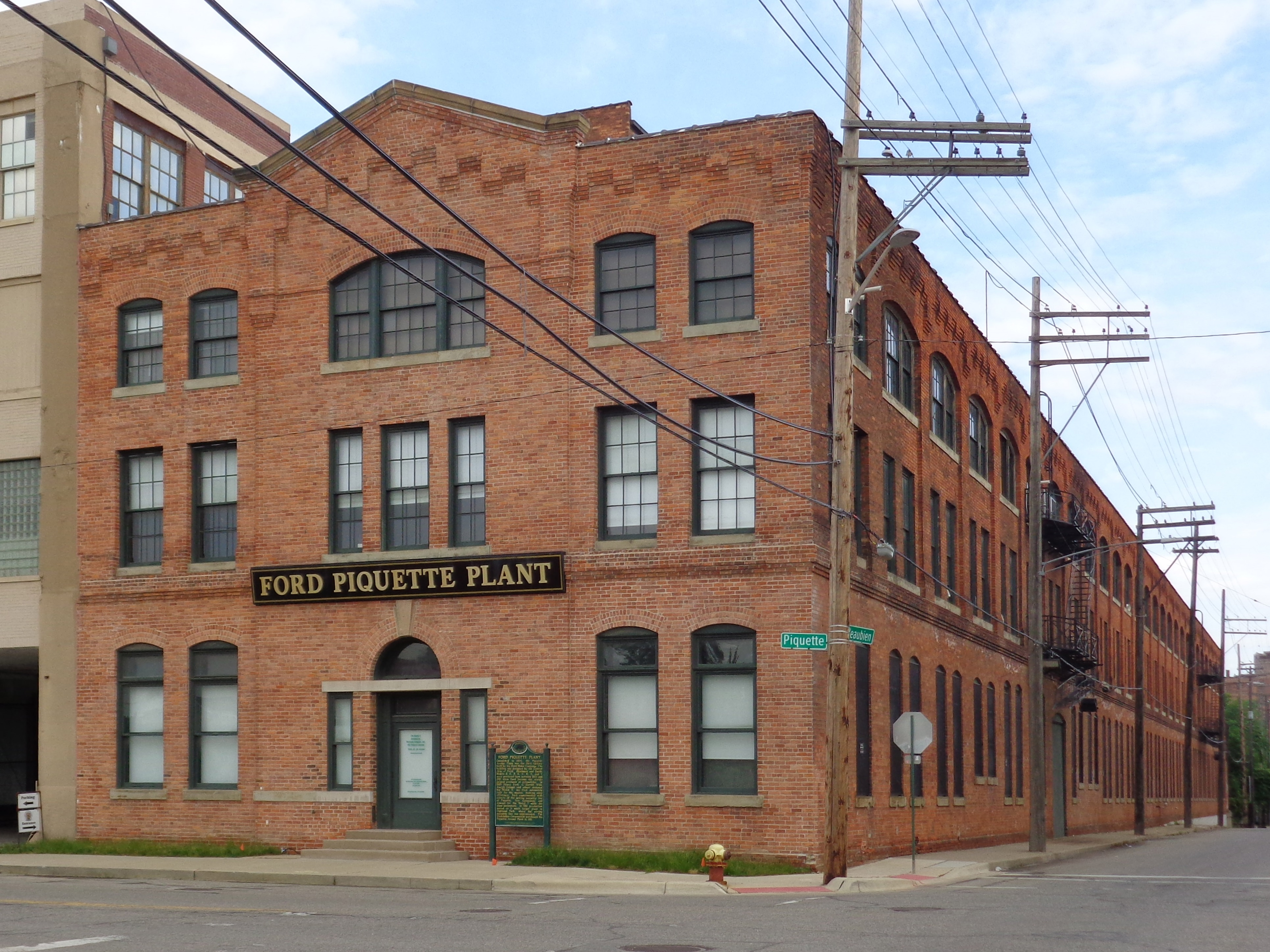
Ford Piquette Avenue Plant

There are many nicknames for the city of Detroit, the largest city in Michigan and 26th-largest city in the United States. The city's nicknames reflect its geography, economy, multicultural population, and popular culture, including sports and music. They are often used by the media and in popular culture to reference the city.

== List ==
Motor City
Detroit’s most popular unofficial nickname, reflecting its longstanding role as the center of the American automotive industry. The city and the surrounding Metro Detroit area serve as headquarters for the Big Three American automakers, Ford, General Motors, and Stellantis North America (historically Chrysler).

Motown
Derived from "Motor Town", this nickname highlights Detroit's contributions to music, specifically the Motown genre and the influence of Motown Records, founded in the city in 1959.

The Town That Put The World on Wheels
A tribute to Detroit's role in pioneering the mass production of automobiles.

The D
Commonly used shorthand for Detroit, especially in modern music and media.

The 313
Named after Detroit's area code, 313, this nickname symbolizes local pride and has been popularized in media such as the film 8 Mile (2002).

D-Town
A casual and widely used nickname that represents Detroit's urban identity.

Renaissance City
A nod to Detroit's efforts in urban revitalization and the Renaissance Center complex.

Hockeytown
The phrase "Hockeytown", combined with the distinctive winged wheel logo of the NHL's Detroit Red Wings, is a registered trademark owned by the franchise. Originally coined in 1999, the name has its origins in a rivalry with Warroad, Minnesota, which also claims the title.

Rock City
A reference to the 1976 song "Detroit Rock City" by Kiss, this nickname highlights the city's association with rock music.

Paris of the Midwest
This nickname dates back to Detroit's French colonial origins, specifically to 1701 when Fort Pontchartrain was established, and the French named the waterway "le détroit du Lac Érié" (the strait of Lake Erie). The city's French heritage, along with architecture and Parisian-style boulevards designed by Augustus Woodward, led to Detroit's being likened to Paris. Known for its broad river, tree-lined streets, and historic architecture, Detroit was then also celebrated as the "Paris of the Midwest" during the 19th and early 20th-centuries.

== See also ==
- List of city nicknames in Michigan
- Nicknames of Chicago
- Nicknames of Cleveland
