= WYC =

WYC may refer to:

- Wawasee Yacht Club
- Wei-Yin Chen
- West Yorkshire Constabulary
- Wherry Yacht Charter Charitable Trust
- Windsor Yacht Club
- Württembergischer Yacht Club
- Wycliffe's Bible
