= List of city nicknames in Ohio =

This partial list of city nicknames in the State of Ohio compiles the aliases, sobriquets and slogans that cities in Ohio are known by (or have been known by historically), officially and unofficially, to municipal governments, local people, outsiders or their tourism boards or chambers of commerce. City nicknames can help in establishing a civic identity, helping outsiders recognize a community or attracting people to a community because of its nickname; promote civic pride; and build community unity. Nicknames and slogans that successfully create a new community "ideology or myth" are also believed to have economic value. Their economic value is difficult to measure, but there are anecdotal reports of cities that have achieved substantial economic benefits by "branding" themselves by adopting new slogans.

== Nicknames by city ==
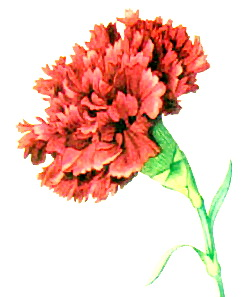
Alliance, which is officially nicknamed the Carnation City, helped make the scarlet carnation the state flower of Ohio.

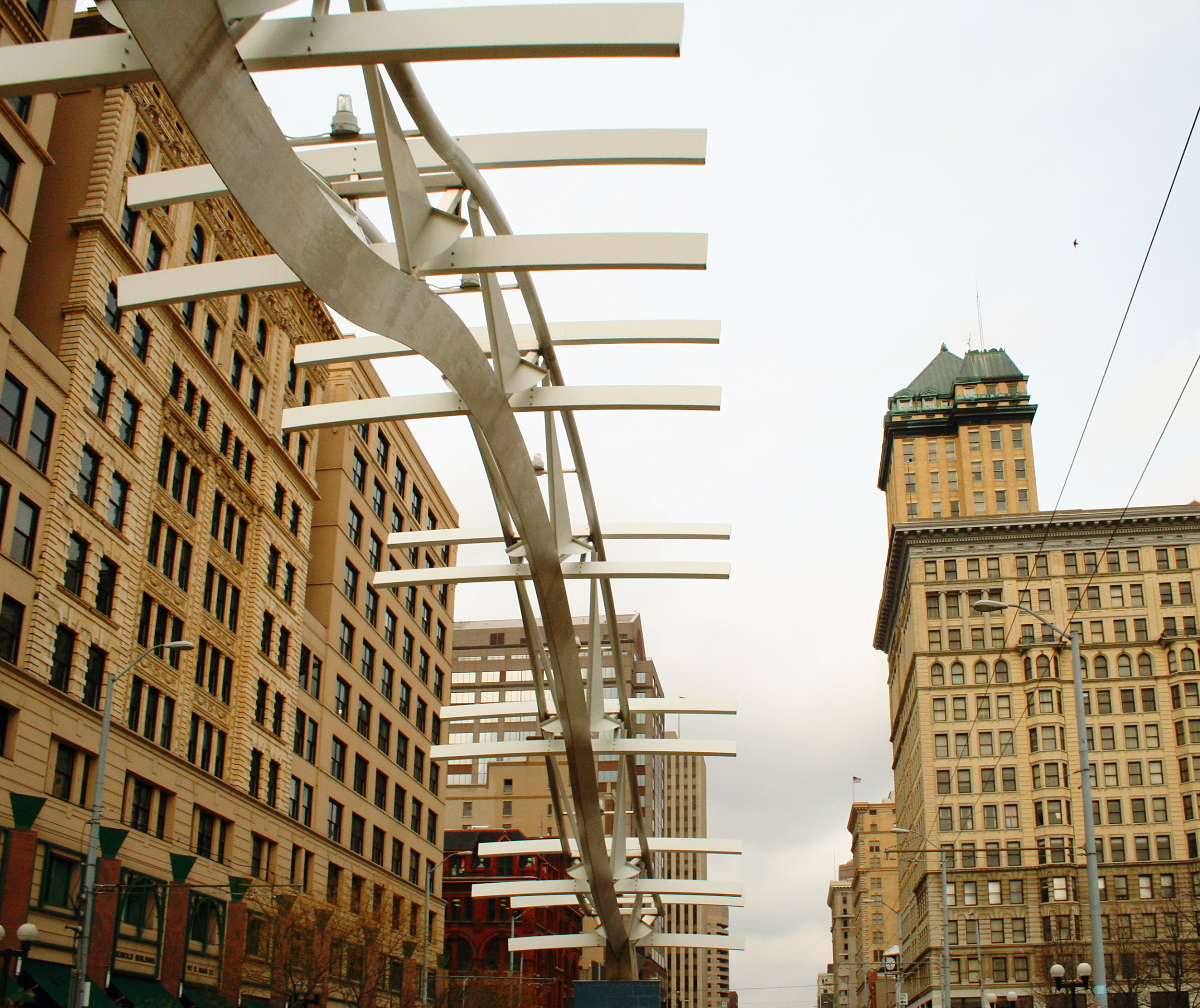
The sculpture Flyover in downtown Dayton, the "Birthplace of Aviation," tracks the path of the Wright Brothers' first powered aircraft flight.

=== A ===
- Akron
  - City of Invention
  - Rubber Capital of the World.
  - Rubber City
  - Summit City
  - Tire City.
  - AK Rowdy
- Alliance – Carnation City.
- Amherst – Sandstone Capital of the World.

=== B ===
- Barberton – Magic City
- Bryan - the Fountain City
- Bowling Green
  - Pull Town
  - Boring Green
  - Blowing Green
- Bucyrus – Bratwurst Capital of the World.

=== C ===
- Canton
  - America's Playing Field
  - Hall of Fame City
- Chillicothe – Ohio's First Capital
  - Paper City
- Cincinnati – see also Cincinnati nicknames
  - The Blue Chip City
  - Cincy (or Cinci)
  - The City of Seven Hills
  - The 'Nati
  - Paris of America
  - Porkopolis
  - The Queen City
  - The Queen of the West
  - The Tri-State
  - CinCity
  - Ohio's Maserati
  - Cincinasty
- Circleville – Roundtown
- Cleveland – see also Cleveland nicknames
  - America's North Coast
  - C-Town
  - City of Champions – Popularized in 2016 after area native Stipe Miocic won the UFC World Heavyweight Championship, the Lake Erie Monsters (now known as the Cleveland Monsters) won the Calder Cup, and the Cleveland Cavaliers won the NBA Championship all within a six-week span in that calendar year.
  - The Best Location in the Nation
  - The Cleve (nickname used in TV show 30 Rock)
  - The Forest City
  - The Heart of New Connecticut
  - The Land
  - Mistake on the Lake
  - Believe-land
  - Rock City
  - Rock n' Roll Capital Of The World
  - The 216 – Referring to the local area code
  - The CLE
- Cleveland Heights
  - C-Heights
- Columbus
  - The Arch City
  - Buckeye City
  - Cowtown
  - The Discovery City
  - C-bus
  - Indie Arts Capital of the World
  - Somaliwood (a reference to the local Somali film industry)
  - The Biggest Small Town In America
  - Test Market, USA
  - Flavor Town - After native Guy Fieri. An attempt was made to rename the city to this in 2020.

=== D ===
- Dayton
  - The Gem City
  - Birthplace of Aviation (commemorates the Wright brothers, who invented the airplane in their bicycle shop in Dayton)
  - Little Detroit
  - Dirty Dayton
  - The DYT
- Delphos – America’s Friendliest City
- Deshler – Corn City
- Dublin – The Emerald City

=== F ===
- Findlay – Flag City
- Fremont – Cutlery Capitol of the World

=== G ===
- Gahanna – Ohio’s Herb Capital
- Gallipolis – City of the Gauls
- Greenville – Treaty City
- Gomer – Gomerica

=== H ===
- Hamilton
  - The City of Sculpture
  - The Safe Capital of the World
- Huber Heights – The Brick City

=== I ===
- Ironton – Gateway To Southern Ohio
  - Iron City

=== K ===
- Kent – The Tree City
- Kenton – Little Chicago

=== L ===
- Lancaster
  - The Glass City
  - Little Vegas
- Lebanon – The Cedar City
- Lima
  - BeanTown (refers to the Lima Bean)
  - Little Detroit (In the 1980's and 1990's)
- Lorain – International City
- Loudonville - The Canoe Capital of Ohio
- Loveland
  - Sweetheart of Ohio
  - Little Switzerland of the Miami Valley

=== M ===
- Mansfield
  - The Fun Center of Ohio
  - Little Detroit
- Marion – World's Popcorn Capital.
- Massillon
  - City of Champions
  - Title Town, USA
  - Tiger Town
- Miamisburg – The Star City.

=== N ===
- Norwalk – The Maple City
- Norwood – Gem of the Highlands

=== O ===
- Oberlin – The Town that Started the Civil War
- Oregon
  - Oregon on the Bay
  - Boregon

=== P ===
- Pickerington – Violet Capital of Ohio.
- Port Clinton – Walleye Capital of the World.

=== R ===
- Reynoldsburg – Birthplace of the Tomato

=== S ===
- Sabina – The Eden of Ohio
- Sandusky – The Roller Coaster Capital of the World
- Springfield
  - Little Chicago (refers to crime and poverty level)
  - Champion City (refers to the Champion reaper that was once produced in the city)
  - City at the End of the Road
  - Home City
  - Rose City or City of Roses
- Steubenville- The City of Murals
- Strongsville – Crossroads of the Nation
- Sugarcreek – The Little Switzerland of Ohio

=== T ===
- Toledo
  - Frog Town
  - Glass Capital of the World
  - The Glass City
  - The Solar Valley
  - The Mud
  - The 419
  - Holy Toledo
  - T-Town
  - T-Town Believe Town
  - Not the Rose City

=== U ===
- University Heights – City of Beautiful Homes

=== V ===
- Valley City – Frog Jump Capital of Ohio.

=== W ===
- Wapakoneta – Moon City
- Waynesville – Antique capital of the Midwest.
- Willard – City of Blossoms
- Wilmington
  - Dubtown
  - Wilmy

=== X ===
- Xenia – Twine City

=== Y ===
- Youngstown
  - The City of You
  - Crimetown, USA
  - Murdertown, USA
  - The Steel Valley
  - Steeltown, U.S.A.
  - The Three Three Yo (Combination of the city’s area code, 330, with the first two letters of its name)
  - Poster Child for Deindustrialization
  - Yompton (In reference to Compton, California)
  - Y-Town

=== Z ===
- Zanesville
  - City of Natural Advantages
  - Clay City or Pottery Capital of the World
  - Y-Bridge City

== See also ==
- List of city nicknames in the United States
- List of cities in Ohio
