= Paul Noce =

American baseball player (born 1959)

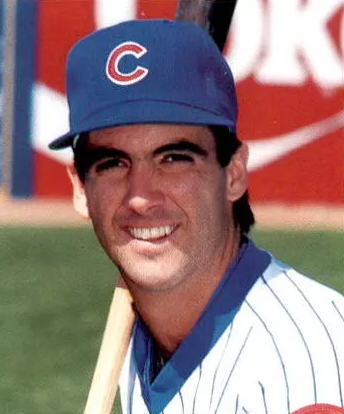
- Noce c. 1987
- Infielder
- Born: December 16, 1959 (age 65); San Francisco, California, U.S.
- Batted: Right Threw: Right

MLB debut
- June 1, 1987, for the Chicago Cubs

Last MLB appearance
- May 17, 1990, for the Cincinnati Reds

MLB statistics
- Batting average: .232
- Home runs: 3
- Runs batted in: 14
- Stats at Baseball Reference

Teams
- As player: Chicago Cubs (1987); Cincinnati Reds (1990); As coach: Pittsburgh Pirates (1992–1993); Taepyungyang Dolphins (1993)

Paul David Noce (born December 16, 1959) is an American former professional baseball player who played for the Chicago Cubs and the Cincinnati Reds of the Major League Baseball (MLB). He debuted on June 1, 1987, against the Houston Astros. He played in 70 games that year at second base, shortstop, and third base. He didn't appear in the majors again until 1990 with the Cincinnati Reds. He had only one at bat that season, in which he singled.

== Career ==
Noce attended Sequoia High School in Redwood City, California before enrolling at Washington State University, where he played college baseball for the Cougars from 1979 to 1981.

=== Coaching career ===
Noce served as a coach for the Pittsburgh Pirates in 1992 and 1993. He also coached for the Taepyungyang Dolphins of the KBO in 1993. He also served as the head baseball coach at Hillsdale College in Michigan from 1994 to 2013, stepping down after his 20th season. He notched his 300th win as coach in 2010.

In 2016 and 2017, he was the manager for the Eastside Diamond Hoppers of the United Shore Professional Baseball League.
