= Toledo Yacht Club =

- Burgee
- Short name: TYC
- Founded: 1865
- Location: Bay View Park, Toledo, Ohio, U.S.
- Website: www.toledoyachtclub.com

The Toledo Yacht Club is a private yacht club in Bay View Park, in Toledo, Ohio, located on the Maumee River, at the western end of Lake Erie.

== History ==
The Toledo Yacht Club is among the oldest yacht clubs in North America. The Toledo Yacht Club was founded in 1865 with the name of Toledo Boat Club when two rowing clubs, the Undines and the Naiads, joined and turned their attention to sailing.

The Toledo Yacht Club was incorporated on October 3, 1885. In 1904, the club readopted the name Toledo Yacht Club.

== Clubhouse ==
- Toledo Yacht Club
- U.S. National Register of Historic Places
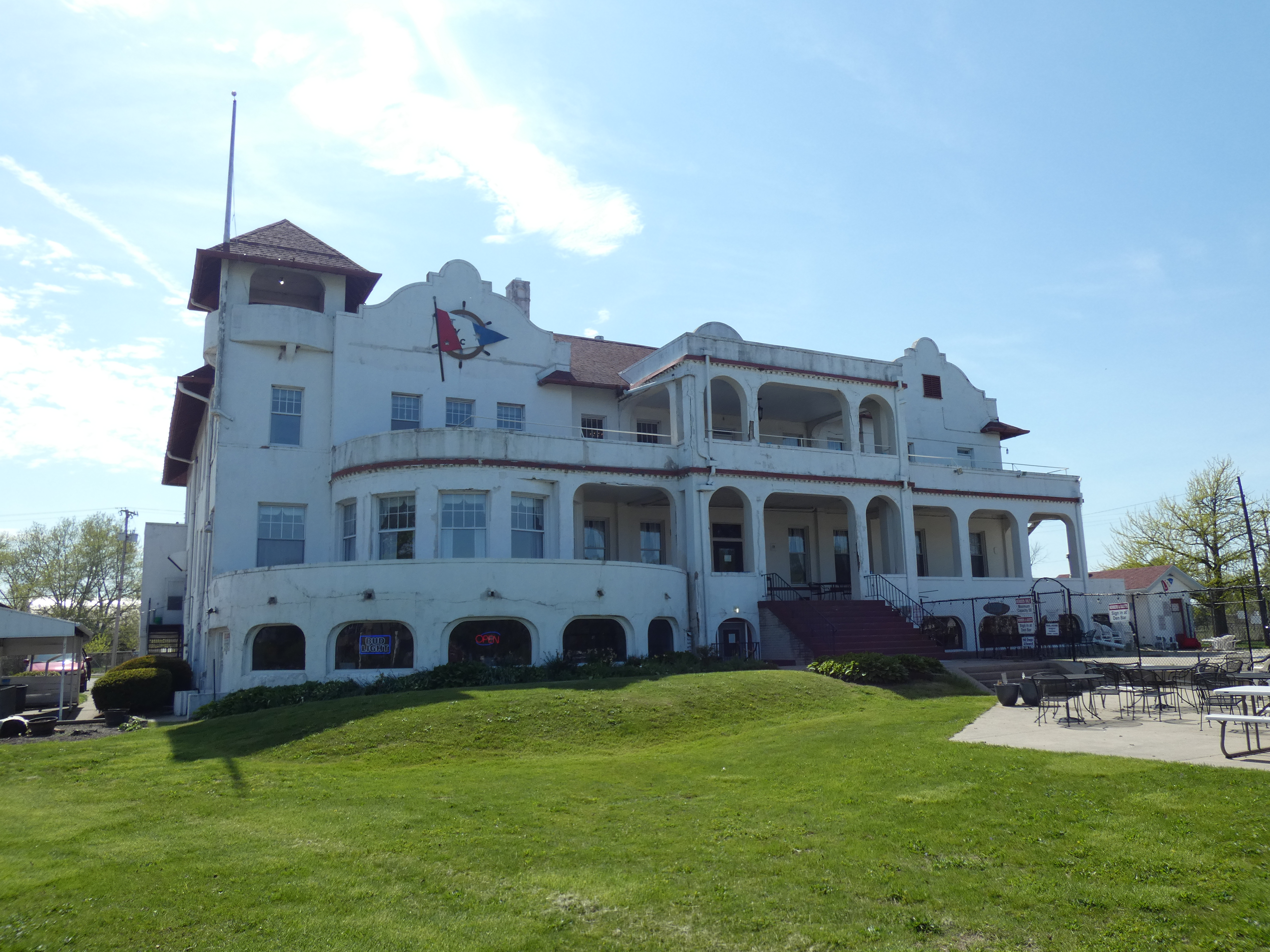

- Location within Ohio Location within the United States
- Location: Bay View Park, Toledo, Ohio
- Coordinates: 41°41′35″N 83°28′32″W
- Area: 1 acre (0.40 ha)
- Built: 1908
- Architect: Sturges, A. Burnside
- Architectural style: Mission/Spanish Revival, Mission Revival eclectic
- NRHP reference No.: 76001476
- Added to NRHP: December 12, 1976

The first club house was erected in 1878 on Gard Island near the mouth of the Ottawa River.

In 1890, a more elaborate structure with sleeping rooms and a second floor was built.

In 1896, a rival club, the Ohio Yacht Club, unsuccessfully attempted to take over the Toledo Yacht Club's Gard Island lease. Later that year, the two clubs merged under the name Toledo Yachting Association, maintaining city quarters in the Neptune Building in Toledo, Ohio.

When Bay View Park was developed, a 25-year lease was granted to the Toledo Yachting Association, and a wood frame club house was erected at the present site of the club in 1903.

In 1906, a fire completely destroyed the club and all of its historic contents. By 1908, a new steel reinforced concrete Spanish style clubhouse was built on the site. This historic building still remains basically the same and was listed on the National Register of Historic Places on December 12, 1976.

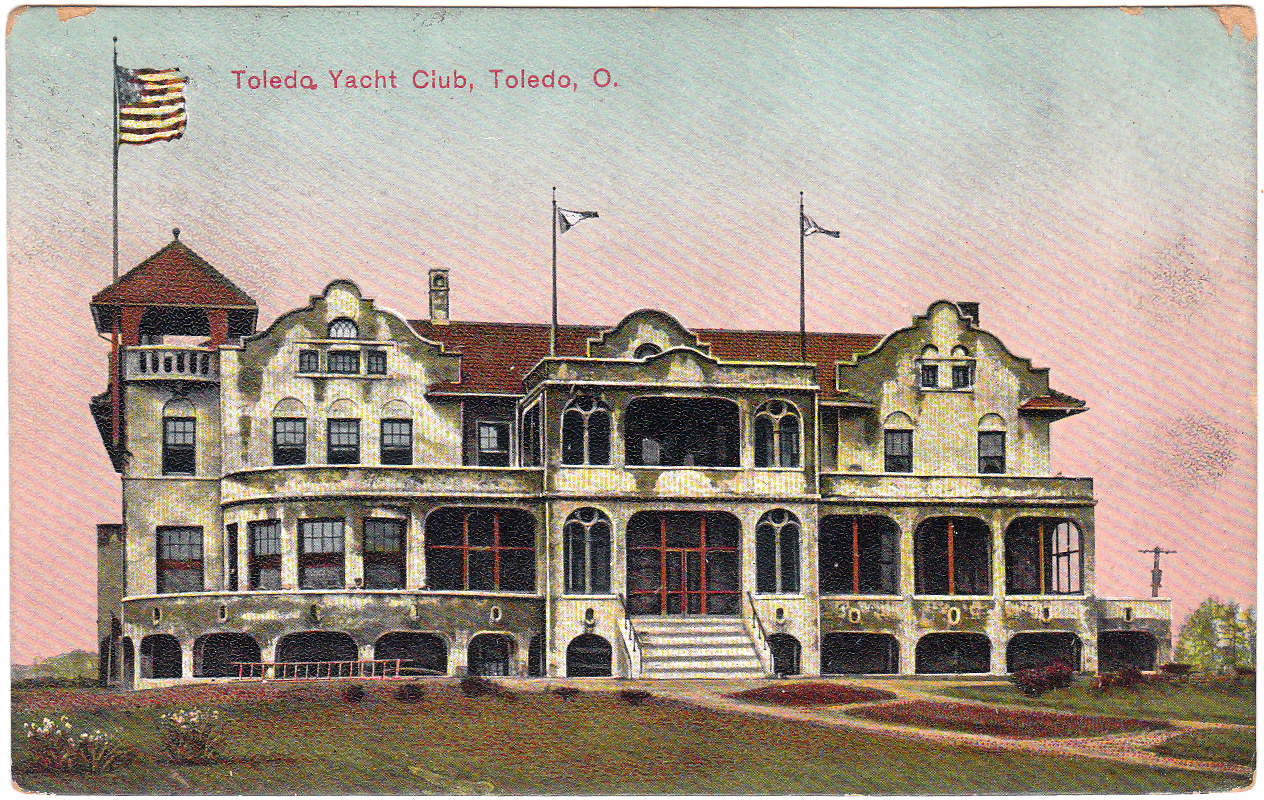
1920 Postcard of Toledo Yacht Club in Toledo, Ohio

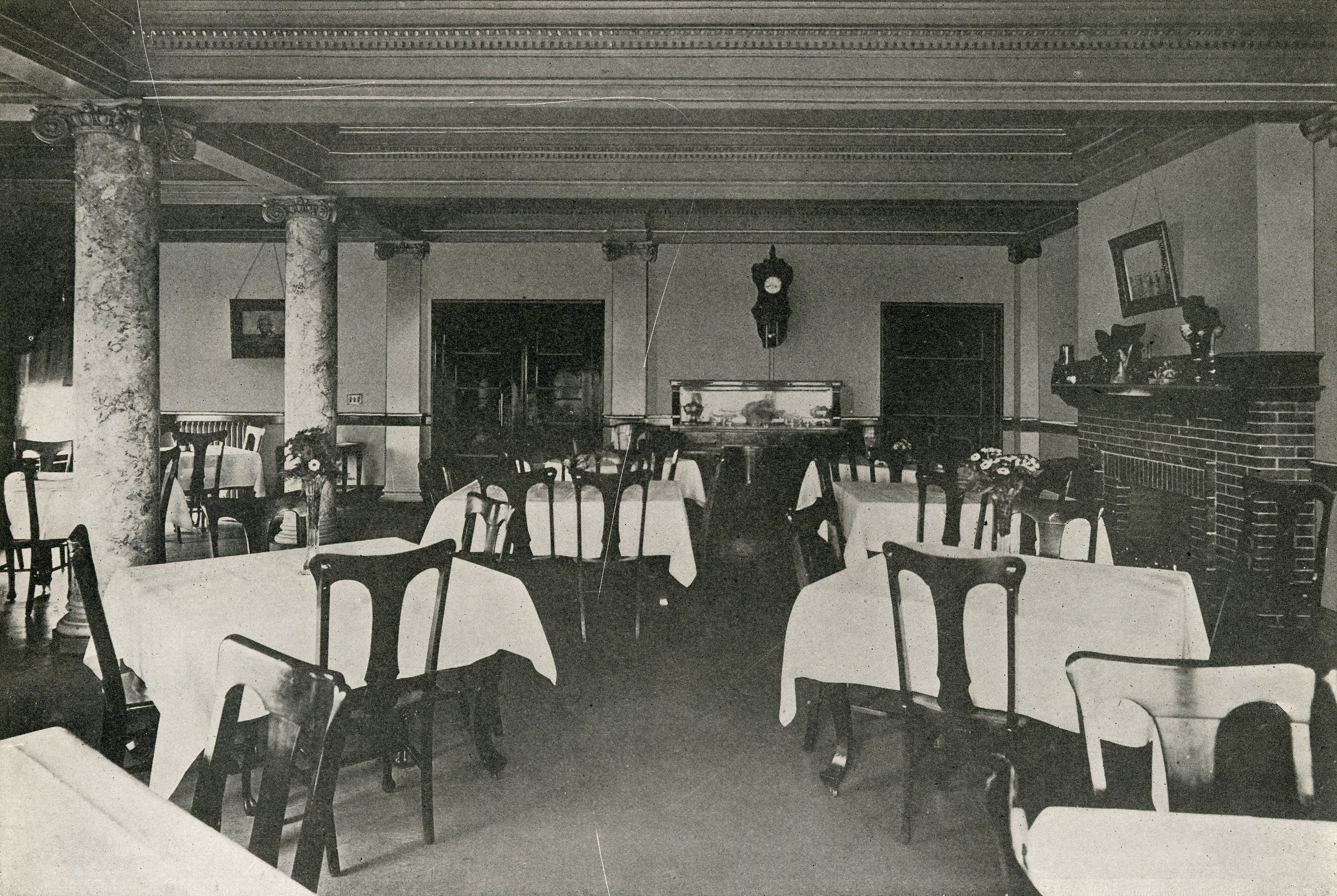
Toledo Yacht Club dining room, 1912

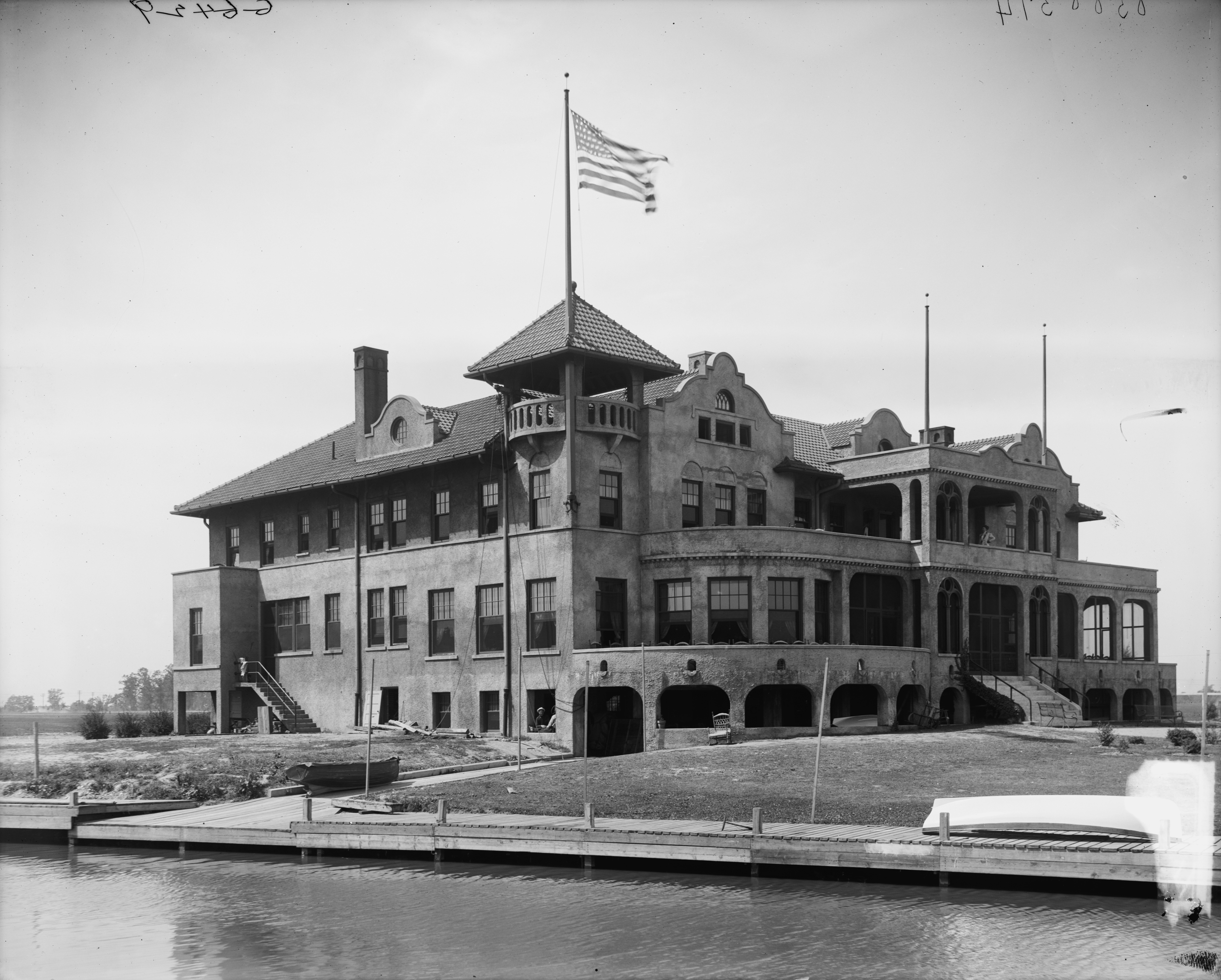
1900s photo of Toledo Yacht Club

== Organization ==
The Toledo Yacht Club is a member owned corporation. It consists of a membership body, a Board of Trustees, and a Bridge of Officers who are elected individually. The Bridge Officers also serve as Trustees on the Board.

=== Officers ===
The Toledo Yacht Club is led by its chief executive, the Commodore. Next are the Vice Commodore and Rear Commodore. The club has a Financial Secretary, Treasurer, and Recording Secretary. These officers are collectively known as the Bridge. The previous year's Commodore serves as the Fleet Commander and Trustee, and there are five additional Trustees on the Board.

Additional titles of Fleet Surgeon and Historian are assigned by the Commodore, however, they are not members of the board of trustees.

The title Past Commodore is given to members who have served in the office of Commodore. Past Commodores are eligible for membership in the International Order of the Blue Gavel.

A. L. Smith was named the first Commodore in 1865. A full succession list of Toledo Yacht Club Commodores and their respective years of service will be added at a later date.

=== Membership ===
Membership in the Toledo Yacht Club is divided into several classes, defined by the club Constitution and By-Laws. (details to follow)

== Events ==
Some of the events hosted by the Toledo Yacht Club include:

- Back To The Bay
- Mills Trophy Race
- Commodore's Ball
- Various Cruises

== Affiliations ==
The Toledo Yacht Club is affiliated with the following organizations:

=== Yachting and Boating ===
- Associated Yacht Clubs, (AYC)
- Detroit Regional Yacht-racing Association [formerly the Detroit River Yachting Association] (DRYA)
- Inter-Lake Yachting Association (I-LYA)
- International Order of the Blue Gavel, District 9, Toledo Chapter
- United States Power Squadrons, District 29, Toledo Power Squadron, USPS, Sail and Power Boating
- US Sailing
- Western Lake Erie Cruiser Association

=== Business ===
- Boat/US
- Point Place Business Association

== Hauntings ==
The Toledo Yacht Club was featured as a haunted case on the paranormal series Ghost Hunters on the August 24, 2016 season 11 episode "Children in the Attic". TAPS investigated with their client, and clubs & events manager Susan Hurst and her 11-year-old son, Hunter Spioch who made contact with "Jacob", a 10-year-old boy spirit who he claims told him he fell off the ballroom balcony because he was leaning on the railing. He fell off, landing on the hardwood floor, cracked his head and died in 1910. It is said that Jacob is seen on the balcony along with and his parents haunting the place.
