= Nicknames of Cleveland =

Slang terms for the city in Ohio, U.S.

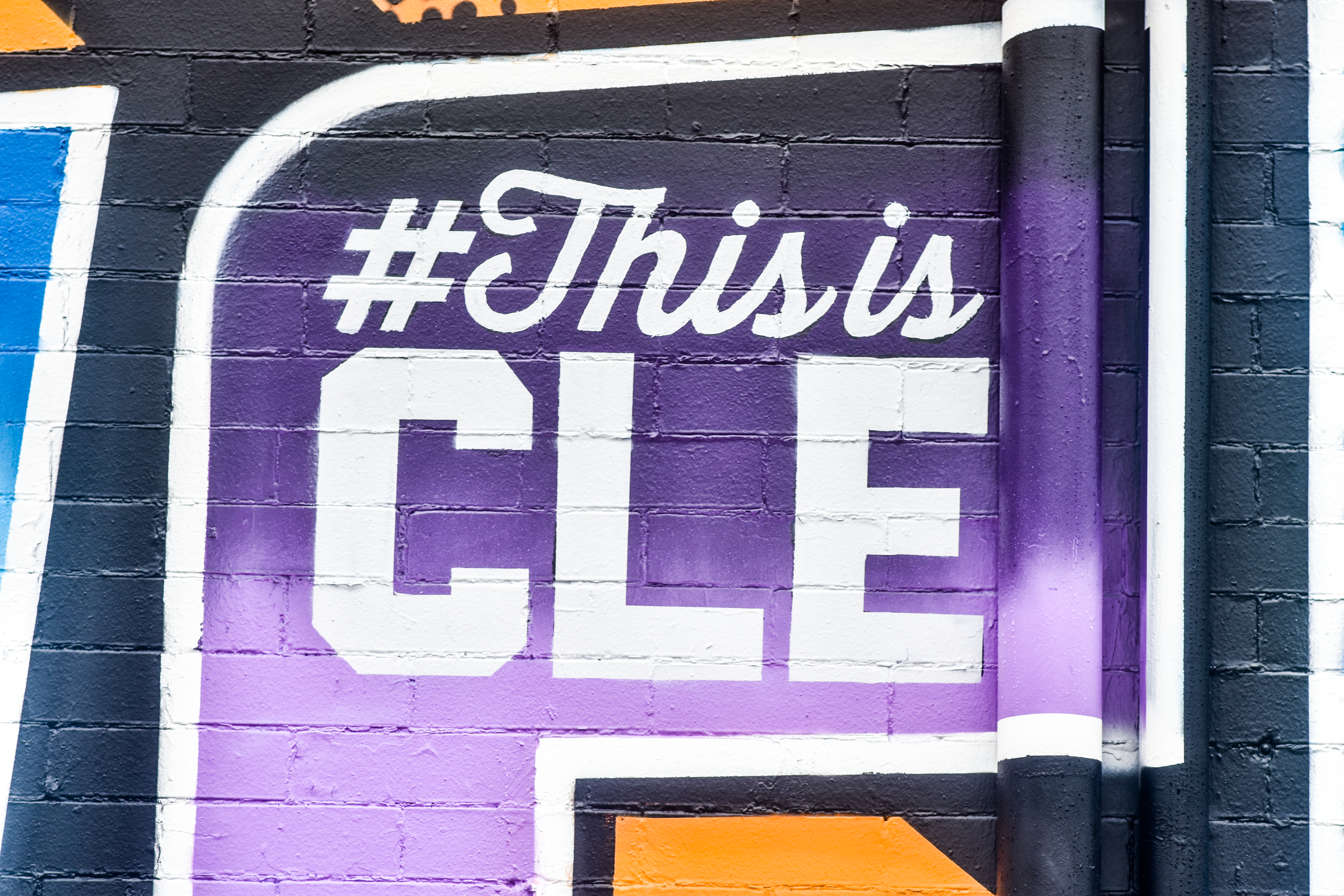
The city's nickname "CLE" is derived from the IATA code for Cleveland Hopkins International Airport.

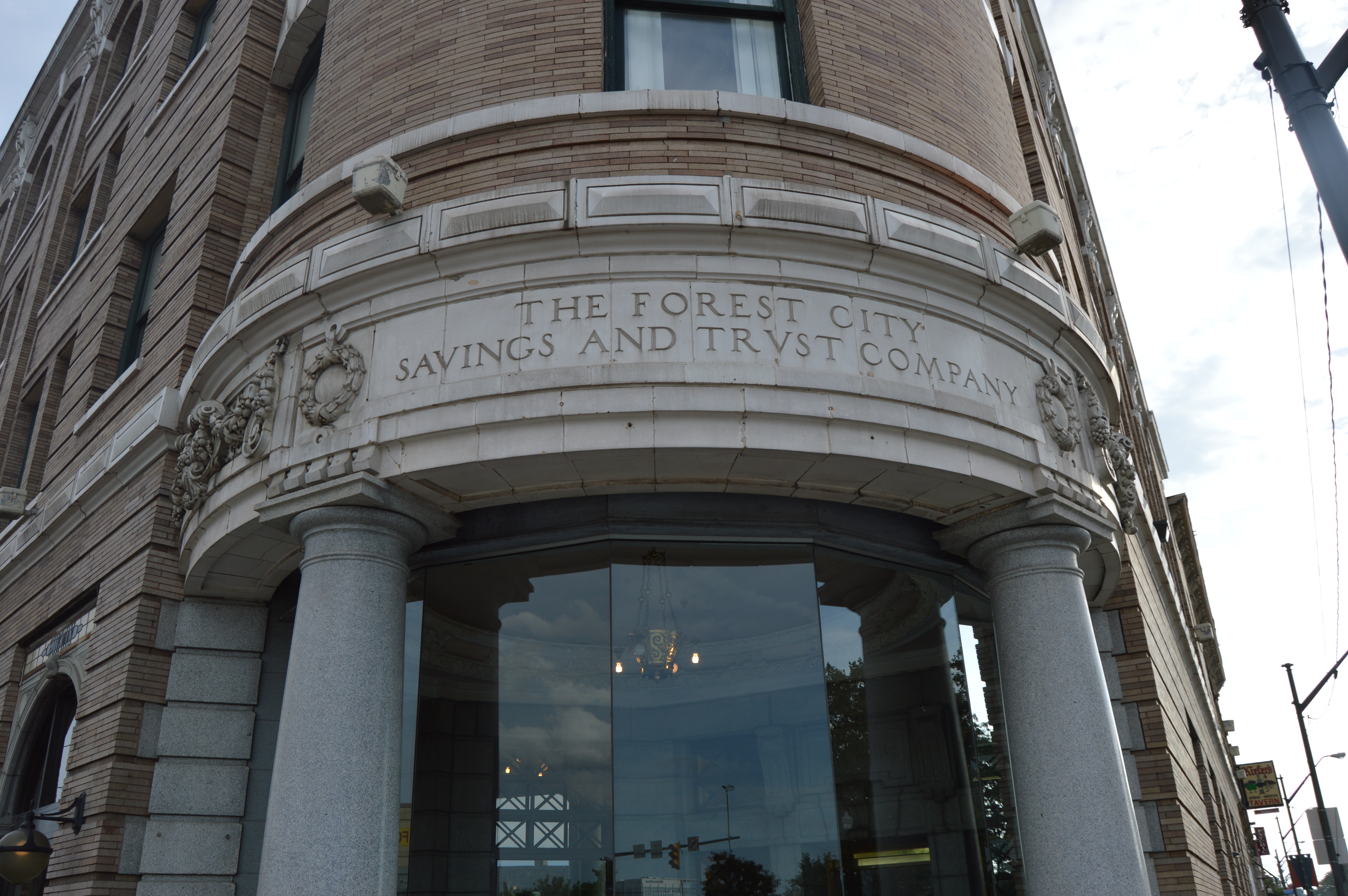
"The Forest City" is Cleveland's oldest nickname, as used here for the Forest City Bank Building in the Ohio City neighborhood.

There have been several nicknames for the City of Cleveland throughout its history. These include:

- "The 216" – Referring to the local area code.
- "America's North Coast" or "The North Coast" – Referring to the city's geographic position on the Lake Erie shore.
- "Believeland" – Originated in 2007 and culminated in the 2016 NBA Finals between the Cleveland Cavaliers and the Golden State Warriors.
- "The Best Location in the Nation" – Nickname commonly used for Cleveland during the 1950s, also referring to the city's geographic position.
- "C-town" or "C-land" – Used by many performing artists and locals to denote Cleveland.
- "City of Champions" – Referring to Cleveland's golden age of sports victories in the 1940s and 1950s.
- "City of Light"
- "The CLE" or simply "CLE" – From the IATA code for Cleveland Hopkins International Airport.
- "The Cleve" – Nickname used on the TV show 30 Rock.
- "The Forest City" – Cleveland's oldest nickname. Introduced in the early 19th century, it refers to the forested nature of the city.
- "The Land" – A term originating in Cleveland-made hip-hop music in the 1990s, and became popular in the national media in the mid-2010s.
- "Metropolis of the Western Reserve" – A historical nickname for Cleveland, referring to the historical Connecticut Western Reserve.
- "The Mistake on the Lake" or "The Mistake by the Lake" – A pejorative term for the city, originating from the late 1960s.
- "The New American City"
- "Prodigy of the Western Reserve" – A nickname for Cleveland coined by local journalist George E. Condon, also referring to the Connecticut Western Reserve.
- "The Rock and Roll Capital of the World" – Originated in the early 1970s. Refers to Cleveland's association with rock and roll music. Today, Cleveland is home of the Rock and Roll Hall of Fame.
- "Sixth City" – An early 20th century nickname due to Cleveland being the sixth largest city in the nation at the time.

== See also ==
- List of city nicknames in Ohio
- Nicknames of Pittsburgh
- Nicknames of Detroit
