= L boat =

The L Boat is a type of sail sloop racing boat designed by the Luedtke Brothers in Toledo, Ohio in May, 1931. The boats were of wood construction with low freeboard. Most of the hulls were mahogany, but a few were redwood and cedar. They were 28 feet (8.5 m) long, 7^{1}/_{2} foot beam, and 3^{1}/_{2} foot draft. They also had an iron centerboard that could be lowered to increase the draft to six feet and assist in upwind sailing. They had a very large mainsail with relatively small headsails and a 3/4s rig. The 40-foot (12 m) tall mast was sitka spruce with stainless rigging.

The first 40 were built by Luedtke; Remi DeBlaere built the last 11. The last hulls were #50 and #51. They were raced One-Design in Detroit from the 1930s thru the 1960s until the class fell apart in 1968 due to the rise of fiberglass in ship construction. The Sally K (Hull #30) is the last remaining L Boat in Detroit. Her hull is redwood. She is docked at the Windmill Pointe Park marina where the Detroit River meets Lake St. Clair.

The L Boats mostly raced out of The Bayview Yacht Club and the Detroit Yacht Club in the Detroit area, but also raced in Lake Erie.

== See also ==
- For another Detroit designed and built sloop, see Crescent Sailboat
