= Nicknames of Chicago =

Slang terms for the city in Illinois, U.S.

Throughout the history of Chicago, there have been many nicknames for the city of Chicago, Illinois.

== Windy City ==
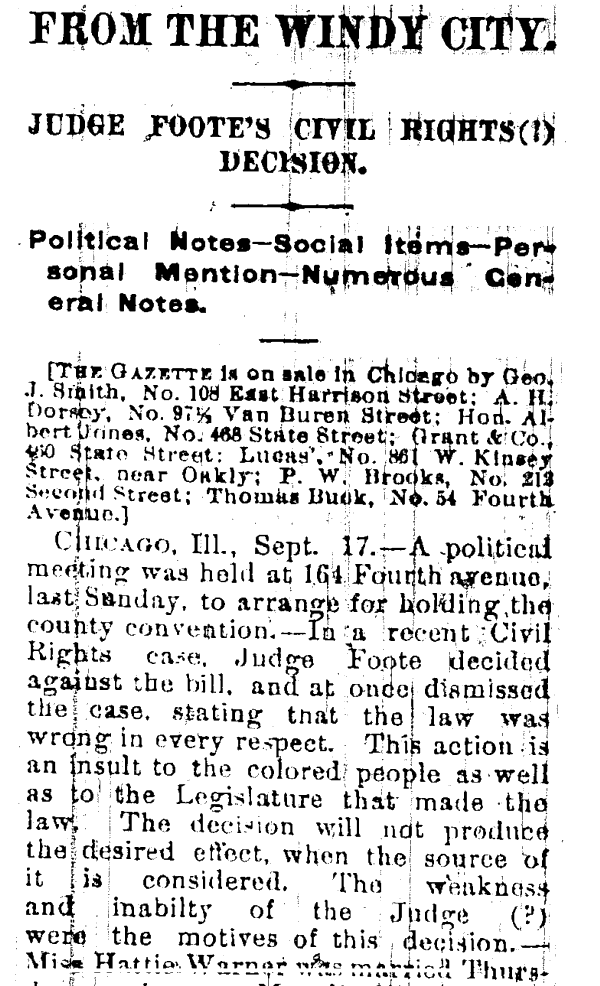
This newspaper article was published by the Cleveland Gazette in 1885.

The city of Chicago has been known by many nicknames, but it is most widely recognized as the "Windy City".

Earlier known references to the "Windy City" were to Green Bay in 1856 and Buffalo, New York in the 1840s and 1850s. The first known repeated effort to label Chicago with this nickname is from 1876 and involves Chicago's rivalry with Cincinnati. The popularity of the nickname endures to this day, more than a century after the Cincinnati rivalry ended.

== Second City ==
"Second City" originates as an insult from a series of articles in The New Yorker by A. J. Liebling, later combined into a book titled Chicago: The Second City (1952). In it, Liebling writes about his hatred for Chicago and contrasts it to his hometown New York City. He complains about Chicago's economic decline, rampant organized crime and political corruption, declining population, outdated schools of thought, and general dependency on the cities along the East Coast. The Chicago-based improv comedy group The Second City references Liebling's book in their self-mocking name. In 2011, Chicago announced its adoption of the slogan "Second to None", a protest stance indirectly referring to Liebling's publications. The slogan was replaced with another in 2022.

An etymology popularized by tour guides suggests that it refers to rebuilding the city following the Great Chicago Fire in 1871.

== Chi-town ==
"Chi-town", "Chi-Town", or "Chitown" (/ˈʃaɪtaʊn/ SHY-town) is a nickname that follows an established pattern of shortening a city's name and appending the suffix "-town", like "H-Town" refers to Houston. Despite many mentions by well-known figures in popular works, such as C. W. McCall's song "Convoy", its popularity as a nickname used by locals is disputed. Wendy McClure wrote in the Chicago Reader in 2017 that it is the "cilantro of nicknames": its distastefulness depends on who is using it. Events and organizations often use the nickname, for example, the hockey team Chi-Town Shooters, the WCW event Chi-Town Rumble, and the New Year's Eve event Chi-Town Rising.

== City of Big Shoulders ==
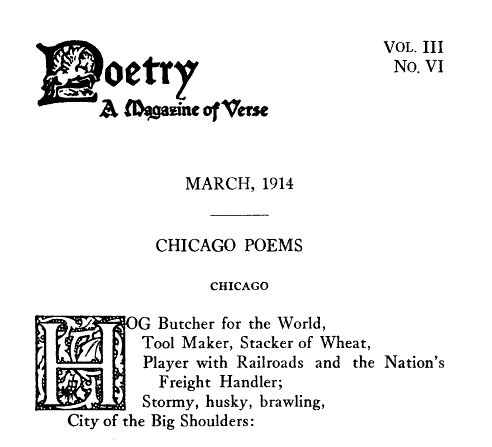

"City of Big Shoulders" is a nickname coined by Carl Sandburg in his 1914 poem "Chicago," which describes the city as "stormy, husky, [and] brawling." It is the last of several nicknames in the poem; the others hint at the city's major industrial activities, for example, the meat-packing industry and railroad industry. It is also sometimes said as the "City of Broad Shoulders."

== Chiberia ==
"Chiberia" – a portmanteau of "Chicago" and "Siberia" – was coined by Richard Castro, a meteorologist working for the National Weather Service, during a cold wave in 2014 that brought the coldest temperatures to the city in multiple decades. The National Weather Service used the hashtag "#Chiberia" during its reporting on the cold wave. The nickname continues to be used during cold weather events, for example in 2017 and in 2019.

== Chiraq ==
"Chiraq" – a portmanteau of "Chicago" and "Iraq" – controversially compares the city (given its crime rates) to war-torn Iraq. Chuck Goudie, a reporter for ABC7 Chicago, asserted that the nickname is based on an Iraq War statistic: from 2003 to 2012, 4,265 people were killed in Chicago, nearly equal to the number of U.S. soldiers killed in Iraq in the same period. The origin of the nickname is not definitive, but it saw increasing popularity in usage around the end of the Iraq War. Spike Lee used the nickname as the title of his 2015 film.

== City in a Garden ==
In the 1830s, the government of Chicago adopted the motto "Urbs in Horto," a Latin term that translates to 'City in a Garden.' It is displayed in the city's seal. The Chicago Park District adopted a seal in 1934 that contains the Latin phrase Hortus in Urbe, meaning 'Garden in a City.'

== Great Commercial Tree ==
"Great Commercial Tree" comes from the lyrics of the state anthem of Illinois: "... Till upon the inland sea, stands thy great commercial tree..."

== Other nicknames ==
- "Mud City" – possibly the oldest nickname for the city, referring to the fact that the terrain of the city used to be a mud flat
- "City by the Lake" – used as early as the 1890s
- "The City that Works" – slogan from Richard J. Daley's tenure as mayor, describing Chicago as a blue-collar, hard-working city, which ran relatively smoothly
- "The Great American City" – taken from Pulitzer Prize-winning novelist Norman Mailer's book Miami and the Siege of Chicago (1968): "Chicago is the great American city ... perhaps [the last] of the great American cities"; "the notion that Chicago is arguably the most quintessential American city" was central to Robert J. Sampson's landmark research on communities, criminology, and urban sociology, Great American City: Chicago and the Enduring Neighborhood Effect (2012)
- "The City Beautiful" – a reference to the eponymous reform movement sparked by the World's Columbian Exposition of 1893, used by Hawk Harrelson when the Chicago White Sox open a game at U.S. Cellular Field
- "The 312" – a reference to the city's original area code under the North American Numbering Plan before the overlays of area code 773, area code 872, and now even later area codes 708 and 464.
- "Paris on the Prairie" - a name from Daniel Burnham's "Plan for Chicago".

== See also ==
- List of city nicknames in Illinois
- List of songs about Chicago
- Nicknames of Detroit
- Nicknames of New York City
