= List of city nicknames in Michigan =

This partial list of city nicknames in Michigan compiles the aliases, sobriquets and slogans that cities in Michigan are known by (or have been known by historically), officially and unofficially, to municipal governments, local people, outsiders or their tourism boards or chambers of commerce. City nicknames can help in establishing a civic identity, helping outsiders recognize a community or attracting people to a community because of its nickname; promote civic pride; and build community unity. Nicknames and slogans that successfully create a new community "ideology or myth" are also believed to have economic value. Their economic value is difficult to measure, but there are anecdotal reports of cities that have achieved substantial economic benefits by "branding" themselves by adopting new slogans.

Some unofficial nicknames are positive, while others are derisive. The unofficial nicknames listed here have been in use for a long time or have gained wide currency.

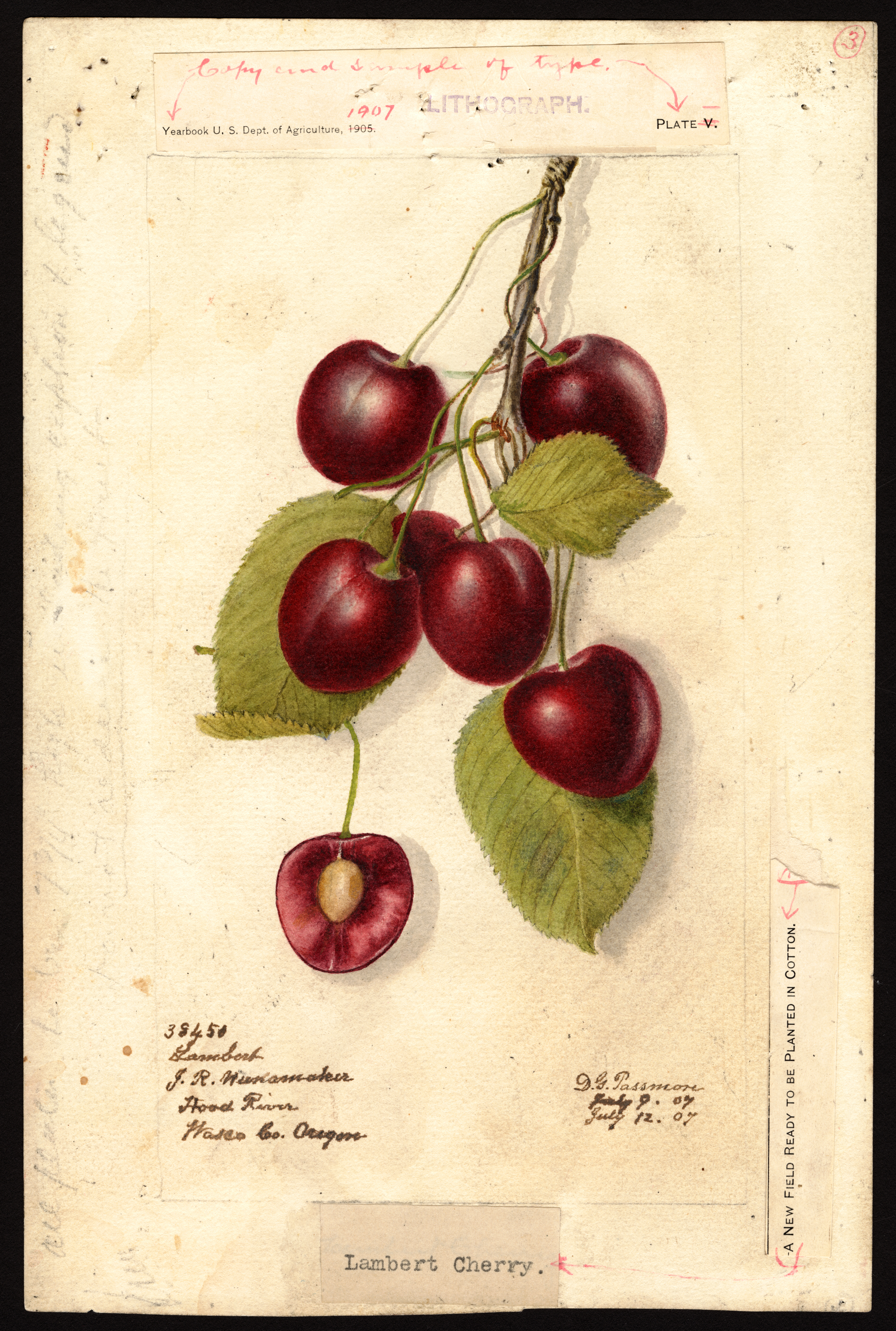
Nicknames for Eau Claire and Traverse City are a reminder that cherries are an important crop in Michigan.

- Adrian – The Maple City
- Alma – Scotland, USA
- Ann Arbor
  - A^{2} or A-squared
  - Tree Town
- Atlanta – Elk Capital of Michigan
- Battle Creek
  - Breakfast Capital of the World
  - Cereal Bowl of the World
  - Cereal City
- Beaver Island – America's Emerald Isle
- Belding
  - Apple Capital
  - Silk City
- Berrien Springs – Christmas Pickle Capital of the World
- Burton - Burtucky
- Cadillac – Chestnut Town USA
- Calumet – Coppertown USA
- Champion – Horse Pulling Capital of the U.P.
- Colon – Magic Capital of the World
- Curran – Black Bear Capital of Michigan
- Davison – City of Flags
- Detroit
  - America's Comeback City
  - Arsenal of Democracy
  - City of Trees
  - Hitsville, USA
  - Hockeytown
  - The Motor City
  - Motown
  - The D
  - The Paris of the Midwest
  - The Renaissance City
- Drummond Island – Gem of the Huron
- Dundee – Hub of the Highways
- Eaton Rapids – The Island City
- Eau Claire – Cherry Pit Spitting Capital of the World
- Elsie – Michigan's Dairy Capital
- Escanaba – Esky
- Fairview – Wild Turkey Capital of Michigan
- Flint
  - The Vehicle City
- Frankenmuth – Michigan's Little Bavaria
- Fremont – Baby Food Capital of the World
- Gaylord – Michigan's Alpine Village
- Glenn – The Pancake Town
- Grand Haven – Coast Guard City, USA
- Grand Rapids
  - Furniture City
  - Beer City USA
- Greenville – The Danish Festival City
- Hamtramck
  - City Within the City
  - The World Within Two Square Miles
- Holland – Tulip City
- Huntington Woods – City of Homes
- Jackson – Birthplace of the Republican Party
- Kalamazoo
  - Bedding Plant Capital of the World
  - Celery City
  - Kazoo (or K'Zoo)
  - Mall City (first outdoor pedestrian mall in the US)
  - The Paper City
- Kalkaska – Trout Capital of Michigan
- Kingsley – A Little Bit of Paradise
- Lake City – Christmas Tree Capital
- Linwood – Michigan's Walleye Capital
- Manistee – Salt City
- Marlette - The Heart of The Thumb
- Marquette – Queen City of the North
- Mayfield – Birthplace of the Adams Fly
- Mesick – Mushroom Capital of the World
- Mount Clemens – Bath City
- Mount Pleasant – The Oil Capital of Michigan
- Muskegon
  - The Beer Tent Capital of the World
  - Port City
  - The Riviera of the Midwest
  - Lumber Queen of the World
- Naubinway – Top of the Lake
- Negaunee – Irontown, USA
- Newberry – Moose Capital of Michigan
- Niles
  - The City of Four Flags
  - Garden City
- Northville – Switzerland of Wayne County
- Oceana County – Asparagus Capital of the World
- Omer – Michigan's Smallest City
- Onaway – Sturgeon Capital of Michigan
- Oscoda – Paddletown USA
- Paradise – Wild Blueberry Capital of Michigan
- Pellston – Icebox of the Nation
- Pinconning – Cheese Capital of Michigan
- Plainwell – The Island City
- Pontiac - The Yak
- Port Huron – Maritime Capital of the Great Lakes
- Portland – City of Two Rivers
- Rogers City
  - The Nautical City
  - Rocket City
- Romulus – Gateway to the World, Romtown
- Rudyard – Snowy Owl Capital of Michigan
- Saint Johns – The Mint City
- Saint Louis – Middle of the Mitten
- Sault Ste. Marie
  - The Soo
  - Michigan's Oldest City (founded 1668)
- Scottville - Clown Town
- Southfield - SFLD
- South Haven – Blueberry Capital of the World
- Sturgis – Electric City
- Taylor – Taylortucky
- Traverse City
  - Cherry Capital of the World
  - Hockeytown North
  - T City
  - The Bay Area
- Trufant – Stump Fence Capital of the World
- Utica
  - Hothouse Rhubarb Capital of the World
  - Mushroom Capital of Michigan
- Vassar – Cork Pine City
- Vicksburg – The Village with a Vision
- Whitefish Point – Cranberry Capital of Michigan
- Ypsilanti
  - Ypsi
  - Ypsiltucky

== See also ==
- List of city nicknames in the United States
- List of cities, villages, and townships in Michigan
