= Windsor Yacht Club =

Coordinates: 42°20′29″N 82°56′02″W

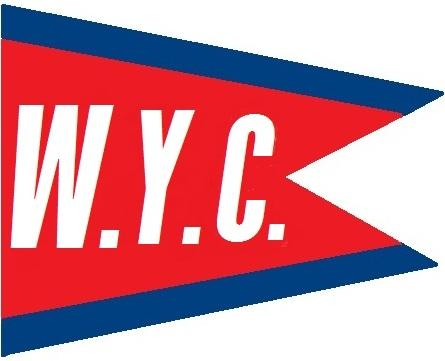
- Burgee
- Founded: 1937
- Location: Windsor, Ontario
- Website: www.windsoryachtclub.com

The Windsor Yacht Club (WYC) is a private yacht club in Windsor, Ontario. It is located on the Canadian mainland just south of Peche Island overlooking the Detroit River. The clubhouse overlooks the southern shore of Peche Island and is at the north-end of the Detroit River, which takes water from Lake St. Clair.

WYC is a member of the Detroit Regional Yacht-racing Association (DRYA) and the Inter-Lake Yachting Association (I-LYA).

== History ==
In 1936 a group of boat owners who occupied the marina that would soon become the Windsor Yacht Club decided to form an organization of boaters. A modest clubhouse was built where the present clubhouse stands. Over the winter of 1936 and 1937 meetings were held which led to the formation of the yacht club in 1937. The first major expansion occurred after World War II when in 1945 the Clubhouse was expanded for the addition of kitchen and dining facilities. The Club grew substantially in the 1960s with both more wells being constructed and the clubhouse being expanded and improved upon.

In the 1980s, the yacht club would have been sunk if not for the valiant efforts of the Yard and Docks Chairman Captain Gord Ritchie. Many times during harsh winters with northeastern winds bashing waves over the break wall the yacht club was submerged in icy cold water. Capt. Gord gathered volunteers to operate the pumps in order to keep the Yacht Club afloat. Every time the Detroit River water levels rose, volunteers were ready to fill and place sandbags surrounding the Yacht Cub.

The clubhouse was reconstructed in 2001. The Windsor Yacht Club celebrated its 75th anniversary in the year 2012.

=== Traditions ===
The Windsor Yacht Club still holds many of its traditions including:

Gentlemen do not wear hats in the clubhouse. When or if this occurs, the bartender rings a bell and the "offender" is obliged to treat those in attendance on the occasion. Exceptions to this rule may be made on medical or religious grounds.

The parking spot on the east side of the parking lot closest to the Club House door is reserved for the Commodore. Behind the bar, there are four vertical lights denoting the various flag officers of the club. The lights are illuminated when any of the above are in attendance at the club. Similarly if any of the above are in the dining room, a small flag is placed on their table signifying their flag positions.

There are several official functions held throughout the year at the club, including: Resurrection Day, Blessing of the Fleet, and Commodore's Ball.

== Directors ==
The Windsor Yacht Club has numerable directors who are in charge of the function of the club:

- Commodore
- Vice Commodore
- Rear Commodore
- Fleet Captain
- Past Commodore
- Treasurer
- Entertainment
- Membership
- Yards & Docks
- Race Chairman
- Secretary
- House Chairman
- Fleet Surgeon
- Fleet Chaplain

== Marina ==
Windsor Yacht Club has three harbours, one east of the clubhouse, one to the west, and the riverside harbour. The Windsor Yacht Club has over 62 slips (allowing vessels up to 60 feet in length). WYC extends its facilities (dining room, bar, swimming pool, harbour amenities) to members of reciprocal clubs, including members of (DRYA) and (I-LYA) affiliated clubs.

== Racing ==
Windsor Yacht Club is active in the sport of yacht racing and is a member of the Detroit Regional Yacht-racing Association (DRYA) along with 26 other clubs in the region. Windsor Yacht Club hosts races in Lake St. Clair. The club hosts a Spring series and a Fall series consisting of 7 races each. One-design classes that race include the J/120 and C&C 35, open classes include PHRF A, PHRF B, and JAM. WYC also hosts other races notable in the area, including the Chimo Race and the Canadian Club Regatta.
