= Midwest Cities Lacrosse Conference =

- MCLC logo
- Sport: Field Lacrosse
- Founded: 1990; 36 years ago (origins from 1972; 54 years ago)
- No. of teams: 14
- Country: United States
- Most recent champion: Motor City Lacrosse Club (2017)
- Most titles: Chicago Lacrosse Club (20)
- Website: midwestlacrosse.org

The Midwest Cities Lacrosse Conference (MCLC) is a senior/post-collegiate men's field lacrosse league based in the Midwestern United States. The MCLC was founded in 1990 as a merger between the "City Division" of the Midwest Club Lacrosse Association and the three-year-old Midwest Club Championship invitational tournament.

Teams are divided into east and west divisions based on their geographic location. Like most other lacrosse leagues, the MCLC plays its games during the Spring. Each season the top teams from the league meet in the playoffs to battle for the MCLC Championship.

== Teams ==
=== East Division ===
Team	City	Home field
Cincinnati Lacrosse Club	Cincinnati, Ohio	Clark Montessori High School
Cleveland Lacrosse Club	Cleveland, Ohio	Western Reserve Academy
Columbus Lacrosse Club	Columbus, Ohio	University School
Grand River Lacrosse Club	Grand Rapids, Michigan	Caledonia High School
Motor City Lacrosse Club	Detroit, Michigan	Troy Athens High School
Pittsburgh Lacrosse Club	Pittsburgh, Pennsylvania	Central Catholic High School

=== West Division ===
Team	City/Area	Home field
Chicago Lacrosse Club	Chicago, Illinois	Evergreen Bank Group Athletic Field
Chitown Lacrosse Club	Chicago, Illinois	Evergreen Bank Group Athletic Field
Lincoln Park Lacrosse Club	Chicago, Illinois	Belmont Harbor & Diversey Field
Minneapolis Lacrosse Club	Minneapolis, Minnesota	Benilde-St. Margaret's
Minnesota Lakers Lacrosse Club	Minneapolis, Minnesota	Benilde-St. Margaret's
Minnesota Premium Lacrosse Club	Minneapolis, Minnesota	Benilde-St. Margaret's
Sr. Gophers Lacrosse Club	Minneapolis, Minnesota	Hopkins High School
Windy City Lacrosse Club	Chicago, Illinois	Techny Prairie Park

=== Defunct teams ===
Team	Year folded
American General Lacrosse Club	1974
Lake Shore Lacrosse Club	2004
Circle City Lacrosse Club	2005
Three Rivers Lacrosse Club	2005
Canton Lacrosse Club	2007
Lansing Lacrosse Club	2008
Toledo Lacrosse Club	2008
Mt. Adams Lacrosse Club	2008
Northside Tribe Lacrosse	2009
Detroit-Windsor Lacrosse Club	?
Great Lakes Lacrosse Club	?
West Side Lacrosse Club	?

== Champions ==
Season	MCLA City Champion	Runner-up	Result
1972	Cleveland Lacrosse Club		
1973	Columbus Lacrosse Club		
1974	Chicago Lacrosse Club		
1975	American General Lacrosse Club		
1976	Columbus Lacrosse Club		
1977	Chicago Lacrosse Club		
1978	Columbus Lacrosse Club		
1979	Chicago Lacrosse Club		
1980	Columbus Lacrosse Club		
1981	Chicago Lacrosse Club		
1982	Columbus Lacrosse Club		
1983	Chicago Lacrosse Club		
1984	Columbus Lacrosse Club		
1985	Chicago Lacrosse Club		
1986	Columbus Lacrosse Club		
1987	Chicago Lacrosse Club		
1988	Windy City Lacrosse Club		
1989	Chicago Lacrosse Club/Windy City Lacrosse Club (disputed)		
1990	Chicago Lacrosse Club		
Season	MCLC Champion	Runner-up	Result
1991	Chicago Lacrosse Club		
1992	Chicago Lacrosse Club		
1993	Windy City Lacrosse Club		
1994	Chicago Lacrosse Club		
1995	Chicago Lacrosse Club		
1996	Chicago Lacrosse Club		
1997	Lake Shore Lacrosse Club		
1998	Chicago Lacrosse Club		
1999	Lake Shore Lacrosse Club		
2000	Lake Shore Lacrosse Club		
2001	Columbus Lacrosse Club		
2002	Columbus Lacrosse Club		
2003	Lake Shore Lacrosse Club		
2004	Cincinnati Lacrosse Club		
2005	Chicago Lacrosse Club		
2006	Columbus Lacrosse Club		
2007	Chicago Lacrosse Club		
2008	Chicago Lacrosse Club		
2009	Chicago Lacrosse Club		
2010	Chicago Lacrosse Club		
2011	none - vacated by Columbus Lacrosse Club	Lincoln Park Lacrosse Club	---
2012	Minnesota Lakers Lacrosse Club	Chicago Lacrosse Club	8-6
2013	Cleveland Lacrosse Club	Minnesota Lakers Lacrosse Club	5-4
2014	Windy City Lacrosse Club	Minnesota Lakers Lacrosse Club	12-9
2015	Minnesota Lakers Lacrosse Club	Motor City Lacrosse Club	17-11
2016	Motor City Lacrosse Club	Chicago Lacrosse Club	13-10
2017	Motor City Lacrosse Club	Cleveland Lacrosse Club	12-11
