= Bayview Yacht Club =

Yacht club in Detroit, Michigan

Coordinates: 42°21′32″N 82°57′13″W

Bayview Yacht Club (BYC)
- Burgee of the Bayview Yacht Club
- Formation: 1915
- Purpose: To advocate and serve as a public voice, educator and network for Recreational boating, and competitive sailors, coaches, volunteers and events
- Location: Detroit, Michigan United States
- Commodore: Lynn Kotwocki
- Affiliations: DRYA
- Website: Bayview Yacht Club

Bayview Yacht Club is private, sailing-focused yacht club located in Detroit, Michigan. Bayview is famous for hosting the Port Huron to Mackinac Boat Race as well as a number of other regional and local regattas.

Bayview is a member of the Detroit Regional Yacht-racing Association (DRYA).

== History ==
Bayview Yacht Club was founded in 1915 by four sailors, E. Lloyd Kurtzwarth, P.C. Williamson, Floyd Nixon and Paul Diedrich. In 1915, the club had only one boat, the 18-foot (5.5 m) Wrinkle, which Williamson sailed with the three other founders.

Bayview's first clubhouse was a two-story tin shanty built atop a floored-over boat well at the foot of what was then known as Motor Boat Lane, adjacent to Water Works Park. Bayview moved to its present clubhouse and harbor, at the foot of Clairpointe, in 1929–30.

Bayview Yacht Club's Port Huron to Mackinac Race has sailed annually since 1925.

Bayview is known as the Midwest's "Shrine to Nautical Culture".

== Facilities ==
Bayview occupies about 575 feet (175 m) along the Detroit River. Its facilities include two harbors with over 100 wells for vessels of varying length and beam. The club also has a crane for launching boats up to 50 feet (15 m), as well as storage for dry-docked boats. Bayview has shower facilities and a pump-out station.

The grounds include an 8,000-square-foot (740 m^{2}) club house, complete with a dining room, bar, and banquet space accommodating up to 250 guests. April 9, 2019 members learned at a "Renovation Reveal" party that the club house would be rebuilt. Work is completed and the new clubhouse opened in 2021.

Bayview also has a separate small-boat sailing center with several fleets of dinghies, a teaching center, and an observation deck overlooking the Detroit River.

== One-Design Fleets ==
Bayview Yacht Club is home to a number of competitive one-design fleets around the DRYA, including:

- Benetau 36.7
  - Held Nationals in 2015
- Cal 25
  - Held Nationals in 2004
- C&C 35
- J-120
- North American 40
- Melges 24
- Crescent Sailboat
- Express 27
- Tartan 10
  - Held Nationals in 2007
- Ultimate 20s

Formerly home to the very active L boat fleet until the early 70s
