= Soul Sisters Softball Team =

American softball team

The Soul Sisters Softball Team was Detroit's first all female, all African American softball team. The Motown Soul Sisters softball team was started in 1965 by a group of women who wanted to play softball in a public space. Women during this time did not have equal access to recreational facilities. The Soul Sisters were the only black team in an all-white league, in a city that was racially segregated. The Soul Sisters played on Jayne Field in the late 1960s and 1970s. As a top ranked team, they drew in a mixed-race crowd of hundreds of people.

== Race ==
Over the Soul Sisters' thirteen-year existence, tryouts were open to all women. At least three Caucasians and two Chicanas played on the team. Recreation supervisors told the Soul Sisters that as long as the team was all African American, it would have problems at tournaments. Barbara "Bubbles" Hardison, a white player, helped the team with her presence as well as her ability.

The Soul Sisters often faced discrimination while traveling to other states. In Georgia, they stopped at a truck stop to order some food. When the women went to order, the manager told them that he was out of food and could not serve them anything. Then, a white truck driver came up and ordered and was served. Some umpires would declare their equipment to be illegal and disqualified the team.

== Youth ==
The Soul Sisters organized events for young girls to come to Jayne Field and play softball. The team also organized basketball events for young girls.

== Gender ==
Parents worried about letting their daughters participate because of the fear of lesbianism. Playing softball was not considered ladylike. Females running, hitting or using their bodies in an assertive manner was not accepted by many people.

== Sources ==
- Enke, Anne (7 November 2007). Finding the Movement: Sexuality, Contested Space, and Feminist Activism. Durham, NC: Duke University Press. ISBN 978-0-8223-4083-6.
