= United Shore Professional Baseball League =

Independent baseball league

- Classification: Independent
- Sport: Baseball
- Founded: 2016; 10 years ago
- First season: 2016; 10 years ago
- Owner: Andy Appleby
- CEO: Andy Appleby
- President: Dana Schmitt
- No. of teams: 4
- Country: United States
- Venues: UWM Field; Utica, Michigan
- Continent: North America
- Most recent champion: Utica Unicorns
- Most titles: Utica Unicorns (6)
- Website: USPBL.com

The United Shore Professional Baseball League (USPBL), formally branded USPBL powered by Mortgage Matchup, is an independent baseball league in suburban Metro Detroit, Michigan, United States, started in May 2016. Each team in the USPBL plays a 45-game regular season schedule from May through September, with a mid-season all-star game and a championship game at the conclusion of the regular season. The games are played at UWM Field in Utica, Michigan.

== History ==
The United Shore Professional Baseball League was founded by Andy Appleby, a former senior vice president of the Detroit Pistons and Palace Sports and Entertainment. Justin Orenduff, a former first round pick of the Los Angeles Dodgers, is the former Director of Baseball Operations.

The league has four teams based in Metro Detroit, with all games being played at UWM Field in Utica, Michigan. The $12 million ballpark has seating for 2,000 and a total capacity of 4,000. It was built on capped brownfield that previously served as an unlicensed dump for household waste.

The league is aimed at 18- to 25-year-olds who either went undrafted out of college, or who have been released from prior minor league contracts. It is meant to give players recently graduated from college or with limited minor league experience a chance to stay in baseball shape, and give them an opportunity to be signed to contracts with MLB affiliated minor league teams. League revenue comes primarily from sponsorship partners and other advertisements, ticket sales and ballpark concessions. Current managers in the league include former Major League Baseball players Jim Essian and Paul Noce.

Fifty-two players from the USPBL have signed contracts with Major League Baseball organizations. During the 2019 season, pitcher Randy Dobnak became the first alum to advance all the way to the Major Leagues when he was called up to the Minnesota Twins on August 8, 2019. A second USPBL alum, Logan Gillaspie, was called up to the Baltimore Orioles on May 17, 2022. A third USPBL player, Jared Koenig, made his MLB debut with the Oakland Athletics during the 2022 season.

In 2026, the league rebranded its name from "USPBL powered by UWM" to "USPBL powered by Mortgage Matchup" as part of a naming rights partnership with United Wholesale Mortgage.

== Teams ==
- Birmingham-Bloomfield Beavers
- Eastside Diamond Hoppers
- Utica Unicorns
- Westside Woolly Mammoths

== Champions ==
USPBL champions
Season	Champion	Runner-up	Result
2016	Utica Unicorns	Birmingham-Bloomfield Beavers	5–0
2017	Birmingham-Bloomfield Beavers	Westside Woolly Mammoths	5–2
2018	Birmingham-Bloomfield Beavers	Eastside Diamond Hoppers	9–3
2019	Utica Unicorns	Westside Woolly Mammoths	6–5
2020	Utica Unicorns	Birmingham-Bloomfield Beavers	11–9
2021	Utica Unicorns	Eastside Diamond Hoppers	6–5
2022	Birmingham-Bloomfield Beavers	Utica Unicorns	8–6
2023	Utica Unicorns	Westside Woolly Mammoths	3–1
2024	Birmingham-Bloomfield Beavers	Utica Unicorns	3–2
2025	Eastside Diamond Hoppers	Westside Woolly Mammoths	16–5
2026	Utica Unicorns	Westside Woolly Mammoths	9–5
