= Crescent (keelboat) =

The Crescent Sailboat was built exclusively in Detroit, Michigan from 1953 to 1974. These boats were designed in 1953 by a Ford Motor Company engineer, Dick Hill and friends, who were experimenting with fiberglass. 27 hulls were constructed and raced One-Design. The class made a movement to become Olympic class boats at some point. The molds still exist and the boats are still raced very regularly. Bayview Yacht Club and the Detroit Sail Club are home to a great number of them.

The Crescent sloop was the first and currently oldest fiberglass racing One-Design class in the world. The boats are based at 95 St. Jean, Detroit Sail Club in Detroit, Michigan.

== Regattas ==
The Crescent Sloops race in the Detroit Regional Sailing Association series of races. These run from mid may thru the end of September. Other regattas include the Detroit NOOD (National Offshore One-Design) Regatta as well as the Bayview Yacht Club North Channel Race. The most significant is the ILYA Bayweek and GIYC Downriver and Deepwater. This series serves as the World Championship of Crescent Sloops.

Crescent Fleet under spinnaker

1953 First Launch

== Specification ==
The Crescent is 24 feet (7.3 m) long with a beam of about 6.5 feet (2.0 m). It is a fractionally rigged single spreader sloop with a combined sail area (Jib and Main) of 146.7 sq ft (13.63 m^{2}). Sail Measurements: Mainsail: Luff: 20.0 ft (6.1 m) - Leech: 21.3 ft (6.5 m) - Foot: 10.0 ft (3.0 m) - Sail area (main only) 102.5 sq ft (9.52 m^{2}).

Jib: Luff: 16.5 ft (5.0 m) - Foot: 6 ft (1.8 m) - Leech: 14.75 ft (4.50 m) - Sail are (jib only) 44.2 sq ft (4.11 m^{2}).

For other Detroit designed and built boats: see the L boat
