= Detroit Regional Yacht-racing Association =

The Detroit Regional Yacht-racing Association (DRYA) was established in 1912 as the Detroit River Yachting Association by the Commodores of the Detroit Boat Club and the Detroit Yacht Club, Commodore Harry Austin and Commodore Harry Kendall, respectively. Founded to be a clearing board to assist local clubs in resolving conflicts with their individual summer regatta calendars, the DRYA is now a Michigan corporation and a registered non-profit organization.

As of 2021, members included Bayview Yacht Club and two dozen others.

== Mission ==
The DRYA's incorporation articles summarize its purpose:

The purpose of the association is to encourage and promote, in the United States and Canada, the general interest in boating, yachting, and sail racing by amateur sailors (including junior and collegiate sailors) by all appropriate means, including:

- Establishing high standards of skill for seamanship, boat handling, and navigation of yachts;
- Encouraging the ownership of boats and yachts by individuals and member clubs and the development of suitable seaworthy yachts for racing and cruising;
- Encouraging and improving the quality of racing by developing and publishing standard sailing instructions, by assisting and supporting member clubs in coordinating the scheduling of races, regattas, and related events, by serving in an advisory capacity to member clubs in the organization, conduct and scoring of races and regattas, by providing equipment for conducting races and qualified judges to hear and decide protests and appeals and by any and all other appropriate means;
- Improving communications among member clubs and individuals interested in racing and in general, to make known to the member clubs the desires of sailors eligible to race in their regattas;
- Promoting, developing, adopting and equitably administering rating and handicapping rules for racing and providing handicaps to members and others;
- Maintaining membership in the United States Sailing Association as a "yacht racing association" and, from time to time, membership in other organizations with similar or related purposes;
- Acting as an intermediary between member clubs and individuals in their relations with civic and governmental bodies when the general interests and welfare of boating, yachting and sail racing are involved;
- Maintaining harmonious relations among its member clubs and individuals.

== Members ==
- Albatross Yacht Club
- Bayview Yacht Club
- Crescent Sail Yacht Club
- Detroit Boat Club
- Detroit Sail Club
- Detroit Yacht Club
- Doublehanded Sailing Association
- Edison Boat Club
- Ford Yacht Club
- Grayhaven Sail Club of Detroit
- Great Lakes Yacht Club
- Grosse Isle Yacht Club
- Grosse Pointe Club
- Grosse Pointe Sail Club
- Grosse Pointe Yacht Club
- Lake Shore Sail Club
- North Star Sail Club
- North Cape Yacht Club
- Pontiac Yacht Club
- Port Huron Yacht Club
- Sailing Singles
- Sarnia Yacht Club
- South Port Sailing Club
- St. Clair Yacht Club
- Toledo Yacht Club
- West Shore Sail Club
- Windsor Yacht Club
