= UWM Field =

Baseball field in Utica, Michigan, United States

Coordinates: 42.6260°N 83.0402°W

- Jimmy John's Field
- Interactive map of UWM Field
- Address: 7171 Auburn Road; Utica, Michigan 48317
- Owner: General Sports and Entertainment
- Operator: General Sports and Entertainment
- Capacity: 4,500
- Type: Baseball
- Surface: Artificial turf (2026-); Grass (2016-2025)
- Scoreboard: Yes
- Field size: Left Field - 315 feet (96 m); Center Field - 395 feet (120 m); Right Field - 320 feet (98 m)

Construction
- Groundbreaking: June 23, 2015
- Cost: $15 million
- Architect: Pendulum Studio

Tenants
- Utica Unicorns (USPBL) (2016-present); Birmingham-Bloomfield Beavers (USPBL) (2016-present); Eastside Diamond Hoppers (USPBL) (2016-present); Westside Woolly Mammoths (USPBL) (2017-present)

Website
- https://uspbl.com/jimmy-johns-field/

UWM Field, formerly Jimmy John's Field, is a ballpark in Utica, Michigan, home to four teams that play in the United Shore Professional Baseball League (USPBL), an independent baseball league. It opened on May 30, 2016.

== History ==
The ballpark is located in downtown Utica, just over twenty miles north of Detroit. UWM Field is owned by General Sports Entertainment (GSE); however, Utica's Downtown Development Authority will own the land it sits on and lease it to them for $1 per year for 30 years. The property was the site of a capped brownfield landfill that served as an unlicensed dump for household waste, that sat vacant the last 80 years.

General Sports created the USPBL. The USPBL is the first independent professional baseball league in the metropolitan Detroit area.

Construction began in June 2015 and the venue opened on May 30, 2016. The cost of the field was $15 million.

Naming rights were originally purchased by Jimmy John's, a sandwich restaurant chain.

In the park's first season it served all three teams as their home field, averaging 3,200 fans per game with over 200,000 fans total. Since its second season, it has also served as the home field for the Westside Woolly Mammoths.

The field served as the home of the NAIA Marygrove College Mustangs baseball team until athletics were dropped in December 2017. In addition, the park hosted an NCAA game in April 2017. The field now serves as the home of the NAIA Lawrence Technological University Blue Devils.

In 2026, the field was renamed "UWM Field" as part of a rebranding and naming rights partnership with United Wholesale Mortgage.

== Venue ==
The stadium has a total capacity of 4,500 fans, with 2,000 box seats between first and third base. It features 7 founder's level suites, 5 dugout suites, 12 patio suites, 4 picnic areas, and a grass berm. The ballpark also features a restaurant and bar on the concourse behind home plate.

In the right field corner there is a wiffle ball field and a playground.

The field has extremely wide foul territories, and a concert quality speaker system, allowing it to host other sports and events in the future.

Before the USPBL's second season, the stadium added 3 new bars, a concert stage in right field, and many new menu items.

== Awards ==
In September 2016, Jimmy John's Field won the CREW Detroit Impact Award in the special impact award category for its transformation of landfill parcels along the Clinton River.

In March 2017, the stadium project won the Engineering Eminent Conceptor Award from the American Council of Engineering Companies of Michigan.
