= The Forest City =

Nickname for the City of Cleveland

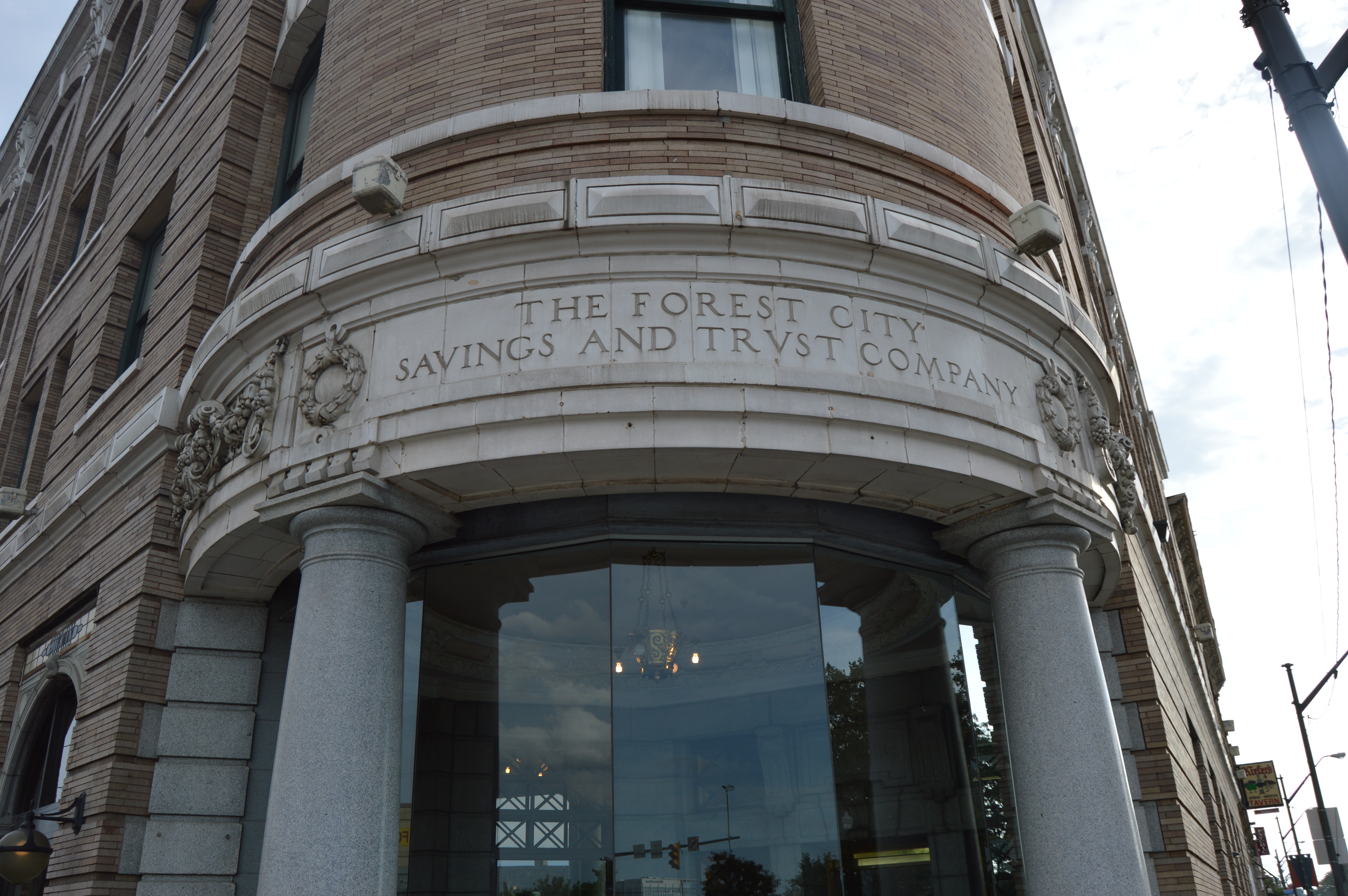
"The Forest City" is Cleveland's oldest nickname, as used here for the Forest City Bank Building in the Ohio City neighborhood.

The Forest City is a nickname or alternate toponym for the City of Cleveland, Ohio, United States. The inspiration for the name is a reference to Cleveland, describing a highly sophisticated society amid a heavily forested environment in Alexis de Tocqueville's Democracy in America, which contains the Frenchman's observations of the United States in the 1830s. Early use of the moniker is uncertain. Some say that Timothy Smead, editor of the short-lived Ohio City Argus first put the name to use. Many others believe that William Case, secretary of the Cleveland Horticultural Society and Cleveland's mayor from 1850 to 1851, carried the name forward. Case was well known for encouraging the planting of fruit trees, and thus the name stuck. By 1940, approximately 221,000 trees were growing in the city.

One of the earliest documented uses of the term "Forest City" in Cleveland was in 1834, when the Forest City Hook and Ladder volunteer firefighting company was chartered. In the late 1860s, the city's best baseball club adopted the name, became an independent professional team in 1870, and helped found the first professional league, the National Association, in 1871. The first National Association game was a visit by the Forest City club of Cleveland to the Kekionga club of Fort Wayne, Indiana on May 4, 1871. It is considered the first major league baseball game by those who count the National Association as a major league. The team folded after the 1872 season. During 1871, it was one of two National Association teams named "Forest City", the other being a team based in Rockford, Illinois.

By 2015 the number of trees in the city declined to 120,000, according to a City of Cleveland-funded initiative. Compared to other cities in the region, Cleveland has a relatively low percentage of its landscape protected by an urban tree canopy at only 19%. Cincinnati, Ohio in comparison has an urban tree canopy of 38%. According to a 2020 analysis by the Cleveland Tree Coalition, “areas with lower income and/or higher proportions of Black residents and residents of color have generally had lower tree canopy cover due to disinvestment. This variability leads to an inequitable distribution of tree canopy cover, meaning neighborhoods with lower tree canopy receive fewer benefits.”
