= Detroit Yacht Club =

- Emblem

- Burgee
- Short name: DYC
- Founded: 1868; 158 years ago
- Location: 1 Riverbank Rd., Belle Isle, Detroit, Michigan United States
- Website: www.dyc.com

The Detroit Yacht Club (DYC) is a private yacht club in Detroit, Michigan, located on its own island off of Belle Isle in the Detroit River between the MacArthur Bridge and the DTE generating plant. The DYC clubhouse is a restored 1920s Mediterranean-style villa that is the largest yacht club clubhouse in the United States.

DYC is a member of the Detroit Regional Yacht-racing Association (DRYA).

== History ==
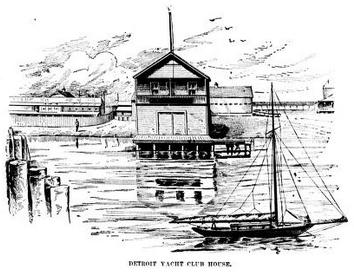
Detroit Yacht Club House, c. 1894

The club was founded by Detroit sailing enthusiasts in 1868. The first Yacht Club buildings, a small clubhouse and boatshed, were constructed in the late 1870s at the foot of McDougall Street, just south of Jefferson Avenue. In the early 1880s, the members were divided over the club's growing social activities, and in 1882, one group broke away to form the Michigan Yacht Club. The remainder elected James Skiffington Commodore (the club's title equivalent to the "President" of other recreational and social organizations) in 1884.

The original Belle Isle clubhouse was built at a cost of $10,000 (with a further $2,000 for furnishings) in 1891, but burned down in 1904. A new facility was quickly built at the same site.

In 1923, the present-day clubhouse was dedicated; its construction had cost more than one million dollars, the work of architect George D. Mason, who also designed the Detroit Masonic Temple (the world's largest) and the opulent Gem Theatre. By the end of the following year, membership had reached 3000. Prominent member and Commodore Gar Wood set world speed records in hydroplanes, and with his Gold Cup victories brought the club to national and even worldwide prominence. Beginning in 1921, the DYC started sponsoring the hydroplane races. Membership declined dramatically during the Great Depression, and some services were suspended.

In 1946, all bonds had been paid, and the club was debt-free. The club's women formed the first women's sailing organization in the country and raced the club's catboats. During the next decade, dining facilities would be expanded, and theater-quality projection equipment installed in the ballroom, where Sunday evening screenings became a regular feature of club life.

During the 1960s, an outdoor, Olympic-size swimming pool was added, and the West End docks were built, increasing the number of boat wells to over 350. The DYC has long been a symbol of privilege and exclusivity. Up until the 1970s, Black applicants were routinely rejected, until psychiatrist Dr. Leonard Ellison filed a lawsuit, and became the first Black member.

More recently, the club added additional facilities like a fitness center and opened the Bitter End lounge area to allow for women to enter. Before the restoration, the Bitter End could only be accessed through the men's locker room. The newly restored Bitter End is also used for hosting small parties.

In 2018, the Detroit Yacht Club celebrated its sesquicentennial (150th) anniversary. Raymond W. Batt Jr. was elected to serve as the Commodore of the Detroit Yacht Club during the sesquicentennial year.

== Clubhouse ==
- Detroit Yacht Club
- U.S. National Register of Historic Places
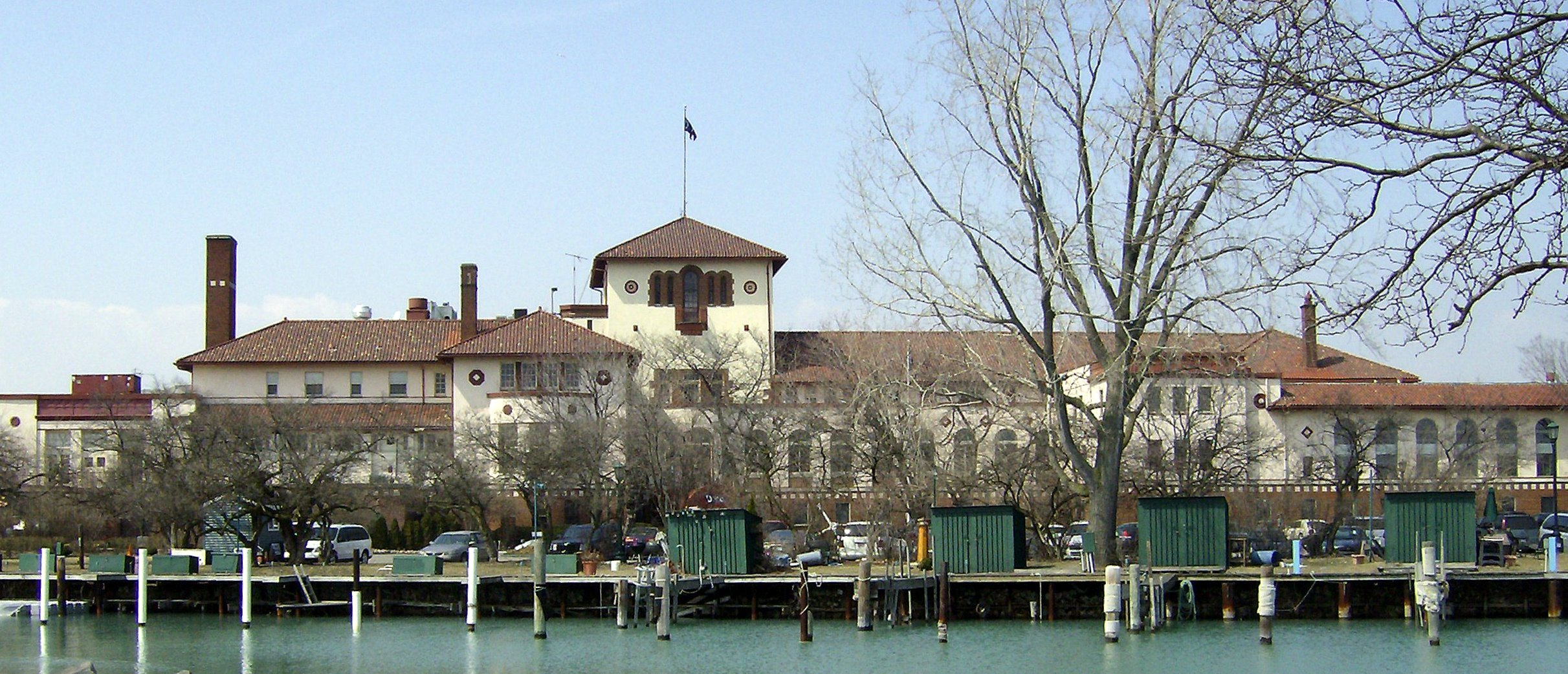
- Clubhouse and docks
- Coordinates: 42°20′56″N 82°58′25″W
- Built: 1924
- Architect: George D. Mason
- Architectural style: Mediterranean Revival
- NRHP reference No.: 11000309
- Added to NRHP: May 25, 2011

The Detroit Yacht Club clubhouse was designed by architect George D. Mason in a Mediterranean Revival style. The building sits on a man-made island constructed from fill dirt excavated from other construction projects. The cornerstone of the building was laid in 1922 by Gar Wood and the building was completed in 1923. The clubhouse is a rambling, informal structure. Of particular note are the two grand staircases and the wood-panelled second-floor ballroom.

== Facilities ==
- Racquetball Courts
- Indoor and Outdoor Pools
- Outdoor Hot Tub
- Outdoor Tennis courts
- Bocce Ball Court
- Volleyball Court
- Indoor and outdoor restaurant
- Marina for over 300 boats

== Annual events ==
- Officer's Ball (Often called Commodore's Ball)
- Vice Commodore's Ball (Also called Clean-up Day)
- Memorial Day Celebration
- Hydroplane Racing Weekend
- Venetian Weekend

== Groups within the club ==
- The Outriggers
- The Pelicans
- Metro Club
- The Flying Scots
- Ski Club
- Garden Club
- Sea Serpents
- Kayak Club
- Rod and Gun club
- The Voyagers
- The Seagulls
- DYC Business Networking group
- DYC Swim Team (MICSA League)

== Notable members ==
- Gar Wood (former Commodore)
- Edsel Ford
- Horace Dodge
- Charles Kettering
- Gus Schantz
- Fred Fisher
- Robert Oakman
