= Hockeytown =

Moniker for a town with a connection to ice hockey

Hockeytown and Hockey Town are generic words used in common practice throughout the United States and Canada to identify any town, city or community that has a history and reputation of participating in the sport of ice hockey. "Hockeytown" when combined with their "winged wheel" logo are a registered trademark of the Detroit Red Wings. Other North American cities are and have been referred to by the name. Warroad, Minnesota was the first city known to use the designation "Hockeytown". The term has been used to describe the following cities:

- Berlin, New Hampshire – Earned the title in 2002, after almost 90 years of a rich hockey history. Claims to be the breeding ground for some of the best players.
- Binghamton, New York has been referred to as Hockey Town since the mid-1970s. After a tepid first year of support, the Broome Dusters grew greatly in popularity, and were able to draw many sellouts. The quick success led the Hockey News to declare Binghamton as Hockey Town USA. Binghamton is home to a Federal Prospects Hockey League franchise.
- Denver, Colorado – Earned the title in 2022, after the Colorado Avalanche won the Stanley Cup, the University of Denver Pioneers won the NCAA National Championship, the Denver East Angels won the USA Hockey High School National Championship, and the Pee-Wee Jr. Avs won the Quebec International Pee-Wee tournament. In addition the Colorado Warriors (Disabled Veteran hockey) of the Warrior hockey discipline within USA Hockey won 2 championships in 3 divisions (including the top tier) of the 2022 USA Hockey Warrior Classic (National Championship) in Detroit, MI, October 30, 2022. The Avalanche and the Pioneers became the first professional and college teams from the same city to win the Stanley Cup and the NCAA Division I National Championship in the same year since the Boston Bruins and the Boston University Terriers in 1972.
- Detroit, Michigan – The phrase "Hockeytown", when combined with the distinctive winged wheel logo of the NHL's Detroit Red Wings, is a registered trademark owned by the franchise. Until the 2018–19 season, the Hockeytown script and the Red Wings logo were used in their days at Joe Louis Arena and for the first season at Little Caesars Arena. The team would bring it back for the 2025–26 season, in which the team celebrated their centennial anniversary. Since the following 2026–27 season, it has returned as a permanent fixture at Little Caesars Arena.
  - Traverse City, Michigan has been referred to as "Hockeytown North", due to the Red Wings' training camp being located at Traverse City's Centre Ice Arena.
- Montreal, Quebec has been described as the "Best Hockey City in North America". The first indoor ice hockey game was played in the city, on 3 March 1875. The formalized modern sport of ice hockey originated in Montreal in 1877.
- O'Leary, Prince Edward Island has been described as "Hockeytown, PEI."
- Pembroke, Ontario is designated as "Hockeytown Canada" and is painted on the city's water tower
- Warroad, Minnesota has been referred to as "Hockeytown" for over 50 years. The town of 1,800 has produced five NHL players, seven Olympians, and more than 80 Division I ice hockey (men and women combined) players. Each of the U.S. Men's Olympic gold-medal teams had players from Warroad. The Hockeytown Holiday Classic has been played in Warroad since 1994.

The phrase "hockey town" has also been applied to Boston, Massachusetts; Buffalo, New York; Dallas, Texas; Nashville, Tennessee; Philadelphia, Pennsylvania; Saint Paul, Minnesota; Pardubice, Czech Republic; Sarpsborg, Norway; and Skellefteå, Sweden.
