= City of Champions =

City of Champions may refer to:

== City nicknames ==
- Artesia, New Mexico
- Brockton, Massachusetts
- Inglewood, California
- Los Angeles, California, see List of city nicknames in California
- Detroit, Michigan
- Duncanville, Texas
- One of several Boston nicknames
- One of several nicknames for Pittsburgh
- One of several nicknames for Tampa; see List of city nicknames in Florida
- Former official slogan of Edmonton, Alberta

== Other uses ==
- Countess, a riverboat in Pittsburgh's Gateway Clipper Fleet formerly named City of Champions
- SoFi Stadium, a stadium in Inglewood, California, known as City of Champions Stadium during planning

== See also ==
- Titletown (disambiguation)
