= WLZR =

Coordinates: 28°7′41.1″N 80°42′28.2″W

- Melbourne, Florida; United States
- Broadcast area: Space Coast
- Frequency: 1560 kHz
- Branding: Sports Radio The Fan

Programming
- Format: Sports
- Affiliations: Infinity Sports Network

Ownership
- Owner: Cumulus Media; (Cumulus Licensing LLC)
- Sister stations: WAOA-FM; WHKR; WROK-FM

History
- First air date: March 8, 1968 (as WTAI)
- Last air date: March 14, 2025
- Former call signs: WTAI (1968–1997); WTMS (1997–2000); WAOA (2000–2003); WINT (2003–2012)

Technical information
- Licensing authority: FCC
- Facility ID: 60388
- Class: D
- Power: 5,000 watts day
- Translator: 107.9 W300DL (Melbourne)

Links
- Public license information: Public file; LMS

WLZR (1560 AM) was a commercial radio station, licensed to Melbourne, Florida, and serving the Melbourne-Titusville-Cocoa area of the Space Coast. It was owned by Cumulus Media and broadcast a sports radio format. Most of the programming came from the Infinity Sports Network. It operated from 1968 to 2025.

By day, WLZR was powered at 5,000 watts, non-directional. Because 1560 AM is a clear channel frequency reserved for WFME in New York City, WLZR was a daytimer. It went off the air at sunset to avoid interference with older, higher power stations.

== History ==
In 1968, the station signed on as WTAI. WTAI is credited as the first progressive rock station in the South. The air staff included Jim Kennedy, Lee Arnold, Peter David Kaufman, Steve Mack and Kim Conners (Sharma Kinsel). It was an extremely musically adventurous station with a wide and deep playlist created from the top progressive rock albums of the day.

An early DJ was Bryan Norcross, on-air as Barry O'Brien, who later became a well-known meteorologist for his coverage of Hurricane Andrew.

It switched its call sign to WTMS in 1997, WAOA in 2000 and WINT in 2003.

Previous logo

In October 2008, WINT flipped from an oldies format to sports radio, affiliated with ESPN Radio. On February 25, 2011, WINT went silent. On December 13, 2014, WLZR returned to the air, simulcasting sports-formatted WSJZ 95.9 FM. On April 1, 2015, WLZR split from its simulcast with WSJZ (which switched an active rock format). WLZR rebranded as "Sports Radio 1560 The Fan".

WLZR ceased operators March 14, 2025. It was one of 11 Cumulus stations to close the weekend of March 14, as part of a larger shutdown of underperforming Cumulus stations, and one of four defunct Cumulus stations to surrender their licenses that September. The Federal Communications Commission cancelled the station's license on September 29, 2025. WLZR's afternoon show, hosted by program director Mark Moses (who remained with Cumulus as the program director and midday host at WROK-FM, the former WSJZ), continues as an Internet video program and podcast; by the time of the closure, WLZR's other programming was supplied by the Infinity Sports Network.
