= Space Coast (disambiguation) =

Space Coast may refer to:

- Space Coast, Florida, USA; the region surrounding Cape Canaveral and the Kennedy Space Center
- Space Coast Regional Airport, Florida, USA
- USSSA Space Coast Complex, baseball stadium in Viera, Florida, USA
- Space Coast Junior/Senior High School, Port St. John, Florida, USA
- Brevard County, Florida, USA; the county containing Cape Canaveral and the Kennedy Space Center, with many county organs named "Space Coast"

== See also ==
- Coast (disambiguation)
- Space (disambiguation)
