= WSJZ =

WSJZ may refer to:

- WSJZ-LD, a low-power television station (channel 34, virtual 42) licensed to serve Salisbury, Maryland, United States
- KBGG, a radio station (1700 AM) licensed to Des Moines, Iowa, United States, which held the call sign WSJZ in from June 6 to June 20, 2002
- WBQT (FM), a radio station (96.9 FM) licensed to Boston, Massachusetts, United States, which held the call sign WSJZ from 1997 to 1999
- WBUF, a radio station (92.9 FM) licensed to Buffalo, New York, United States, which held the call sign WSJZ from 1995 to 1997
- WGUO, a radio station (94.9 FM) licensed to Reserve, Louisiana, United States, which held the call sign WSJZ from 2000 to 2002
- WROK-FM, a radio station (95.9 FM) licensed to Sebastian, Florida, United States, which held the call sign WSJZ-FM from 2003 to 2016
