= WAOA-FM =

Coordinates: 28.137°N 80.703°W

- Melbourne, Florida; United States
- Broadcast area: Space Coast–Melbourne; –Titusville, Florida–; Cocoa, Florida
- Frequency: 107.1 MHz
- Branding: 107.1 A1A

Programming
- Language: English
- Format: Contemporary hit radio
- Affiliations: United Stations Radio Networks; Westwood One

Ownership
- Owner: Cumulus Media; (Cumulus Licensing LLC)
- Sister stations: WHKR; WROK-FM

History
- First air date: November 10, 1972
- Former call signs: WTAI-FM (1972–1978); WLLV (1978–1984); WVTI (1984–1989); WAOA (1989–2000)
- Call sign meaning: reference to Florida State Road A1A

Technical information
- Licensing authority: FCC
- Facility ID: 60387
- Class: C1
- ERP: 100,000 watts
- HAAT: 148 meters (486 ft)

Links
- Public license information: Public file; LMS
- Webcast: Listen live; Listen live (via Audacy); Listen live (via iHeartRadio)
- Website: www.wa1a.com

WAOA-FM (107.1 MHz) is a commercial radio station licensed to Melbourne and covering Florida's Space Coast. Owned by Cumulus Media, it broadcasts a contemporary hit radio radio format. It calls itself "107.1 A1A", named after Coastal Florida highway State Road A1A. The radio studios and offices are on West Hibiscus Boulevard in Melbourne.

WAOA-FM has an effective radiated power (ERP) of 100,000 watts, the maximum power for non-grandfathered FM stations. Its transmitter is in Melbourne, on Harlock Road, visible from Interstate 95. As of October 2007, the station was streamed online and can be accessed via iHeartRadio, Audacy, TuneIn, or directly on WAOA's website.

== History ==
In November 1972, the station signed on as WTAI-FM with an adult contemporary music format. It was the FM sister station to WTAI (1560 AM). WTAI-FM briefly aired a beautiful music format in 1978. Then on July 10, 1978, it changed its call sign to WLLV, and its format to Contemporary Christian music. On February 24, 1984, the call sign was switched to WVTI, and the format flipped to contemporary hit radio.

On December 15, 1989, the station changed call signs again, becoming WAOA, and changed its format to hot adult contemporary. It adjusted to mainstream adult contemporary in 1996, then back to CHR in 2002, a year after the station was bought by Cumulus. The call sign was modified to WAOA-FM on June 29, 2000, when its AM sister station became WAOA.

WAOA-FM is often ranked the most-listened-to radio station in the Cocoa Beach-Melbourne-Titusville Nielsen Audio market.
