= Space Chase =

Space Chase may refer to:

- Space Chase USA, a 2019 American PBS television film documentary about the Apollo space program and its effects on a small Florida town.
- "Space Chase", a song by Hawkwind from their 1980 album Levitation
- Spacechase, an Atari 2600 video game
- Space Chase (album), an album by German acid jazz group, Tab Two
- Space Chase, the 2005 British short film from Catsnake Studios featuring elements of Parkour and featured in Parkour Journeys (2006)
- Space Chase, the pre-production name for television show Farscape
