= Gloria Biggs =

American publisher

Gloria Neustadt Biggs (1911-2001) was an American publisher. By being named publisher of the Space Coast newspaper The Melbourne Times in 1973, she became the first female publisher of a Gannett paper.

== Life ==
Biggs was born in New York City on September 18, 1911.

Before becoming publisher, she was an editor at the St. Petersburg Times (now the Tampa Bay Times) and The Palm Beach Post. She was also editor and publisher of The Evening Times.

She died on June 12, 2001, of natural causes in Annapolis, Maryland. Her husband, concert pianist Scott Biggs had predeceased her in 1981.
