= WROK =

WROK may refer to:

- WROK (AM) 1440 in Rockford, Illinois
- WROK-FM, a radio station (95.9 FM) licensed to serve Sebastian, Florida, United States
- WLXF 105.5 in Macon, Georgia, which held the call sign WROK-FM from 2009 to 2016
- "WROK TV" Government-access television (GATV) channel on cable TV in Royal Oak, Michigan
