= Nancy Yasecko =

American film director

Nancy Yasecko is a media artist and educator who grew up and is still living on the Space Coast of Florida. She graduated from Cocoa Beach High School in 1972 and received her B.A. from the University of South Florida in 1975, and her M.A. in Instructional Technology from the University of Central Florida 1997.

== Biography ==
Nancy Yasecko is the proprietor of Vanguard Productions, located on Merritt Island, FL, a producer of film and video for PBS broadcast and non-profit and governmental organizations.

Her film Growing Up with Rockets was included with the first group of US documentaries to be screened in the former Soviet Union in the American Documentary Showcase, Glastnost Tour 1990. The source materials used in the film are held by the Smithsonian National Air and Space Museum.

== Educational work ==
- Arts Mentor - Space Coast FIRST Robotics Competition Team 233
- Launchpad to Learning - Interactive web-based engineering environment for middle school students
- Vanguard Productions—Development of film and video media for PBS, non-profit and governmental organizations
- Instructional Designer for online corporate training and assessment

== Filmography ==
- Mapping, 1978, producer and director
- Missiles, 1978, producer and director
- Composition, 1979, producer and director
- Soft Sand, 1980, producer and director
- Dancing Lessons, 1981, producer and director
- Nebraska Avenue, 1981, producer and director
- Growing Up with Rockets, 1986, producer, director, editor
- Living in America: A Hundred Years of Ybor City, 1985, editor
- Journey Into Wilderness: Florida's Indian River Lagoon, 1990, producer and director
- "History In Song (Series), 1992, producer and director
  - "Encounters in a New World", "Florida Stories: History and Legend", and "Changing Florida: Dreams and Realities" producer and director
- Moon Shot, 1994, Associate Producer and Line producer
- Brevard County Oral History Video Project, 1992–1995, producer and director
- Ellis Marsalis: Jazz is Spoken Here, 2000, producer and director
- Entre Act, 2004, producer and director
- Making Movies with Bud, 2005, producer and director
- The FIRST Robot Rock Opera, 2007, producer and director
