= Cocoa Beach, Florida =

City in the United States

- City
- City of Cocoa Beach
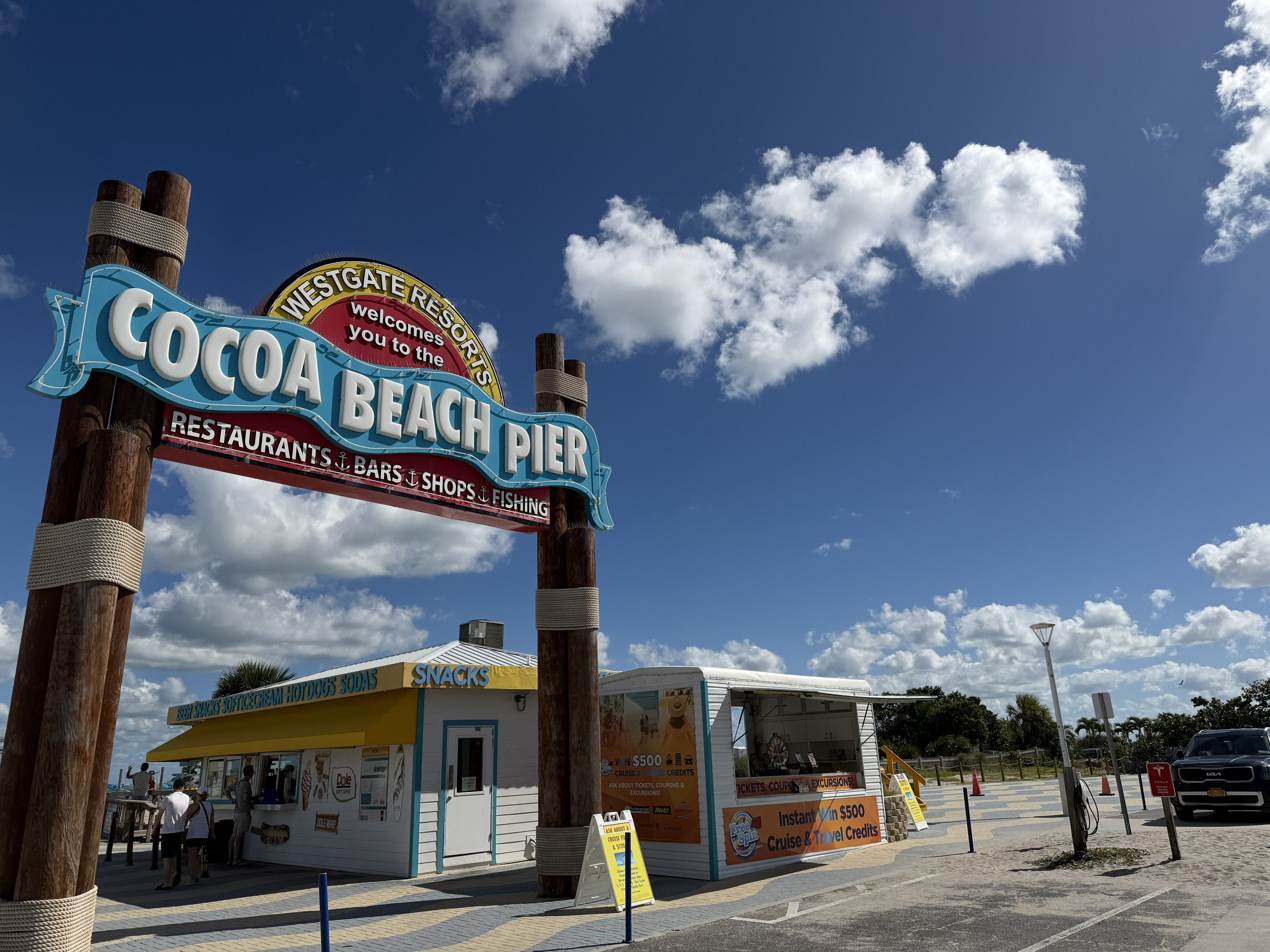
- Cocoa Beach Pier

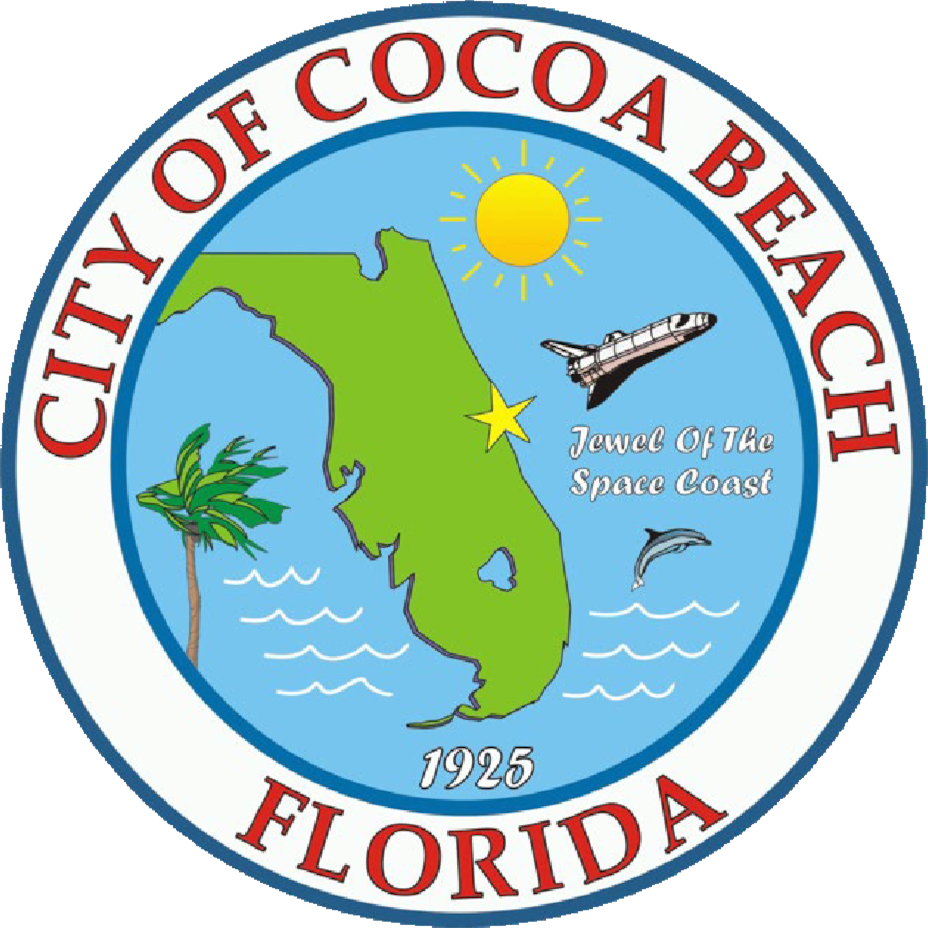
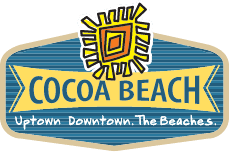
- Flag Seal Logo
- Nickname: The beach city
- Motto(s): "Uptown. Downtown. The Beaches." "Open for Business!"
- Location in Brevard County and the state of Florida

- Location within the state of Florida Location within the United States
- Coordinates: 28°19′12.7956″N 80°36′31.9356″W
- Country: United States
- State: Florida
- County: Brevard
- Settled (Oceanus Settlement): 1888
- Incorporated (Town of Cocoa Beach): June 5, 1925
- Incorporated (City of Cocoa Beach): June 29, 1957

Government
  - Type: Commission-Manager
  - Mayor: Keith Capizzi
  - Vice Mayor: Jesse Ross
  - Commissioners: Joshua Jackson, Karalyn Woulas, and Jeremy Hutcherson
  - City Manager: Robin R. Hayes
  - City Clerk: Loredana Kalaghchy

Area
  - Total: 15.19 sq mi (39.34 km^{2})
  - Land: 4.66 sq mi (12.06 km^{2})
  - Water: 10.53 sq mi (27.28 km^{2})
- Elevation: 9.8 ft (3 m)

Population (2020)
  - Total: 11,354
  - Density: 2,437.4/sq mi (941.07/km^{2})
- Time zone: UTC−5 (Eastern (EST))
  - Summer (DST): UTC−4 (EDT)
- ZIP code: 32931
- Area code: 321
- FIPS code: 12-33450
- GNIS feature ID: 0284502
- Website: cityofcocoabeach.com

Cocoa Beach is a city in Brevard County, Florida, United States. The population was 11,354 at the 2020 United States census, up from 11,231 at the 2010 census. It is part of the Palm Bay–Melbourne–Titusville, Florida Metropolitan Statistical Area.

== History ==
The first non-native settlement in the area was by a family of freed slaves following the American Civil War. In 1888, a group of men from Cocoa bought the entire tract of land, which went undeveloped until it was bought out in 1923 by a member of the group—Gus Edwards, Cocoa's city attorney. At that time, Edwards' total holdings included approximately 600 acres (240 ha). He stopped practicing law to devote all his efforts to developing the area.

Prior to incorporation, the area was known as Oceanus. The Town of Cocoa Beach was established on June 5, 1925. Cocoa Beach's first official meeting was held at the Cocoa Beach Casino on July 27, 1925, and adopted the City Seal. Gus C. Edwards was elected as mayor and served as a commissioner along with J.A. Haisten, and R.Z. Grabel. A little less than a month later, plans for a pier became official.

In 1935, the FDOT opened up what is now State Road A1A as a one-lane dirt road to Eau Gallie. In 1938, a Deputy Marshal was appointed "to act in emergencies at night or at other times" for $.25/hour. By 1939, the town had 49 residents. In 1940, the town requested that State Road 140 (now A1A) be routed on Orlando Avenue instead of Atlantic Avenue. In 1942, the town prepared to receive men assigned to the newly opened Naval Air Station Banana River. Establishing regular garbage collection was discussed when the town discovered that the Air Station was having theirs collected.

On May 1, 1942, the German submarine U-109 torpedoed the La Paz off the shore of Cocoa Beach. The crew was able to beach it with the help of tugs. Eventually it was returned to shipping. On May 3, the same U-boat sank the SS Laertes near the same spot. Local boys were recruited for salvaging efforts and to rid the beach of subsequent debris. Shortly thereafter, the federal government realized the danger of back-lighting from the coast making easy targets of passing ships and ordered a blackout for the remainder of the war.

During World War II, Cocoa Beach experienced money shortages to pay employees or to fix roads. In 1944, the town successfully fought a bill introduced in the Florida legislature which would have dissolved the city government. In 1947 a single police officer was hired for $1/hour. The same year, the city constructed works for the distribution of potable water. In 1950, a volunteer fire department was created which used a second-hand vehicle. In 1950, a proposal to prevent people from driving on the beach was defeated. In 1951, the city sought to place a stoplight, the city's first, at the intersection of what is now A1A and Minutemen Causeway. In 1953, the city decided to mark the names of all streets. That same year, the city planned to pave A1A south from 520 down Orlando Avenue. The city intended to bear 1/3 of the costs, the adjacent property owners, 2/3.

In 1954, the Women's Club opened a library in the building used by the Fire Department. In 1955, the speed limit in most of the town was raised to 35 miles per hour (56 km/h). In 1955, the city prepared to house the people who were going to be launching missiles from what is now Cape Canaveral Air Force Station.

In 1956, the city attorney warned the council that Blacks might attempt to use the beach. If they did, he recommended clearing the beach of all persons, both white and black. The 1954 decision, Brown v. Board of Education, had, in theory at least, integrated all general public facilities. Actual integration came later.

The city proposed selling the town dump to the school board for a junior high school, in order to keep students from being bused to Merritt Island.

On June 29, 1957, the town of Cocoa Beach incorporated into a city. It sold its water system to Cocoa, Florida and contracted with them to furnish water.

In September 1959, the city voted to add more sidewalks, improve the streets in residential areas as well as the main streets, and to pave more roads.

In 1961, Ron-Jon opened their first store locally.

In 1965, Cocoa Beach High School requested that Cocoa Avenue, the street that the school was located on, be renamed Minutemen Boulevard, in honor of the school's mascot, the Minuteman.

Cocoa Beach experienced rapid growth during the 1950s and 1960s. The population increased from 246 in 1950 to 3,475 in 1960 (1413% increase for 1950–1960) and to 9952 in 1970 (286% increase for 1960–1970). NASA's John F. Kennedy Space Center is located approximately 15 miles (24 km) north of town. Many people moved to Cocoa Beach due to jobs connected to the space program and in search of new opportunities.

After crewed space flights, the town held parades in honor of the astronauts.

After NASA's Apollo program came to an end, and before the Space Shuttle program was in full swing, the town's economy reflected the resulting layoffs. At one point, in 1975, unemployment was 14.3%. Many families lost their jobs or simply moved away. The housing market plummeted and some people unable to sell their homes simply abandoned them.

Cocoa Beach was the setting for the 1960s sitcom I Dream of Jeannie, although no episodes were actually filmed there, and star Barbara Eden only made two visits during the show's production—both in 1969, for publicity. Cocoa Beach High School was used as the school in the 2002 movie Race to Space.

In 2002, 69% of the voters capped building height to 45 feet (14 m). Prior construction and later variances, resulted in about 80 buildings between 45 and 70 feet (14 and 21 m) high, as of 2018.

The 2010 Nebula Awards were held in the city.

In 2016, the largest mansion in the city was destroyed by fire. It had been built on the beach by Al Neuharth in 1975. It contained 10,000 square feet (930 m^{2}) of living space, 11 bedrooms and 12 bathrooms. It was valued at several million dollars.

== Geography ==
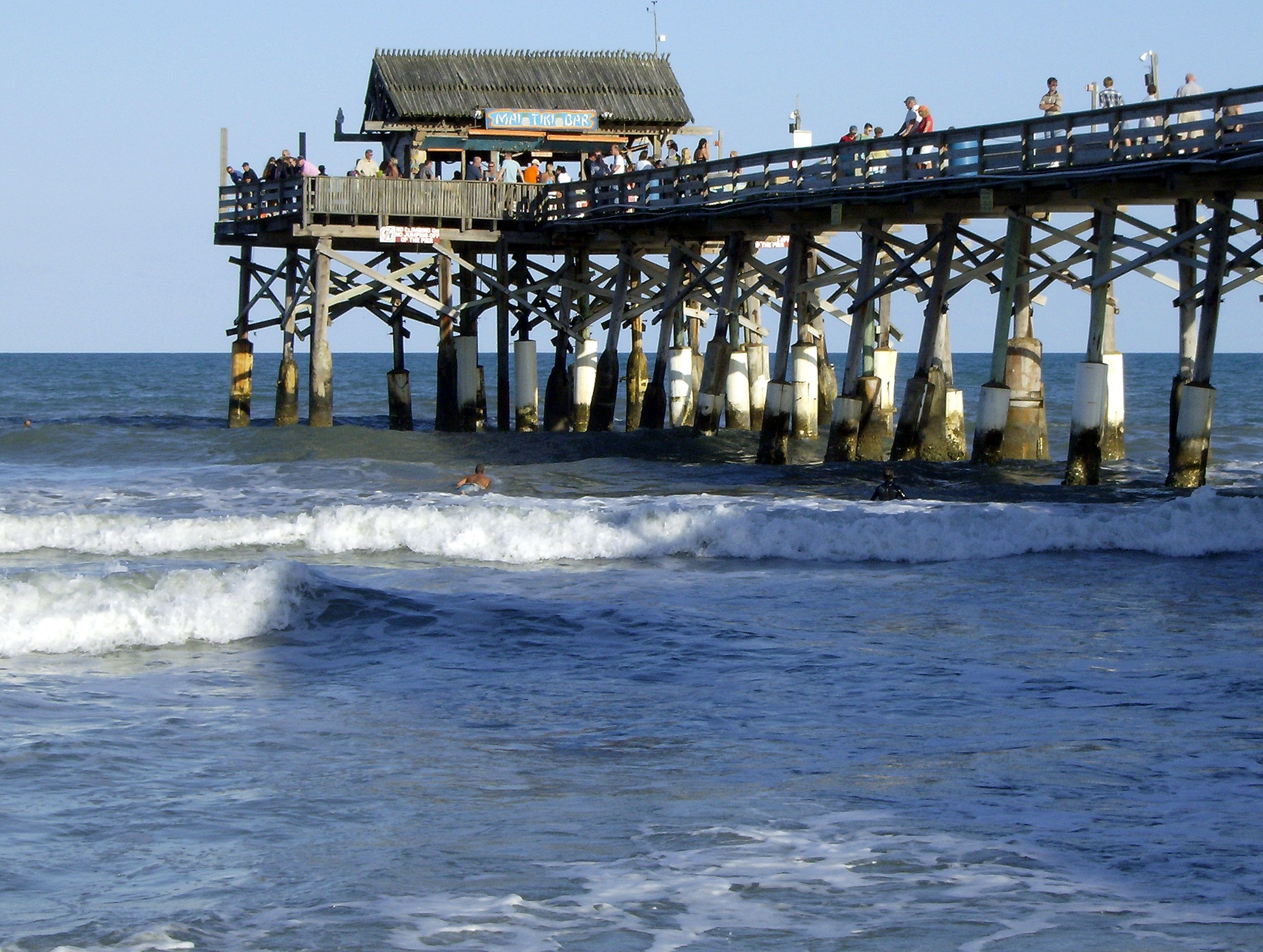
Cocoa Beach Pier, built in 1962, extends into the Atlantic Ocean

According to the United States Census Bureau, the city has a total area of 15.0 square miles (39 km^{2}). 4.9 square miles (13 km^{2}) of it is land and 10.1 square miles (26 km^{2}) of it (67.49%) is water. Bordering the city on the north is Cape Canaveral; on the south is Crescent Beach; on the east is the Atlantic Ocean (5.6 mi or 9.0 km of oceanfront); on the west is the Banana River.

Propelled by a powerful hurricane, the ocean pushed its way through the barrier islands centuries ago and formed the Thousand Islands in the Banana River.

There are a number of boating channels dredged in the area: the 0–99 Channel, the 100 Channel, the 200 Channel for houseboats, the 300 Channel, the 400 Channel near housing for private boats, the 500 Channel and the 600 Channel. Dredged material is placed on one of the Thousand Islands, but is now controlled.

Many of the homes in Cocoa Beach are built on dredged mud and sand from the Banana River.

=== Surrounding areas ===
- Merritt Island
- Atlantic Ocean
- Cape Canaveral
- South Cocoa Beach

=== Climate ===
Cocoa Beach's has a humid subtropical climate Köppen climate classification of Cfa. This climate features hot and humid summers with frequent tropical downpours and daily thundershowers, and warm, dry, and sunny winters. The average high temperature in the warmest month (July) in Cocoa Beach is 91 °F (33 °C) and the average high in the coolest month (January) is 72 °F (22 °C).

Climate data for Cocoa Beach
Month	Jan	Feb	Mar	Apr	May	Jun	Jul	Aug	Sep	Oct	Nov	Dec	Year
Record high °F (°C)	89 (32)	92 (33)	93 (34)	97 (36)	99 (37)	101 (38)	102 (39)	101 (38)	98 (37)	96 (36)	91 (33)	90 (32)	102 (39)
Mean daily maximum °F (°C)	71 (22)	74 (23)	77 (25)	81 (27)	86 (30)	89 (32)	91 (33)	91 (33)	88 (31)	84 (29)	79 (26)	73 (23)	82 (28)
Daily mean °F (°C)	60 (16)	63 (17)	66 (19)	71 (22)	77 (25)	81 (27)	82 (28)	82 (28)	81 (27)	76 (24)	70 (21)	63 (17)	73 (23)
Mean daily minimum °F (°C)	49 (9)	52 (11)	55 (13)	60 (16)	67 (19)	72 (22)	73 (23)	73 (23)	73 (23)	68 (20)	60 (16)	53 (12)	63 (17)
Record low °F (°C)	17 (−8)	27 (−3)	25 (−4)	35 (2)	47 (8)	55 (13)	60 (16)	60 (16)	57 (14)	41 (5)	30 (−1)	21 (−6)	17 (−8)
Average precipitation inches (mm)	2.27 (58)	2.63 (67)	3.28 (83)	2.13 (54)	3.29 (84)	6.71 (170)	5.96 (151)	7.68 (195)	7.64 (194)	5.06 (129)	2.88 (73)	2.57 (65)	52.1 (1,323)
Source: Weather.com

== Demographics ==
Historical population
Census	Pop.	Note	%±
1930	31		—
1940	49		58.1%
1950	246		402.0%
1960	3,475		1,312.6%
1970	9,952		186.4%
1980	10,926		9.8%
1990	12,123		11.0%
2000	12,482		3.0%
2010	11,231		−10.0%
2020	11,354		1.1%
U.S. Decennial Census

=== Racial and ethnic composition ===
Cocoa Beach racial composition (Hispanics excluded from racial categories) (NH = Non-Hispanic)
Race	Pop 2010	Pop 2020	% 2010	% 2020
White (NH)	10,457	9,940	93.11%	87.55%
Black or African American (NH)	83	88	0.74%	0.78%
Native American or Alaska Native (NH)	33	23	0.29%	0.20%
Asian (NH)	169	187	1.50%	1.65%
Pacific Islander or Native Hawaiian (NH)	1	8	0.01%	0.07%
Some other race (NH)	22	51	0.20%	0.45%
Two or more races/Multiracial (NH)	112	420	1.00%	3.70%
Hispanic or Latino (any race)	354	637	3.15%	5.61%
Total	11,231	11,354		

=== 2020 census ===
As of the 2020 census, Cocoa Beach had a population of 11,354. The median age was 59.8 years. 9.4% of residents were under the age of 18 and 37.0% of residents were 65 years of age or older. For every 100 females there were 99.2 males, and for every 100 females age 18 and over there were 98.5 males age 18 and over.

100.0% of residents lived in urban areas, while 0.0% lived in rural areas.

There were 6,050 households in Cocoa Beach, of which 12.1% had children under the age of 18 living in them. Of all households, 42.8% were married-couple households, 23.4% were households with a male householder and no spouse or partner present, and 27.2% were households with a female householder and no spouse or partner present. About 38.9% of all households were made up of individuals and 20.6% had someone living alone who was 65 years of age or older.

There were 8,967 housing units, of which 32.5% were vacant. The homeowner vacancy rate was 2.6% and the rental vacancy rate was 20.0%.

According to 2020 ACS 5-year estimates, there were 3,003 families residing in the city.

=== 2020 estimates ===
The ancestry in 2020 (excluding Latino groups), was 19.5% German, 19.4% Irish, 18.1% English, 6.4% Italian, 5.2% Polish, 4.6% French, 2.0% Scottish, 1.1% Norwegian, and 0.1% Sub-saharan African.

In 2020, the median household income was $73,901, with families having $104,449, married couples having $114,468, and non-families having $44,792. 9.8% of the population were in poverty, with 9.8% of people under 18, 12.0% of people between the ages of 18 and 64, and 6.2% of people 65 or older in poverty. The per capita income was $55,754.

=== 2010 census ===
As of the 2010 United States census, there were 11,231 people, 6,052 households, and 3,263 families residing in the city.

=== Language ===
As of 2018, the primary language spoken in Cocoa Beach is English, with 9.8% of the population speaking languages other than English at home.

== Government ==
Cocoa Beach is run by a Commission-Manager government, agreed to by its citizens in 1958. The City Commission acts as the legislative branch of the city government, guided by the provisions of the Charter of the City of Cocoa Beach. The City Commission enacts ordinances and resolutions that the City Manager administers as the appointed executive officer of the city government.

The city owns and runs the Cocoa Beach Country Club, a golf course on the Banana River.

In 2007, the city had a taxable real estate base of $2.09 billion.

In 2011, the city photographed more than 20,000 instances of vehicles running red lights by the use of automatic cameras. A total of 6,595 violations were prosecuted. In 2012, the police force consisted of 36 officers. In 2014, the city grossed $1.1 million for over 9.000 red light violations. Over 24,000 violations were captured on film. All could not be prosecuted for various reasons. The city netted over $249,000. The remainder went for licensing fees to the installing vendor; over half was remitted to the state. Cameras were sited at four locations on state road A1A, including the intersection with state road 520. Intersection crashes dropped from 88 in 2009 to 30 in 2014.

The City Commission is made up of five members, one of whom is the Mayor. Historically, the commissioners were elected at-large to three-year terms but with a successful referendum on the 2010 ballot to hold elections on even-numbered years, the terms were extended to four years.

Following an election, a Vice Mayor is then selected from the commission members at an organizational meeting. The Mayor presides over all meetings and performs duties as delegated by the City Commission. Seats affected by the 2010 referendum included Seat #1, Seat #4 and Seat #5.

=== City Commission ===
- Mayor and Commissioner Keith Capizzi, Seat 1 (Term expires November 2028)
- Commissioner Joshua Jackson, Seat 2 (Term expires November 2028)
- Commissioner Tim Tumulty, Seat 3 (Term expires November 2028)
- Commissioner Skip Williams, Seat 4 (Term expires November 2026)
- Vice Mayor and Commissioner Jeremy Hutcherson, Seat 5 (Term expires November 2026)

=== City Manager ===
The City Manager is appointed by the City Commission and is responsible for the city's day-to-day operations. The city's charter has established a separation of powers and responsibility between the Commission and the Manager; the elected commission establishes policy that the manager and staff carry out. The City Manager conducts day-to-day operations through four city departments: Administrative, Public Safety, Utilities, and Recreation. Charles Billias was the City Manager from 1998 until October 2012. Bob Majka was the City Manager from 2012 until 2015. As of 2023, Robin R. Hayes is the current city manager.

=== Crime Rate ===
In 2016, the crime index for the Cocoa Beach was 14 in 100, where 100 is safest and 0 is most unsafe. Cocoa Beach was safer than 14% of cities in the United States. The crime rate of Cocoa Beach was higher than Florida where chances of becoming a victim 1 in 264, while in Cocoa Beach it is 1 in 183 people. Below is the chart for the crime rate of violent nature in Cocoa Beach. This was a single year and may not represent the municipality as a whole over a broader period of time.

2016 COCOA BEACH VIOLENT CRIMES
POPULATION: 11,761
	MURDER	RAPE	ROBBERY	ASSAULT
Report Total	1	6	11	44
Rate per 1,000	0.09	0.51	0.94	3.74
UNITED STATES VIOLENT CRIMES
POPULATION: 323,127,513
	MURDER	RAPE	ROBBERY	ASSAULT
Report Total	17,250	130,603	332,198	803,007
Rate per 1,000	0.05	0.4	1.03	2.49

== Economy ==
=== Tourism ===
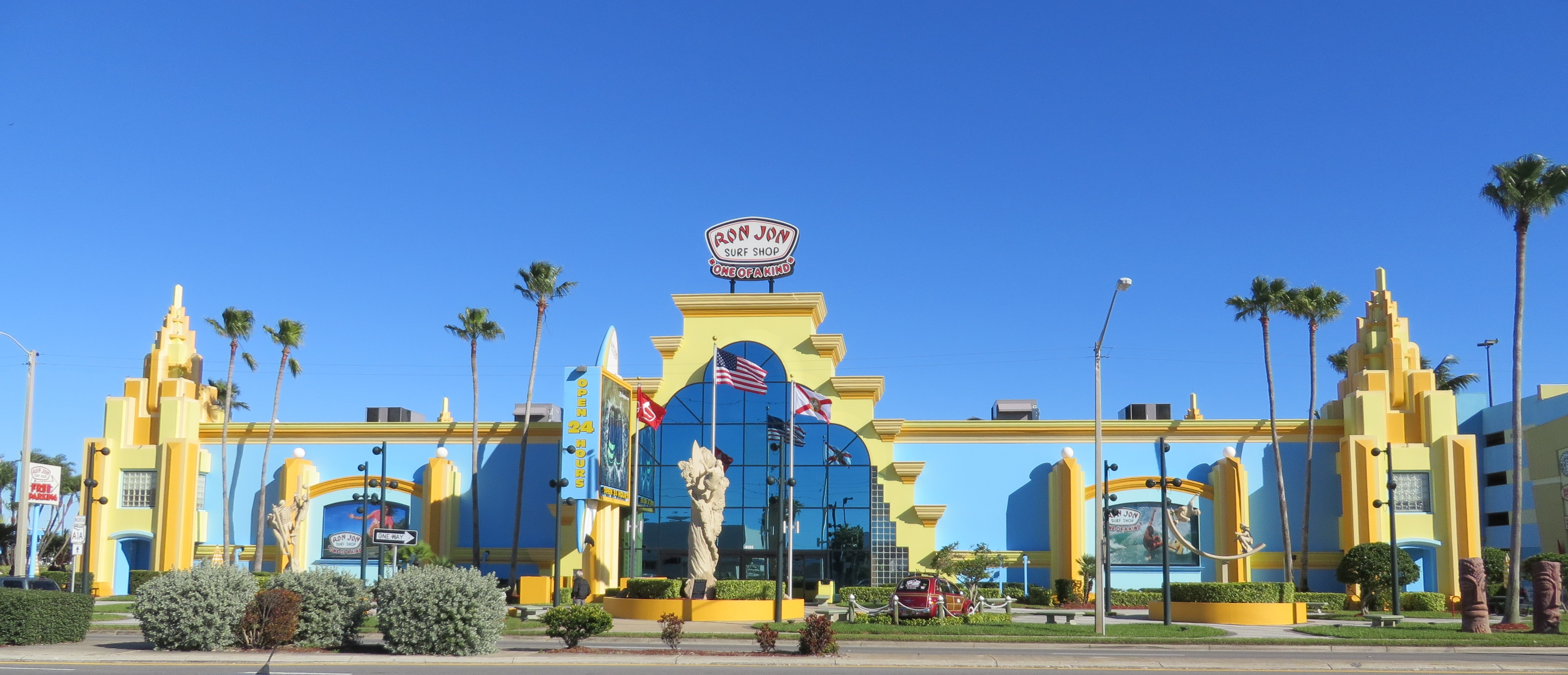
Ron Jon Surf Shop

Ron Jon Surf Shop receives 2 million visitors a year (as of 2006). Cocoa Beach is home to the East Coast Surfing Hall of Fame.

The Cocoa Beach Pier, formerly known as the Cape Canaveral Pier, was built in 1962. An annual Easter Surfing Festival began in 1964. An estimated 100,000 spectators attend annually.

An air show in 2009 drew a crowd estimated at 30,000.

The Ron Jon Easter Surfing Festival drew 50,000 visitors in 2009, while around 10,000 visitors attend the Surfing Santas festival each year at Christmas.

The largest charity surfing festival, National Kidney Foundation Pro-Am Surfing Festival, has been held every Labor Day Weekend in Cocoa Beach since 1985.

In 2015, businesses in the city collected $5.6 million in tourist tax, over half the tourist tax collected in the county and more than any other municipality, $1.4 million.

=== Workforce ===
In 2007, Cocoa Beach's median labor force was 6,344. Of that group, 6,006 were employed and 338 were unemployed, for an unemployment rate of 5.3%.

The median home price in 2007 was $409,000.

=== Health ===
The disability rate for the people under age of 65 is 7.6%. The number of people who do not have insurance policies on the Cocoa beach is 20.8%.

=== Travel time to work ===
As of 2018, mean travel time to the work is 25.4 minutes from home to work.

== Education ==
The city has three public schools:

- Freedom 7 Elementary
- Theodore Roosevelt Elementary
- Cocoa Beach High School

Freedom 7 Elementary school and Cocoa Beach Jr./Sr High School both are certified International Baccalaureate schools. Freedom 7 Elementary has a primary years program, and Cocoa Beach Jr./Sr High has both a middle years program and a diploma program.

96.1% of all residents 25 years or older are high school graduates. 42.3% have a Bachelor's Degree or higher.

== Landmarks ==
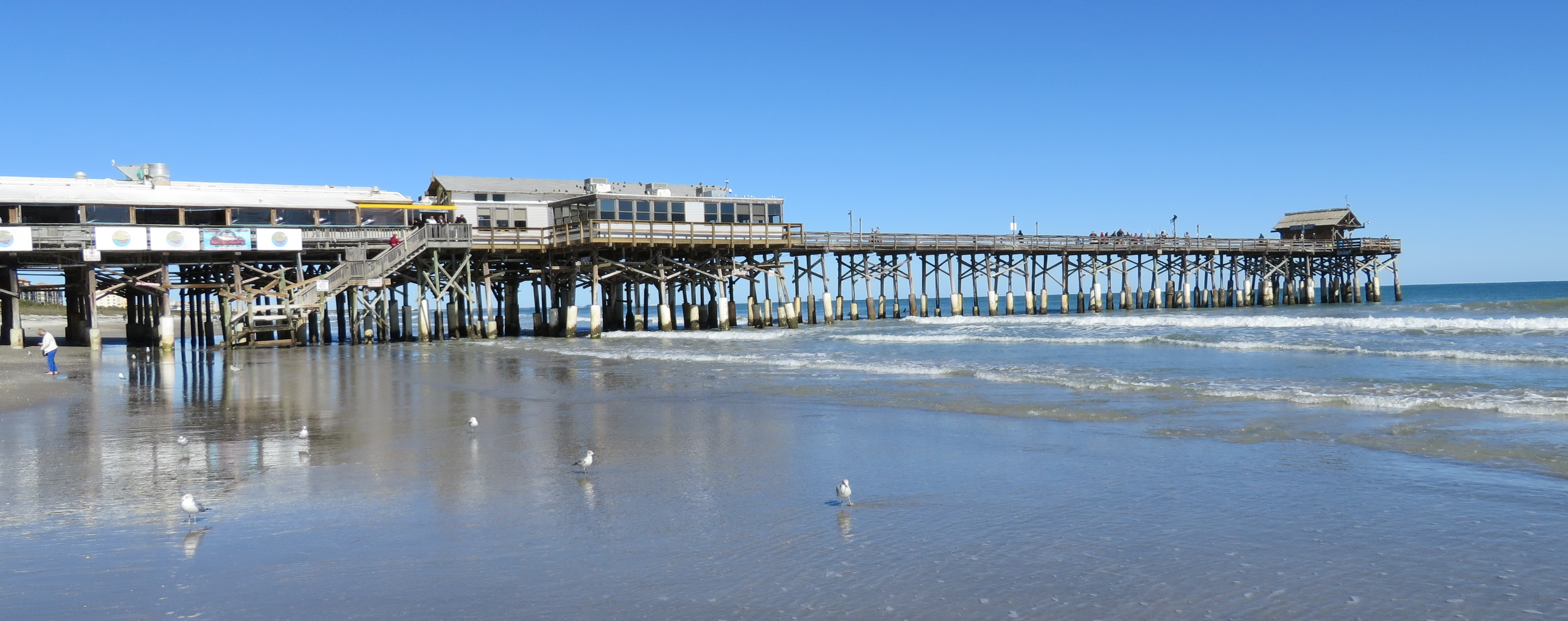
Cocoa Beach Pier

- Cocoa Beach Pier
- Alan Shepard Beachfront Park
- Thousand Islands Conservation Area
- Cocoa Beach Aquatic Center and Pool Complex
- I Dream of Jeannie Lane

=== Former Landmark ===
- Cocoa Beach Glass Bank

== Infrastructure ==
=== Roads ===
The following roads are usually called by their numbers when spoken:

- SR A1A – This is the main road through the city. From north to south, SR A1A enters Cocoa Beach from Cape Canaveral as Atlantic Avenue. After passing the downtown area and resort area, the road splits into a one-way pair of roads, southbound being named Orlando Avenue, with northbound keeping the name Atlantic Avenue. The route continues in this manner until the southbound town limits. Major intersections include SR 520, 4th Street, and Minutemen Causeway.
- SR 520 – This is the main way to access the city from the mainland. It enters the city from the unincorporated community of Merritt Island, and the route terminates at SR A1A. Major intersections include the Cape Canaveral Hospital entrance, Banana River Boulevard, and SR A1A.

It is estimated that there are 2.4 million day trippers to the city annually. While businesses appreciate the tourism, it creates a parking problem for the city. There are 1,780 paved parking spaces and 607 spaces on the streets downtown, near the beach.

=== Public transportation ===
Public transportation in Cocoa Beach, Cape Canaveral, and surrounding Brevard County is provided by Space Coast Area Transit.

=== Utilities ===
The city contracted directly with Florida Power & Light for electricity, paying 10.689 cents per kilowatt hour in 2010.

=== Canals ===
The city has 37 canals, totaling 9 miles (14 km), serving residential homes, plus 17 miles (27 km) of channels. These are maintained by the city.

== Notable people ==
- Kim Adler, professional bowler and USBC Hall of Famer, 5th Street
- Allison Anders, raised in the city. Filmed Things Behind the Sun in the county in 2001
- Emanne Beasha, singer
- Willam Belli, a drag queen, actor, recording artist, and YouTuber raised in the city
- Dana Brown, iconic surfing legend, 16th Street
- Cullen Douglas, television and movie actor, director, screenwriter
- James Folston professional football player for the Oakland Raiders #55
- Ashlyn Harris, professional soccer player
- Jay F. Honeycutt, former director of the Kennedy Space Center
- Zora Neale Hurston, author
- Rick Martel, former professional wrestler
- Bubba McDowell, professional football player with the Houston Oilers #25
- Al Neuharth, CEO of Gannett and columnist. Founder of USA Today
- Kelly Slater, professional surfer, 11-time World Champion
- George Steele, professional wrestler a.k.a. George "The Animal" Steele
- Carrot Top, comedian, actor, was born in the city
- Lori Wilson, Florida state legislator and lawyer
- Melissa Witek, Miss Florida USA 2005 and contestant on NBC's Treasure Hunters
- Nancy Yasecko, filmmaker and videographer

== See also ==
- Harbor Cay condominium collapse
- Space Chase USA (2019 film documentary)
