= Cocoa Beach Glass Bank =

Building in Cocoa Beach, Florida, US

Coordinates: 28.32596°N 80.60954°W

The Glass Bank
- A postcard depicting the Cocoa Beach Glass Bank in its original form.
- Interactive map of the The Glass Bank area
- Alternative names: The Cocoa Beach Glass Bank

General information
- Construction started: 1960
- Completed: 1961
- Inaugurated: 1962
- Renovated: 1983
- Demolished: 2014-2015
- Owner: Glass Bank Condominium Association (lower floors), Frank Wolfe (penthouse)

Technical details
- Floor count: 5

The Cocoa Beach Glass Bank, officially known as The First Federal Savings & Loan Association of Cocoa – Cocoa Beach Branch, was a five-story glass building in Cocoa Beach, Florida. It officially opened in April 1962, and fell into disrepair in the late 1970s after the end of the space race.

== History ==
=== First years ===
When the building opened in April 1962, besides the bank, the top floor had a restaurant called the Sky Room. Guests could enter and watch space launches from nearby Cape Canaveral. However, when the building was finished in 1961, it had a major flaw; there was no elevator to the upper levels, which ultimately led to the Sky Room closing permanently in 1963. The issue was resolved that same year when an express elevator was added to the building. After the addition of the elevator, Ramon's Rainbow Room, a restaurant and a nightclub tenant, opened up at the former Sky Room space. It also hosted astronauts, celebrities, and politicians on special occasions, and often drew crowds. It was known for its cocktails, jazz music, and good food.

=== Downfall ===
In 1970, Ramon's closed its restaurant at the Glass Bank, and then that same year Marby's Rainbow Room opened. But it was proven unpopular that Marby's left the top floor in 1972, and no new tenants took over the top floor.

==== Renovations ====
In 1983, an attorney named Frank Wolfe purchased the top of the building. He then added a windowless penthouse, and converted it into a brutalist style by reinforcing the corners of the building with concrete.

==== Bank closure ====
In the late 1980s, due to the savings and loan crisis, The First Federal Savings & Loan Association of Cocoa was declared insolvent and was immediately closed by regulators, at that point, First Federal was the last original tenant at the Glass Bank, twenty-years after its existence.

==== Later years ====
In the ensuing decades, damage to the lower floors would be sustained by hurricanes, especially Hurricane Frances. This led to the remaining tenants including Space Coast Credit Union, and a gym, to vacate the spaces, leading to the building becoming abandoned. The Glass Bank Condominium Association (GBCA), which owned the entire building sans the penthouse, wanted to restore the building to its original form. Frank Wolfe refused, and as the stalemate dragged on, the city began fining the co-owners $200 a day. In 2013, the GBCA sued Frank Wolfe for money owed to the city and to the condominium for repairs. In response, Frank Wolfe countersued.

To break the legal stalemate, the city urged the GBCA and Wolfe to agree to demolition, in exchange for waiving fines. The GBCA agreed, but Wolfe did not; asking the city to buy the penthouse instead if they wanted it to be torn down. The city refused to purchase it, and moved to demolish the structure regardless of his wishes. In January 2014, the city sought and obtained approval for demolition, which shut down power and water to the penthouse floors. On February 4, 2014, the GBCA prevailed in its lawsuit against Wolfe, with the court ruling in their favor. The next day, Wolfe's appeal of the approval was rejected. That afternoon, Wolfe died of a self-inflicted gunshot wound in front of the Glass Bank.

=== Demolition ===
Wolfe's estate cooperated with the decision to demolish the building and in April 2014, the city was granted final permission to perform it. In November of that year, demolition began with asbestos being removed from the building. On February 2, 2015, the building was demolished.
