= Halifax area =

Region in Florida

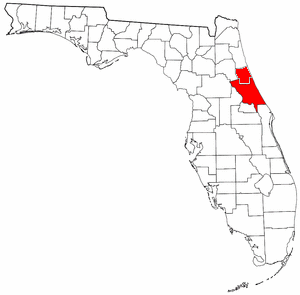
- Location in Florida
- Time zone: UTC-5 (Eastern Standard Time)

The Halifax area or simply Daytona is a region of the U.S. state of Florida, comprising the area around Daytona Beach. It is roughly coextensive with the Daytona Beach metropolitan area and Volusia County. There have been a number of attempts to establish a regional identity for Daytona, including dubbing it the "Surf Coast" and "Fun Coast". The name "Halifax area" refers to the Halifax River, which runs through Daytona Beach and other nearby municipalities.

== History ==
The area around the Halifax River saw continuous settlement in the late 19th century, and gained international fame for its beaches and automobile racing beginning in the early 20th century. However, it was several decades before a popular regional identity for the wider area emerged. Today, the region is usually known as simply "Daytona", or the "Halifax area".

As with several other parts of Florida, there have been several attempts to create a regional identity for the Halifax area. These usually involve the term "Coast", as with the Gold Coast, the Space Coast, and the First Coast. In the 1970s tourism promoters marketed the area as the "Surf Coast". The concept was subsequently adopted by the wider community, appearing in publications of the period and in a 1982 survey of Florida's regions by geographers Ary J. Lamme and Raymond K. Oldakowski. Over time, however, use and recognition of the "Surf Coast" declined. A 2007 follow-up survey by Lamme and Oldakowski found that it had become one of the least known of Florida's regions, being mentioned explicitly by only one respondent, and appearing only infrequently in publications and promotional materials for the area.

In the 1990s promoters initiated a campaign to dub the region the "Fun Coast". This particular branding had previously been attempted for the St. Petersburg area in the 1980s and Fort Lauderdale in 1993. By 1995 promoters pushed to sell Volusia and Flagler Counties together as the "Fun Coast". In 1999, when the Halifax area was preparing to split from area code 904, the Daytona Beach/Halifax Area Chamber of Commerce lobbied to claim the previously unassigned "386", spelling "FUN" on a telephone keypad, as their new code. This measure, supported by various government officials, agencies, and residents, was successful, and area code 386 was created to cover the area around Daytona as well as a non-contiguous part of North Central Florida.

Regardless of these campaigns, "Halifax area" or "Daytona" remain the common way of referring to the region by local organizations.

== See also ==
- First Coast - to the north
- Space Coast - to the south
