= Bryan Norcross =

American TV meteorologist (b.1950)

- Born: November 24, 1950 (age 75)
- Education: Florida State University
- Occupation: Meteorologist

Bryan S. Norcross (born November 24, 1950) is a television meteorologist and hurricane specialist. He currently works for Fox Weather. Norcross previously served as a hurricane specialist for The Weather Channel.

Norcross is also a former chief meteorologist for WTVJ-TV (the NBC owned-and-operated television station in Miami, Florida), where he became well known for his part in that station's coverage of Hurricane Andrew in 1992. Subsequently, he was Director of Meteorology for WFOR-TV, the CBS owned-and-operated television station in Miami, and hurricane analyst for CBS News in New York City.

From 1996 to 2007, Norcross was a regular fixture on CBS's national newscasts providing commentary during hurricane season. In June 2008, he left WFOR and instead focused more time on America's Emergency Network, a private company he formed with business partner Max Mayfield, former director of the National Hurricane Center. A resident of Miami Beach, he has lived in Florida for most of his life.

== Career ==
Norcross's first broadcasting job was as a disc jockey on WTAI, an AM station in Melbourne, Florida working there part-time in 1968 and 1969. During college in Tallahassee, Florida he worked on the air at WTAL-AM and WFSU-FM.

Norcross started in television as an engineer at WFSU-TV in Tallahassee, Florida while in college, moving to WXIA-TV (then WQXI-TV) in Atlanta as a maintenance engineer/technical director after graduation in 1972. At that station he was promoted to acting Production Manager in 1974 before being transferred to Denver television station KBTV (now KUSA) in 1975 as the evening director of the station's newscasts. In 1976 Norcross was assigned to produce (and for over a year direct as well) the 10:00 pm news which became the market's highest rated news program. In 1977, Norcross was promoted and transferred to WLKY-TV in Louisville as News Director. While on a house-hunting trip to Louisville in January 1978, a massive snow storm hit the city. He was the only news person able to get to the television station and went on the air with the help of two overnight engineers, providing the city the only TV coverage of the storm. In 1979 he returned to Florida State University for a masters program.

Upon receiving a Master's Degree in 1980, Norcross became the first weekend weathercaster on CNN when it signed on in June of that year. Later that year he moved to KGO-TV in San Francisco to do the weekend weather and science reports during the week. In 1981, he returned to Atlanta as Executive Producer for Documentaries and Magazines at WTBS, handling many of Ted Turner's pet projects. At the same time he was the weekend meteorologist on WXIA-TV. In 1983, Norcross moved to Miami as weekend meteorologist for then-ABC affiliate WPLG. In 1984, he moved to the 5:30 news where he created a concept called Neighborhood Weather where the weather was done as part of a live feature every day. In 1990, he moved to WTVJ, the NBC-owned station, as Chief Meteorologist where he became known for his coverage of Hurricane Andrew. As Andrew passed just south of Miami in the early morning hours of Monday, August 24, 1992, Norcross's 23-hour marathon broadcast became many viewers' (and radio listeners') only link to the outside world. His television station was the station able to broadcast through the entire hurricane event. During the worst part of the storm, some people called into the station to ask for life-saving advice. Throughout the entire ordeal, Norcross remained calm, steady, and knowledgeable. He joined WFOR as Director of Meteorology in 1996. In 2006, he gave up day-to-day weathercasting responsibilities to concentrate on hurricanes and emergency communications issues.

Norcross worked as a Hurricane Specialist at The Weather Channel from 2010 to 2018. From 2011 to 2013, he also served as Sr. Executive Director of Weather Content and Presentation at The Weather Channel, where he led the winter storm naming initiative in 2012. Norcross returned to WPLG in February 2018. His primary role during his second stint at WPLG was as Hurricane Specialist until March 2022.

On March 14, 2022, Fox Weather hired Norcross as a hurricane specialist and contributor effective immediately.

== Accolades ==
Norcross was named Expert Advisor to the Academic Task Force on Hurricane Catastrophe Insurance by Florida State Treasurer and Insurance Commissioner Bill Nelson, and a member of the Governor's Committee to evaluate state response and recommend changes to the state emergency system by Governor Lawton Chiles.

In appreciation for his work before, during and after Hurricane Andrew, Norcross received the 1993 David Brinkley Award for Excellence in Communication. He was also publicly recognized with designations of Bryan Norcross Days in Miami, Miami Beach, and Ft. Lauderdale, among other cities. In addition, he's the recipient of an Emmy Award from the Suncoast Chapter of the National Academy of Television Arts and Sciences, and led the team that won DuPont and Peabody awards, recognizing WTVJ’s coverage of Hurricane Andrew.

Norcross was named Honorary Chairman of the Board of the South Florida Hurricane Warning museum project in Deerfield Beach. In addition he has recently served on the board of directors of the Wolfsonian Museum on Miami Beach, operated by Florida International University.

== Books ==
Norcross is the author of Hurricane Almanac 2006 - The Essential Guide to Storms Past, Present, and Future and the follow-up edition published in 2007 named Hurricane Almanac with 80 pages of updates and additional material. The book covers hurricane history, science, and includes a large section on hurricane preparedness called "Living Successfully in the Hurricane Zone". In addition, a section called "How I'd Do It Better" is made up of Norcross's comments on and ideas for improving many aspects of the government's system for dealing with the hurricane threat.

In July 2006, a companion website was built, HurricaneAlmanac.com, with Norcross's updates to the book, bonus material, a shopping section for hurricane supplies, and the ability for users to suggest their own updates.

In May 2017, Norcross self-published his memoir on Hurricane Andrew, titled "My Hurricane Andrew Story."

== See also ==
- Hurricane Andrew
