= List of coasts of Florida =

There are many names that can refer to various parts of the coastline of the peninsular US state of Florida. The coast by be divided by contact with bodies of water or beaches but there are many different names to different parts of the state's shoreline.

== Coasts by body of water ==
The peninsular coast of the US state of Florida is formed from contact with three main large bodies of water: the open Atlantic Ocean to the east, the Caribbean Sea to the south, and the Gulf of Mexico to the West (making part of the larger Gulf Coast of the United States). The Southern coast includes the Biscayne Bay, Florida Bay, and Whitewater Bay while the Western coast has Tampa Bay, Waccasassa Bay, Apalachee Bay, and Choctawhatchee Bay.

== Named coasts ==
Some of them are official names while others are unofficial names used by marketers for tourism purposes and may have even fallen into general disuse. Coasts can overlap. The following officially and unofficially named coasts (proceeding roughly clockwise from northeasternmost shore):

- First Coast / Historic Coast
- Surf Coast (1970s local name for Daytona area)
- Space Coast / Mosquito Coast
- Treasure Coast
- Gold Coast
- Florida Keys
- Sun Coast
- Paradise Coast (name for Naples area)
- Lee Island Coast
- Cultural Coast, most notably includes the city of Sarasota
- Nature Coast
- Big Bend Coast
- Forgotten Coast
- Emerald Coast

=== Fun Coast ===
Various localities have tried to claim usage of the term "Fun Coast". In the 1990s promoters initiated a campaign to dub the Halifax area the "Fun Coast". This particular branding had previously been attempted for the St. Petersburg area in the 1980s and Fort Lauderdale in 1993. By 1995 promoters pushed to sell Volusia and Flagler Counties together as the "Fun Coast". In 1999, when the Halifax area was preparing to split from area code 904, the Daytona Beach/Halifax Area Chamber of Commerce lobbied to claim the previously unassigned "386", spelling "FUN" on a telephone keypad, as their new code. This measure, supported by various government officials, agencies, and residents, was successful, and area code 386 was created to cover the area around Daytona as well as a non-contiguous part of North Central Florida.

== See also ==
- Palm Coast, Florida, the name of a city roughly between First Coast and Space Coast
