= South Cocoa Beach, Florida =

Unincorporated community in Florida, U.S.

Coordinates: 28.282°N 80.608°W

South Cocoa Beach is an unincorporated community between Cocoa Beach and Patrick Space Force Base, in Brevard County, Florida, US. Subdivisions include Crescent Beach and Orlando Beach, the latter at the intersection of 35th Street and State Road A1A. South Cocoa Beach is located between the causeways of State Road 520 and State Road 404.

== Surrounding areas ==
- Cocoa Beach
- Indian River
- Atlantic Ocean
- Patrick Space Force Base
