= List of city nicknames in Florida =

This partial list of city nicknames in Florida compiles the aliases, sobriquets and slogans that cities in Florida are known by (or have been known by historically), officially and unofficially, to local people, outsiders or their tourism boards or chambers of commerce. City nicknames can help in establishing a civic identity, helping outsiders recognize a community or attracting people to a community because of its nickname; promote civic pride; and build community unity. Nicknames and slogans that successfully create a new community "ideology or myth" are also believed to have economic value. Their economic value is difficult to measure, but there are anecdotal reports of cities that have achieved substantial economic benefits by "branding" themselves by adopting new slogans.

Some unofficial nicknames are positive, while others are derisive. The unofficial nicknames listed here have been in use for a long time or have gained wide currency.

== Nicknames by city ==
- Apopka – Indoor Foliage Capital of the World
- Aventura – The City of Excellence
- Bartow
  - City of Oaks and Azaleas
  - The City of Oaks
  - The 'Tow
- Belle Glade – Muck City
- Boca Raton – A City for All Seasons
- Boynton Beach – Btown
- Bradenton – The Friendly City
- Brooksville - Crooksville
- Cape Coral
  - Waterfront Wonderland
  - Cape Coma
- Clewiston – America's Sweetest Town
- Coconut Creek – Butterfly Capital of the World
- Coral Gables – The City Beautiful
- Coral Springs – Everything Under the Sun
- Crestview – Hub City
- DeLand – The Athens of Florida
- Deltona – Florida's Bright Spot
- Destin – The World's Luckiest Fishing Village
- Eustis – The City of Bright Tomorrows
- Fernandina Beach – Shark's Tooth Capital of the World
- Fort Lauderdale – Venice of America
- Fort Myers – The City of Palms
- Fort Pierce – The Sunshine City
- Fort Walton Beach
  - Billfish Capital of the World
  - Emerald Coast
- Gainesville
  - Hogtown
  - The Tree City
  - Rainesville
  - Gator Country
- Haines City – The Heart of Florida
- Hialeah – City of Progress
- Jacksonville
  - Jax
  - Where Florida Begins
  - Bold New City of the South
  - River City
  - Murder Capital of Florida
  - Cracksonville
- Key West
  - Conch Republic
  - Southernmost City In The Continental United States
- Lakeland
  - Swan City
- Largo
  - Dime City
- Melbourne – The Harbor City
- Miami
- Navarre
  - Florida's Best Kept Secret
  - Florida's Most Relaxing Place
  - Florida's Playground
- Ocala
  - The Brick City
  - Horse Capital of the World (with Marion County) – the Florida Thoroughbred Breeders' and Owners' Association, obtained the trademark on behalf of Ocala and Marion County in the late 1990s. The title is disputed with Lexington, Kentucky, which also claims to be the "Horse Capital of the World."
- Ocoee – The Center of Good Living
- Okeechobee – Speckled Perch Capital of the World
- Orlando
  - The City Beautiful
  - O-Town
  - Theme Park Capital of the World
- Ormond Beach – Birthplace of Speed
- Panama City Beach – The World's Most Beautiful Beaches
- Pensacola – City of Five Flags
- Plant City
  - Strawberry Capital of the World
  - Winter Strawberry Capital of the World
- Port St. Lucie
  - PSL
  - A City for All Ages
- St. Petersburg
  - Always in Season
  - The Burg
  - Sunshine City
  - St. Pete
- Sarasota – We Live Where You Vacation
- Sebring – City on the Circle
- Spring Hill - Spring Hell
- Stuart – Sailfish Capital of the World
- Tallahassee
  - Tally
  - Tallanasty
- Tampa
  - The Big Guava
  - Cigar City
  - Lightning Capital of the World
  - Champa Bay, after multiple local pro sports franchises won championships in 2020 and 2021
- Tarpon Springs – Sponge Capital of the World
- Venice – Shark Tooth Capital of the World
- West Palm Beach – Orchid City

== See also ==
- List of city nicknames in the United States
- List of cities in Florida
- List of coasts of Florida
