= Titletown =

Titletown, Titletown USA, and variants may refer to:

== Towns given the nickname for success in sports ==
- Boston, Massachusetts
- Green Bay, Wisconsin
- Maryville, Missouri
- Valdosta, Georgia

== Other ==
- Titletown District, shopping and entertainment district next to Lambeau Field in Green Bay, Wisconsin
- Titletown High, a Netflix reality show about the Valdosta High School football team's 2020 season in Valdosta, Georgia
- "TitleTown USA", a 2008 SportsCenter segment on the ESPN cable television network

== See also ==
- City of Champions (disambiguation)
