= Surfing Santas =

Annual festival in Cocoa Beach, Florida

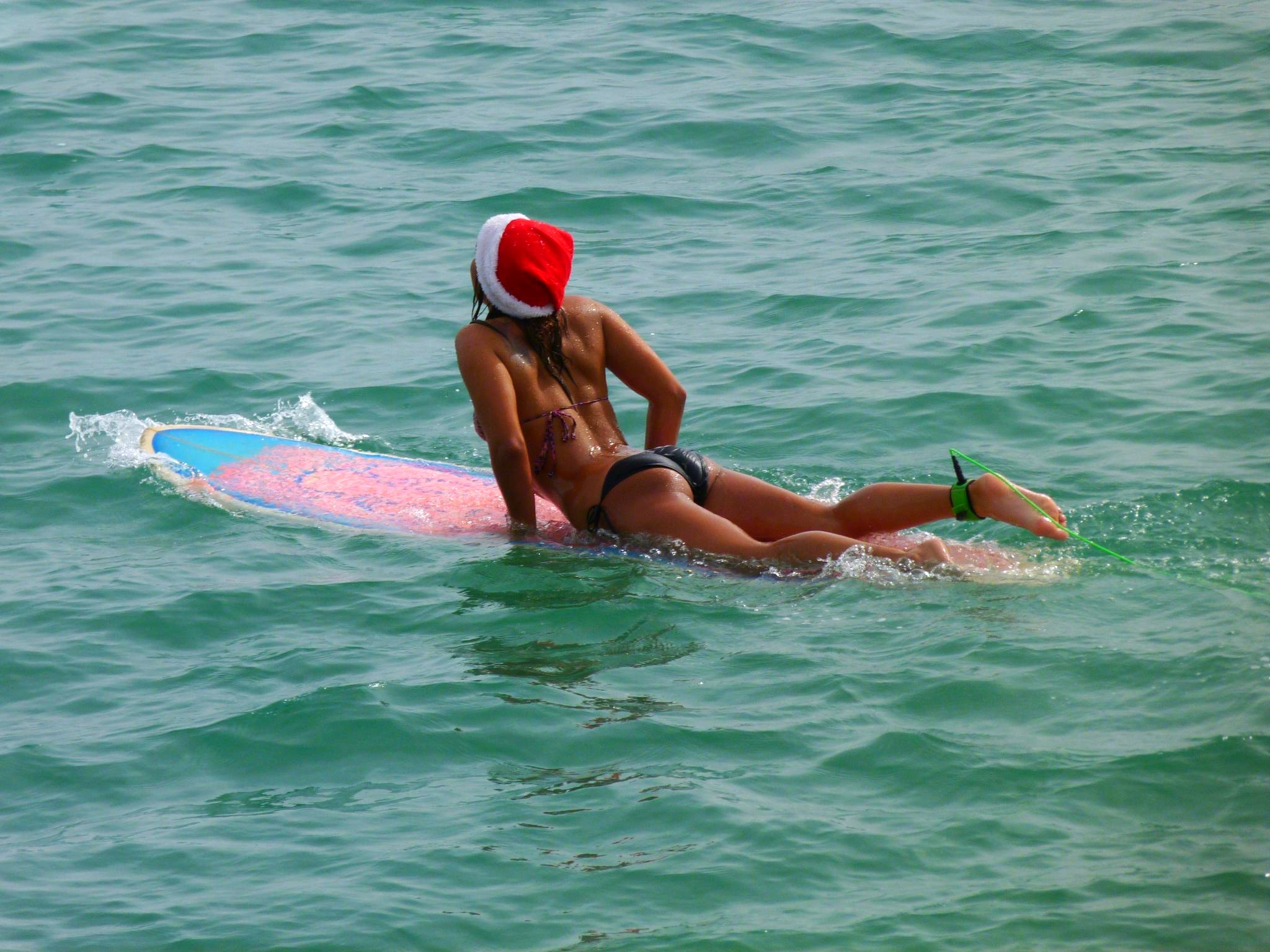
- A surfer in 2012
- Date: December 24, 2009 – present
- Time: 8 a.m. – noon (EST)
- Venue: Minutemen Causeway
- Location: Cocoa Beach, Florida, U.S.
- Theme: Christmas
- Organized by: Trosset family Florida Surf Museum
- Website: surfingsantas.org

Surfing Santas is an annual festival held in Cocoa Beach, Florida, on Christmas Eve. Participants dress up as Santa Claus and surf, while thousands of spectators watch from the beach, which hosts a costume competition and live music.

== Event ==
Surfing Santas is a free beach party held between 8 a.m. and noon on Christmas Eve at the Minutemen Causeway area of Cocoa Beach, Florida; the Santas surf from 10 a.m.

It attracts hundreds of surfers, traditionally dressed as Santa Claus but some also wearing elf, reindeer, and Grinch costumes, as well as thousands of spectators every year. Local food stalls open on the beach for the event. A live band plays music at the event, which also features a costume competition and Hawaiian dancers. Festival regulars include "Mr. and Mrs. Surfing Santa" – Clifford "Peanut" and Terrie Keuhner. The festival collects charity donations for the Florida Surf Museum and Grind For Life. The festivals have raised over $90,000 for local charities. As Cocoa Beach is on the Space Coast, themed shirts depicting Santa in space are sold at the event.

== History ==
Cocoa Beach has a prominent surfing history, and is considered a capital of the activity. Surfing Santas began in 2009, started by George Trosset and his family, and since 2014 the event has been organized along with the Florida Surf Museum. Trosset grew up in Rockledge, Florida, and was around surfing Santa iconography from his childhood. He moved to Cocoa Beach to take over his grandfather's boat shop in 1979, selling the business in 1998. Inspired by a Honda commercial showing surfers driving to the beach on Christmas and surfing while wearing Santa hats and white beards, Trosset decided to expand on this and make it a Christmas tradition. His wife made him a Santa costume and he went out surfing on Christmas Eve 2009 with his children; Florida Today photographer Rik Jesse was at the beach, and published photographs he took of Trosset in the Christmas Day paper. As he intended, Trosset continued his tradition, inviting along friends and drawing crowds of similar-minded people. The surfing Santas all convened near Trosset's beach house, but grew too numerous in 2013. Cocoa Beach city council then approved organizing the event downtown.

In 2018, around 10,000 people attended, 75% of which spent more than one day for their visit, creating Christmas tourism in the area. Beach Grit suggested that Surfing Santas had become Cocoa Beach's biggest claim to fame, overtaking Kelly Slater. Despite the COVID-19 pandemic, the event continued in 2021; it had been held virtually in 2020, though several hundred people still went to the beach to surf as Santa without the festival.

== See also ==
- Space Coast Office of Tourism
