= WHKR =

- Rockledge, Florida; United States
- Broadcast area: Space Coast (Melbourne-Titusville-Cocoa, Florida)
- Frequency: 102.7 MHz
- Branding: 102.7 The Hitkicker

Programming
- Format: Country
- Affiliations: Westwood One

Ownership
- Owner: Cumulus Media; (Cumulus Licensing LLC)
- Sister stations: WAOA-FM; WROK-FM

History
- First air date: 1989
- Call sign meaning: "Hitkicker"

Technical information
- Licensing authority: FCC
- Facility ID: 57628
- Class: C2
- ERP: 50,000 watts
- HAAT: 132 meters (433 ft)

Links
- Public license information: Public file; LMS
- Webcast: Listen live
- Website: www.thehitkicker.com

WHKR (102.7 FM, "The Hitkicker") is a commercial radio station, licensed to Rockledge, Florida, and serving the Space Coast. It is owned by Cumulus Media and broadcasts a country music radio format.

WHKR has an effective radiated power (ERP) of 50,000 watts. The transmitter is off Parrish Road in Cocoa West (28°21′00″N 80°46′29″W).

== History ==
The station first signed on in 1989.

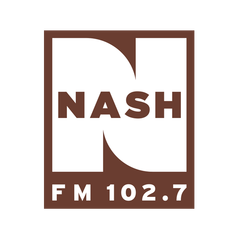
Logo as "Nash FM 102.7"

Previously known as "WHKR 102.7 The Hitkicker", on July 3, 2013, at 3pm, after playing "Parking Lot Party" by Lee Brice, WHKR aired a brief stunt sequence along with the top-of-the-hour station identification. It then joined Cumulus's nationally growing country brand as "Nash FM 102.7 Melbourne". The first song on "Nash" was Randy Houser's How Country Feels. It was the first song on all new Nash FM stations up to that point.

On October 5, 2020, WHKR returned to its original branding as "102.7 The Hitkicker."
