= List of city nicknames in California =

This partial list of city nicknames in California compiles the aliases, sobriquets, mottos and slogans that cities in California are known by (or have been known by historically), officially and unofficially, to locals, outsiders or their tourism boards or chambers of commerce. City nicknames can help in establishing a civic identity, helping outsiders recognize a community or attracting people to a community because of its nickname; promote civic pride; and build community unity. Nicknames and slogans that successfully create a new community "ideology or myth" are also believed to have economic value. Their economic value is difficult to measure, but there are anecdotal reports of cities that have achieved substantial economic benefits by "branding" themselves by adopting new slogans.

Some unofficial nicknames are positive, while others are derisive. The unofficial nicknames listed here have been in use for a long time or have gained wide currency.

== Nicknames by city ==
=== A ===
- Alameda – The Island City
- Anaheim
  - Duck Capital of the World (after the Anaheim Ducks)
  - Ducktown
  - The Heart of the City
  - AnaCrime
- Antioch – Gateway to the Delta
- Arcadia – Community of Homes
- Azusa – "Everything from A to Z in the U.S.A."
- Auburn – Endurance Capital of The World

=== B ===
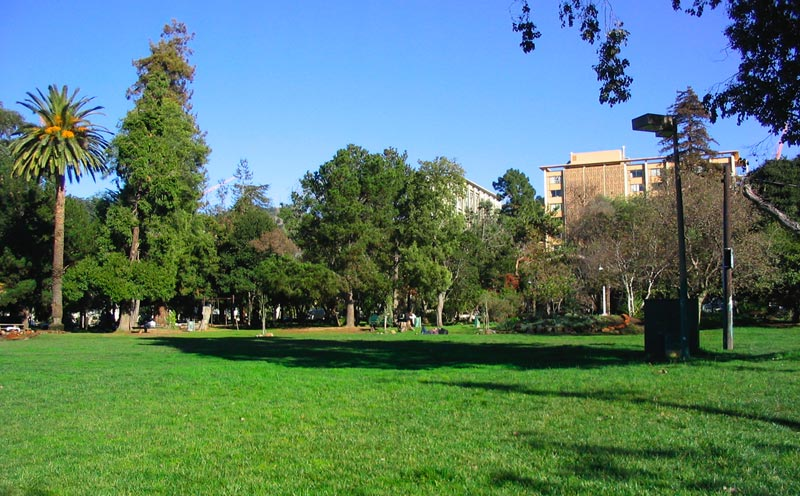
People's Park in Berkeley was a center of 1960s counterculture activity remembered in the sobriquet "The People's Republic of Berkeley."

- Bakersfield
  - California's Country Music Capital
  - Nashville West
  - Little Oklahoma
- Berkeley
  - Berzerkeley
  - The People's Republic of Berkeley
  - Athens of the West
- Bishop – Mule Packer Capital of the World
- Blythe – Friendliest City In The West
- Buena Park – Center of the Southland
- Burbank – Media Capital of the World

=== C ===
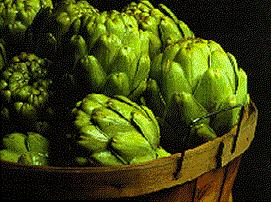
Castroville's nickname celebrates its status as a producer of artichokes.

- Campbell – The Orchard City
- Carlsbad – Village by the sea
- Castroville – Artichoke Center of the World
- Chatsworth – San Pornando
- Chico
  - City of Roses
  - City of Trees
  - Almond Capital of the World
  - Where Everything Grows
- Claremont - City of Tree’s & PHD’s
- Clovis – Gateway to the Sierra
- Coachella
  - City of Eternal Sunshine
  - Gateway to the Salton Sea
- Colma (founded as a necropolis in 1924)
  - The City of the Silent
- Compton – The Hub City
- Corning – Olive City
- Corona – The Circle City
- Coronado – The Crown City
- Corte Madera – The Twin City (with Larkspur)
- Costa Mesa
  - Costa Mexico
  - Goat Hill
  - The City of the Arts
- Culver City – Heart of Screenland

=== D ===
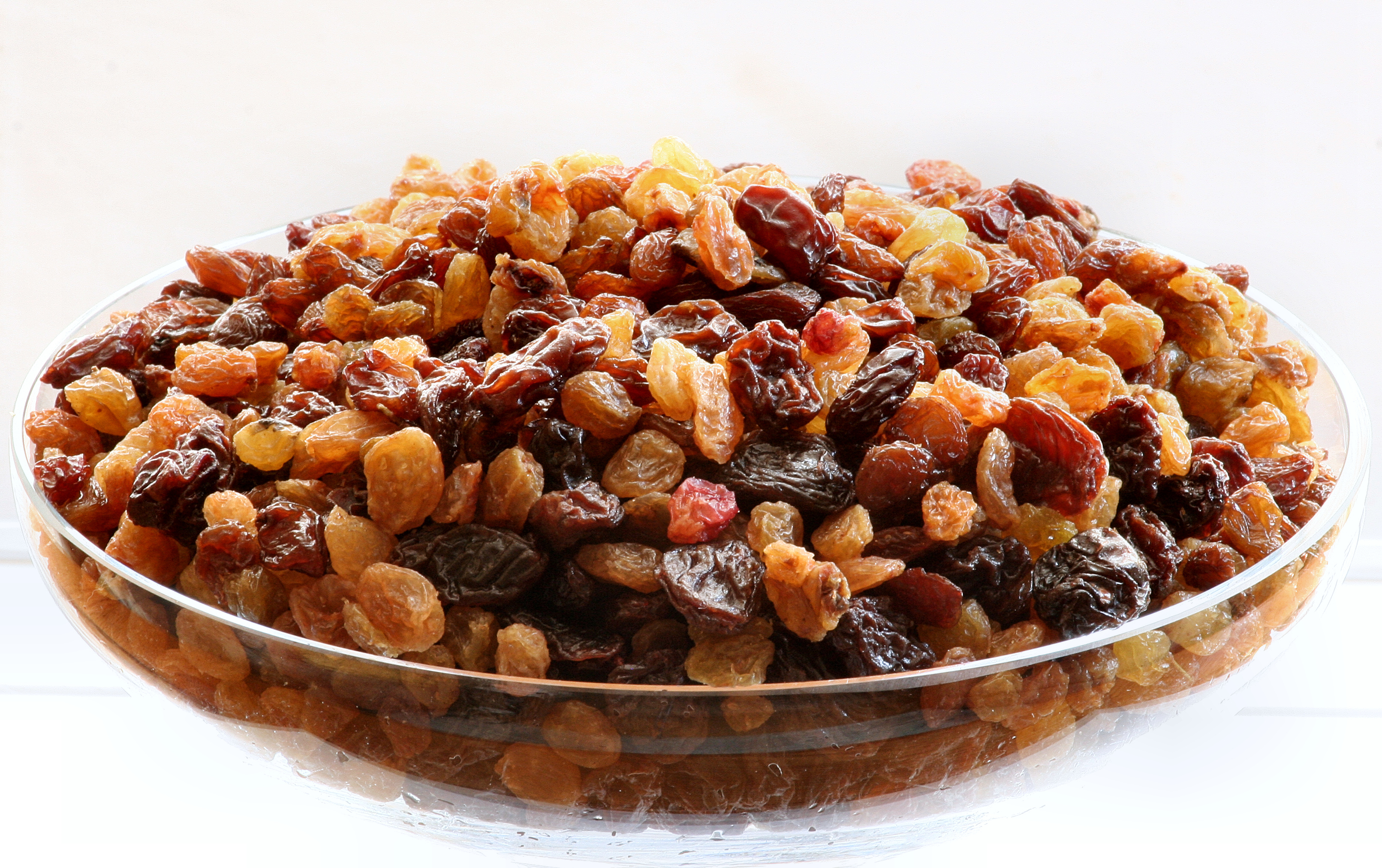
Dinuba, Fallbrook, and Selma have nicknames that celebrate the production of raisins.

- Daly City
  - Gateway To The Peninsula
  - Little Manila
- Davis
  - Bicycle Capital of the World
  - People's Republic of Davis
- Del Mar – Where the turf meets the surf
- Dinuba – Raisinland, USA

=== E ===
- Emeryville
  - Rotten City
  - Klinkerville

=== F ===
- Fallbrook
  - Avocado Capital of the World
  - Raisin Capital of the World
  - City of Youth and Ambition
- Forestville – Poison Oak Capital of the World
- Fontana
  - Fontucky
- Fountain Valley
  - A nice place to live
  - Gospel Swamps
- Fresno
  - The Big Raisin
  - FresYes

=== G ===
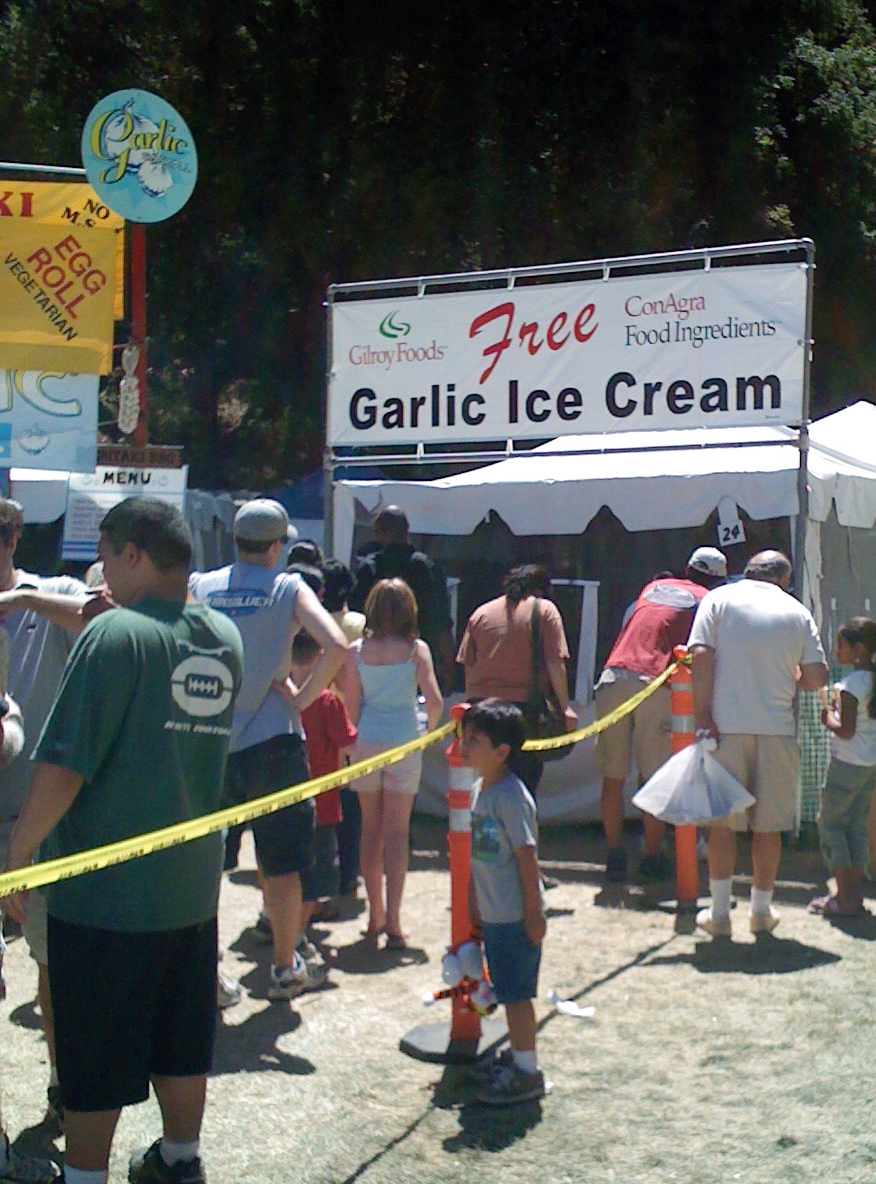
Garlic ice cream is given away at the annual Garlic Festival in Gilroy, nicknamed Garlic Capital of the World.

- Garden Grove
  - Big Strawberry
  - Garbage Grove
- Gilroy – Garlic Capital of the World
- Glendale – The Jewel City
- Glendora – The Pride of the Foothills
- Goleta – The Good Land
- Greenfield – Broccoli Capital of the World
- Gridley – Kiwi Fruit Capital of the World

=== H ===
- Half Moon Bay – Pumpkin Capital
- Hawthorne – City of Good Neighbors
- Hayward
  - Heart of the Bay
  - The Haystack
- Hercules – The Dynamic City on the Bay
- Holtville – The Carrot Capital of the World
- Huntington Beach
  - Surf City, USA
  - Scumington Beach
  - California’s Redneck Riviera

=== I ===
- Indio
  - City of Festivals
  - Date Capital of the World
- Inglewood
  - The City of Champions
  - Inglewatts
- Irwindale
  - Jardín de Rocas
- Isleton
  - Asparagus Capital of the World

=== K ===
- Koreatown, Los Angeles, CA
  - K-Town
  - Crazy Town

=== L ===
- La Crescenta-Montrose – The Balcony of Southern California
- La Habra – Guadalahabra
- La Mesa
  - Jewel of the Hills
- Larkspur – The Twin City (with Corte Madera)
- Linden – Cherry Capital of the World
- Livingston – Sweet Potato Capitol of the World
- Lodi
  - Tokay Grape Capital of the World
  - Zinfandel Capital of the World
- Lompoc – Flower Seed Capital of the World
- Long Beach
  - LBC – popular within the hip-hop community
  - The International City
  - Iowa by the Sea (historical nickname)
- Los Angeles
  - Entertainment Capital of the World
  - L.A.
  - El Lay
  - The Angels (literal Spanish translation)
  - Angeltown
  - The Big Orange
  - City of Angels – based partially on the literal translation of the city's original historical full name from the Spanish language -- "The City of Our Lady the Queen of the Angels".
  - City of Flowers and Sunshine
  - La-La Land
  - Shaky Town
  - Tinseltown (specifically applies to Hollywood)
  - City of Champions (used in 2020 after the Lakers and Dodgers championships just 16 days apart)
  - Tehrangeles or little Persia

=== M ===
- Manteca – Lard City
- Marysville – Gateway to the Gold Fields
- McCloud – Blackberry Capital of the World
- McKinleyville – Oklahoma By The Sea
- Mendota – Cantaloupe Center of the World
- Merced
  - Gateway to Yosemite
  - The Fountain City
- Milpitas – Crossroads of Silicon Valley
- Modesto
  - Water, Wealth, Contentment, Health
  - Motown
- Monterey – The Cradle of History

=== N ===
- Needles – Weedles
- Norco – Horse Town USA
- Norwalk – The Keystone City
- Novato - Slowvato

=== O ===
- Oakdale – Cowboy Capital of the World
- Oakland
  - Bright Side of the Bay
  - Athens of the Pacific (historical)
  - Detroit of the West (historical)
  - Oaktown
  - O-Town
  - The Town
  - Bump City (historical)
  - City of Dope
- Ojai – Shangri La
- Oildale
  - Little Oklahoma
  - Okiedale
- Oxnard
  - Lima Bean Capital of the World
  - Strawberry Capital of the World

=== P ===
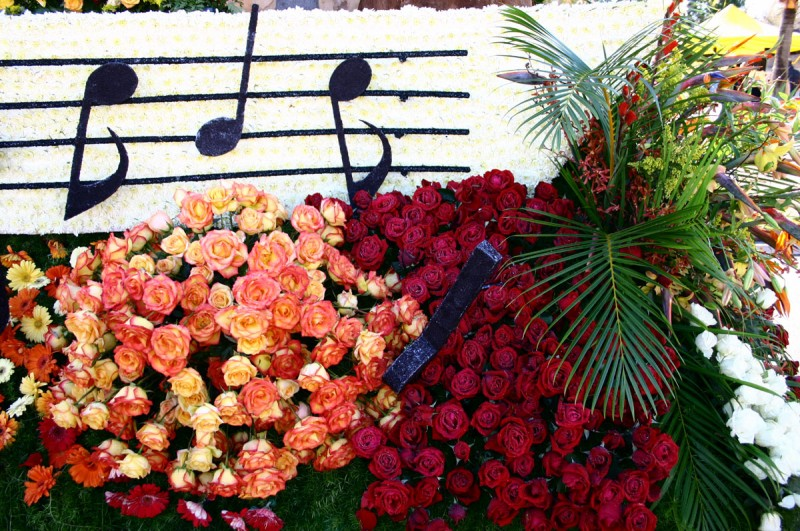
Close-up view of one of the flower-bedecked floats in the annual Tournament of Roses Parade in Pasadena, which calls itself the City of Roses.

- Pacific Grove
  - America's Last Hometown
  - Butterfly Town, U.S.A.
- Pacifica – Fog Capital of California
- Palm Springs – Golf Capital of the World
- Pasadena
  - City of Roses
  - Crown City
- Paso Robles
  - The Pass of the Oaks
- Pearsonville – Hubcap Capital of the World
- Perris
  - Railway Capital of the World
  - Skydiving Capital of America
- Pismo Beach - Okie Beach
- Placerville – Old Hangtown
- Poway – The City In The Country

=== R ===
- Redwood City
  - Climate Best By Government Test
  - Deadwood City
- Reedley – The World's Fruit Basket
- Richmond
  - City of Pride and Purpose
  - The Rich
- Ripon – City of Almonds
- Riverside
  - City of Arts and Innovation
  - City of Trees

=== S ===
- Sacramento
  - Almond Capital of the World
  - Big Tomato
  - Camellia City
  - City of Trees
  - River City
  - Sacratomato
  - Sactown
  - Cannibal City
- Salinas
  - Lettuce Capital of the World
  - The Salad Bowl of the World
- San Bernardino – San Berdoo
- San Carlos – City of Good Living
- San Diego
  - America's Finest City
  - Biotech Beach
  - Birthplace of California
  - City in Motion
  - Plymouth of the West
  - Silicon Beach
  - Sun Diego
  - Wireless Capital of the World
  - Daygo
  - Ohio By The Sea
- San Francisco
  - Baghdad by the Bay
  - Bip City
  - The Paris of the West
  - The City
  - The City by the Bay
  - The City That Knows How (archaic)
  - Everybody's Favorite City
  - Fog City
  - Frisco (locally disparaged)
  - The Exposition City (archaic)
  - The Ideal Convention City (archaic)
  - The Golden Gate City
  - San Fran (locally disparaged)
- San Jose
  - Man Jose
  - The Capital of Silicon Valley
  - San Jo (pronounced SAN HO)
  - Teal Town
  - Fin City
  - Tan Jose
  - The Garden City
  - Richest City in the USA
- San Leandro – The 'Dro
- San Luis Obispo
  - S.L.O. (as in, Experience the SLO Life)
  - Happiest City in America
- San Pablo
  - City of New Directions
  - Where?
- San Quentin – Bastille by the Bay
- Sanger – Christmas Tree City
- Santa Ana – The Golden City
- Santa Barbara – The American Riviera
- Santa Catalina Island – The Island of Romance
- Santa Cruz – (The real) Surf City, USA
- Santa Monica
  - Dogtown
  - Home of the Homeless
  - People's Republic of Santa Monica
  - Soviet Monica
- Santa Paula – Citrus Capital of the World
- Selma – Raisin Capital of the World
- Smith River – Lily Growing Capital of the World

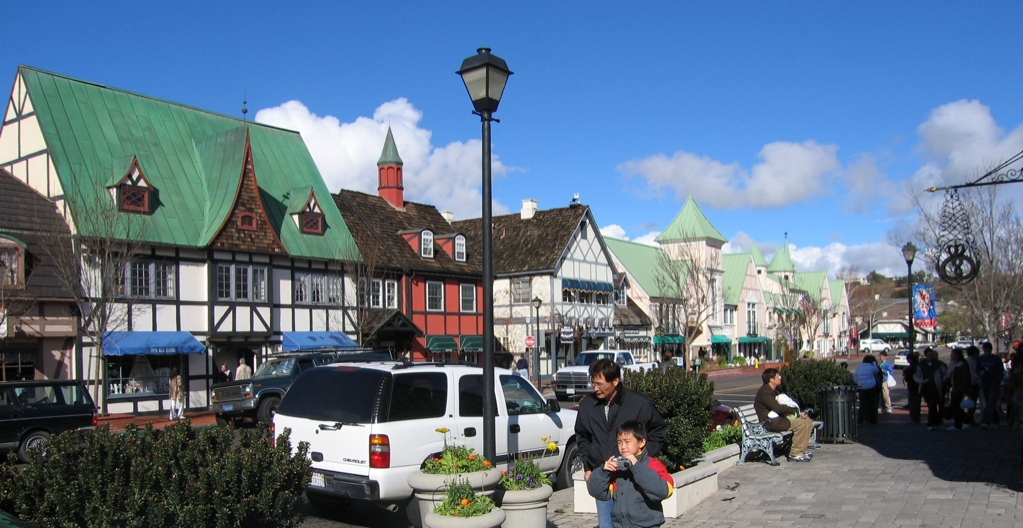
Solvang's architecture reflects the Danish heritage celebrated by its nickname, Danish capital of America.

- Solvang – Danish capital of America
- South San Francisco – The Industrial City, South City
- Stockton
  - Asparagus Capital of the World
  - Tuleburg
  - Gas City
  - Mudville
- Sunnyvale – The Heart of Silicon Valley

=== T ===
- Tulelake
  - Horseradish Capital of the World
- Tustin
  - City of Trees

=== V ===
- Vacaville – Cowtown
- Valencia – Awesometown
- Vallejo – Valley Joe
- Ventura – Poinsettia City (formerly Palm City)
- Visalia
  - Gateway to the Sequoias
  - Jewel of the Valley
  - Tree City

=== W ===
- Wasco – Rose Growing Capital of the World
- Watsonville – Strawberry Capital of the World
- Willits
  - Gateway to the Redwoods
  - Heart of Mendocino County
  - Solar Energy Capital of the World
- Willow Creek – Bigfoot Capital of the World

=== Y ===
- Yorba Linda – Land of Gracious Living
- Yuba City – Prune Capital

== See also ==
- List of city nicknames in the United States
- List of cities in California
