= Space Coast Junior/Senior High School =

School in Brevard County, Florida, United States

Location
- Port St. John, Florida, Florida; United States; 28.47678°N 80.82736°W

Information
- Type: coed
- Principal: Dr. Jannette Connor
- Teaching staff: 80.00 (FTE)
- Grades: 7-12
- Enrollment: 1,534 (2022–23)
- Student to teacher ratio: 19.18
- Color
- Mascot: Viper
- Rival: Titusville High School
- Website: Website

Space Coast Junior/Senior High School is located in Brevard County, Florida, in the community of Port St. John, Florida, United States. It is part of the Brevard County School District. The school name comes from its location, on the Space Coast. The high school graduated its first class in 2006. Dual enrollment is also offered, which allows students to take college classes at Eastern Florida State College to earn college credit; some of these students receive their associate degree at the same time as their high school diploma.

In 1994 the school opened as a middle school and later became a Jr/Sr high in 2001. In 2014, it contained 320,474 square feet (29,773.0 m^{2}).

The campus shares the same design as Central Middle School, a middle school in West Melbourne, Florida.

== JROTC and Academies/Courses ==
The school currently offers a multitude of Courses that aid in their mission to get students ready for College, Career, or the Military:

- SFJOTC - Space Force JROTC
- Drafting - Offers industry certifications and other programs such as Autodesk's Autocad, Inventor, Revit, & Fusion 360.
- Engineering - Offers real working experience, teaches students to work in teams (such as for NASA Hunch), offers industry certifications for Dassault's Solidworks Program.
- TV Production: Teaches students how to use Adobe: Premiere Pro, After Effects & Media Encoder, and gives them the opportunity to certify in those programs.
- ATEPS - A program focused on students interested in teaching, as well as other public-service-related careers.
