= Space Chase USA =

2019 documentary

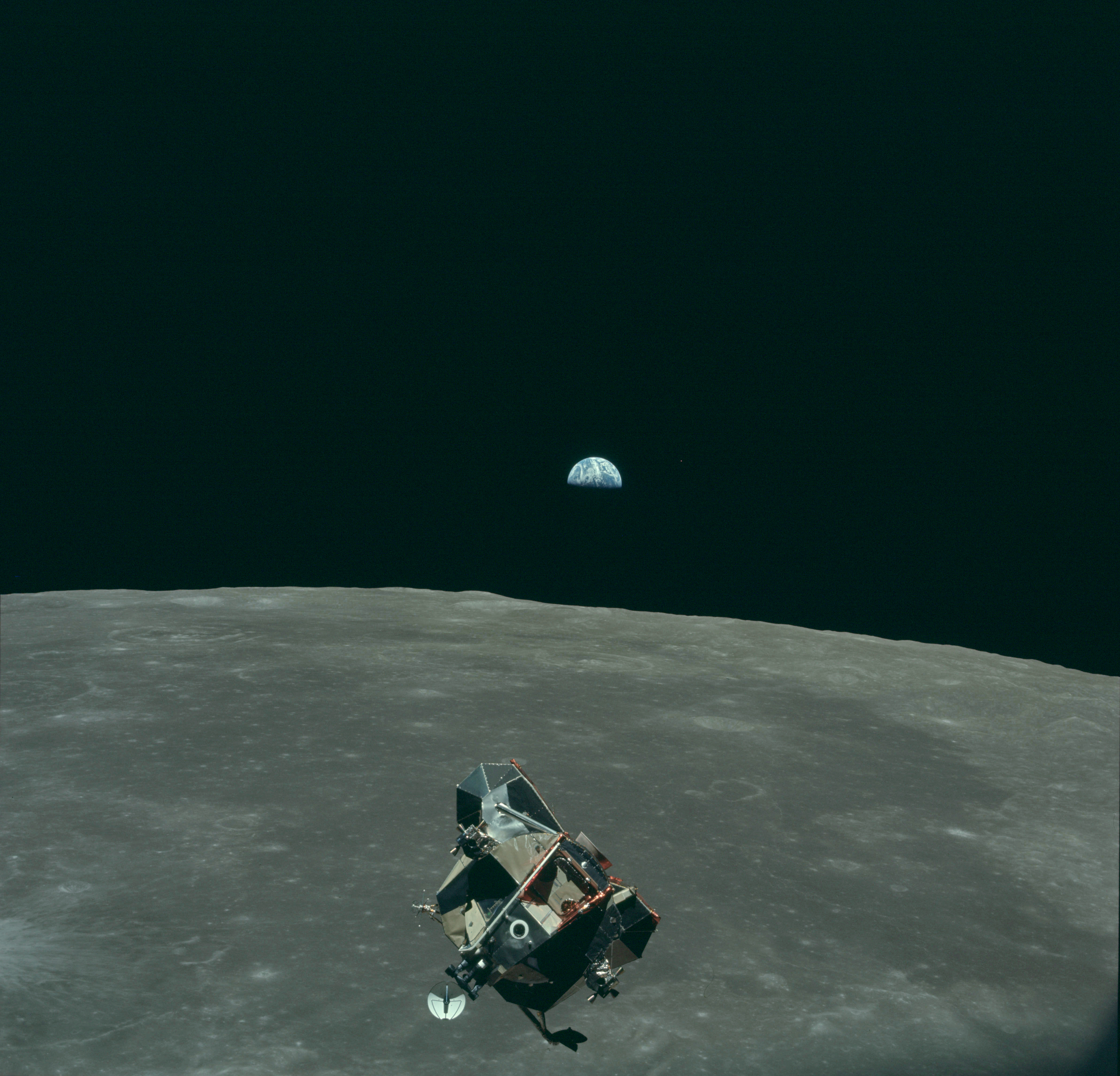
- View of the Earth, the Moon and the Apollo Lunar Module.
- Genre: Documentary film
- Directed by: Adam N. White
- Theme music composer: Kevin Hines (sound)
- Country of origin: United States
- Original language: English
- No. of episodes: 1

Production
- Producers: Duilio Mariola, Adam N. White, Kara Martinelli White
- Cinematography: Adam N. White
- Running time: 1 h (60 min)
- Production company: Hemlock Films

Original release
- Network: PBS
- Release: July 1, 2019

Space Chase USA (also known as Space Chase U.S.A. (2019), Spacetown USA, and Spacetown U.S.A.) is a 2019 American PBS documentary television film that was released on July 1, 2019. The documentary film examines the Apollo human spaceflight program, one of the greatest ventures of humankind, and its effects on Cocoa Beach, a very small Florida town, during the 1950s and the 1960s. The history of the area is especially notable due to the collective memories of its citizens. The many launch experiences at the beach were closely witnessed by members of the community. These members helped build the U.S. space program, and the influence of the nascent space program on community members can still be seen today. The film documentary features accounts by community residents, archival footage and home movies.

== Participants ==
The documentary film includes the following participants (alphabetized by last name):

- Lee Barnhart
- Walter Cunningham
- Bonnie King
- Jerry L. Ross
- Lee Solid
- Jennifer Sugarman
- Roy Tharpe
- Al Worden

== See also ==
- Earth phase
