= WROK-FM =

- Sebastian, Florida; United States
- Broadcast area: Space Coast; Treasure Coast
- Frequency: 95.9 MHz
- Branding: 95.9 The Rocket

Programming
- Format: Classic rock

Ownership
- Owner: Cumulus Media; (Cumulus Licensing LLC)
- Sister stations: WAOA-FM; WHKR

History
- First air date: September 20, 2001
- Former call signs: WBKM (1999–2001); WINT (2001–2003); WSJZ-FM (2003–2016)
- Call sign meaning: "Rock"

Technical information
- Licensing authority: FCC
- Facility ID: 59536
- Class: C3
- ERP: 25,000 watts
- HAAT: 88 meters (289 ft)
- Transmitter coordinates: 27.8895°N 80.5573°W

Links
- Public license information: Public file; LMS
- Webcast: Listen live (via iHeartRadio)
- Website: www.959therocket.com

WROK-FM (95.9 MHz, "The Rocket") is a commercial FM radio station licensed to Sebastian, Florida, serving the Space Coast and Treasure Coast areas. The station is owned by Cumulus Media and airs a classic rock radio format.

WROK-FM has its studios and offices on West Hibiscus Blvd in Melbourne, its transmitter is off Micco Road near Sebastian.

== History ==
The station originally signed on under the call sign WINT on September 20, 2001, and branded itself 95.9 The Point. At the time, the station featured a big band and adult standards format. In 2003, WINT changed its call sign to WSJZ, to reflect its new smooth jazz format, and became known as Smooth Jazz 95.9. On April 1, 2004, the station changed to a classic and alternative rock format, calling itself as Pirate 95.9. On September 3, 2009, WSJZ-FM became the new ESPN Radio station for the Space Coast, featuring a sports radio format, and rebranding itself as ESPN 95.9. Before then, the Space Coast's ESPN Radio affiliate was sister station WINT (later WLZR).

Logo as 95 Rock (2015-2018)

On April 1, 2015, at 6 pm, WSJZ changed its format from sports to active rock, branded as "95 Rock". On February 1, 2016, the station dropped the active rock format for classic rock. On May 31, 2016, WSJZ changed its call letters to WROK-FM. On June 11, 2018, WROK-FM rebranded as "95.9 The Rocket".
