= Port St. John, Florida =

- Census-designated place
- Location in Brevard County and the state of Florida
- Coordinates: 28°28′33″N 80°48′38″W
- Country: United States
- State: Florida
- County: Brevard

Area
  - Total: 9.32 sq mi (24.14 km^{2})
  - Land: 9.32 sq mi (24.14 km^{2})
  - Water: 0 sq mi (0.00 km^{2})
- Elevation: 33 ft (10 m)

Population (2020)
  - Total: 23,474
  - Density: 2,518.3/sq mi (972.34/km^{2})
- Time zone: UTC-5 (Eastern (EST))
  - Summer (DST): UTC-4 (EDT)
- ZIP code: 32927
- Area code: 321
- FIPS code: 12-58700
- GNIS feature ID: 2403439

Port St. John is a census-designated place located between Titusville and Cocoa in Brevard County, Florida. The population was 23,474 at the 2020 United States census, up from 12,267 at the 2010 United States census. It is part of the Palm Bay–Melbourne–Titusville, Florida Metropolitan Statistical Area.

== Geography ==
According to the United States Census Bureau, the CDP has a total area of 3.8 square miles (9.8 km^{2}), all of it land.

== History ==
In 2002, a group of five Port St. John residents formed "Port St. John For Tomorrow" (PSJ4T) and tried to incorporate the Port St. John area. Included in PSJ4T's incorporation plans were five separate communities: Delespine, Williams Point, Hardeeville, Frontenac and a part of Sharpes. PSJ4T had not informed these five communities. When the five communities did find out, they expressed disinterest in being included in the incorporation effort. A feasibility study was requested by PSJ4T members. Voters approved the study. The study was funded by Brevard County and performed by the University of Central Florida. The five reviewing committees in Tallahassee said the study was "deeply flawed.". The county allowed the residents of Port St. John and the five communities to vote on becoming a city. Howard Futch and Randy Ball (CS/HB 1071) sponsored the bills in the Senate and House. The incorporation issue was defeated in November 2002, 73% to 27%, including most of the people in the five communities. State statute prevented Port St. John from considering incorporation for ten years.

In 2012, the area received national attention when a mother, Tonya Thomas, shot and killed her four teenagers and herself.

In January 2013, a brush fire ignited outside of Port St. John. By January 13, the fire had burned over 1,000 acres of land, as well as closing both lanes of State Route 407.

== Demographics ==
Historical population
Census	Pop.	Note	%±
1990	8,933		—
2000	12,112		35.6%
2010	12,267		1.3%
2020	23,474		91.4%
U.S. Decennial Census

=== 2020 census ===
As of the 2020 census, Port St. John had a population of 23,474. The median age was 42.6 years. 20.6% of residents were under the age of 18 and 16.6% of residents were 65 years of age or older. For every 100 females there were 99.0 males, and for every 100 females age 18 and over there were 97.0 males age 18 and over.

98.4% of residents lived in urban areas, while 1.6% lived in rural areas.

There were 9,099 households in Port St. John, of which 28.3% had children under the age of 18 living in them. Of all households, 51.8% were married-couple households, 17.1% were households with a male householder and no spouse or partner present, and 21.9% were households with a female householder and no spouse or partner present. About 22.0% of all households were made up of individuals and 9.3% had someone living alone who was 65 years of age or older.

There were 9,541 housing units, of which 4.6% were vacant. The homeowner vacancy rate was 1.0% and the rental vacancy rate was 6.9%.

Racial composition as of the 2020 census
Race	Number	Percent
White	18,791	80.1%
Black or African American	1,306	5.6%
American Indian and Alaska Native	81	0.3%
Asian	362	1.5%
Native Hawaiian and Other Pacific Islander	40	0.2%
Some other race	607	2.6%
Two or more races	2,287	9.7%
Hispanic or Latino (of any race)	2,080	8.9%

=== 2010 census ===
According to the 2010 United States census info, Port Saint John has a total population of 12,267.

=== 2000 census ===
As of the census of 2000, there were 12,112 people, 4,307 households, and 3,264 families residing in the CDP, although the number has grown since. The population density was 3,172.0 inhabitants per square mile (1,224.7/km^{2}). There were 4,544 housing units at an average density of 1,190.0 per square mile (459.5/km^{2}). The racial makeup of the CDP was 90.70% White, 5.01% African American, 0.47% Native American, 0.92% Asian, 0.17% Pacific Islander, 0.83% from other races, and 1.91% from two or more races. Hispanic or Latino of any race were 3.28% of the population.

There were 4,307 households, out of which 40.2% had children under the age of 18 living with them, 60.1% were married couples living together, 11.4% had a female householder with no husband present, and 24.2% were non-families. 17.7% of all households were made up of individuals, and 5.5% had someone living alone who was 65 years of age or older. The average household size was 2.73 and the average family size was 3.09.

In the CDP, the population was spread out, with 28.1% under the age of 18, 5.6% from 18 to 24, 33.0% from 25 to 44, 22.2% from 45 to 64, and 11.2% who were 65 years of age or older. The median age was 37 years. For every 100 females, there were 99.0 males. For every 100 females age 18 and over, there were 96.6 males.

The median income for a household in the CDP was $44,030, and the median income for a family was $47,342. Males had a median income of $35,912 versus $26,184 for females. The per capita income for the CDP was $17,953. About 4.7% of families and 6.6% of the population were below the poverty line, including 7.9% of those under age 18 and 6.0% of those age 65 or over.

== Education ==
=== Elementary schools ===
- Atlantis Elementary
- Challenger 7 Elementary
- Enterprise Elementary

In 2009, Atlantis Elementary was named one of the nation's top 12 schools in terms of character development, school culture and academic achievement. Teaching was termed "absolutely brilliant". It was the only school so cited in Florida. It has been a state A-rated school from 2000-2009. There are 640 students K-6. 45% of the students qualify for free or reduced lunch, a typical indication of poverty. 18% are enrolled in exceptional student classes. 20% of the students are minorities.

=== Middle and high schools ===
- Space Coast Jr./Sr. High School
