= First Coast =

First Coast Northeast Florida
- Region
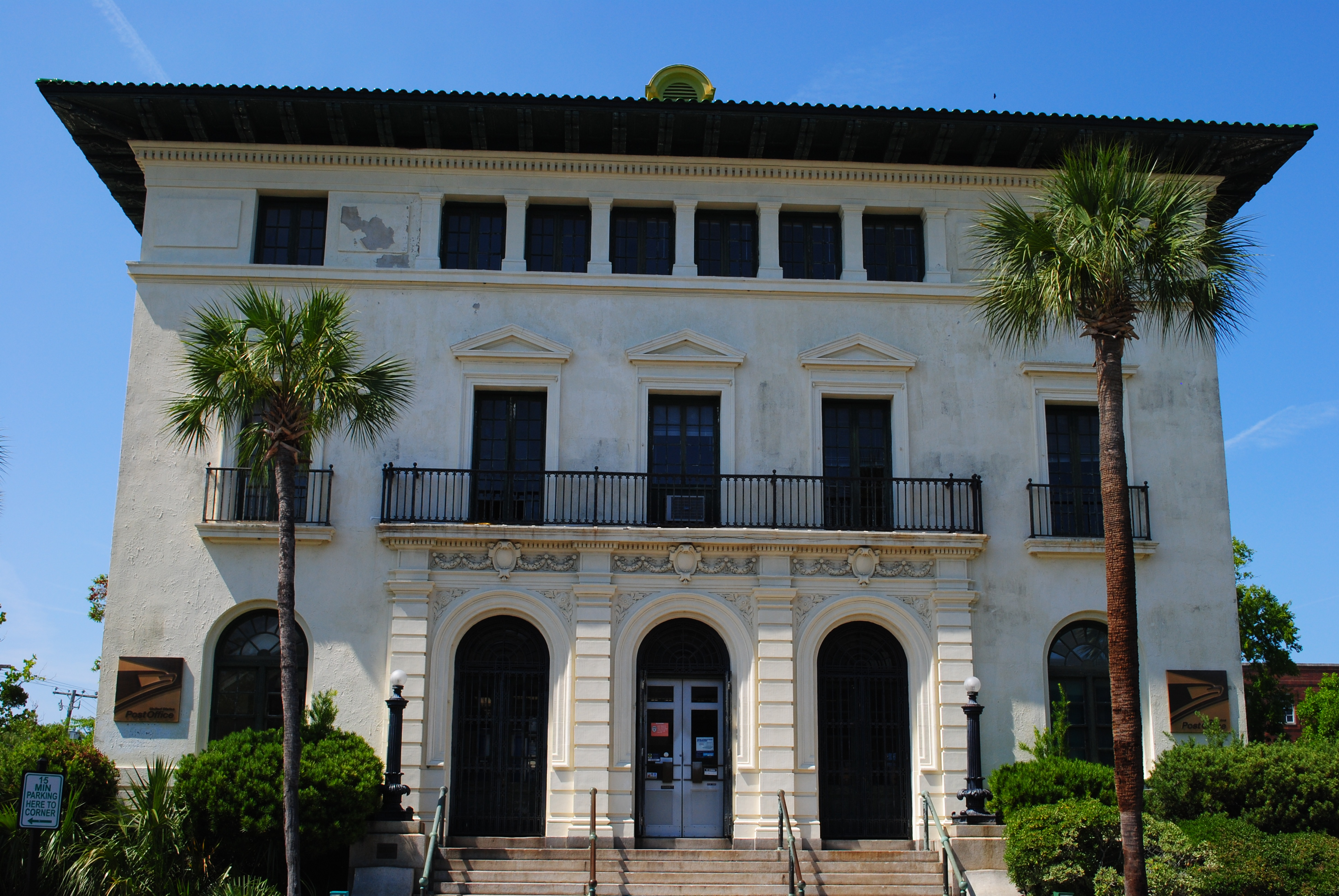
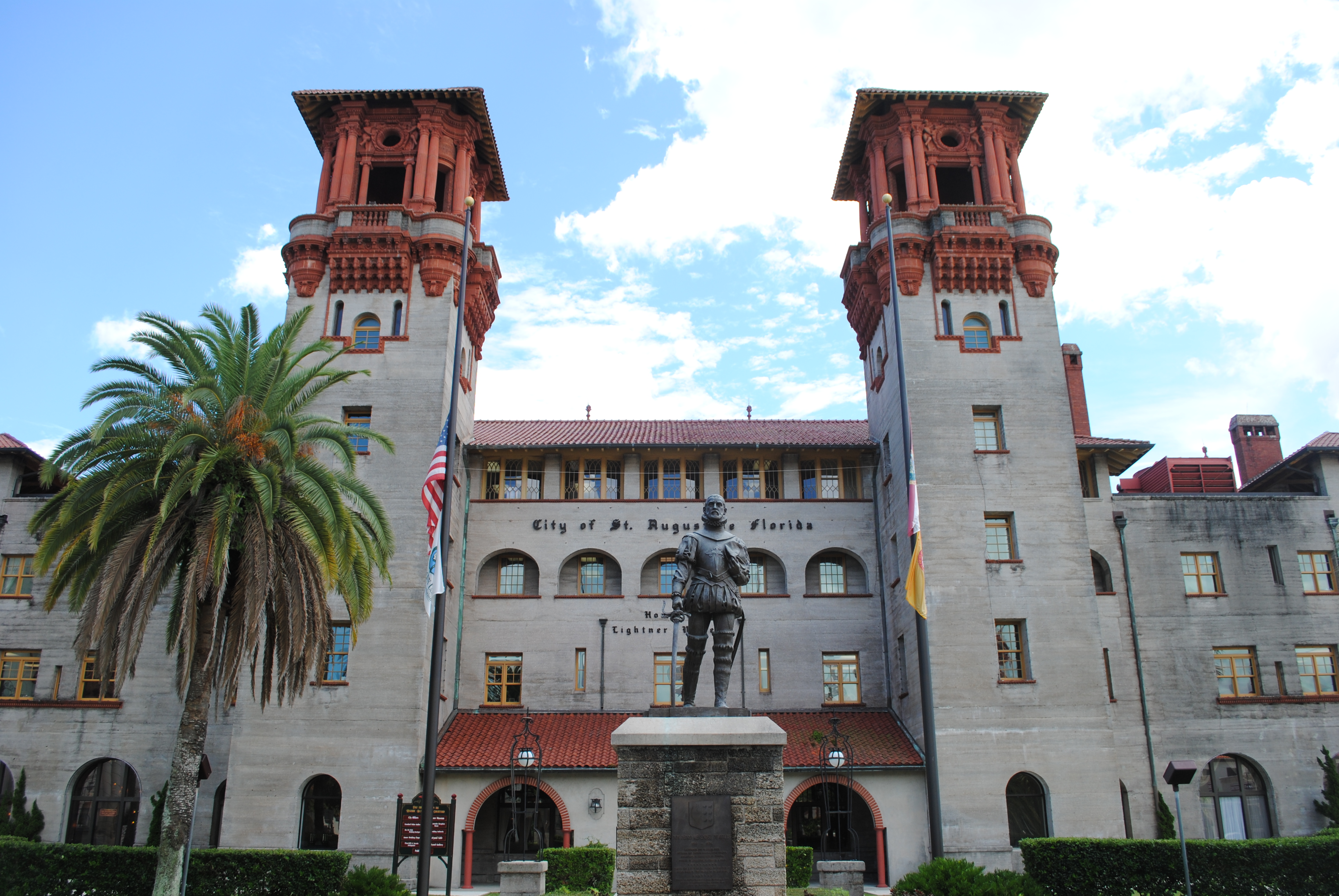
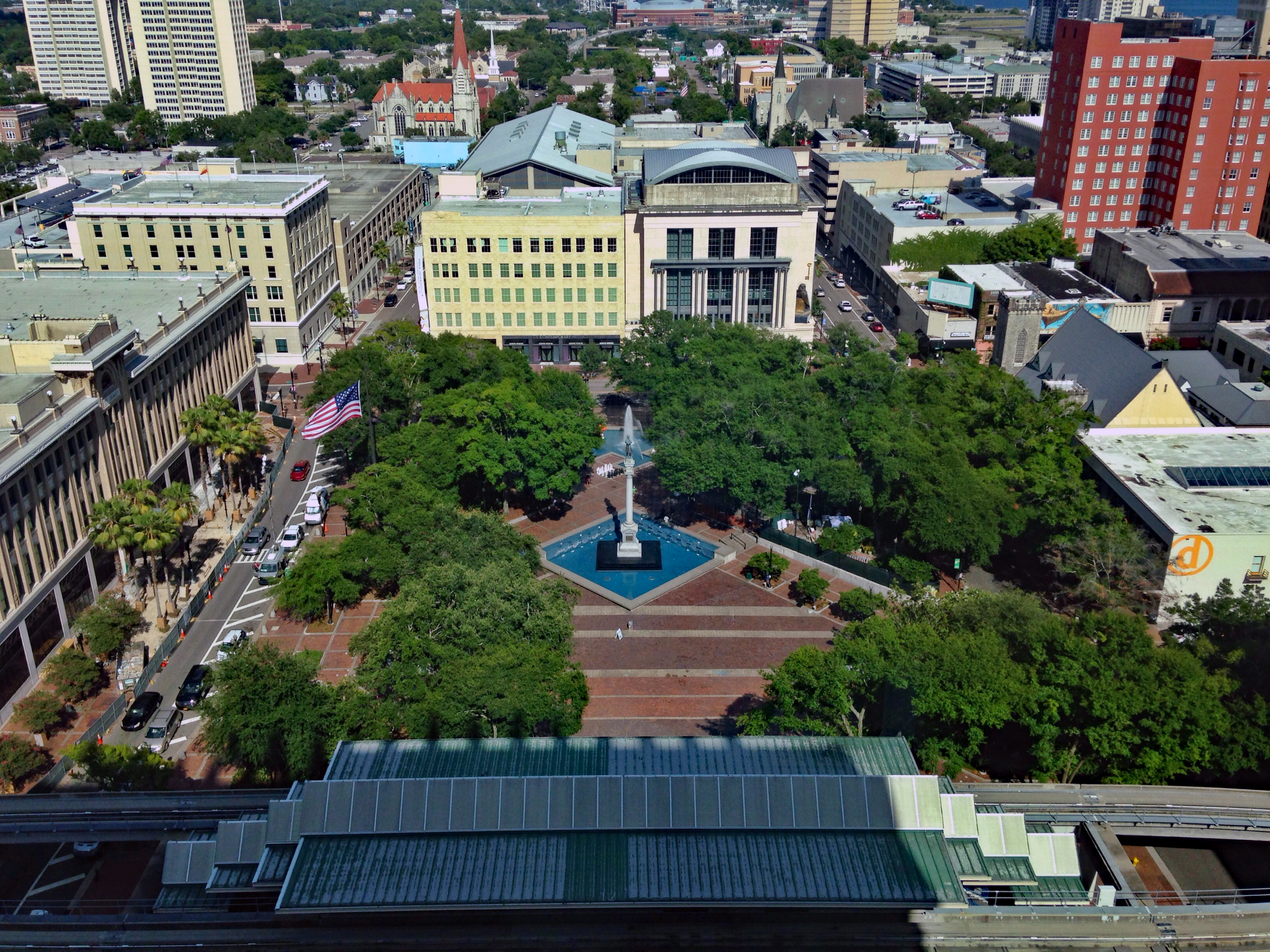
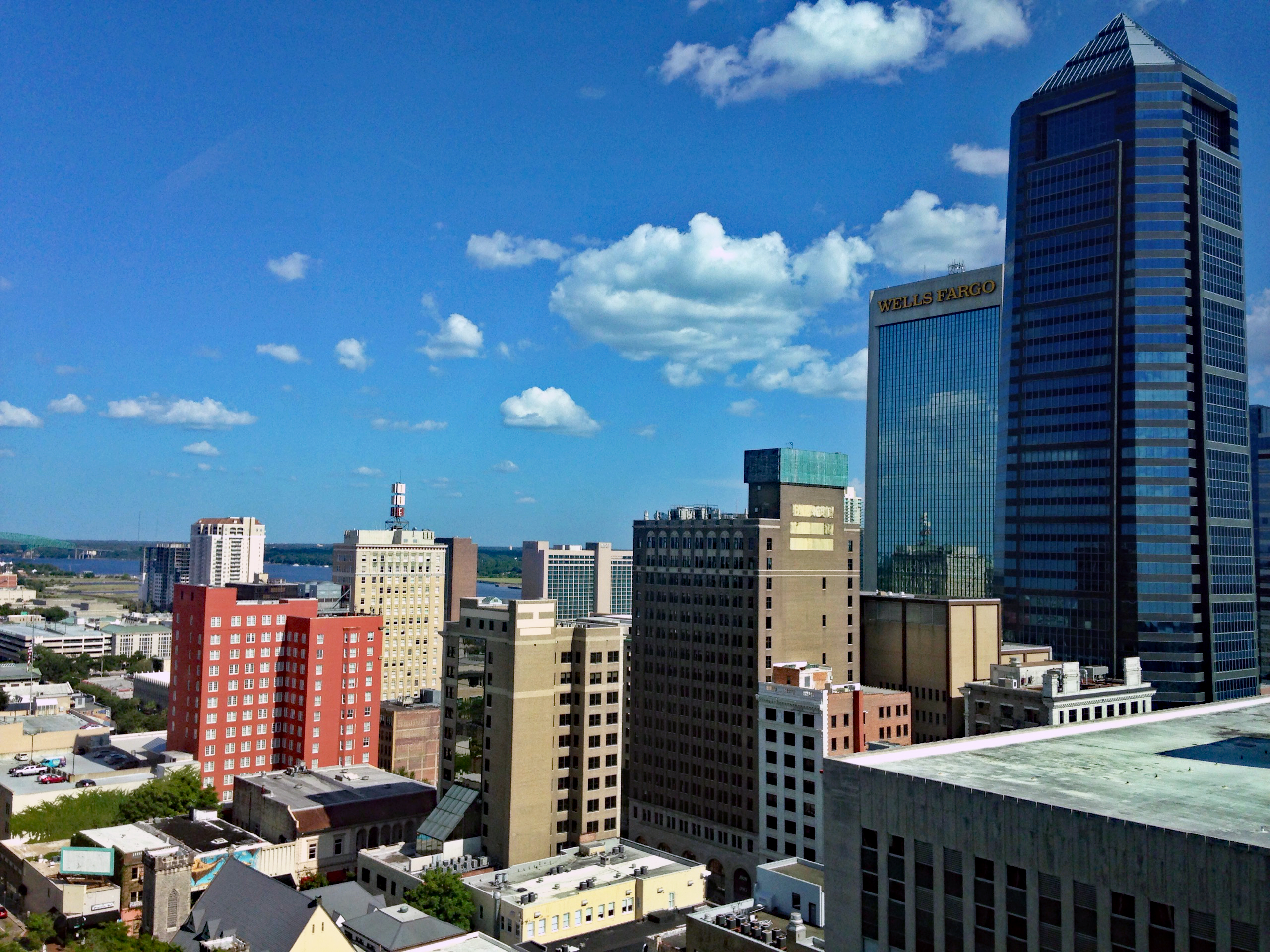
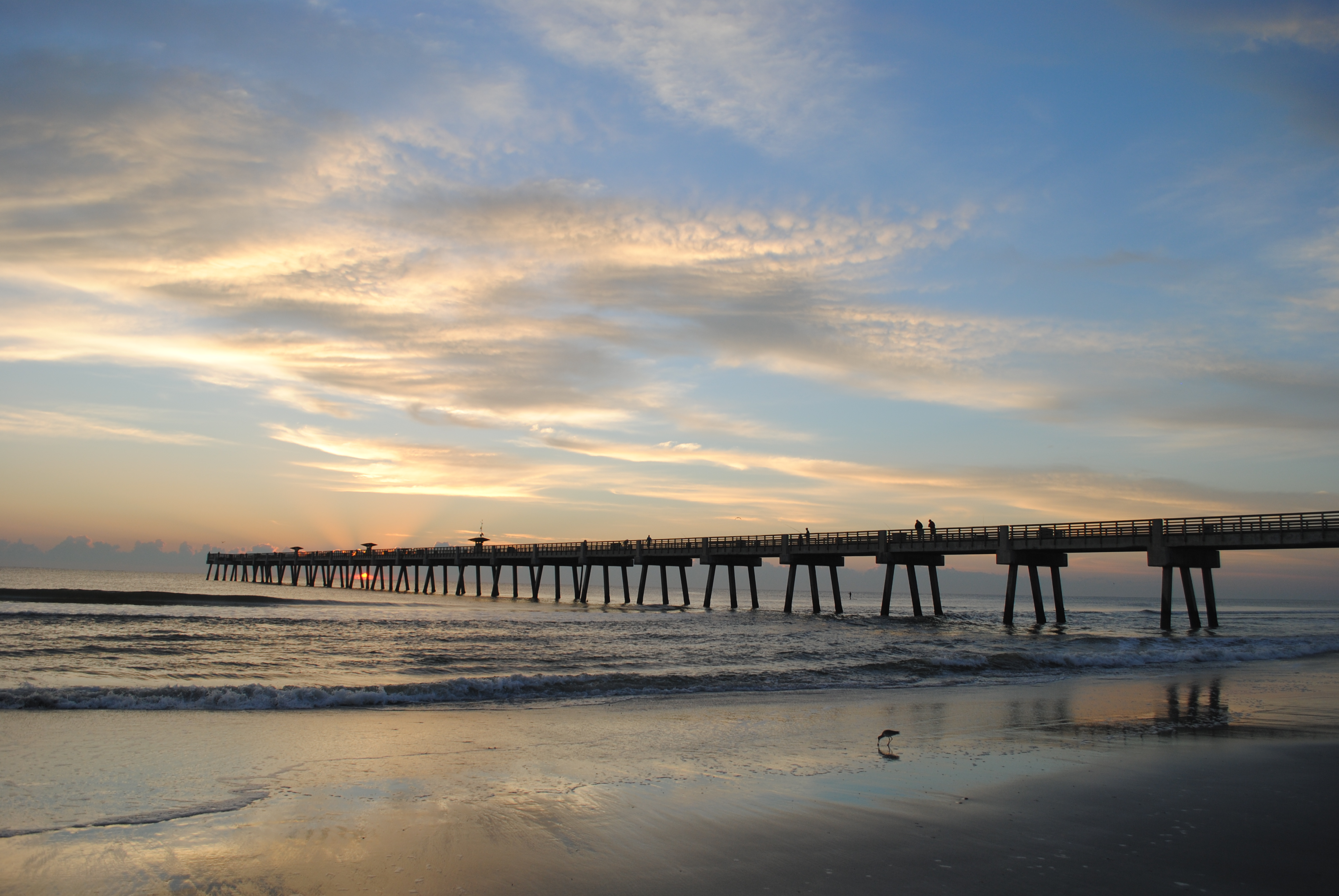
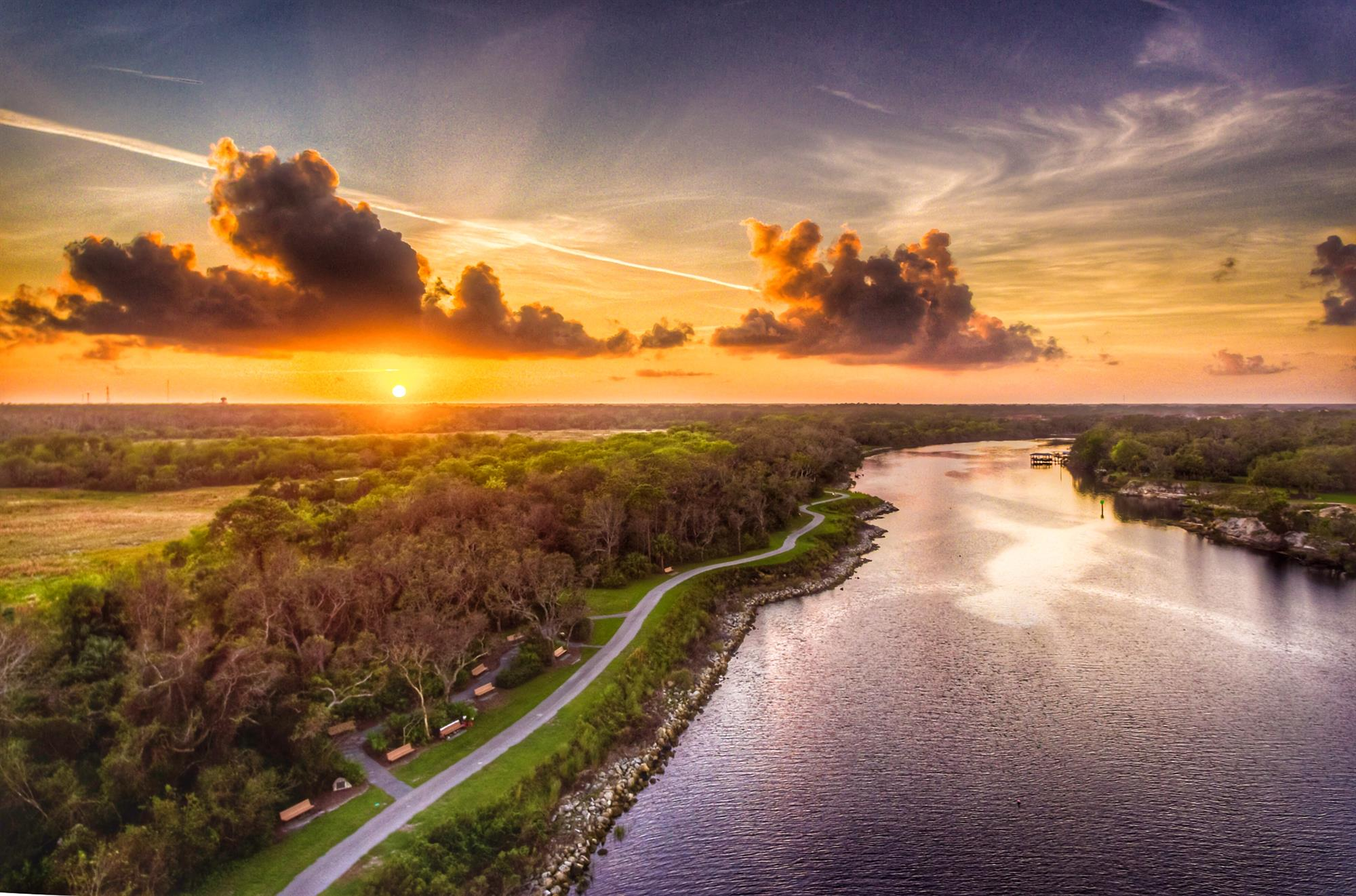
- Left to right from top: United States Post Office, Custom House, and Courthouse in Fernandina Beach, Lightner Museum in St. Augustine, James Weldon Johnson Park in Jacksonville, Downtown Jacksonville skyline, Jacksonville Beach Pier, the Matanzas River in Palm Coast.

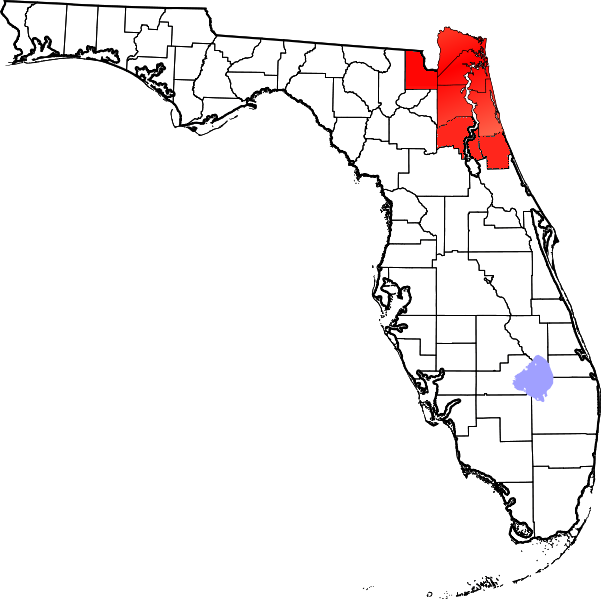
- Northeast Florida counties
- Country: United States
- State: Florida
- Largest city: Jacksonville
- Cities: Fernandina Beach; Jacksonville Beach; Palatka; Palm Coast; St. Augustine; Yulee
- Counties: Baker; Clay; Duval; Flagler; Nassau; Putnam; St. Johns

Florida's First Coast, or simply the First Coast (Spanish: Primera Costa), is the Atlantic coast of North Florida in the United States. It is the same general area as the directional region of Northeast Florida. It consists roughly of the counties abutting Jacksonville: Duval, Baker, Clay, Nassau, and St. Johns—and nearby Flagler County and Putnam County. The "First Coast" name originated in a marketing campaign in the 1980s, and has become part of Florida's regional vernacular. It is so named due to its history as the first European settlement in what is now the mainland United States, at Fort Caroline, Florida, in 1564.

== History ==
As its name suggests, the First Coast was the first area of Florida colonized by Europeans, at Fort Caroline, Florida, in 1564. However, as with several other of Florida's vernacular regions, the "First Coast" identity originated in the tourism industry of the 20th Century before it was adopted within the community at large. In 1983 the Jacksonville Chamber of Commerce commissioned the William Cook Advertising Agency to develop a new nickname and comprehensive marketing campaign for the entire metropolitan area – Duval, Baker, Clay, Nassau, and St. Johns counties. Jacksonville already had other nicknames, but local officials wanted a new identity to better promote the entire region without overshadowing the identities of the individual localities. The term "Florida's First Coast" was coined by William Cook staff members Kay Johnson, Bryan Cox, and Bill Jones, and was officially introduced in the "First Coast Anthem" at the 1983 Gator Bowl.

The First Coast is similar to Florida's various other "Coast" regions such as the Space Coast and the Gold Coast that emerged as a result of marketing campaigns. The name refers both to the area's geographic status as the "first coast" that many visitors reach when entering Florida, as well as to the region's history as the first place in the continental United States to see European contact and settlement. Juan Ponce de León may have landed in this region during his first expedition in 1513, and the early French colony of Fort Caroline was founded in present-day Jacksonville in 1564. Significantly, the First Coast includes St. Augustine, the oldest continuously inhabited European-established city in the continental U.S., founded by the Spanish in 1565.

A 2007 survey by geographers Ary J. Lamme and Raymond K. Oldakowski notes that the term "First Coast" has superseded two earlier geographical appellations for the region: "Florida's Crown" and "South Georgia", attested in earlier surveys. The former term refers to the area's northern location and the shape of the Georgia border, while the latter emphasizes that the local culture was considered more similar to that of Georgia and the South in general than to the lower Florida peninsula. A conscious push to supplant potentially uncomplimentary connotations may have led to the decline of "South Georgia" in favor of "First Coast"; this coincides with a waning of terms such as "Old South" and "Dixie" in much of the state. The name "First Coast" reinforces the region's connection to the rest of Florida, an important perceptual tie-in for attracting residents, businesses, and tourists.

The term "First Coast" became very popular through the 1980s, surprising even its creators. In 1990, Duval County opened its first new high schools in nearly 20 years, and at one of them, the students chose to name their school First Coast High School. By 2002, nearly 800 organizations and businesses included "First Coast" in their name, to the point that Jacksonville's NBC and ABC affiliates, WTLV and WJXX (both jointly owned and operated by Tegna), have branded their local news operation as "First Coast News" since the early 2000s. Lamme and Oldakowski found that in 2007, 18% of Floridians surveyed were familiar with the First Coast, making it one of the best-known vernacular regions by Floridians. The First Coast identity has spread to other nearby areas, being found as far south as Flagler Beach in Flagler County, Florida and Palatka in Putnam County, Florida, and as far north as St. Mary's, Georgia. In 2013, the Florida Times-Union noted that within the area, St. Johns County had begun to brand itself as the "Historic Coast".

== Northeast Florida ==
The "directional" region of Northeast Florida refers to largely the same area as the First Coast. Lamme and Oldakowski's 2007 survey noted that "North East Florida" had emerged as one of six common directional regions, along with North Florida, Central Florida, South Florida, North Central Florida, and South West Florida. The survey found that the term was primarily used in the north-easternmost parts of the state – Nassau and Duval Counties.

Enterprise Florida, the state's economic development agency, identifies "Northeast Florida" as one of eight economic regions used by the agency and other state and outside entities. This definition includes all five counties of the Jacksonville metropolitan area (Duval, Baker, Clay, Nassau and St. Johns), as well as Putnam and Flagler counties to the south. Other organizations such as the Florida Department of Transportation, JaxUSA Partnership (the regional business development wing of the Jacksonville Chamber of Commerce), and the Northeast Florida Regional Council also use this definition. Similarly, in June 2013, the state established the Northeast Florida Regional Transportation Commission, which covers all these counties besides Flagler.
