= Space Coast =

Region in Florida

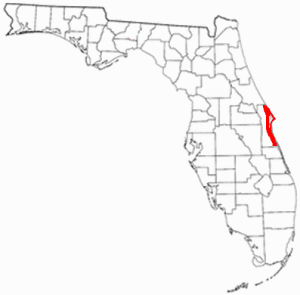
Location of Florida's Space Coast

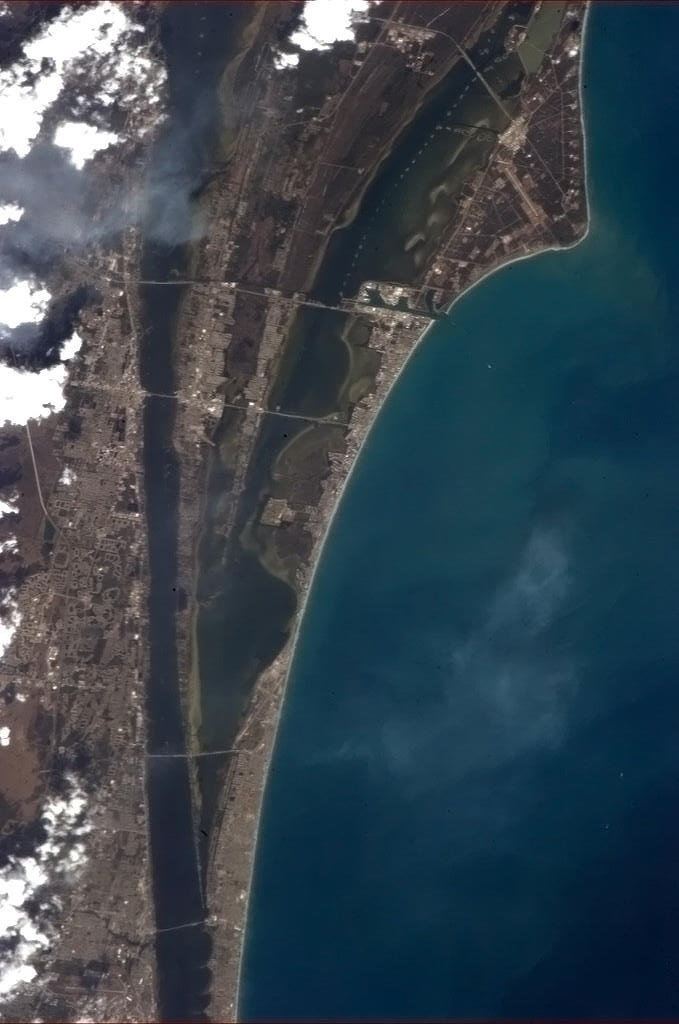
Florida's Space Coast surrounding Merritt Island, seen from the International Space Station

The Space Coast is a region in the U.S. state of Florida around the Kennedy Space Center (KSC) and Cape Canaveral Space Force Station. It is one of several "themed" coasts around Florida. All orbital launches from American soil carrying NASA and commercial astronauts as of 2025 (starting from Project Mercury in 1961 and continuing in the Commercial Crew Program and SpaceX Crew Dragon private missions since 2020) have departed from either KSC or Cape Canaveral. The Space Force Station has also launched unmanned military and civilian rockets. Cities in the area include Port St. John, Titusville, Cocoa, Rockledge, Cape Canaveral, Merritt Island (unincorporated), Cocoa Beach, Melbourne, Satellite Beach, Indian Harbour Beach, Indialantic, Melbourne Beach, Palm Bay, and Viera (unincorporated). Much of the area lies within Brevard County. It is bounded on the south by the Treasure Coast, on the west by Central Florida including Orlando (and is economically tied to that region), on the north by Volusia County, and on the east by the Atlantic Ocean.

One reason rockets are launched from the Space Coast has to do with the Earth's rotation. The Earth rotates from west to east, most quickly at the equator, and to take advantage of this, adding the speed of rotation to the orbital velocity of the rocket, it is most beneficial to launch eastward from a location near the equator. Launching from an uninhabited location on an easterly coast at low latitude, minimizing the danger posed by debris from a failed launch, is ideal both for the safety of the people on the ground and for fuel efficiency of the rocket. Given the high population densities in coastal Texas, South Florida, and Puerto Rico, the Space Coast is often considered the best location when all factors are taken into account.

== Space-named landmarks (outside KSC and Cape Canaveral Space Force Station) ==
Many places near the Cape are named for subjects relating to the US space program including vehicles, astronauts, and the spaceport itself.

- Alan Shepard Park, Cocoa Beach
- Apollo Boulevard, Melbourne
- Apollo Elementary School, Titusville
- Armstrong Drive, Titusville
- Astronaut Boulevard, Cape Canaveral
- Astronaut High School, Titusville
- Atlantis Elementary School, Port St. John
- Bayside High School, Palm Bay
- Challenger 7 Elementary School, Port St. John
- Challenger Memorial Parkway, (State Road 407), Titusville
- Chaffee Drive, Titusville
- Christa McAuliffe drawbridge, Merritt Island
- Christa McAuliffe Elementary School, Palm Bay
- Columbia Boulevard (State Road 405), Titusville
- Columbia Elementary School, Palm Bay
- Columbia Village, Melbourne (Florida Institute of Technology)
- Discovery Elementary School, Palm Bay
- Endeavour Elementary Magnet school, Cocoa
- Enterprise Elementary School, Cocoa
- Freedom 7 Elementary School, Cocoa Beach
- Gemini Elementary School, Melbourne Beach
- Grissom Parkway, Cocoa
- I Dream Of Jeannie Drive, Cocoa Beach
- John F. Kennedy Middle School, Rockledge
- Jupiter Boulevard, Palm Bay
- Kennedy Point Park, Titusville
- MILA Elementary School, Merritt Island (an abbreviation for "Merritt Island Launch Area")
- Minutemen Causeway, Cocoa Beach
- NASA Boulevard (State Road 508), Melbourne
- Ronald McNair Middle Magnet School, Rockledge
- Satellite Beach, Florida
- Satellite Boulevard, Cocoa
- Satellite High School, Satellite Beach
- Shepard Drive, Titusville
- Space Coast Jr./Sr. High School
- Space Coast Stadium, Viera, Florida
- Space Coast Surge, a member of the Florida Winter Baseball League played out of Cocoa in 2009
- Space View Park, Titusville
- White Drive, Titusville

== Telephone area code ==
When the region became too heavily populated to be served by only one area code, local resident Robert Osband (aka Richard Cheshire) discovered that area code 321 was not assigned to any other territory (though it was being considered for the suburban Chicago area). (Note: This includes most of the county except the Southern portion.) If each number is pronounced individually—"3, 2, 1"—the pronunciation resembles the countdown before liftoff; thus, Osband petitioned for the code to be assigned to the Space Coast region. His efforts were popular among local residents and resulted in success; the new code officially became effective on November 1, 1999. Robert Osband's own phone number was 321-543-8633 or 321-LIFTOFF.

== Tourism ==
Because it is home to Kennedy Space Center and Cape Canaveral Space Force Station the local area is popular with visitors to watch rocket launches in person. Over 100,000 people are believed to have been present in February 2018 for the Falcon Heavy test flight. It is home to Kennedy Space Center Visitor Complex, US Space Walk of Fame, and the Air Force Space and Missile Museum. Nearly 1 million people were present to watch the last space shuttle launch in 2011. 150,000 people were present for the Crew Dragon Demo-2 launch. The area is also home to many space-themed businesses. 750,000 to 900,000 people gathered on the space coast to watch the Apollo 11 launch in 1969.

The area also sees Christmas tourism, as thousands of people attend the Surfing Santas festival in Cocoa Beach (by Cape Canaveral) over the holiday season. Cocoa Beach attracts all types of people looking for a vacation because of the beachy location. A weekend here may have people stopping by a surf museum or shopping at a tiki gallery.

== Espionage ==
With its concentration of major aerospace and defense firms and overall importance for the U.S. space program, Florida's Space Coast is a target of Chinese government espionage efforts.

== Media ==
Brevard Business News is a weekly newspaper in Melbourne, Florida, United States covering business news and trends for the Space Coast. Fred Krupski started Brevard Business News in 1981, and Adrienne B. Roth purchased it in 1986. Other media outlets serving the Brevard County community include the Florida Today, Space Coast Daily, Hometown News, Spectrum TV 13 and numerous radio stations. Several national TV network affiliates based in Orlando also cover Brevard County news.

== See also ==
- First Coast - further to the north
- Gold Coast - further to the south
- Halifax area - to the north
- Space Coast Office of Tourism
- Treasure Coast - to the south
