= 2012 United States House of Representatives elections in Nevada =

- November 6, 2012

All 4 Nevada seats to the United States House of Representatives
	Majority party	Minority party
Party	Republican	Democratic
Last election	2	1
Seats won	2	2
Seat change	Steady	▲1
Popular vote	457,239	453,310
Percentage	46.96%	46.55%
Swing	▼3.89%	▲1.33%

Democratic
50–60%
60–70%
Republican
50–60%
60–70%
70–80%

The 2012 United States House of Representatives elections in Nevada were held on Tuesday, November 6, 2012, and elected the four U.S. Representatives from Nevada, one from each of the state's four congressional districts, an increase of one seat in reapportionment following the 2010 United States census. Representatives are elected for two-year terms; those elected will serve in the 112th Congress from January 2013 until January 2015. The elections coincided with the elections of other federal and state offices, including a quadrennial presidential election, and an election to the U.S. Senate. Primary elections were held on June 12, 2012.

== Overview ==
=== Statewide ===
Party	Candidates	Votes		Seats		
Party	Candidates	No.	%	No.	+/–	%
Republican	4	457,239	46.96	2	Steady	50.00
Democratic	4	453,310	46.55	2	▲1	50.00
Independent American	3	25,185	2.59	0	Steady	0.0
Independent	2	24,022	2.47	0	Steady	0.0
Libertarian	3	13,986	1.44	0	Steady	0.0
Total	16	973,742	100.0	4	▲1	100.0

Popular vote
Republican	46.96%
Democratic	46.55%
American Ind	2.59%
Libertarian	1.44%
Other	2.47%

House seats
Republican	50.00%
Democratic	50.00%

=== By district ===
Results of the 2014 United States House of Representatives elections in Nevada by district:

District	Republican		Democratic		Others		Total		Result
District	Votes	%	Votes	%	Votes	%	Votes	%	Result
District 1	56,521	31.53%	113,967	63.57%	8,790	4.90%	179,278	100.0%	Democratic hold
District 2	162,213	57.63%	103,019	36.60%	16,217	5.76%	281,449	100.0%	Republican hold
District 3	137,244	50.36%	116,823	42.87%	18,456	7.79%	272,523	100.0%	Republican hold
District 4	101,261	42.11%	120,501	50.11%	18,730	6.49%	240,492	100.0%	Democratic win
Total	457,239	46.96%	453,310	46.55%	63,193	6.49%	973,742	100.0%	

== District 1 ==
2012 Nevada's 1st congressional district election
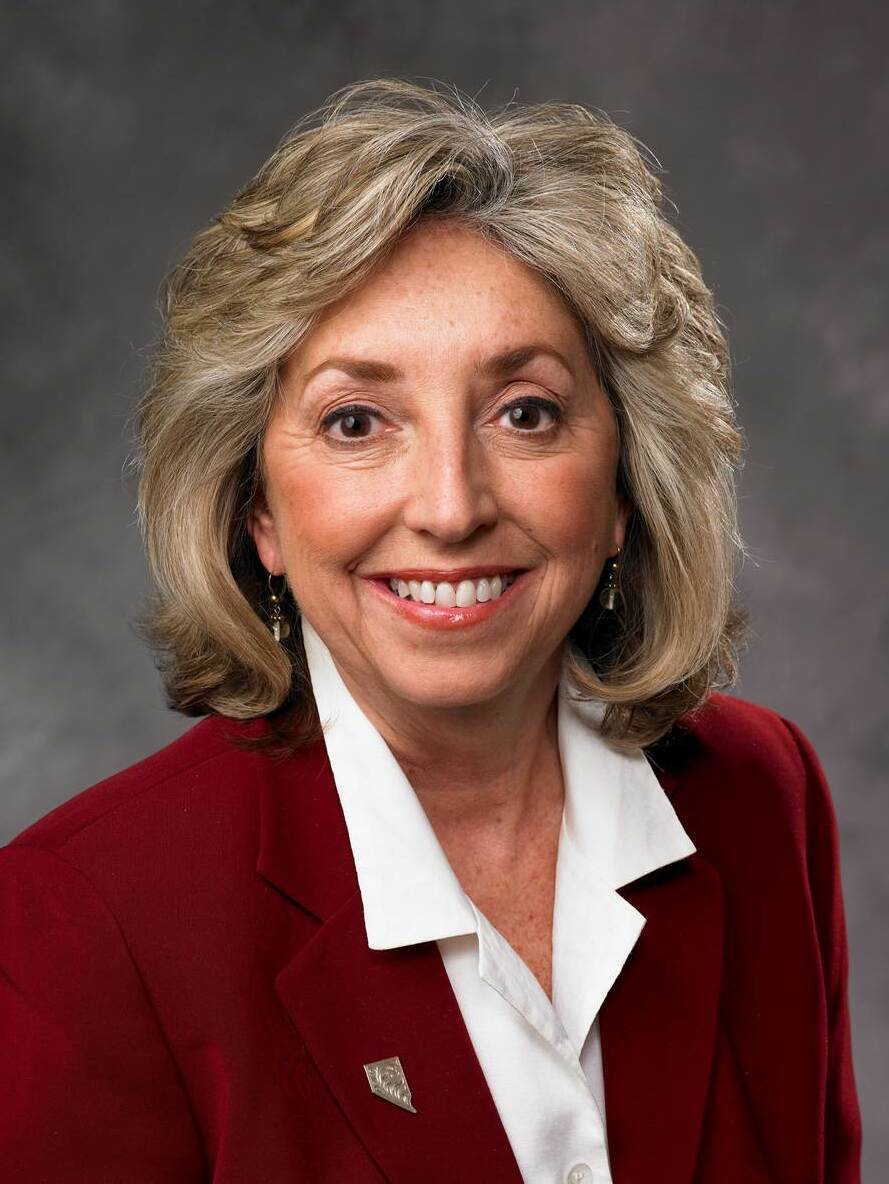

Nominee	Dina Titus	Chris Edwards
Party	Democratic	Republican
Popular vote	113,967	56,521
Percentage	63.6%	31.5%
- Titus: 60–70%
U.S. Representative before election
Shelley Berkley
Democratic
Elected U.S. Representative
Dina Titus
Democratic

Democrat Shelley Berkley, who had represented Nevada's 1st congressional district since 1999, ran for the U.S. Senate.

=== Democratic primary ===
==== Candidates ====
===== Nominee =====
- Dina Titus, former U.S. Representative for the 3rd district

===== Withdrawn =====
- Ruben Kihuen, state senator

===== Declined =====
- Shelley Berkley, incumbent U.S. Representative (ran unsuccessfully for U.S. Senate)

=== Republican primary ===
==== Candidates ====
===== Nominee =====
- Chris Edwards, security strategic planner and Navy officer

===== Eliminated in primary =====
- Charmaine Guss, former real estate broker and anti-abortion activist
- Brian Landsberger, retired mechanical engineer and former Air Force fighter pilot
- Herb Peters, retired aerospace engineer and seven-time Libertarian candidate for Congress in California
- Miguel "Mike" Rodrigues, elementary school principal

==== Primary results ====
Republican primary results
Party	Candidate	Votes	%
Republican	Chris Edwards	4,786	48.2
Republican	Brian Landsberger	1,800	18.1
Republican	Charmaine Guss	1,534	15.5
Republican	Miguel "Mike" Rodrigues	1,163	11.7
Republican	Herb Peters	643	6.5
Total votes		9,926	100.0

=== Libertarian primary ===
Bill Pojunis ran as the nominee of the Libertarian Party of Nevada.

=== Independent American primary ===
Stan Vaughan ran as the nominee of the Independent American Party of Nevada.

=== General election ===
==== Endorsements ====
Dina Titus (D)

State legislators

- Joseph Hogan, state assemblyman
- Joe Neal, former state senator
- Valerie Wiener, state senator

Labor unions

- Culinary Workers Union
- National Association of Letter Carriers

Organizations

- Democratic Congressional Campaign Committee "Majority Makers" Program
- EMILY's List
- Human Rights Campaign
- Humane Society of the United States
- League of Conservation Voters
- NARAL Pro-Choice America
- National Organization for Women
- Planned Parenthood Action Fund

Newspapers

- Las Vegas Sun

Local officials

- Steve Sisolak, Clark County Commissioner
Chris Edwards (R)

Organizations

- National Right to Life Committee

==== Predictions ====
Source	Ranking	As of
The Cook Political Report	Safe D	November 5, 2012
Rothenberg	Safe D	November 2, 2012
Roll Call	Safe D	November 4, 2012
Sabato's Crystal Ball	Safe D	November 5, 2012
NY Times	Safe D	November 4, 2012
RCP	Safe D	November 4, 2012
The Hill	Safe D	November 4, 2012

==== Results ====
Nevada's 1st congressional district, 2012
Party	Candidate	Votes	%
Democratic	Dina Titus	113,967	63.6
Republican	Chris Edwards	56,521	31.5
Libertarian	William "Bill" Pojunis	4,645	2.6
Independent American	Stan Vaughan	4,145	2.3
Total votes		179,278	100.0
Democratic hold			

== District 2 ==
2012 Nevada's 2nd congressional district election
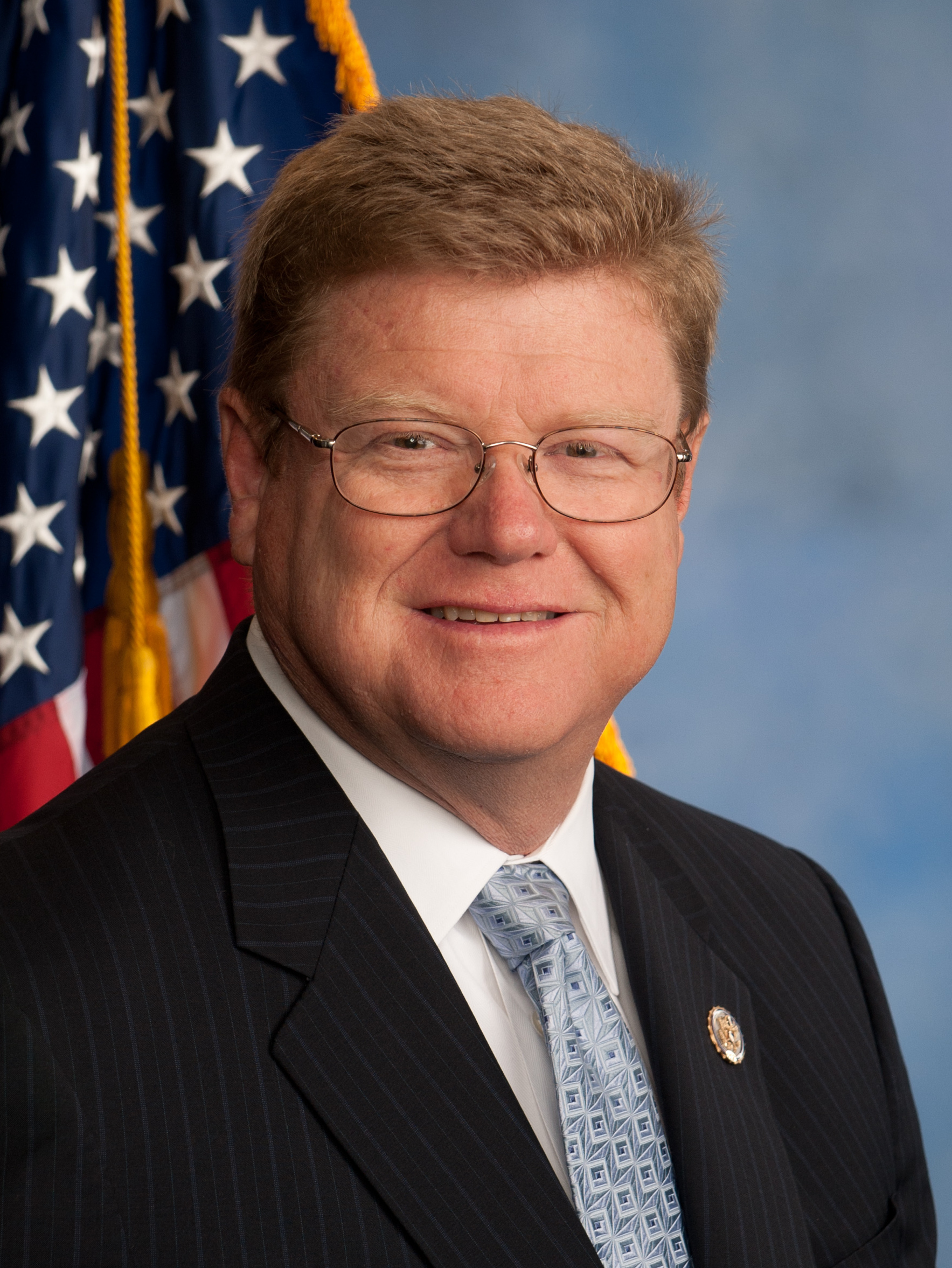

Nominee	Mark Amodei	Samuel Koepnick
Party	Republican	Democratic
Popular vote	162,213	103,019
Percentage	57.6%	36.6%
- County results Amodei: 50–60% 60–70% 70–80%
U.S. Representative before election
Mark Amodei
Republican
Elected U.S. Representative
Mark Amodei
Republican

Republican Mark Amodei, who has represented Nevada's 2nd congressional district since being elected in a special election in September 2011, ran for re-election.

=== Republican primary ===
==== Candidates ====
===== Nominee =====
- Mark Amodei, incumbent U.S. Representative

===== Declined =====
- Sharron Angle, former state assemblywoman and nominee for Senate in 2010

=== Democratic primary ===
==== Candidates ====
===== Nominee =====
- Samuel Koepnick, information technology employee for the state

===== Eliminated in primary =====
- Sam Dehne, retired pilot
- Xiomara Rodriguez, retired businesswoman

==== Primary results ====
Democratic primary results
Party	Candidate	Votes	%
Democratic	Samuel Koepnick	8,865	40.5
Democratic	Xiomara "Xio" Rodriguez	7,404	33.9
Democratic	Sam Dehne	5,604	25.6
Total votes		21,873	100.0

=== Independent American primary ===
Russell Best, a real estate broker and Navy veteran, ran as the nominee of the Independent American Party of Nevada.

=== General election ===
==== Endorsements ====
Mark Amodei (R)

Organizations

- NRA Political Victory Fund
- National Right to Life Committee
- United States Chamber of Commerce

==== Predictions ====
Source	Ranking	As of
The Cook Political Report	Safe R	November 5, 2012
Rothenberg	Safe R	November 2, 2012
Roll Call	Safe R	November 4, 2012
Sabato's Crystal Ball	Safe R	November 5, 2012
NY Times	Safe R	November 4, 2012
RCP	Safe R	November 4, 2012
The Hill	Safe R	November 4, 2012

==== Results ====
Nevada's 2nd congressional district, 2012
Party	Candidate	Votes	%
Republican	Mark Amodei (incumbent)	162,213	57.6
Democratic	Samuel Koepnick	103,019	36.3
Independent	Michael L. Haines	11,166	4.0
Independent American	Russell Best	6,051	2.1
Total votes		281,449	100.0
Republican hold			

== District 3 ==
2012 Nevada's 3rd congressional district election
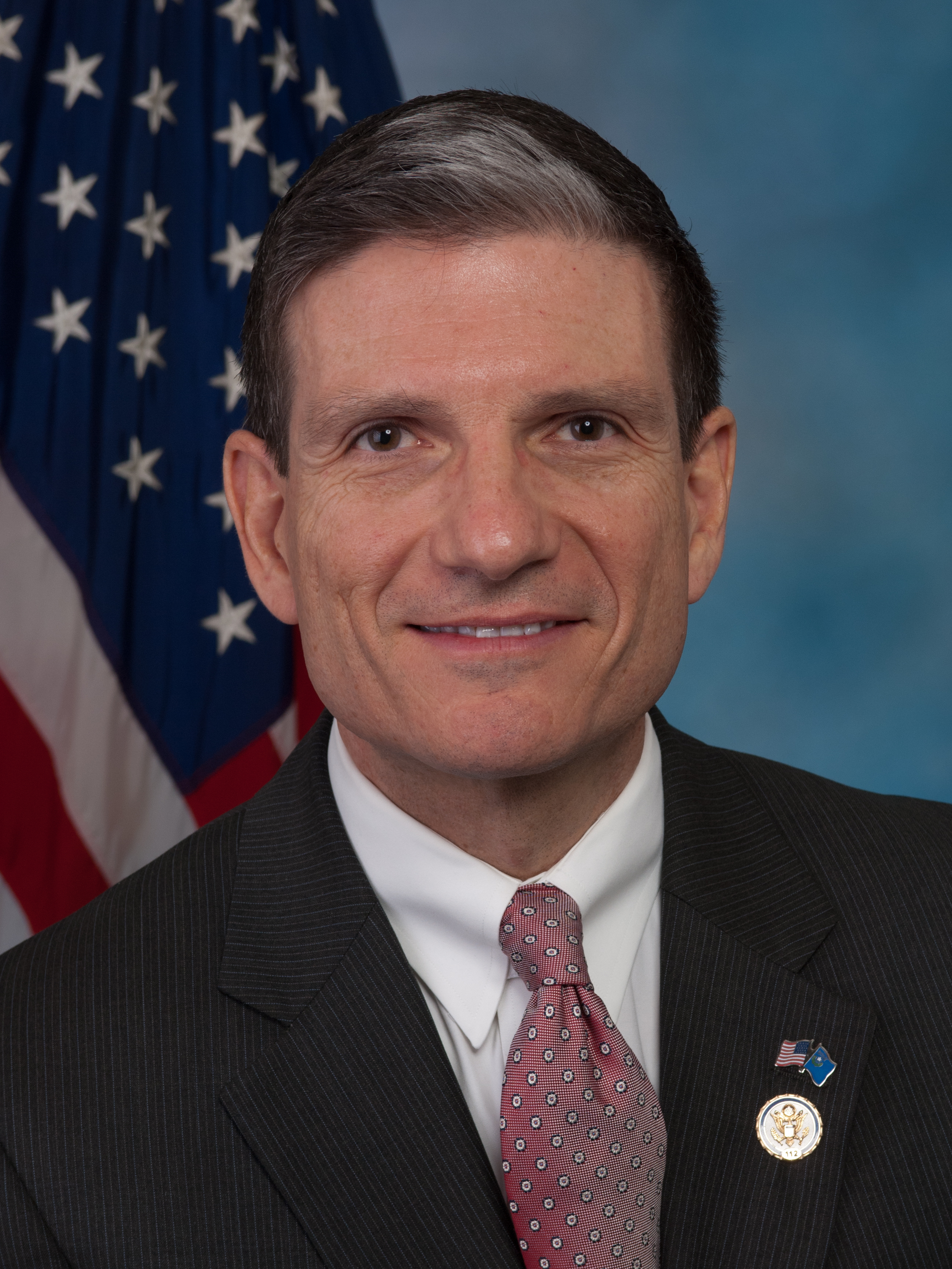

Nominee	Joe Heck	John Oceguera
Party	Republican	Democratic
Popular vote	137,244	116,823
Percentage	50.4%	42.9%
- County results Heck: 50–60%
U.S. Representative before election
Joe Heck
Republican
Elected U.S. Representative
Joe Heck
Republican

Republican Joe Heck, who has represented Nevada's 3rd congressional district since January 2011, ran for re-election.

=== Republican primary ===
==== Candidates ====
===== Nominee =====
- Joe Heck, incumbent U.S. Representative

===== Eliminated in primary =====
- Chris Dyer, food service employee and Army and Navy veteran

==== Primary results ====
Republican primary results
Party	Candidate	Votes	%
Republican	Joe Heck (incumbent)	20,798	90.0
Republican	Chris Dyer	2,298	10.0
Total votes		23,096	100.0

=== Democratic primary ===
==== Candidates ====
===== Nominee =====
- John Oceguera, Speaker of the Nevada Assembly

===== Eliminated in primary =====
- Stephen Frye, psychiatrist
- James F. Haning II, businessman
- Jesse "Jake" Holder, former Navy officer and Political Science student at UNLV
- Barry Michaels, businessman
- Gerald "Jerry" Sakura, retired business executive.

===== Declined =====
- Dina Titus, former U.S. Representative

==== Primary results ====
Democratic primary results
Party	Candidate	Votes	%
Democratic	John Oceguera	7,966	50.4
Democratic	Stephen Frye	2,659	16.8
Democratic	Jesse "Jake" Holder	2,099	13.3
Democratic	Barry Michaels	1,346	8.5
Democratic	Gerald "Jerry" Sakura	989	6.3
Democratic	James F. Haning II	736	4.7
Total votes		15,795	100.0

=== Independent American primary ===
Tom Jones, a retired businessman, ran as the nominee of the Independent American Party of Nevada.

=== Independents ===
James Murphy, a retired airline captain, ran as an independent.

=== General election ===
==== Endorsements ====
Joe Heck (R)

Organizations

- Campaign for Working Families
- National Republican Congressional Committee "Patriot" Program
- National Rifle Association of America
- National Right to Life Committee
- United States Chamber of Commerce
John Oceguera (D)

Labor unions

- National Association of Letter Carriers

Organizations

- Democratic Congressional Campaign Committee "Red to Blue" Program
- League of Conservation Voters
- NARAL Pro-Choice America
- Planned Parenthood Action Fund

Newspapers

- Las Vegas Sun

==== Debates ====
- Nevada 3rd Congressional District Debate, October 11, 2012, C-SPAN

==== Polling ====
Poll source	Date(s) administered	Sample size	Margin of error	Joe Heck (R)	John Oceguera (D)	Other	Undecided
SurveyUSA	October 21–23, 2012	502	±4.5%	50%	40%	5%	5%
WPA Opinion Research (R-Heck)	October 7–8, 2012	400	±4.9%	48%	37%	4%	12%
Benenson (D-Oceguera)	October 1–3, 2012	400	±4.9%	45%	40%	10%	5%
Global Strategy (D-DCCC)	September 27–30, 2012	405	±4.9%	42%	38%	—	20%
SurveyUSA	September 10–12, 2012	663	±3.9%	53%	40%	4%	4%

==== Predictions ====
Source	Ranking	As of
The Cook Political Report	Lean R	November 5, 2012
Rothenberg	Lean R	November 2, 2012
Roll Call	Lean R	November 4, 2012
Sabato's Crystal Ball	Lean R	November 5, 2012
NY Times	Lean R	November 4, 2012
RCP	Lean R	November 4, 2012
The Hill	Tossup	November 4, 2012

==== Results ====
Nevada's 3rd congressional district, 2012
Party	Candidate	Votes	%
Republican	Joe Heck (incumbent)	137,244	50.4
Democratic	John Oceguera	116,823	42.9
Independent	Jim Murphy	12,856	4.7
Independent American	Tom Jones	5,600	2.0
Total votes		272,523	100.0
Republican hold			

== District 4 ==
2012 Nevada's 4th congressional district election
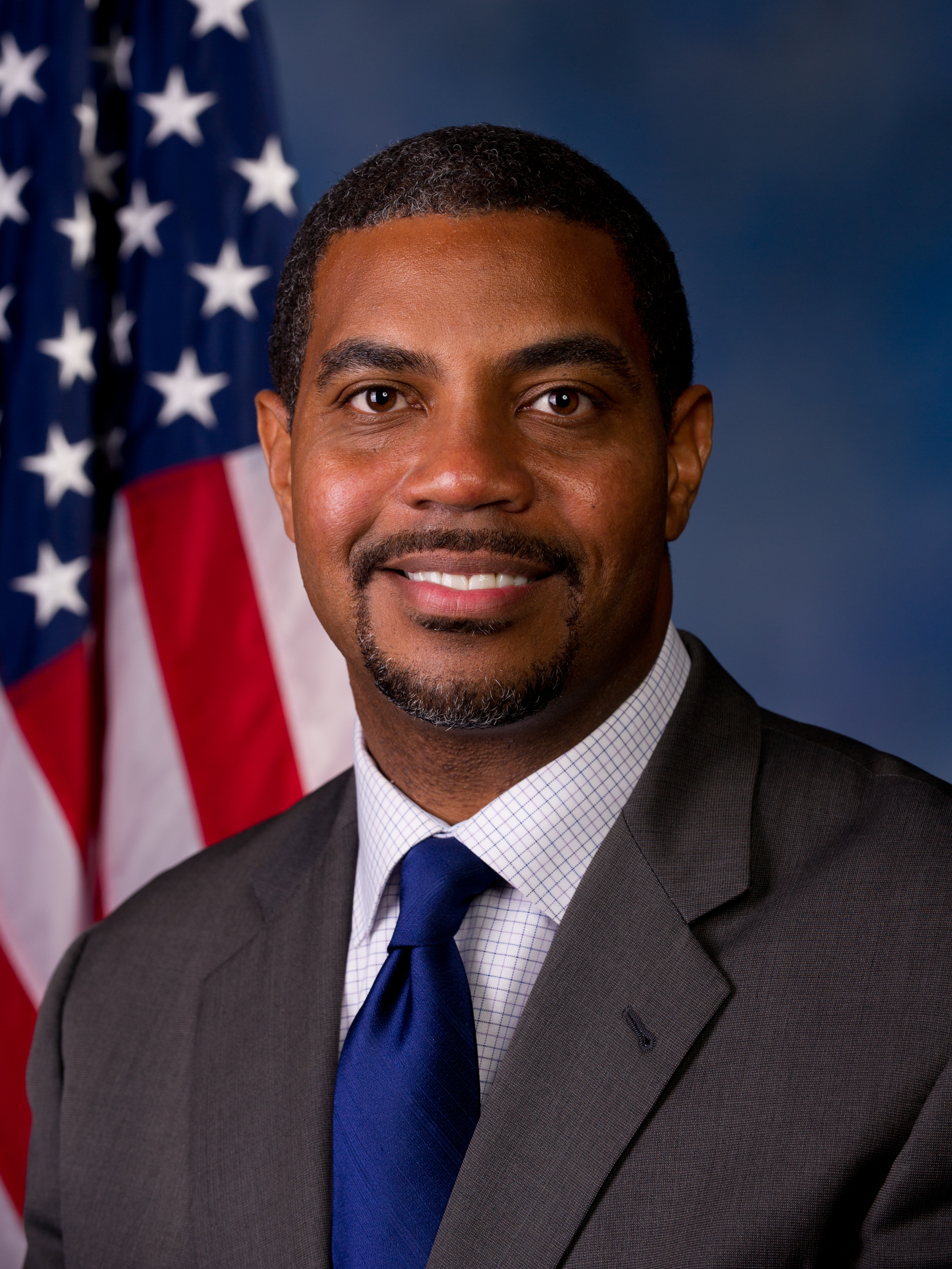

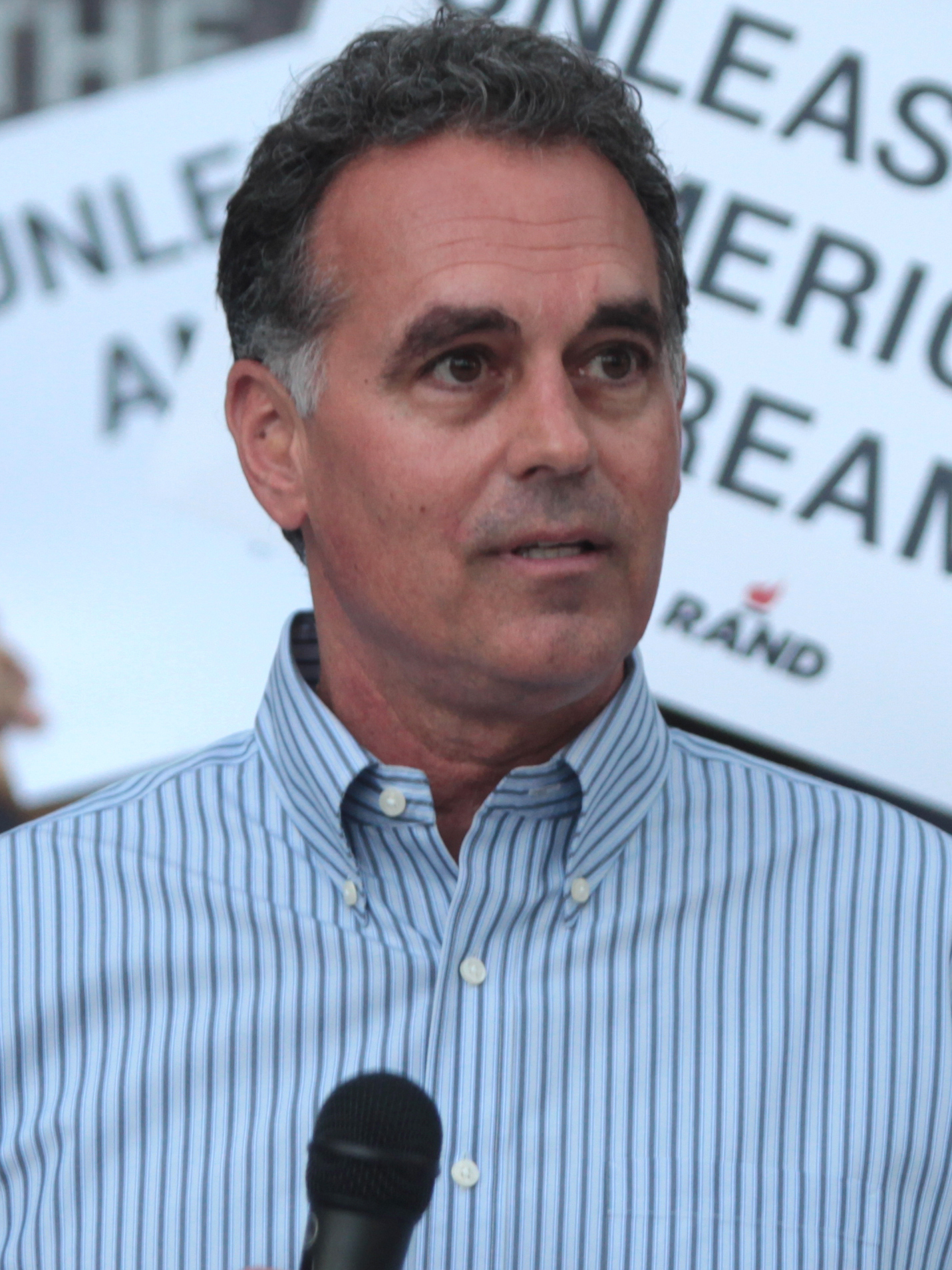
Nominee	Steven Horsford	Danny Tarkanian
Party	Democratic	Republican
Popular vote	120,501	101,261
Percentage	50.1%	42.1%
- County results Horsford: 50–60% Tarkanian: 50–60% 60–70% 70–80%
U.S. Representative before election
None
(New district)
Elected U.S. Representative
Steven Horsford
Democratic

Nevada's 4th congressional district was created for the 2012 elections as a result of reapportionment following the 2010 United States census. It consists of most of Central Nevada and Northern Clark County, the latter of which contains the bulk of the district's population.

=== Democratic primary ===
==== Candidates ====
===== Nominee =====
- Steven Horsford, majority leader of the Nevada Senate

===== Withdrawn =====
- John Lee, state senator

=== Republican primary ===
==== Candidates ====
===== Nominee =====
- Danny Tarkanian, businessman, nominee for Secretary of State in 2006 and candidate for Senate in 2010

===== Eliminated in primary =====
- Diana Anderson, retired clerical worker
- Barbara Cegavske, state senator
- Mike Delarosa, detention officer
- Kiran Hill, translator for the State Department
- Robert Leeds, author and former Merchant Marine
- Dan Schwartz, businessman
- Kenneth Wegner, retired Army veteran and nominee for the 1st district in 2006, 2008 and 2010
- Sid Zeller, retired Marine intelligence officer

==== Primary results ====
Republican primary election
Party	Candidate	Votes	%
Republican	Danny Tarkanian	7,605	31.5
Republican	Barbara Cegavske	6,674	27.7
Republican	Kenneth Wegner	5,069	21.0
Republican	Dan Schwartz	2,728	11.3
Republican	Kiran Hill	666	2.8
Republican	Diana Anderson	607	2.5
Republican	Mike Delarosa	370	1.5
Republican	Sid Zeller	252	1.0
Republican	Robert X. Leeds	165	0.7
Total votes		24,136	100.0

=== Libertarian primary ===
Joseph Silvestri, a teacher and chairman of the Libertarian Party of Nevada, also ran.

=== Independent American primary ===
Floyd Fitzgibbons, an insurance agent, ran as the nominee of the Independent American Party of Nevada.

=== General election ===
==== Endorsements ====
Steven Horsford (D)

Executive branch officials

- Barack Obama, President of the United States

Labor unions

- AFL-CIO
- National Association of Letter Carriers

Organizations

- Democratic Congressional Campaign Committee "Majority Makers" Program
- League of Conservation Voters
- NARAL Pro-Choice America
- Planned Parenthood Action Fund

Newspapers

- Las Vegas Sun
Danny Tarkanian (R)

Organizations

- National Republican Congressional Committee "Young Guns" Program
- National Right to Life Committee
- United States Chamber of Commerce

==== Debates ====
- Nevada 4th Congressional District Debate, October 11, 2012, C-SPAN

==== Polling ====
Poll source	Date(s) administered	Sample size	Margin of error	Danny Tarkanian (R)	Steven Horsford (D)	Other	Undecided
SurveyUSA	October 26–28, 2012	648	±3.9%	47%	42%	6%	5%
Tarrance (R-Tarkanian)	October 9–11, 2012	422	±5.0%	50%	40%	—	10%
SurveyUSA	September 18–20, 2012	646	±3.9%	45%	42%	6%	8%
Public Opinion Strategies (R-Tarkanian)	August 7–9, 2012	400	±4.9%	46%	35%	—	19%
Tarrance (R-Tarkanian)	June 26–28, 2012	400	±5.0%	47%	41%	–	12%

==== Predictions ====
Source	Ranking	As of
The Cook Political Report	Tossup	November 5, 2012
Rothenberg	Tossup	November 2, 2012
Roll Call	Tossup	November 4, 2012
Sabato's Crystal Ball	Lean D (flip)	November 5, 2012
NY Times	Lean D (flip)	November 4, 2012
RCP	Tossup	November 4, 2012
The Hill	Tossup	November 4, 2012

==== Results ====
Nevada's 4th congressional district, 2012
Party	Candidate	Votes	%
Democratic	Steven Horsford	120,501	50.1
Republican	Danny Tarkanian	101,261	42.1
Independent American	Floyd Fitzgibbons	9,389	3.9
Libertarian	Joseph P. Silvestri	9,341	3.9
Total votes		240,492	100.0
Democratic win (new seat)			
