= Mark E. Brown =

American businessman

Mark Brown
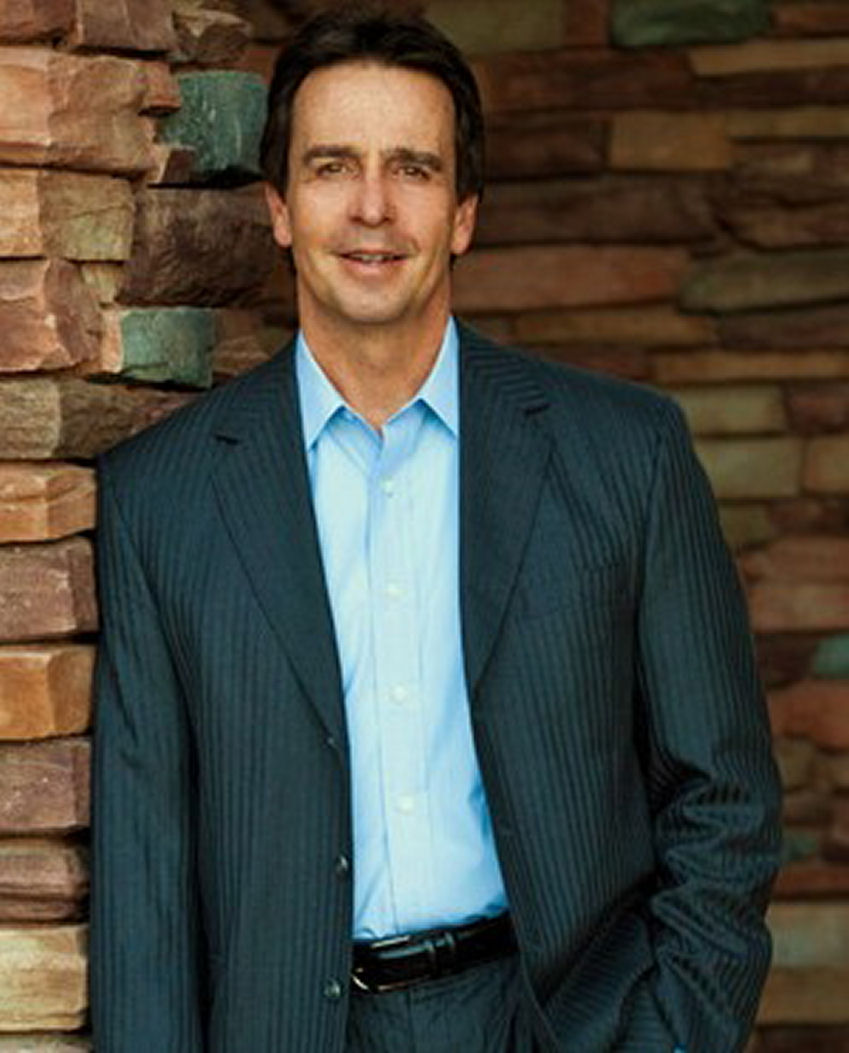
- Born: 1960 (age 65–66); Rogers, Arkansas, U.S.
- Education: University of Nevada, Reno; John Anderson Graduate School of Management
- Occupation: Chief Executive Officer of Miracle Flights
- Years active: 1983–present
- Website: http://miracleflights.org

Notes
- Best known for "What Happens in Vegas, Stays in Vegas" campaign

Mark E. Brown is an American entrepreneur and philanthropist. Brown is a chief executive officer of Miracle Flights, a national US charity, and a former executive vice president of The Howard Hughes Corporation. He is also the former Partner and President of R&R Partners, the ad agency which created the "What Happens in Vegas, Stays in Vegas" advertising campaign for the Las Vegas Convention and Visitors Authority. In addition, Brown was a founder and director of Service 1st Bank of Nevada, and previously served as the President of MBC Communications.

== Early biography ==
Brown attended University of Nevada, Reno where he studied Business Administration. He completed the Executive Program in Management for the John Anderson Graduate School of Management. Brown also attended Executive Program for Non-Profit Leaders at Stanford University.

Brown started out working as a senior legislative assistant on the staff of former Nevada Senator Chic Hecht. He spent five years in Washington, D.C. overseeing all of Hecht's U.S. Senate Banking and Energy Committee assignments in the 1980s.

== Career ==
In 1989, Mark Brown founded and operated Mark Brown Communications, a government affairs and public relations company which was later acquired by Burson-Marsteller. Following the acquisition he got a job as the Executive Vice President of corporate and government relations and marketing for The Howard Hughes Corporation and from 1994 to 1999, worked for the company, that is also an affiliate of The Rouse Company.

By 1999, Brown began to transition into the world of Las Vegas casino industry. In 1999–2001, he served as an Executive Vice President of government relations and corporate communications for Station casinos, Inc.

=== R&R Partners ===
Brown was the founder and owner of Brown & Partners which merged with R&R Partners in 2004. The merger helped bring $226 million in combined capital in 2005, when the merger became effective. After the merger Brown served as the company's president and CEO from 2004 to 2007.

The company R&R Partners, is best known for creating the advertising campaign slogan "What Happens in Vegas, Stays in Vegas" for the City of Las Vegas. Its "What happens here" slogan is not new, see What happens on tour, stays on tour, yet the campaign brought Las Vegas more popularity and the phrase has been used by many celebrities. In 2004 on The Tonight Show when Jay Leno asked Laura Bush whether she had gambled or had seen a Chippendales show while visiting the Las Vegas Strip, the then First Lady got a big hand by replying, "Jay, what happened in Vegas, stays in Vegas." In later years the phrase was used as the title for a 2008 movie What Happens in Vegas starring Cameron Diaz and Ashton Kutcher. It has also been used in the 2009 blockbuster hit The Hangover.

=== Other major corporate involvements ===
- Service 1st Bank of Nevada

Mark Brown was a founder and director of Service 1st Bank of Nevada from 2007 to 2010. The bank's capital was valued at the end of the first quarter of 2010 around $21 million and later bought by Western Liberty Bancorp and Forbes Lister Jason N. Ader the same year.

- YourBuyer Worldwide, Inc.

Brown also served as the President of YourBuyer Worldwide, Inc., a purchasing company, specializing in serving the hospitality, construction, and food packaging industries.

- Zen Gaming

In 2007, Brown started Zen Gaming, a holding company in Las Vegas, Nevada, serving online gambling industry. The same year Brown became the chief executive officer of Zen Gaming. In the early days of the company's development, Brown had to overcome the legal challenges related to the stricter US laws regarding online gambling. Later, the company developed and patented two new poker games, Royal hold 'em and No River Hold'em that have been approved by the Nevada Gaming Commission. Some of the Zen Gaming's partners included Stephens Media Group, owner of the Review-Journal, Golden Gaming, Lotus Broadcasting, a radio company that owns the local affiliates for ESPN Radio and Fox Sports Radio. Zen Gaming later made partnerships with the Ultimate Fighting Championship". The Zen Gaming's software platform was selected by Poker Productions, Inc. under a continuing agreement with NBCsports.com to provide poker programming. Poker Productions provides executive production services for the National Heads-Up Poker Championship and the Poker After Dark programs seen on NBC.

== Philanthropy and community involvement ==
- Miracle Flights

Since November, 2015, Mark Brown has served as CEO of the national nonprofit Miracle Flights, a charity established in 1985 in Las Vegas, Nevada, which provides free commercial air transportation to critically ill children and adults in need of special medical care. As of April, 2018, the non-profit organization provided a total of 116,569 free medical flights. The charity partners with a number of businesses and organizations including Southwest Airlines, Ronald McDonald House, Make-A-Wish Foundation, Delta Air Lines, United Airlines, Love Pop Greeting Cards and Ultimate Fighting Championship (UFC).

- In the past, Brown chaired the YMCA of Southern Nevada for 2 terms and was responsible for external fundraising. In July, 2018, Mark Brown was accepted into the Forbes Nonprofit Council, an organization for senior-level executives in successful nonprofit foundations. He is currently a member of the Board of Trustees of the UNLV Foundation and John F. Kennedy Center for the Performing Arts.
