= Rossi Ralenkotter =

American government official (1947–2025)

- Born: April 4, 1947; Covington, Kentucky, U.S.
- Died: October 10, 2025 (aged 78); Las Vegas, Nevada
- Education: Arizona State University
- Occupation: President and CEO, Las Vegas Convention and Visitors Authority
- Years active: 1973–2018

Rossi Ralenkotter (4 April 1947 – 10 October 2025) was an American promoter of tourism who spent 45 years working for, and ultimately leading, the Las Vegas Convention and Visitors Authority (LVCVA) where he promoted the city of Las Vegas as a tourist destination. Among other significant accomplishments, Ralenkotter was responsible for the development of the Las Vegas marketing slogan "What Happens Here, Stays Here".

== Early life and education ==
Ralenkotter was born April 4, 1947, in Covington, Kentucky, a Cincinnati suburb. When he was four, his parents moved to Las Vegas where his father was employed in the Las Vegas Sands as a craps dealer. After high school, where he excelled as a baseball player, Ralenkotter attended Arizona State University. After earning his undergraduate degree, he then went on to obtain a Master of Business Administration (MBA) at the University of Nevada, Las Vegas (UNLV).

== Career ==
After receiving his MBA, Ralenkotter was hired by the Las Vegas Convention Bureau, forerunner of the LVCVA, and was tasked with conducting the organization's first market research survey. He then developed the organization's annual Visitor Profile Survey, a valuable analytical tool still being used at the time of his death. Working his way up the ranks of the LVCVA, Ralenkotter was selected as the president and CEO in 2004, a position he held until his retirement in 2018. Prior to his selection as the LVCVA's senior official, Ralenkotter had worked tirelessly to broaden the city's appeal beyond gambling and was known for leading the effort that ultimately brought the National Finals Rodeo to Las Vegas. Ralenkotter also spearheaded the effort to bring the Consumer Electronics Show to the city.

Despite reluctance from professional sports leagues to place a team in a city that was widely considered to be the country's gambling capital, while serving as LVCVA's president, Ralenkotter successfully lobbied the National Hockey League to grant a franchise to the city. In 2017, the Las Vegas Knights made their debut as the city's first professional sports team. Subsequently, the National Football League and Major League Baseball both decided to award a franchise to Las Vegas.

During his time with the LVCVA, Las Vegas attracted a record 42.9 million visitors in 2016.

=== "What Happens Here, Stays Here" ===
In 2003, Ralenkotter directed R&R Partners to develop a new marketing campaign for the city and ultimately selected "What Happens Here, Stays Here" as the slogan. The phrase became an instant success and quickly entered the nation's pop culture lexicon. Speaking to the meaning of the slogan, Ralenkotter said that it represented a level of "adult freedom", claiming that "People come to Las Vegas to have a good time and not worry about anything."

=== Misuse of gift cards ===
Ralenkotter resigned from his position in 2018 in the midst of an ethics scandal centered on his misuse of $17,000 worth of gift cards. Although he denied any wrongdoing, he pleaded guilty to a misdemeanor charge and paid back the value of the cards to the LVCVA and also paid a $25,000 fine to the state of Nevada. During an interview, just before his death, Ralenokotter said the LVCVA authority had worked hard with airlines to expand services to Las Vegas and that the airlines would often provide complimentary tickets to LVCVA employees. “So, you work with the airline table. There were times, from time to time, you go to one of their lunches or whatever, there’d be a card for flights, you know ... I probably should have looked into a little bit more.”

Despite his resignation under a cloud of scandal, he received a $455,000 severance package when the LVCVA voted to approve his retirement. At the time of his retirement, his salary was nearly $1 million annually.

== Personal life and accolades ==
Ralenkotter married Mary Jo (Casey) Ralenkotter in 1989 and together they raised five children from previous marriages. At the time of his death, he was survived by his wife, their children and 10 grandchildren.

Ralenkotter's distinguished career resulted in numerous accolades, including the American Marketing Association's Lifetime Achievement Award in 1993, and the Travel and Tourism Research Association Lifetime Achievement Award in 1996. In 2008, he received recognition as a UNLV "Outstanding Alumnus". In 2014, the U.S. Travel Association elected Ralenkotter to its Hall of Fame Leaders and, in recognition of his efforts to bring professional sports to Las Vegas, in 2018 Ralenkotter was inducted into the Southern Nevada Sports Hall of Fame.

== Death and legacy ==
On October 10, 2025, Ralenkotter died after a 16-year bout with cancer. R&R Partners CEO, Billy Vassiliadis, described Ralenkotter as a traditionalist: a devout Catholic, good family man and, ironically, not a gambler. "He was a walking, talking contradiction, personality-wise: fairly conventional as a human being, but as a professional, very open to new ideas."

Upon his death, Las Vegas Mayor Shelley Berkley said in a statement, "He was a Las Vegas original and contributed greatly to the growth of the meeting and convention business – and had the vision to expand the convention center -- at a time when people thought it would never work in Las Vegas, I am honored to have known him and am grateful for his service to our community."

After his death, Geoff Freeman, president and CEO of the U.S. Travel Association said, “Rossi Ralenkotter changed the game. His audacious, data-driven marketing campaigns raised the bar for destinations around the globe. His warmth and kindness made him a trusted partner not just to his colleagues in Las Vegas, but to travel professionals from coast to coast.”
