= Yurek (surname) =

Yurek is a surname. Notable people with the surname include:

- Jeff Yurek (born 1971), Canadian politician in Ontario
- Toby Yurek, American politician in Nevada
