= Athens of Texas =

The Athens of Texas is a nickname that has been coined to describe several cities in Texas, United States, including:

- Marshall, Texas
- Sherman, Texas
- Waco, Texas

== See also ==
- Athens, Texas, a city in Northeast Texas
