= 2022 United States House of Representatives elections in Nevada =

- November 8, 2022

All 4 Nevada seats to the United States House of Representatives
	Majority party	Minority party
Party	Democratic	Republican
Last election	3	1
Seats won	3	1
Seat change	Steady	Steady
Popular vote	480,774	515,535
Percentage	47.62%	51.07%
Swing	▼1.47%	▲4.31%

Democratic
50–60%
Republican
50–60%
60–70%
70–80%
80–90%

The 2022 United States House of Representatives elections in Nevada were held on November 8, 2022, to elect the four U.S. representatives from the state of Nevada, one from each of the state's four congressional districts. The elections coincided with the Nevada gubernatorial election, as well as other elections to the U.S. House of Representatives, elections to the U.S. Senate, and various state and local elections.

Nevada was one of two states in which the party that won the state's popular vote did not win a majority of seats in 2022, the other state being Pennsylvania.

== Redistricting ==
Nevada's congressional districts, 2023-2033

The Nevada Legislature drew new maps for Nevada's congressional districts to account for the new 2020 census data. The Democratic Party controlled the whole redistricting process at the time. Legislators drew the maps for the state in late 2021. The maps that were eventually passed were criticized as partisan gerrymanders.

== Overview ==
=== District ===
District	Democratic		Republican		Others		Total		Result
District	Votes	%	Votes	%	Votes	%	Votes	%	Result
District 1	115,700	51.57%	103,115	45.96%	5,534	2.47%	224,349	100.00%	Democratic hold
District 2	117,371	37.80%	185,467	59.73%	7,660	2.47%	310,498	100.00%	Republican hold
District 3	131,086	51.98%	121,083	48.02%	0	0.00%	252,169	100.00%	Democratic hold
District 4	116,617	52.42%	105,870	47.58%	0	0.00%	222,487	100.00%	Democratic hold
Total	480,774	47.62%	515,535	51.07%	13,194	1.31%	1,009,503	100.00%	

Popular Vote
Republican	51.07%
Democratic	47.62%
Other	1.31%

House Seats
Democratic	75.00%
Republican	25.00%

=== County ===
County	Democratic		Republican		Others		Margin		Total votes cast
County	#	%	#	%	#	%	#	%	Total votes cast
Carson City	8,865	37.56%	14,136	59.89%	602	2.55%	-5,271	-22.33%	23,603
Churchill	1,931	19.70%	7,536	76.87%	336	3.43%	-5,605	-57.18%	9,803
Clark	356,006	51.48%	330,068	47.72%	5,534	0.80%	25,938	3.75%	691,608
Douglas	7,897	27.28%	20,490	70.77%	566	1.95%	-12,593	-43.49%	28,953
Elko	2,759	17.16%	12,679	78.84%	643	4.00%	-9,920	-61.69%	16,081
Esmeralda	73	16.70%	364	83.30%	643	4.00%	-291	-66.59%	437
Eureka	55	7.04%	700	89.63%	26	3.33%	-645	-82.59%	781
Humboldt	1,044	17.21%	4,844	79.83%	180	2.97%	-3,800	-62.62%	6,068
Lander	295	13.47%	1,784	81.46%	111	5.07%	-1,489	-67.99%	2,190
Lincoln	334	15.66%	1,799	84.34%	0	0.00%	-1,465	-68.68%	2,133
Lyon	5,392	22.99%	17,290	73.71%	776	3.31%	-11,898	-50.72%	23,458
Mineral	678	36.39%	1,185	63.61%	0	0.00%	−507	−27.21%	1,863
Nye	6,275	30.38%	14,377	69.62%	0	0.00%	−8,102	−39.23%	20,652
Pershing	337	19.10%	1,366	77.44%	61	3.46%	-1,029	-58.33%	1,764
Storey	605	23.74%	1,859	72.96%	84	3.30%	-1,254	-49.22%	2,548
Washoe	87,626	45.63%	100,244	52.20%	4,154	2.16%	-12,618	-6.57%	192,024
White Pine	602	17.61%	2,696	78.85%	121	3.54%	-2,094	-61.25%	3,419
Totals	480,774	47.62%	515,535	51.07%	13,194	1.31%	34,761	3.44%	1,009,503

== District 1 ==
2022 Nevada's 1st congressional district election
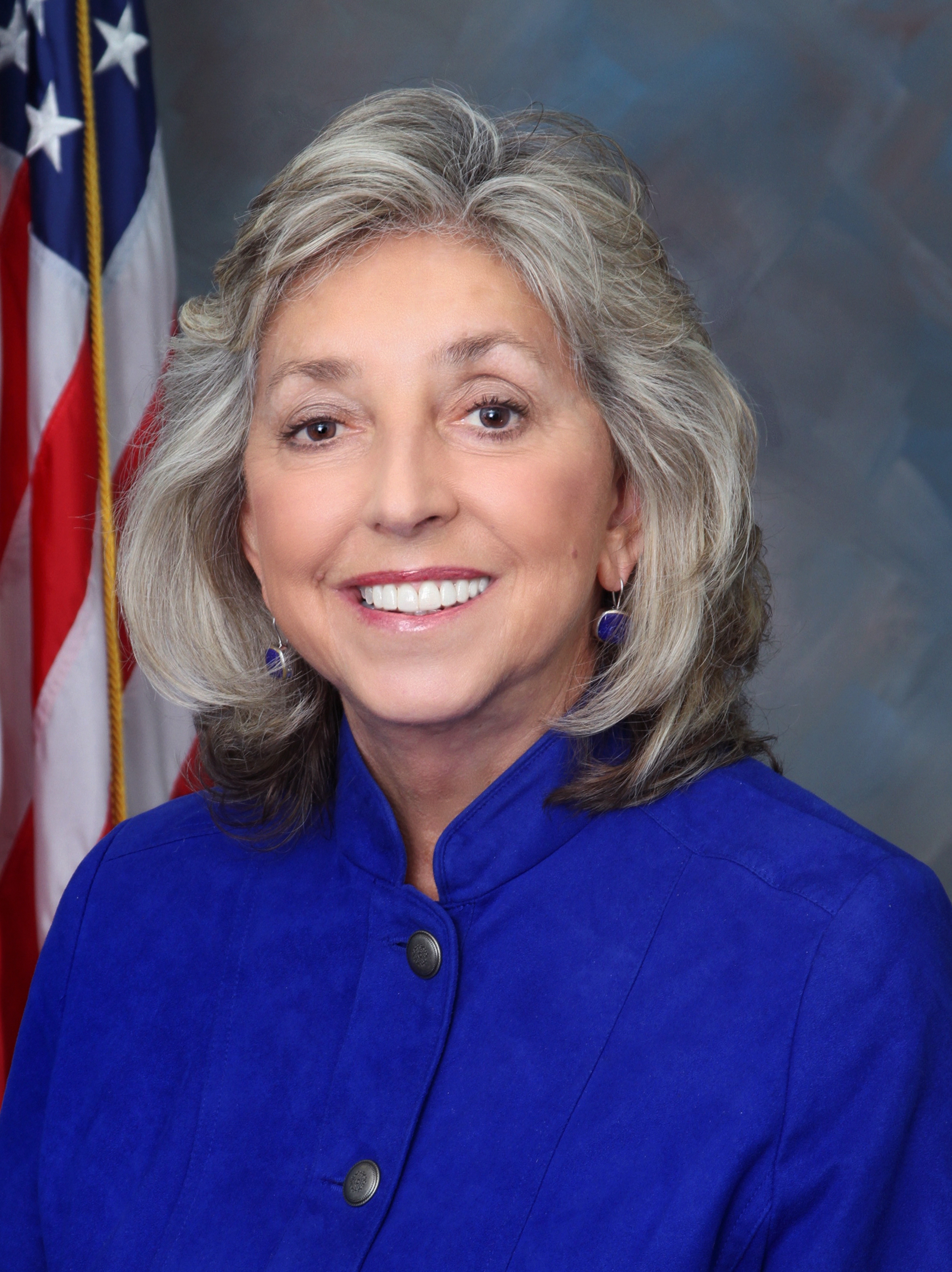

Nominee	Dina Titus	Mark Robertson
Party	Democratic	Republican
Popular vote	115,700	103,115
Percentage	51.6%	46.0%
- Precinct results Titus: 40–50% 50–60% 60–70% 70–80% >90% Robertson: 40–50% 50–60% 60–70% 70–80% 80–90% >90% Tie: 40–50% 50% No votes
U.S. Representative before election
Dina Titus
Democratic
Elected U.S. Representative
Dina Titus
Democratic

The incumbent was Democrat Dina Titus, who was re-elected with 61.8% of the vote in 2020. Following redistricting, the 1st district expanded from inner Las Vegas towards its southeastern suburbs and some rural parts of Clark County, taking in the cities of Henderson and Boulder City.

=== Democratic primary ===
==== Candidates ====
===== Nominee =====
- Dina Titus, incumbent U.S. representative

===== Eliminated in primary =====
- Amy Vilela, universal healthcare activist and candidate for Nevada's 4th congressional district in 2018

==== Endorsements ====
Dina Titus

Organizations

- AIPAC
- Democratic Majority for Israel
- Feminist Majority PAC
- Giffords
- Humane Society of the United States Legislative Fund
- League of Conservation Voters
- NARAL Pro-Choice America
- National Women's Political Caucus
- Planned Parenthood Action Fund
- Pro-Israel America
- Sierra Club

Newspapers

- Las Vegas Sun

Labor unions

- Culinary Workers Union
- National Education Association
- Nevada AFL–CIO
- United Auto Workers
Amy Vilela

U.S. senators

- Bernie Sanders, Vermont (2007–present) (Independent)

U.S. representatives

- Cori Bush, MO-01 (2021–present)

State legislators

- Nina Turner, president of Our Revolution, former Ohio state senator (2008–2014), former Cleveland city councilor (2006–2008), and national co-chair of the Bernie Sanders 2020 presidential campaign

Organizations

- Brand New Congress
- Center for Biological Diversity Action Fund
- Jewish Voice for Peace Action Fund
- Our Revolution
- Sunrise Movement Las Vegas

==== Results ====
Democratic primary results
Party	Candidate	Votes	%
Democratic	Dina Titus (incumbent)	33,565	79.8
Democratic	Amy Vilela	8,482	20.2
Total votes		42,047	100.0

=== Republican primary ===
==== Candidates ====
===== Nominee =====
- Mark Robertson, retired U.S. Army colonel and professor

===== Eliminated in primary =====
- Jane Adams, businesswoman
- David Brog, political organizer
- Cresent Hardy, former U.S. representative for Nevada's 4th congressional district (2015–2017)
- Carolina Serrano, Hispanic outreach coordinator for Donald Trump's 2020 presidential campaign in Nevada
- Morgun Sholty, businessman
- Cynthia Steel, former judge for the Nevada 8th Judicial District Court
- Jessie Turner, podcaster

==== Endorsements ====
David Brog

U.S. executive branch officials

- Mike Pompeo, former secretary of state (2018–2021)

==== Results ====
Republican primary results
Party	Candidate	Votes	%
Republican	Mark Robertson	12,375	30.1
Republican	David Brog	7,226	17.6
Republican	Carolina Serrano	7,050	17.1
Republican	Cresent Hardy	4,790	11.6
Republican	Cynthia Steel	4,782	11.6
Republican	Jane Adams	2,081	5.1
Republican	Morgun Sholty	1,998	4.9
Republican	Jessie Turner	845	2.0
Total votes		41,147	100.0

=== Libertarian primary ===
==== Candidates ====
===== Nominee =====
- Ken Cavanaugh

=== General election ===
==== Predictions ====
Source	Ranking	As of
The Cook Political Report	Tossup	May 26, 2022
Inside Elections	Tilt D	August 25, 2022
Sabato's Crystal Ball	Lean D	November 17, 2021
Politico	Lean D	April 5, 2022
RCP	Lean R (flip)	November 6, 2022
Fox News	Tossup	July 11, 2022
DDHQ	Tossup	November 2, 2022
538	Tossup	November 1, 2022
The Economist	Tossup	November 2, 2022

==== Polling ====
Poll source	Date(s) administered	Sample size (Note: Key: A – all adults RV – registered voters LV – likely voters V – unclear)	Margin of error	Dina Titus (D)	Mark Robertson (R)	Other	Undecided
Emerson College	October 26–29, 2022	480 (LV)	± 4.4%	42%	54%	3% (Note: Cavanaugh (L) with 3%)	1%
Siena College/The New York Times	October 19–21, 2022	399 (LV)	–	47%	47%	–	6%
Emerson College	July 7–10, 2022	500 (RV)	± 4.3%	41%	37%	5%	17%

==== Results ====
2022 Nevada's 1st congressional district election
Party	Candidate	Votes	%
Democratic	Dina Titus (incumbent)	115,700	51.6
Republican	Mark Robertson	103,115	46.0
Libertarian	Ken Cavanaugh	5,534	2.5
Total votes		224,349	100.0
Democratic hold			

==== By county ====
County	Dina Titus Democratic		Mark Robertson Republican		Ken Cavanaugh Libertarian		Margin		Total votes cast
County	#	%	#	%	#	%	#	%	Total votes cast
Clark (part)	115,700	51.57%	103,115	45.96%	5,534	2.47%	12,585	5.61%	224,349
Totals	115,700	51.57%	103,115	45.96%	5,534	2.47%	12,585	5.61%	224,349

== District 2 ==
2022 Nevada's 2nd congressional district election
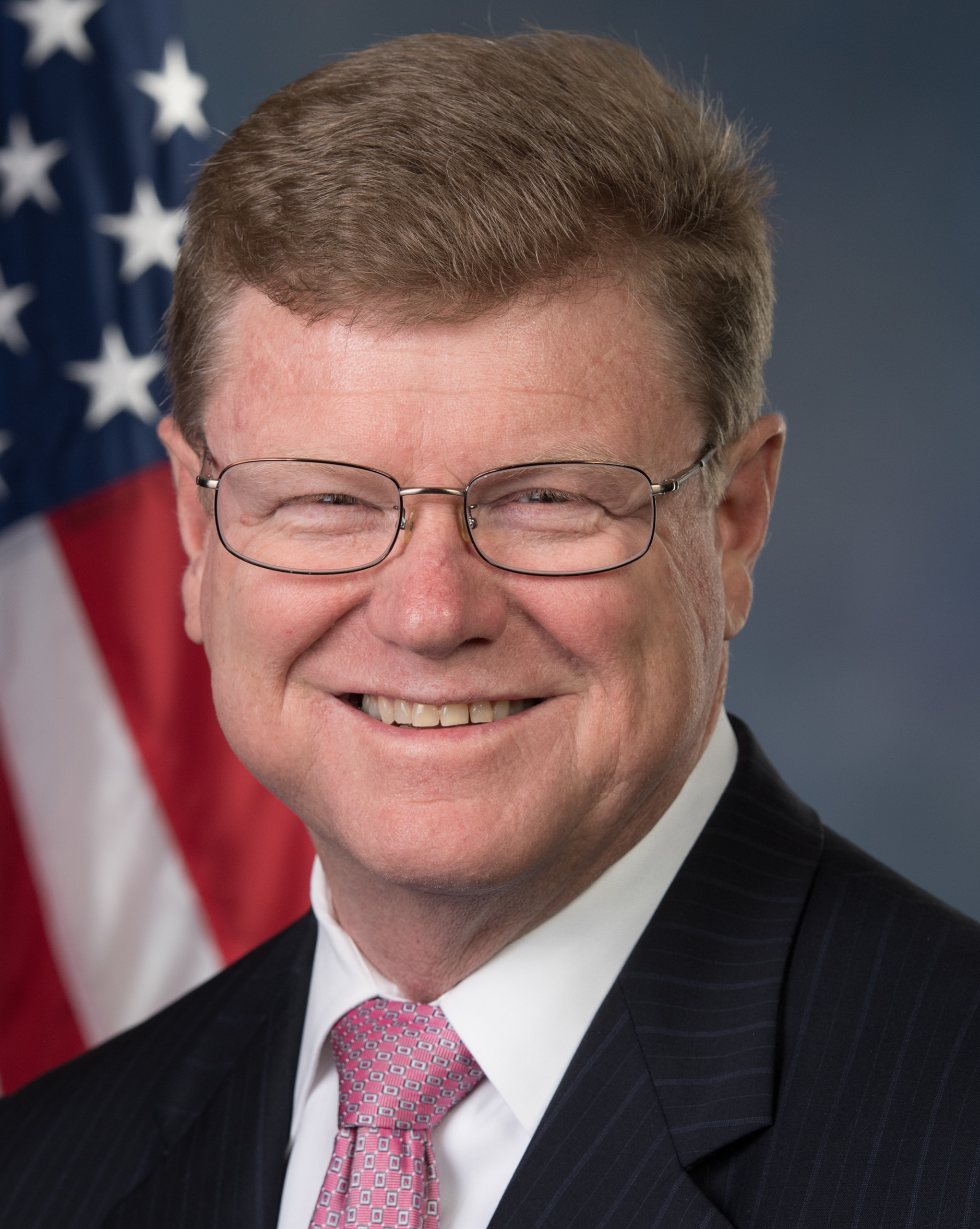

Nominee	Mark Amodei	Elizabeth Krause
Party	Republican	Democratic
Popular vote	185,467	117,371
Percentage	59.7%	37.8%
- Amodei: 40–50% 50–60% 60–70% 70–80% 80–90% >90% Krause: 40–50% 50–60% 60–70% 70–80% 80–90% Tie: 40–50% 50% No votes
U.S. Representative before election
Mark Amodei
Republican
Elected U.S. Representative
Mark Amodei
Republican

The incumbent was Republican Mark Amodei, who was re-elected with 56.5% of the vote in 2020. Following redistricting, the 2nd district was expanded to include White Pine County and more of Lyon County, and includes the cities of Reno, Sparks, and Carson City.

=== Republican primary ===
==== Candidates ====
===== Nominee =====
- Mark Amodei, incumbent U.S. representative

===== Eliminated in primary =====
- Joel Beck, U.S. Air Force veteran and candidate for this seat in 2018 and 2020
- Brian Nadell, professional poker player and candidate for Nevada's 3rd congressional district in 2020
- Catherine Sampson
- Danny Tarkanian, Douglas County commissioner, son of Jerry Tarkanian, and perennial candidate

==== Results ====
2022 GOP primary results by county: 40–50% Amodei 50–60% Amodei

Republican primary results
Party	Candidate	Votes	%
Republican	Mark Amodei (incumbent)	49,779	54.9
Republican	Danny Tarkanian	29,563	32.6
Republican	Joel Beck	6,744	7.4
Republican	Catherine Sampson	3,010	3.3
Republican	Brian Nadell	1,614	1.8
Total votes		90,710	100.0

=== Democratic primary ===
==== Candidates ====
===== Nominee =====
- Elizabeth Mercedes Krause, teacher

===== Eliminated in primary =====
- Joseph Afzal, accountant and financial analyst
- Michael Doucette, teacher
- Gerold Gorman, former broadcaster, software industry and teacher
- Tim Hanifan, former congressional intern
- Brian Hansen, slot manager
- Rahul Joshi, teacher

===== Withdrawn =====
- Aaron Sims, candidate for mayor of Carson City in 2020 (running for state senate)

==== Results ====
Democratic primary results
Party	Candidate	Votes	%
Democratic	Elizabeth Mercedes Krause	22,072	49.0
Democratic	Tim Hanifan	6,440	14.3
Democratic	Michael Doucette	5,478	12.2
Democratic	Rahul Joshi	3,613	8.0
Democratic	Brian Hansen	3,276	7.3
Democratic	Joseph Afzal	3,117	6.9
Democratic	Gerald Gorman	1,034	2.3
Total votes		45,030	100.0

=== Independents and other parties ===
==== Candidates ====
===== Declared =====
- Darryl Baber (Libertarian)
- Russell Best, nominee for governor in 2018 (Independent American)

=== General election ===
==== Predictions ====
Source	Ranking	As of
The Cook Political Report	Solid R	November 18, 2021
Inside Elections	Solid R	December 3, 2021
Sabato's Crystal Ball	Safe R	November 17, 2021
Politico	Solid R	November 7, 2022
RCP	Safe R	June 9, 2022
Fox News	Solid R	July 11, 2022
DDHQ	Solid R	July 20, 2022
538	Solid R	June 30, 2022
The Economist	Safe R	September 28, 2022

==== Polling ====
Poll source	Date(s) administered	Sample size	Margin of error	Mark Amodei (R)	Elizabeth Krause (D)	Other	Undecided
Emerson College	October 26–29, 2022	530 (LV)	± 4.2%	59%	33%	4% (Note: Best (IAP) with 3%; Baber (L) with 1%)	4%
Emerson College	July 7–10, 2022	500 (RV)	± 4.3%	46%	36%	10%	8%

==== Results ====
2022 Nevada's 2nd congressional district election
Party	Candidate	Votes	%
Republican	Mark Amodei (incumbent)	185,467	59.7
Democratic	Elizabeth Mercedes Krause	117,371	37.8
Independent American	Russell Best	4,194	1.4
Libertarian	Darryl Baber	3,466	1.1
Total votes		310,498	100.0
Republican hold			

==== By county ====
County	Mark Amodei Republican		Elizabeth Mercedes Krause Democratic		Various candidates Other parties		Margin		Total
County	#	%	#	%	#	%	#	%	Total
Carson City	14,136	59.89%	8,865	37.56%	602	2.55%	5,271	22.33%	23,603
Churchill	7,536	76.87%	1,931	19.70%	336	3.43%	5,605	57.18%	9,803
Douglas	20,490	70.77%	7,897	27.28%	566	1.95%	12,593	43.49%	28,953
Elko	12,679	78.84%	2,759	17.16%	643	4.00%	9,920	61.69%	16,081
Eureka	700	89.63%	55	7.04%	26	3.33%	645	82.59%	781
Humboldt	4,844	79.83%	1,044	17.21%	180	2.97%	3,800	62.62%	6,068
Lander	1,784	81.46%	295	13.47%	111	5.07%	1,489	67.99%	2,190
Lyon (part)	17,133	73.65%	5,355	23.02%	776	3.34%	11,778	50.63%	23,264
Pershing	1,366	77.44%	337	19.10%	61	3.46%	1,029	58.33%	1,764
Storey	1,859	72.96%	605	23.74%	84	3.30%	1,254	49.22%	2,548
Washoe	100,244	52.20%	87,626	45.63%	4,154	2.16%	12,618	6.57%	192,024
White Pine	2,696	78.85%	602	17.61%	121	3.54%	2,094	61.25%	3,419
Totals	185,467	59.73%	117,371	37.80%	7,660	2.47%	68,096	21.93%	310,498

== District 3 ==
2022 Nevada's 3rd congressional district election
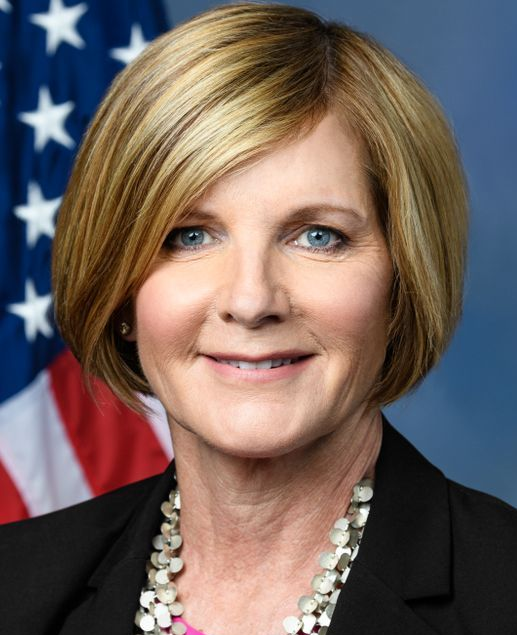

Nominee	Susie Lee	April Becker
Party	Democratic	Republican
Popular vote	131,086	121,083
Percentage	52.0%	48.0%
- Precinct results Lee: 50–60% 60–70% 70–80% 80–90% >90% Becker: 50–60% 60–70% 70–80% 80–90% >90% Tie: 50% No votes
U.S. Representative before election
Susie Lee
Democratic
Elected U.S. Representative
Susie Lee
Democratic

The incumbent was Democrat Susie Lee, who was re-elected with 48.8% of the vote in 2020. Following redistricting, the 3rd district expanded into much of the inner 1st district; it now comprises the western Las Vegas suburbs, including Spring Valley, Summerlin South, and Sandy Valley.

=== Democratic primary ===
==== Candidates ====
===== Nominee =====
- Susie Lee, incumbent U.S. representative

===== Eliminated in primary =====
- Randy Hynes, cloud programmer

==== Endorsements ====
Susie Lee

Organizations

- American Israel Public Affairs Committee
- EMILY's List
- Feminist Majority PAC
- Giffords
- Humane Society of the United States Legislative Fund
- Jewish Democratic Council of America
- League of Conservation Voters
- NARAL Pro-Choice America
- Natural Resources Defense Council
- Planned Parenthood Action Fund
- Pro-Israel America
- Sierra Club

Newspapers

- Las Vegas Sun

Labor unions

- Culinary Workers Union
- National Education Association
- Nevada AFL–CIO
- United Auto Workers

==== Results ====
Democratic primary results
Party	Candidate	Votes	%
Democratic	Susie Lee (incumbent)	37,069	89.7
Democratic	Randy Hynes	4,265	10.3
Total votes		41,334	100.0

=== Republican primary ===
==== Candidates ====
===== Nominee =====
- April Becker, attorney and nominee for Nevada's 6th Senate district in 2020

===== Eliminated in primary =====
- Clark Bossert
- Albert Goldberg, real estate broker
- John Kovacs, construction company owner
- Noah Malgeri, veteran

===== Withdrew =====
- Reinier Prijten, financial manager and candidate for New Jersey's 11th congressional district in 2020

==== Endorsements ====
April Becker

U.S. executive branch officials

- Nikki Haley, former U.S. Ambassador to the United Nations (2017–2018) and former governor of South Carolina (2011–2017)

U.S. representatives

- Kevin McCarthy, House Minority Leader (2019–present) and U.S. representative for California's 23rd congressional district (2007–present)
- Elise Stefanik, U.S. representative for New York's 21st congressional district (2015–present)

Statewide officials

- Adam Laxalt, former Nevada Attorney General (2015–2019)

Organizations

- Maggie's List
- Nevada Republican Party
- Susan B. Anthony List
Noah Malgeri

U.S. representatives

- Paul Gosar, U.S. representative for Arizona's 4th congressional district (2011–present)

State legislators

- Anthony Sabatini, Florida state representative from the 32nd district (2018–present)

Local officials

- Bruce L. Woodbury, former Clark County commissioner (1981–2009)

Individuals

- Roger Stone, conservative political consultant and lobbyist

==== Results ====
Republican primary results
Party	Candidate	Votes	%
Republican	April Becker	28,260	64.9
Republican	John Kovacs	4,857	11.2
Republican	Clark Bossert	4,553	10.4
Republican	Noah Malgeri	3,981	9.1
Republican	Albert Goldberg	1,920	4.4
Total votes		43,571	100.0

=== General election ===
==== Endorsements ====
April Becker (R)

U.S. representatives

- Burgess Owens, U.S. representative for Utah's 4th congressional district (2021–present)

Statewide officials

- Robert List, former governor of Nevada (1979-1983) and Attorney General of Nevada (1971-1979)

Newspapers

- Las Vegas Review-Journal
Susie Lee (D)

Organizations

- United States Chamber of Commerce

Labor unions

- United Mine Workers

==== Predictions ====
Source	Ranking	As of
The Cook Political Report	Tossup	April 20, 2022
Inside Elections	Tilt D	May 20, 2022
Sabato's Crystal Ball	Lean R (flip)	November 7, 2022
Politico	Tossup	April 5, 2022
RCP	Lean R (flip)	October 30, 2022
Fox News	Lean R (flip)	November 1, 2022
DDHQ	Tossup	November 2, 2022
538	Lean D	October 14, 2022
The Economist	Tossup	November 2, 2022

==== Polling ====
Graphical summary

Poll source	Date(s) administered	Sample size	Margin of error	Susie Lee (D)	April Becker (R)	Other	Undecided
Emerson College	October 26–29, 2022	510 (LV)	± 4.3%	47%	52%	–	1%
RMG Research	July 23–29, 2022	400 (LV)	± 4.9%	41%	44%	–	11%
Emerson College	July 7–10, 2022	500 (RV)	± 4.3%	42%	40%	5%	13%
The Tarrance Group (R) (Note: Poll sponsored jointly by the National Republican Congressional Committee and Becker's campaign committee)	June 20–23, 2022	400 (LV)	± 4.9%	44%	46%	–	9%

==== Results ====
2022 Nevada's 3rd congressional district election
Party	Candidate	Votes	%
Democratic	Susie Lee (incumbent)	131,086	52.0
Republican	April Becker	121,083	48.0
Total votes		252,169	100.0
Democratic hold			

==== By county ====
County	Susie Lee Democratic		April Becker Republican		Margin		Total votes cast
County	#	%	#	%	#	%	Total votes cast
Clark (part)	131,086	51.98%	121,083	48.02%	10,003	3.97%	252,169
Totals	131,086	51.98%	121,083	48.02%	10,003	3.97%	252,169

== District 4 ==
2022 Nevada's 4th congressional district election
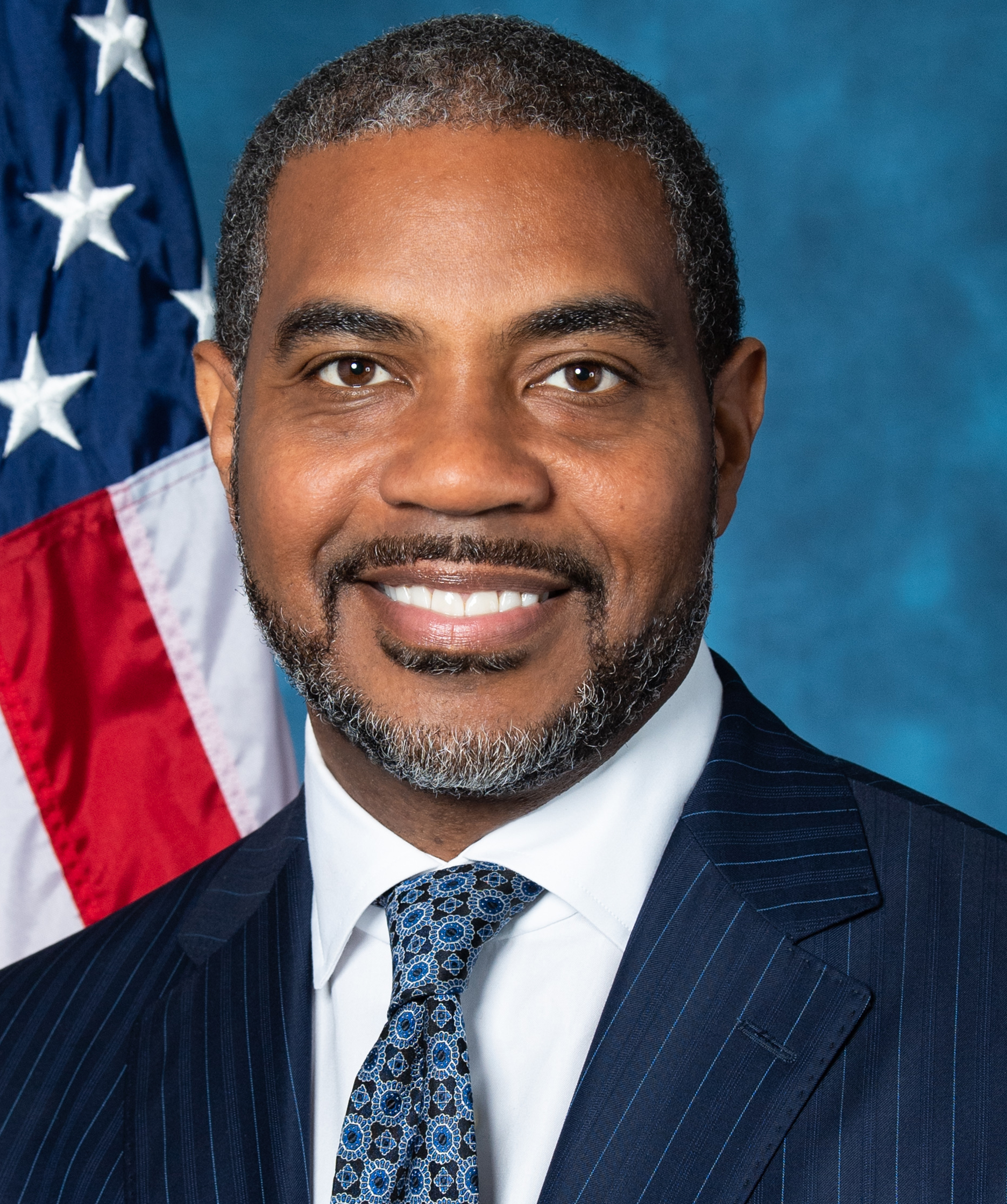

Nominee	Steven Horsford	Sam Peters
Party	Democratic	Republican
Popular vote	116,617	105,870
Percentage	52.4%	47.6%
- Horsford: 50–60% 60–70% 70–80% 80–90% >90% Peters: 50–60% 60–70% 70–80% 80–90% >90% Tie: 50% No votes
U.S. Representative before election
Steven Horsford
Democratic
Elected U.S. Representative
Steven Horsford
Democratic

The incumbent was Democrat Steven Horsford, who was re-elected with 50.7% of the vote in 2020. Following redistricting, the 4th district now covers parts of northern Las Vegas, taking in the Las Vegas Strip, as well as its northern suburbs and rural central Nevada.

During the campaign, a research firm contracted by the Democratic Congressional Campaign Committee inappropriately obtained the military records of candidate Sam Peters.

=== Democratic primary ===
==== Candidates ====
===== Nominee =====
- Steven Horsford, incumbent U.S. representative

==== Endorsements ====
Steven Horsford

Organizations

- American Israel Public Affairs Committee
- Giffords
- Humane Society of the United States Legislative Fund
- Jewish Democratic Council of America
- League of Conservation Voters
- NARAL Pro-Choice America
- Natural Resources Defense Council
- Planned Parenthood Action Fund
- Sierra Club

Newspapers

- Las Vegas Sun

Labor unions

- Culinary Workers Union
- National Education Association
- Nevada AFL–CIO
- United Auto Workers

=== Republican primary ===
==== Candidates ====
===== Nominee =====
- Sam Peters, U.S. Air Force veteran and candidate for Nevada's 4th congressional district in 2020

===== Eliminated in primary =====
- Annie Black, state assemblywoman from the 19th district
- Chance Bonaventura, chief of staff for Michelle Fiore, a Las Vegas city councilwoman

==== Endorsements ====
Sam Peters

U.S. representatives

- Andy Biggs, U.S. representative for Arizona's 5th congressional district (2017–present)
- Paul Gosar, U.S. representative for Arizona's 4th congressional district (2011–present)

Statewide officials

- Robert List, former governor of Nevada (1979–1983) and former Nevada Attorney General (1971–1979)

Individuals

- Sid Miller, Texas Commissioner of Agriculture (2015–present)
- Ted Nugent, musician and activist

Organizations

- National Federation of Independent Business (post-primary)
- Nevada Republican Party

==== Polling ====
Poll source	Date(s) administered	Sample size	Margin of error	Annie Black	Chance Bonaventura	Sam Peters	Undecided
WPA Intelligence (R) (Note: This poll was sponsored by Peters's campaign)	Late March 2022	404 (LV)	± 4.9%	14%	5%	33%	48%

==== Results ====
Republican primary results
Party	Candidate	Votes	%
Republican	Sam Peters	20,956	47.7
Republican	Annie Black	18,249	41.5
Republican	Chance Bonaventura	4,748	10.8
Total votes		43,953	100.0

=== General election ===
==== Debate ====
2022 Nevada's 4th congressional district debate
No.	Date	Host	Moderator	Link	Democratic	Republican
Key: P Participant A Absent N Not invited I Invited W Withdrawn						
Key: P Participant A Absent N Not invited I Invited W Withdrawn					Steven Horsford	Sam Peters
1	Oct. 11, 2022	KLVX; KNPR	Amber Dixon; Joe Schoenmann		P	P

==== Predictions ====
Source	Ranking	As of
The Cook Political Report	Lean D	October 5, 2022
Inside Elections	Lean D	May 20, 2022
Sabato's Crystal Ball	Lean D	November 17, 2021
Politico	Lean D	November 7, 2022
RCP	Tossup	June 9, 2022
Fox News	Tossup	July 11, 2022
DDHQ	Lean D	November 2, 2022
538	Likely D	September 29, 2022
The Economist	Likely D	November 7, 2022

==== Polling ====
Poll source	Date(s) administered	Sample size	Margin of error	Steven Horsford (D)	Sam Peters (R)	Other	Undecided
Emerson College	October 26–29, 2022	480 (LV)	± 4.4%	51%	48%	–	1%
RMG Research	August 2–8, 2022	400 (LV)	± 4.9%	43%	43%	4%	10%
Emerson College	July 7–10, 2022	500 (RV)	± 4.3%	42%	39%	5%	15%

==== Results ====
2022 Nevada's 4th congressional district election
Party	Candidate	Votes	%
Democratic	Steven Horsford (incumbent)	116,617	52.4
Republican	Sam Peters	105,870	47.6
Total votes		222,487	100.0
Democratic hold			

==== By county ====
County	Steven Horsford Democratic		Sam Peters Republican		Margin		Total
County	#	%	#	%	#	%	Total
Clark (part)	109,220	55.38%	87,988	44.62%	21,232	10.77%	197,208
Esmeralda	73	16.70%	364	83.30%	−291	−66.59%	437
Lincoln	334	15.66%	1,799	84.34%	−1,465	−68.68%	2,133
Lyon (part)	37	19.07%	157	80.93%	−120	−61.86%	194
Mineral	678	36.39%	1,185	63.61%	−507	−27.21%	1,863
Nye	6,275	30.38%	14,377	69.62%	−8,102	−39.23%	20,652
Totals	116,617	52.42%	105,870	47.58%	10,747	4.83%	222,487

== See also ==
- Elections in Nevada
- Political party strength in Nevada
- Nevada Democratic Party
- Nevada Republican Party
- Government of Nevada
- 2022 United States Senate election in Nevada
- 2022 Nevada gubernatorial election
- 2022 Nevada lieutenant gubernatorial election
- 2022 Nevada Senate election
- 2022 Nevada Assembly election
- 2022 Nevada elections
- 2022 United States gubernatorial elections
- 2022 United States elections

== Notes ==
Partisan clients
