= Annie Black =

American politician from Nevada

Member of the Nevada Assembly from the 19th district
- In office November 4, 2020 – November 9, 2022
- Preceded by: Chris Edwards
- Succeeded by: Toby Yurek

Personal details
- Born: Ann Marie Black; January 20, 1981 (age 45) Las Vegas, Nevada, U.S.
- Party: Republican
- Children: 2
- Website: Campaign website

Ann Marie "Annie" Black-Guedry (born January 20, 1981) is an American politician. She served as a Republican member of the Nevada Assembly.

== Biography ==
A realtor since graduating high school, Black sought election to the Nevada Assembly in 2010 and was a candidate for chair of the Nevada Republican Party in 2019. In 2018, she was elected to the Mesquite City Council.

In 2020, Black challenged Assemblyman Chris Edwards in the Republican primary. Black accused Edwards of being insufficiently fiscally conservative, while Edwards criticized Black's political inexperience. Black defeated Edwards in the primary by 61% to 39% and was elected unopposed in the general election, as the Democratic Party did not nominate a candidate.

During the 2021 United States Capitol attack, Black marched from the White House to the United States Capitol, where she said she saw men on megaphones urging the pro-Trump mob to storm the Capitol security barrier. Black said she retreated to avoid being associated with the mob and denied participating in the violence that followed, saying she left the scene when the rioters breached a security barrier, and told the Associated Press that "We all had a choice when that fence came down. Whether it was our group that incited that to happen or another group, every single person had the choice to make." Black later falsely claimed that "antifa" groups precipitated the violence.

On May 20, 2021, Black was censured by the Nevada Assembly for removing her mask on the Assembly floor in violation of house rules. The Assembly had required all legislators to wear masks indoors unless vaccinated; after refusing to disclose her vaccination status, Black was stripped of her ability to vote or speak on the floor.

On January 4, 2022, Black declared her intention to run in the Republican primary for Nevada's 4th congressional district. Sam Peters, an insurance agent, advanced from the Republican primary to the general election.
