= Steven Horsford =

American politician (born 1973)

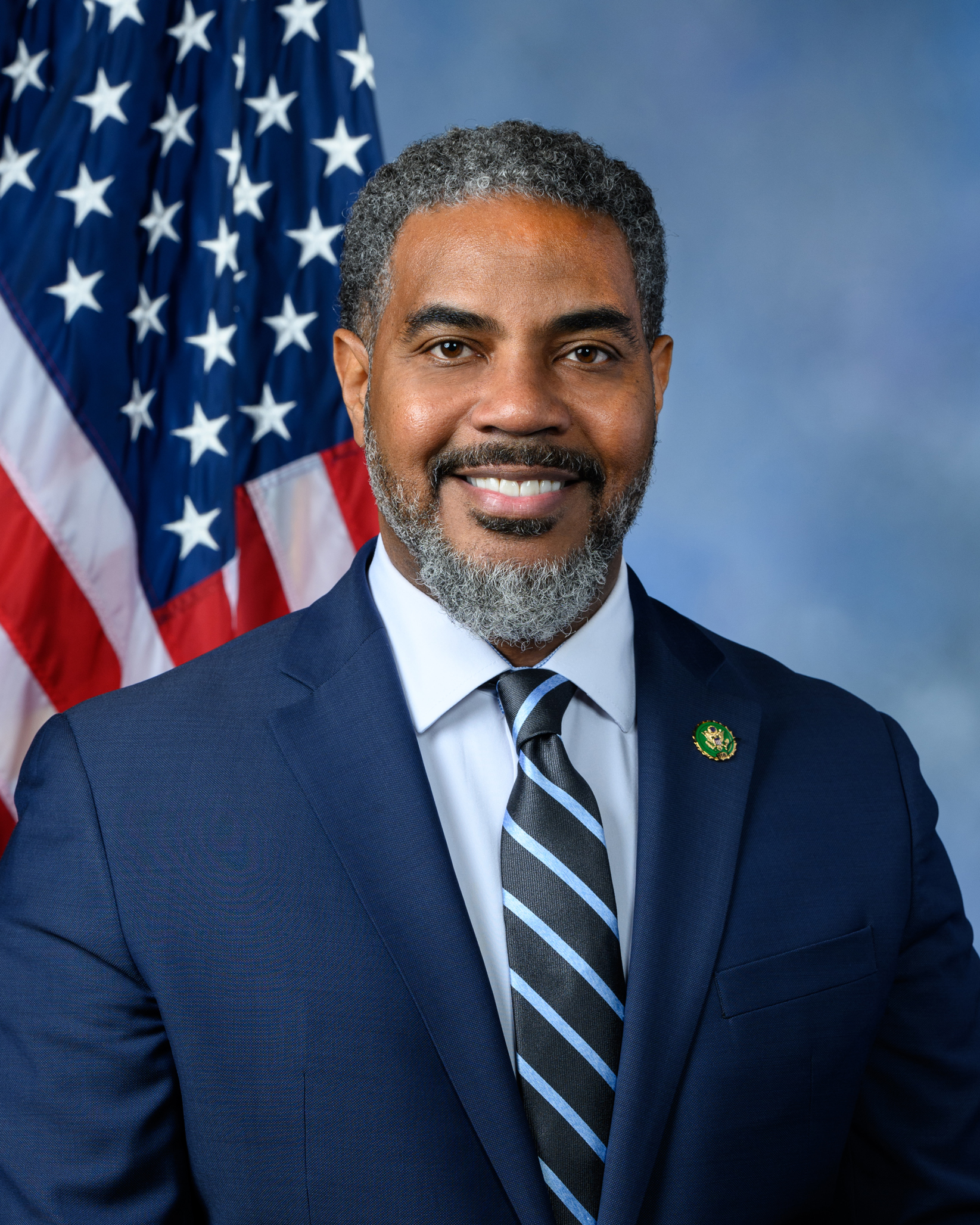
- Official portrait, 2023

Chair of the Congressional Black Caucus
- In office January 3, 2023 – January 3, 2025
- Preceded by: Joyce Beatty
- Succeeded by: Yvette Clarke

Member of the U.S. House of Representatives from Nevada's 4th district
- Incumbent
- Assumed office January 3, 2019
- Preceded by: Ruben Kihuen
- In office January 3, 2013 – January 3, 2015
- Preceded by: Constituency established
- Succeeded by: Cresent Hardy

Majority Leader of the Nevada State Senate
- In office February 9, 2009 – January 3, 2013
- Preceded by: William Raggio
- Succeeded by: Mo Denis

Member of the Nevada State Senate from the 4th district
- In office February 7, 2005 – January 3, 2013
- Preceded by: Joe Neal
- Succeeded by: Kelvin Atkinson

Personal details
- Born: Steven Alexzander Horsford; April 29, 1973 (age 53) Las Vegas, Nevada, U.S.
- Party: Democratic
- Spouse: Sonya Douglass (m. 2000; sep. 2022)
- Children: 3
- Education: University of Nevada, Reno (BA)
- Website: House website Campaign website
- Horsford's voice Horsford on the Justice Department probe into the death of Breonna Taylor. Recorded March 10, 2023.

Steven Alexzander Horsford (born April 29, 1973) is an American politician and businessman serving as the U.S. representative for Nevada's 4th congressional district since 2019, previously holding the position from 2013 to 2015. He also served as chair of the Congressional Black Caucus from 2023 to 2025. A member of the Democratic Party, he served in the Nevada State Senate, representing the 4th district, in Clark County, from 2005 to 2013. Horsford was the first African American to serve as Majority Leader (2009–2013) and the first African American to represent Nevada in Congress. He lost to Republican nominee Cresent Hardy in 2014.

After that election, Horsford joined an international Las Vegas-based business and marketing consulting firm, R&R Partners, for which he had worked before his political career. In January 2018, he announced that he would run for the open seat vacated by Democrat Ruben Kihuen in the midterm elections. In November 2018, he defeated former U.S. Representative Cresent Hardy in a rematch of their 2014 race.

== Early life and education ==
Horsford was born and raised in Las Vegas, Nevada. His mother, Pamela Horsford, came to the U.S. from Trinidad in her teens and gave birth to him when she was 17. While attending Ed W. Clark High School in Las Vegas, Horsford worked at Pizza Hut and at a veterinarian's office, where he cleaned kennels after hours.

When Horsford was 19, his father, Gary Shelton, was killed. One report states that Shelton "was shot and killed at work by a man who had tried to rob the store" in North Las Vegas at which he worked as a cook, while another report says he "was killed in a drug incident". After his father's death, Horsford temporarily returned home from the University of Nevada, Reno, where he had been studying political science and communications. He returned to college the next year. Horsford received a degree from the University of Nevada, Reno, in 2014.

== Business career ==
Horsford was CEO of the Culinary Training Academy, a job training program. He also served on the Southern Nevada Workforce Investment Board. In 1996, he began working at R&R Partners in Las Vegas.

== Nevada Senate ==
=== Elections ===
In 2004, incumbent Democratic State Senator Joe Neal, from Clark County's 4th Senate district, decided to retire to run for a seat on the Clark County Commission. Horsford ran and defeated Republican Mabel Florence Lucier, 72%–28%. He became the fourth African American to serve as a Nevada state senator. In 2008, he was reelected to a second term with 74% of the vote.

=== Tenure ===
Horsford served in six special sessions and four regular sessions of the Nevada legislature. In February 2009, he became Nevada Senate majority leader. At age 35, he was the youngest person to ever lead the chamber and was the first African American. In August 2011, Horsford appointed Senator Mo Denis to lead the caucus election efforts for the 2012 election cycle.

He led the Democratic majority thorough the Great Recession, when state funding levels dropped by 44 percent below the amount needed to fund 2007 service levels. He championed a clean energy jobs initiative, sponsoring Senate Bill 152, announcing a plan to use stimulus funds to train Nevadans for jobs in renewable energy in an attempt to position the state as a leader in the "green economy."

During his time in the legislature, Horsford drew criticism on two occasions related to fundraising. In 2010, he apologized for a letter from his PAC that solicited donations in exchange for private meetings with Democratic legislative leaders, which critics characterized as "pay to play." After the criticism, he apologized and discontinued the program. In 2011, he was among dozens of Nevada lawmakers who accepted a trip to the Bahamas funded by web poker company PokerStars ahead of legislation affecting the online gaming industry. He later returned the contributions.

In November 2009, a Las Vegas television station caught Horsford illegally parking his SUV in a handicapped parking space at a park for six hours. Horsford apologized, saying, "There was no excuse. It should have never happened." He said that he had made a donation to a nonprofit group in the amount that he would have been fined had he been caught by law enforcement.

=== Committee assignments ===
In his last session in the Nevada Senate, he served as chair of the Senate Finance Committee and also served on the Senate Committee on Revenue and the Senate Committee on Legislative Operations and Elections.

== U.S. House of Representatives ==
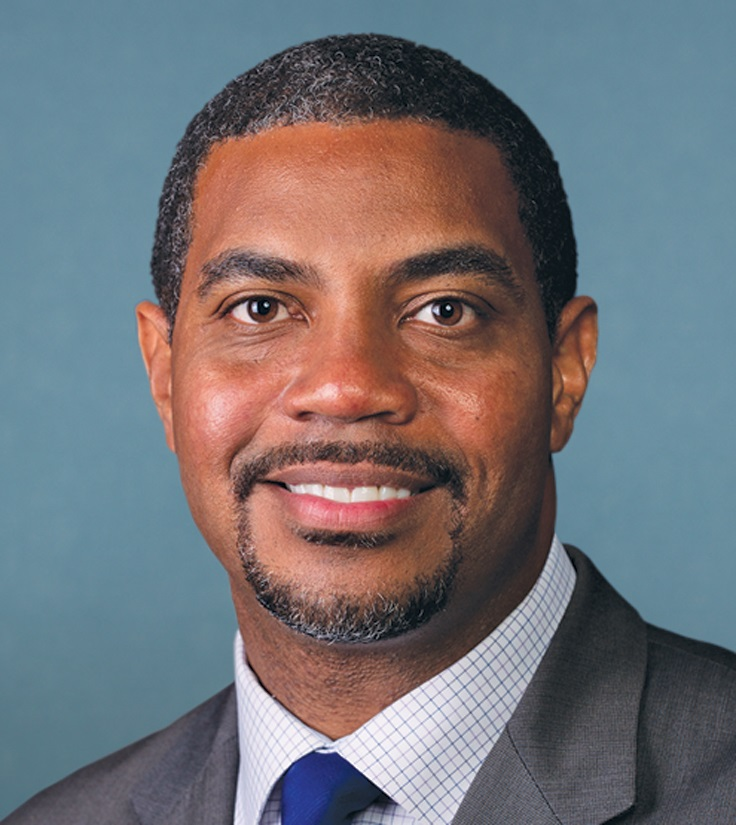
Horsford during the 113th Congress

=== Elections ===
==== 2012 ====
In October 2011, Horsford announced he would run for Congress, but did not know at the time which district he would run in because the Nevada legislature had not finished the redistricting maps. He decided to run in the newly created 4th congressional district, which includes the northern portion of Clark County as well as all or part of the rural counties of Lincoln, White Pine, Nye, Esmeralda, Mineral and Douglas.

Horsford was due to face former state Assemblyman John Jay Lee in the Democratic primary, but Lee dropped out in November, effectively handing Horsford the nomination. He defeated Republican businessman Danny Tarkanian in November, 50%–42%. Tarkanian won the district's rural counties by margins of better than 2-to-1, but Horsford carried Clark County, home to four-fifths of the district's voters, by 28,800 votes.

==== 2014 ====
Horsford was narrowly defeated by Republican state Assemblyman Cresent Hardy. Hardy would also go on to lose reelection after a single term.

==== 2018 ====
Horsford announced in January 2018 that he would run to replace retiring incumbent Ruben Kihuen in Nevada's 4th congressional district. Kihuen declined to run for a second term after sexual harassment allegations. Horsford won the June Democratic primary, defeating Pat Spearman and Amy Vilela, and defeated Republican nominee Cresent Hardy again in the general election. He was sworn in on January 3, 2019.

==== 2020 ====
Horsford ran for reelection against Republican former state Assemblyman Jim Marchant. In the November general election, Horsford defeated Marchant by five points.

==== 2022 ====
Horsford won reelection in 2022. He ran unopposed in the Democratic primary.

Horsford's wife, Sonya, expressed displeasure that Horsford was running for reelection despite having admitted to a decade-long affair with a former college student and intern, saying, "This election cycle, I will not be silent" and "We just want to heal and live the amazing lives we've been destined to live, free of lies, manipulation, and unbridled ambition."

Horsford defeated Republican Sam Peters by a margin of about 5%.

==== 2024 ====
Horsford won reelection in 2024. He ran unopposed in the Democratic primary. Horsford defeated John Lee, former mayor of North Las Vegas by a margin of about 8%.

==== 2026 ====
Horsford is the current Democratic nominee in District 4. He faces the Republican nominee Cody Whipple, a small business owner. House race ratings classify the race as "Likely Democratic."

=== Tenure ===
Horsford took office for his first two-year term on January 3, 2013, and after losing re-election in 2014, he returned to the House in 2019. He is a member of the House Progressive Caucus, and was the only caucus member to support the September 30, 2013, continuing resolution that contained a one-year delay of the Affordable Care Act's individual mandate. He sits on the Committee on Ways and Means.

=== Chair of the Congressional Black Caucus ===
Horsford speaking as outgoing chair at the Congressional Black Caucus ceremonial swearing-in for the 119th Congress

In December 2022, Horsford was elected as the 28th chair of the Congressional Black Caucus (CBC), becoming the first Nevadan to lead the group. He succeeded Joyce Beatty and served for the duration of the 118th Congress, from January 2023 to 2025. He built his chairmanship around what he called a "Black Wealth Agenda," which was aimed at narrowing the racial wealth gap. He helped to launch an economic opportunity tour during the Biden campaign in 2024 with Vice President Kamala Harris.

=== Committee assignments ===
For the 119th Congress:

- Committee on Ways and Means
  - Subcommittee on Health
  - Subcommittee on Social Security

=== Caucus memberships ===
- Congressional Black Caucus (chair)
- Black Maternal Health Caucus
- Congressional Equality Caucus
- Congressional Progressive Caucus
- Congressional Ukraine Caucus
- New Democrat Coalition
- Problem Solvers Caucus
- House Pro-Choice Caucus
- Congressional Caucus for the Equal Rights Amendment

== Political positions ==
He is a member of the House Progressive Caucus. Horsford voted with President Joe Biden's stated position 100% of the time in the 117th Congress, according to a FiveThirtyEight analysis.

=== Trade ===
As a member of the Ways and Means Committee, Horsford has been a critic of President Donald Trump's 2025 tariffs. During an April 2025 committee hearing, he sharply questioned U.S. Trade Representative Jamieson Greer after Trump announced a 90-day tariff pause partway through the testimony, accusing him of having no plan and not understanding the President's actions around tariff policy in advance. Horsford has framed the tariffs as a threat to Nevada's tourism and gaming economy, framing a decline in potential international travel as "very, very troubling" and saying that the tariffs had already cost the state billions of dollars.

=== Economy and taxes ===
Horsford opposed the One Big Beautiful Bill Act, which was the 2025 Republican tax and spending law. He argued that it permanently cut taxes for the wealthy, derided the bill as a "tax scam law" and criticized the provision which removed the ability for gamblers to write off their losses on taxes, noting concerns that it could hurt Nevada's gaming industry. Horsford also described concerns that the "no tax on tips" provision in the bill as written wasn't permanent, and proposed a failed amendment to make the deduction permanent.

=== Immigration ===
Horsford was an original co-sponsor of H.R.15, which would have created a pathway to citizenship for undocumented immigrants. He has said that Congress needed to address immigration as a whole, not just young people living in the country illegally. He said increased border security with Mexico and Canada was needed, but that a southern border wall would not solve the immigration problem.

=== Health care ===
Horsford "sees healthcare as a right, not a privilege". He believes that all Americans should have health care of the sort veterans and senior citizens receive. Horsford described his view of health care as being influenced by the six-way heart bypass surgery he had when doctors found a severe blockage in his arteries just months into his first term in 2013. He favors building on the Affordable Care Act rather than adopting a single-payer Medicare for All system.

=== Gun control ===
Horsford's support for gun control legislation is rooted partly in the killing of his father, who was shot and killed when Horsford was 19. He supports a gun control package that would include background checks, a ban on assault weapon and bump stocks, and closing the gun show loophole, an increase in mental-health funding and programs to address bullying in schools. Asked in May 2018 about gun confiscation, he said, "I believe we have to be very careful under the Second Amendment not to take away someone's right, but to be clear, assault rifles and weapons of war are not the same as other forms of weapons, and we need to be very careful and make a clear distinction."

=== Federal lands ===
During his first term in Congress, Horsford worked on "an agreement that allowed for the designation of the Tule Springs Fossil Beds National Monument and the designation of about 50,000 acres of wilderness in north-central Nevada." He does not support the transfer of federal land in Nevada to state control, saying, "Nevada hasn't been able to properly fund education. How is it going to be able to manage 87 percent of public lands that are now currently managed by BLM, Forest Service and wildlife? Let's be realistic about our priorities and let's continue being partners."

=== Foreign policy ===
The congressman has argued that we "do not want another prolonged conflict overseas" in reference to the 2026 Iran war, and has expressed condolences to families who had family members die in the fighting.

Horsford has described the controversy about the relocation of the U.S. Embassy to Jerusalem as "a distraction away from the important international issues we are right now faced with." In 2025, Horsford joined 44 Democratic and 198 Republican representatives to pass the Illegitimate Court Counteraction Act. The Act, in response to the International Criminal Court (ICC) issuing warrants for Israeli officials, would impose sanctions on ICC officials who attempt to investigate, arrest, detain, or prosecute any protected person of the U.S. or its allies. In 2026, he voted in favor of Thomas Massie's amendment to eliminate all regularly appropriated US assistance to Israel. He stated that he continued to support Israel's right to exist and defend itself, but that Congress must ensure assistance to Israel is consistent with American law.

=== Minimum wage ===
Horsford supports an increase in the federal minimum wage. In March 2014, as part of a "constituent outreach effort", he went undercover to help a UPS driver deliver packages, partly "to get a from-the-ground perspective of the working man and woman in Las Vegas" and partly "to argue for raising the federal minimum wage from $7.25 per hour to $10.10."

=== Reparations ===
Horsford is a sponsor of H.R. 40, the Commission to Study and Develop Reparation Proposals for African Americans Act. The bill would set up a reparations commission for those with enslaved ancestors.

=== Impeachments of President Trump and Pete Hegseth ===
Horsford voted to impeach President Donald Trump in both 2019 and 2021. After the January 6 Capitol attack, he was the first member of Nevada's congressional delegation to call for Trump's impeachment.

On November 10, 2026, Horsford missed the House vote on the impeachment of Pete Hegseth as Secretary of Defense. Horsford claimed that a personal emergency prevented him from voting.

== Other political activities ==
=== 2008 presidential election ===
Horsford was active in arranging for Nevada to host the second national presidential caucus in 2008. He was an early supporter of Barack Obama's candidacy, co-chairing Obama's campaign in the state.

=== National committees ===
Horsford was the national vice chairman of the Democratic Legislative Campaign Committee and served as the Democratic National Committeeman for the State of Nevada. He is a member of the Democratic National Committee's Change Commission and its Rules & Bylaws Committee.

=== Career between House terms ===
In April 2015, Horsford resumed working at R&R Partners. As an officer there, he oversaw an effort to help MGM Resorts International ensure that it kept its word to officials in Prince George's County, Maryland, that at least half of the workforce for the MGM National Harbor in Maryland would be made up of residents of that county and that the MGM National Harbor would contract with minority-owned firms.

== Personal life ==
Horsford married Sonya Douglass, a professor of educational leadership at Teachers College, Columbia University, in 2000. They have three children. They are divorced as of 2022.

Horsford had six-way open heart bypass surgery in 2013 to treat a hereditary condition.

In May 2020, Horsford stated that he had an extramarital affair from 2009 to 2010 and 2017 to 2019.

== See also ==
- List of African-American United States representatives

Nevada Senate
Preceded by William Raggio	Majority Leader of the Nevada Senate; 2009–2013	Succeeded by Mo Denis
U.S. House of Representatives
New constituency	Member of the U.S. House of Representatives from Nevada's 4th congressional district 2013–2015	Succeeded by Cresent Hardy
Preceded by Ruben Kihuen	Member of the U.S. House of Representatives from Nevada's 4th congressional district 2019–present	Incumbent
Preceded by Joyce Beatty	Chair of the Congressional Black Caucus; 2023–2025	Succeeded by Yvette Clarke
U.S. order of precedence (ceremonial)
Preceded by Mary Gay Scanlon	United States representatives by seniority 187th	Succeeded by Tom Suozzi
