= List of city nicknames in the United States =

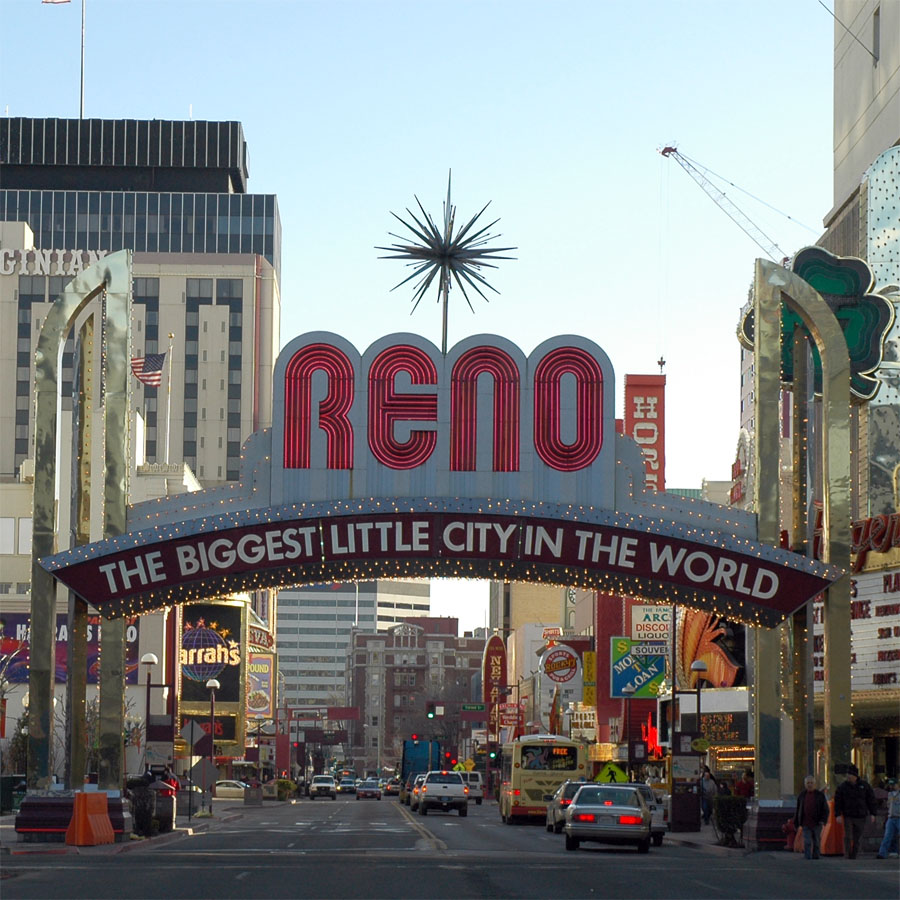
Reno, Nevada proudly displays its nickname as "The Biggest Little City in the World" on a large sign above a downtown street.

This partial list of city nicknames in the United States compiles the aliases, sobriquets and slogans that cities are known by (or have been known by historically), officially and unofficially, to municipal governments, local people, outsiders or their tourism boards or chambers of commerce.

City nicknames can help establish a civic identity, help outsiders recognize a community, attract people to a community because of its nickname, promote civic pride, and build community unity. Nicknames and slogans that successfully create a new community "ideology or myth" are also believed to have economic value. This value is difficult to measure, but there are anecdotal reports of cities that have achieved substantial economic benefits by "branding" themselves by adopting new slogans.

In 2005 the consultancy Tagline Guru conducted a small survey of professionals in the fields of branding, marketing, and advertising aimed at identifying the "best" U.S. city slogans and nicknames. Participants were asked to evaluate about 800 nicknames and 400 slogans, considering several criteria in their assessments. The assigned criteria were: whether the nickname or slogan expresses the "brand character, affinity, style, and personality" of the city, whether it "tells a story in a clever, fun, and memorable way," uniqueness and originality, and whether it "inspires you to visit there, live there, or learn more."

The top-ranked nickname in the survey was New York City's "The Big Apple" followed by "Sin City" (Las Vegas), "The Big Easy" (New Orleans), "Motor City" (Detroit), and "The Windy City" (Chicago). In addition to the number-two nickname, Las Vegas had the top-rated slogan: "What Happens Here, Stays Here." The second- through fifth-place slogans were "So Very Virginia" (Charlottesville, Virginia), "Always Turned On" (Atlantic City, New Jersey), "Cleveland Rocks!" (Cleveland, Ohio), and "The Sweetest Place on Earth" (Hershey, Pennsylvania).

Some unofficial nicknames are positive, while others are derisive. The unofficial nicknames listed here have been in use for a long time or have gained wide currency.

== See also ==
- Banana belt
- List of U.S. state nicknames
- Tree City USA
- List of city nicknames and slogans in Canada
- List of adjectivals and demonyms for cities

General:

- Lists of nicknames on Wikipedia
