= Sonya Douglass =

American academic

- Spouse: Steven Horsford (m. 2000; sep. 2022)
- Children: 3

Academic background
- Education: Colorado State University; University of Nevada, Las Vegas
- Thesis: Vestiges of desegregation: Black superintendent reflections on the complex legacy of Brown v Board of Education (2007)

Academic work
- Institutions: University of Nevada, Las Vegas; George Mason University; Teachers College, Columbia University
- Website: sonyadouglass.com

Sonya Douglass (formerly Horsford) is an American academic who researches educational inequality in the United States, social justice, and education policy. Douglass is a professor of educational leadership at the Teachers College, Columbia University.

== Life ==
In 1997, Douglass completed a B.A. in communications and journalism, cum laude, at Colorado State University. She earned a M.P.A. (2002) and Ed.D. in educational leadership (2007) at University of Nevada, Las Vegas (UNLV). Her dissertation was titled Vestiges of desegregation: Black superintendent reflections on the complex legacy of Brown v Board of Education. Douglass's doctoral advisor was Edith A. Rusch.

Douglass researches educational inequality in the United States, social justice, and education policy. At UNLV, She was an assistant professor in the department of educational leadership at UNLV from 2008 to 2010 and a senior resident scholar of education from 2011 to 2013. From 2013 to 2016, Douglass was an associate professor in the graduate school of education at George Mason University. In 2016, Douglass joined the faculty at the Teachers College, Columbia University as an associate professor in the educational leadership program. In 2017, she became the Teachers College founding director of the Black Education Research Collective and co-director of the urban education leaders program. She became a full professor in the fall of 2021.

== Personal life ==
Douglass married politician Steven Horsford in 2000. They have three children. Douglass filed for divorce in 2022. Horsford had previously admitted to having an affair with a woman 15 years his junior starting when she was a 21-year-old college senior.

== Selected works ==
- Horsford, Sonya Douglass, ed. (2010). New Perspectives in Educational Leadership Exploring Social, Political, and Community Contexts and Meaning. Peter Lang. ISBN 978-1-4331-0746-7. OCLC 724101771.
- Horsford, Sonya Douglass (2011). Learning in a Burning House: Educational Inequality, Ideology, and (Dis)Integration. Teachers College Press. ISBN 978-0-8077-5177-0. OCLC 1150212045.
- Wilson, Camille M.; Horsford, Sonya Douglass, eds. (2013). Advancing Equity and Achievement in America's Diverse Schools: Inclusive Theories, Policies, and Practices. Routledge. ISBN 978-1-136-20213-1.
- Horsford, Sonya Douglass; Tillman, Linda C., eds. (2016). Intersectional Identities and Educational Leadership of Black Women in the USA. Routledge. ISBN 978-1-134-91331-2.
- Horsford, Sonya Douglass; Scott, Janelle T.; Anderson, Gary L. (2018). The Politics of Education Policy in an Era of Inequality: Possibilities for Democratic Schooling. Routledge. ISBN 978-1-317-39791-5.
