= Toby Yurek =

American politician

Member of the Nevada Assembly from the 19th district
- In office November 9, 2022 – October 6, 2025
- Preceded by: Annie Black
- Succeeded by: Jason Patchett

Personal details
- Party: Republican
- Education: Hope International University (BA); Boston University (MS); University of Nevada, Las Vegas (JD)

Thaddeus “Toby” Yurek III is an American politician and a former member of the Nevada State Assembly. A Republican, he represented the 19th district, which covers parts of Clark County. He resigned in October 2025 in order to assume a position in the administration of governor Joe Lombardo.

== Personal life ==
He was born Thaddeus Yurek III in Anchorage, Alaska. He lived in the San Fernando Valley for most of his childhood, graduating from Valley High School in 1991. He was a former police officer for the Henderson Police Department as well as a lawyer. He is a Christian.

== Education ==
He graduated from Hope International University with a B.A. in Church Growth with Emphasis in Preaching. He later received a M.S. in Criminal Justice from Boston University. He received a J.D. at the University of Nevada, Las Vegas, William S. Boyd School of Law.
