= What happens on tour, stays on tour =

Phrase that means that all exploits during the tour must be kept strictly confidential

"What happens on tour, stays on tour" is a phrase or saying agreed to by persons who get together and travel either domestically or overseas for sporting tours. In essence, the phrase means that all exploits during the tour must be kept strictly confidential, never to be discussed with anyone outside the group. In more recent years, the phrase has also been applied to persons attending music gigs, going on business trips and fishing holidays. The term is commonly used in the United Kingdom, Ireland, Australia, New Zealand, South Africa, Canada and the United States and is also known as "what goes on tour stays on tour", "what happens on the road stays on the road", and among members of the United States military, speaking of temporary duty assignment, "what happens TDY stays TDY".

== Background ==
The phrase has been described by Samantha Brett, a writer for The Age, as an "unspoken male pact that for centuries can never be broken". In essence, if you were there you may discuss the events, but if you were not there, you get nothing. In contrast, Rugby for Dummies describes the phrase as meaning that particularly funny, embarrassing, or debauched moments are for consumption only by the tourists themselves and not casual listeners back home.

It is believed that the phrase originated in 1970 during an overseas rugby union trip, and quickly cascaded into many other sporting codes such as cricket and football. The phrase has subsequently evolved into a "code of honour" amongst those males participating in the trip or tour. Many groups or teams travelling interstate or overseas have adopted the phrase, that mainly relates to sexual conquests and binge drinking. However, the phrase can also relate to other forms of unacceptable behaviour and etiquette.

It has been stated that there are two rules embedded in the code. Firstly, it must be a group of males in team environment, travelling away from home, where they are unconstrained from the usual forms of acceptable behaviour. The second rule is that all exploits must be kept strictly confidential, never to be discussed with anyone outside the group, particularly wives and girlfriends (also known as WAGs).

The phrase however, is not restricted to males. Australian Hockeyroo player Sarah Taylor when asked what her most memorable thing to ever happen whilst away on tour responded, "What goes on tour stays on tour". Anna Coogan, a writer for the Evening Herald in Ireland, stated that the code of honour also applied to women as much as men.

=== "What happens on the road..." ===
In the United States, the term has close connotations among touring musicians and their road crews and is expressed as "what happens on the road, stays on the road". American singer Mike Doughty listed the concept as number four of his "Rules of the Road", and the reason he wasn't going to tell stories of debauchery, drug abuse, and sexual exploits. Other musicians who have expressed the term include Jimmy Gnecco, Andrew Schwab, and Jes Steinegar of Coalesce. Author Trev Wilkins wrote in his gigging and touring guide that the concept "is a kind of unwritten rule", and that the professional gigger should never "destroy the trust" of coworkers by telling tales of their "crazy and out-of-character" activities. Wilkins emphasized that it was easy to ruin not only another's career but one's own, when the trust of gigging companions disappears.

=== "What happens in Vegas..." ===
American heavy-metal musician Tommy Lee wrote in 2005 that the phrase "what happens on the road stays on the road" was "an old saying that's been said many ways" and he expressed his view that its origin lay in rock concert touring by writing "Las Vegas stole that shit from us...". Lee was referring to the catch phrase "what happens in Vegas, stays in Vegas", which was in common circulation before Billy Crystal used it to close the 76th Academy Awards show in 2004 and was spoken variously by people such as Laura Bush and Ben Affleck on television broadcasts.

== See also ==
- Bro Code
- Casual sex
- Circumlocution
- Cover-up
- Hookup culture
- Gentlemen's agreement
- One-night stand
- Social norm
- Whitewashing (censorship)
