= Cynthia Dianne Steel =

Retired Nevada judge

Cynthia Dianne Steel is a retired family judge who served the eight district of Nevada from 1997 until her retirement on January 8, 2019. She was the most senior judge in the district court at the time of her retirement. She helped establish One Family, One Judge.

== See also ==
- List of female state supreme court justices
- List of first women lawyers and judges in Nevada
