= Las Vegas Convention and Visitors Authority =

Tourism agency for Las Vegas

- Las Vegas Convention and Visitors Authority logo

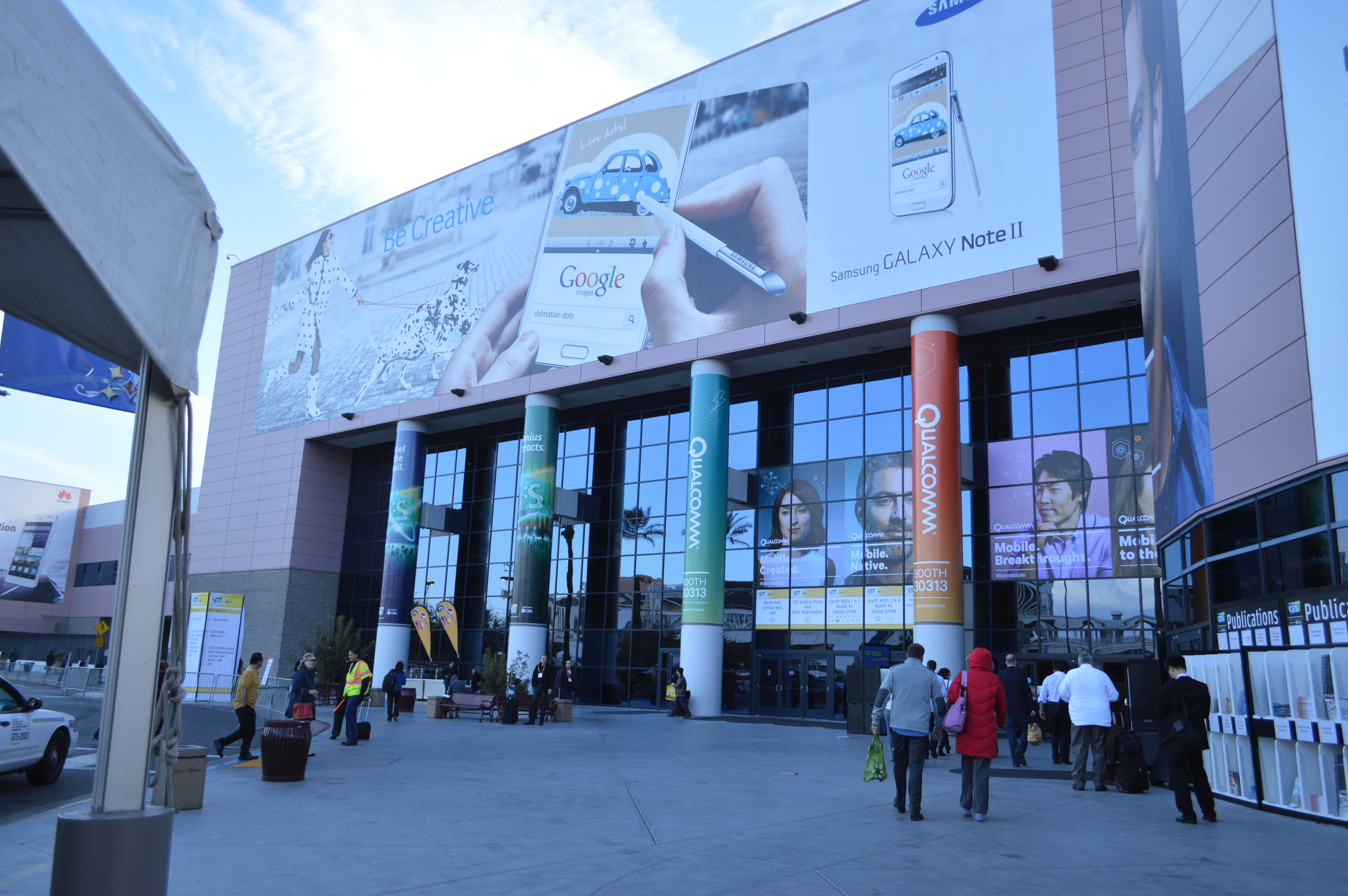
- Las Vegas Convention Center entrance
- Industry: Tourism; Conventions
- Founded: 1955; 71 years ago
- Founder: Nevada Legislature
- Headquarters: Winchester, Nevada, U.S.
- Area served: Southern Nevada
- Total assets: Las Vegas Convention Center
- Website: lvcva.com

The Las Vegas Convention and Visitors Authority (LVCVA) is a quasi government agency and the official destination marketing organization for Southern Nevada. It was founded by the Nevada Legislature in 1955. The LVCVA owns and operates the Las Vegas Convention Center (LVCC) and is responsible for the advertising campaigns for the Clark County, Nevada, area. The LVCVA also owns the Las Vegas Convention Center Loop, the Las Vegas Monorail, and the Las Vegas News Bureau. The LVCVA previously operated the Cashman Center complex; however the City of Las Vegas took control at the end of 2017 and is evaluating possibilities for the facility's future.

The fourteen-member board of directors of LVCVA is made up of eight elected officials appointed from each local municipality and six private-industry members appointed equally by the Nevada Resort Association and the Vegas Chamber. Funding is provided by a room tax on all hotels in the county and through building revenue from the Las Vegas Convention Center, and through issuing bonds.

== Branding ==
One of the primary tasks for the LVCVA is the promotion and branding of Las Vegas. Since 2007, the Las Vegas brand is the second-most recognized brand in the U.S. following Google.

The authority is also responsible for the advertising campaigns for Las Vegas and Southern Nevada. Working with the advertising company R&R Partners since 1982, they have developed advertising campaigns including:

- Only in Vegas
- What happens here, stays here

=== "What happens here, stays here" ===
After the $1 sale of the "What happens here, stays here" trademark to R&R Partners on November 9, 2004, the LVCVA paid $321,000 in attorney's fees because of an investigation into the legality of the controversial sale. The sale was later overturned by a federal judge who claimed that the sale was made without the knowledge of the board.

According to internal LVCVA documents, the advertising campaign "What happens here, stays here" has had little impact as most people, about 70%, stated to R&R (the advertising firm who created the ad and conducted the market research) that the slogan had no impact on their decision to visit Las Vegas. A recent study by Applied Analysis shows that the advertising efforts of the LVCVA return $26 for every $1 spent.

=== VegasMeansBusiness.com ===
In March 2009, the LVCVA launched VegasMeansBusiness.com, a resource for the business community to keep up-to-date on the latest news and events in Las Vegas and the meetings and conventions industry. The website also promotes Las Vegas' attributes as a leading destination for meetings and conventions, including the approximately 150,000 rooms and more than 11,500,000 square feet (1,070,000 m^{2}) of meeting space available and proximity to McCarran International Airport.

=== Athletics baseball ===
On March 7, 2025, the LVCVA and Athletics baseball team announced a deal where the LVCVA's "Las Vegas" logo will appear on the sleeves of Athletics jerseys for three seasons. The Athletics, who played in Oakland, California for 56 years, are relocating to the Las Vegas area pending the completion of a new stadium on the site of the former Tropicana Las Vegas casino and hotel, and the jersey deal will run for the team's scheduled tenure in their interim home of West Sacramento, California.

== West Hall Expansion ==
The LVCVA submitted a master plan to the Southern Nevada Tourism Infrastructure Committee in 2015 that laid the groundwork for the expansion of the Las Vegas Convention Center. A special session of the Nevada Legislature was called in October 2016 where an increase in the lodging tax was approved to secure $1.4 billion for the expansion and renovation of the Las Vegas Convention Center and $750 million for a future NFL stadium. Those plans resulted in the announcement for a planned acquisition of the Riviera in February 2015 for $182.5 million. The Riviera was imploded in 2016 with construction work on the expansion officially beginning in September 2018.

Substantial construction of the new West Hall was completed in December 2020 at a final cost of $1 billion. The expansion added 1.4 million square feet of space to the LVCC campus and includes a 600,000-square-foot exhibit hall.

World of Concrete was the first show to make use of the West Hall in June 2021.

== Activities ==
The authority works to bring events to the Las Vegas area, sometimes by providing funds to subsidize events. These events include:

- 2029 Super Bowl LXIII
- 2024 Super Bowl LVIII
- 2022 NFL Pro Bowl
- 2022 NFL draft
- 2021 Pac-12 Football Championship Game
- 2021 Concacaf Gold Cup
- 2021 UFC International Fight Week
- 2021 Leagues Cup Final
- 2021 WWE SummerSlam
- Life is Beautiful Music & Art Festival
- National Finals Rodeo
- Professional Bull Riders World Finals
- USA Sevens International Rugby Tournament
- 2009 NASCAR Champions Week
- 2009 NHL Awards Ceremony
- 2007 NBA All-Star Game
- 2006 Tennis Channel Open Tennis Tournament

The authority is also a sponsor of the National Hockey League and have the naming rights to Las Vegas Ballpark in a 20-year, $80 million naming rights agreement.

== Research ==
The LVCVA has an in-house research team that conducts research projects and initiates programs that help track the tourism industry in Southern Nevada, the United States, and across the globe.

== Board of directors ==
The authority is governed by a 14-member board. The members are chosen according to a specific formula set out in the Nevada Revised Statutes:

Eight must be elected officials:

- two from the Clark County Commission
- two from the City of Las Vegas (including councilors and the mayor)
- one each from the cities of Boulder City, Henderson, Mesquite, and North Las Vegas

The above eight members then select six more from business:

- three persons nominated by the Vegas Chamber, of which two must represent tourism, with the remaining one representing tourism-related commerce
- three persons nominated by "the association of gaming establishments whose membership in the county collectively paid the most gross revenue fees to the State": i.e., the Nevada Resort Association

Terms on the board are the same as an elected official's, or two years for business members.

Notable board members have included Wynn/Encore president Marilyn Spiegel, Clark County Commissioner James B. Gibson, Las Vegas City Councilwoman Michele Fiore, former Las Vegas mayor and businesswoman Jan Jones Blackhurst, and then-current mayor Carolyn Goodman.

== Awards ==
In 2020, the Las Vegas Convention Center was awarded the Global Biorisk Advisory Council (GBAC) STAR facility accreditation to control the risks associated with infectious agents, including the virus responsible for COVID-19.

In 2020, Las Vegas was named the country’s No. 1 trade show destination for the 26th consecutive year according to Trade Show News Network.

In 2017, Las Vegas was named the World’s Leading Meetings & Conference Destination for the fifth consecutive year according to the World Travel Awards.

In 2017 the LVCVA was awarded Certificate of Achievement for Excellence in Financial Reporting for its Comprehensive Annual Financial Report (CAFR) for the 33rd consecutive year by the Government Finance Officers Association of the United States and Canada (GFOA).

In 2017, the LVCVA was recognized with the Award for Outstanding Achievement in Popular Financial Reporting for the fiscal year 2016 Popular Annual Financial Report (PAFR) for the 10th consecutive year by the Government Finance Officers Association of the United States and Canada (GFOA).

In 2007, the LVCVA won the Psychologically Healthy Workplace Award sponsored by the American Psychological Association.

== Controversy ==
The Nevada Policy Research Institute uncovered fiscal mismanagement with the Las Vegas Convention and Visitors Authority, a public agency in Las Vegas which is funded by visitor-paid room tax dollars. According to NPRI's investigation the LVCVA entered into a ten-year no-bid contract with R&R, a marketing firm, where R&R overcharged the LVCVA and despite the LVCVA uncovering the over-billing management refused to seek repayment. The LVCVA also allowed R&R to approve its own expenses, and failed to question or oversee most of the expenses being billed to them. The contract with R&R is worth $87 million, including a $40 million advertising contract, which includes a commission for R&R, where the LVCVA cannot identify R&R's expenses. Public records show that Rossi Ralenkotter approved approximately $30,000 in spending that included multiple dinners with bottles of wine, veal, fillets, chocolate mousse dessert and a $25,000 donation to the National Jewish Medical and Research Center, a Denver-based hospital which was giving Ralenkotter an award that year. The documents also show that Ralenkotter used tax dollars to pay for limousine services and a tuxedo.

According to NPRI, the LVCVA is funded by the room tax ($220 million in revenue), taking in more money than the Clark County School District, and is also a state agency subject to state laws regarding employees, benefits, and travel expenses. According to the Las Vegas Convention and Visitors Authority, the problems uncovered by NPRI's reports were already documented by an internal auditor and the problems have been addressed by management.

In 2018, an audit committee report disclosed, among other irregularities, board members had been using gift cards, which Southwest Airlines had been providing since 2012, for personal travel. Misuse of the cards had been known since February, 2017.

In March 2020, Ed Finger, the chief financial officer for LVCVA, and Luke Puschnig, the agency's former legal counsel, were among a half-dozen witnesses subpoenaed to testify at a hearing in front of Las Vegas Justice of the Peace, Harmony Letizia.

=== Ethics cases ===
The gift card scandal eventually resulted in several members of the LVCVA agreeing to violations of the Nevada Ethics Law including board members Rossi Ralenkotter, Lawrence Weekly, Brig Lawson and LVCVA staff member Cathy Tull.
