= Chris Edwards (Nevada politician) =

American politician

Member of the Nevada Assembly from the 19th district
- In office November 5, 2014 – November 4, 2020
- Preceded by: Cresent Hardy
- Succeeded by: Annie Black

Personal details
- Born: 1965 (age 60–61) Sleepy Hollow, New York, U.S.
- Party: Republican
- Education: University of Notre Dame; George Washington University
- Occupation: Politician
- Website: Official Campaign Website

Chris Edwards (born 1965) is an American politician. He served as a Republican member of the Nevada Assembly.

== Early life ==
Chris Edwards was born in 1965 in Sleepy Hollow, New York. He graduated from University of Notre Dame, where he received a Bachelor of Arts degree in political science. He received a master of accountancy degree from George Washington University.

== Career ==
Edwards has served in the United States Navy since 1987 and attained the rank of commander. His first attempt at running for public office was in 2012, as a candidate for Nevada's 1st Congressional District. He has served as a Republican member of the Nevada Assembly, where he represented District 19, which includes Mesquite, Overton, Nellis Air Force Base, part of Sunrise Manor and eastern Henderson, from November 5, 2014, to November 4, 2020.
