= Joseph Hogan =

American politician (1937–2014)

Member of the Nevada Assembly from the 10th district
- In office February 1, 2005 – October 17, 2014
- Preceded by: David Goldwater
- Succeeded by: Shelly M. Shelton

Personal details
- Born: August 10, 1937 Fort Dodge, Iowa
- Died: October 17, 2014 (aged 77) Virginia, United States
- Party: Democratic
- Education: University of Notre Dame; Georgetown University

Military service
- Branch/service: United States Navy
- Years of service: 1959–1962

Joseph Michael Hogan (August 10, 1937 – October 17, 2014) was an American politician and a Democratic member of the Nevada Assembly representing District 10 from February 1, 2005 until his death on October 17, 2014.

== Education ==
Hogan earned his BS in business administration from the University of Notre Dame and his JD from Georgetown University.

== Death ==
On October 17, 2014, Hogan died of a stroke at the age of 77, in Virginia. He also was in early stages of Alzheimer's disease and had intended to retire from the legislature.

== Elections ==
- 2004 When Democratic Assemblyman David Goldwater retired and left the District 10 seat open, Hogan won the 2004 Democratic Primary with 1,114 votes (68.22%), and won the November 2, 2004 General election with 7,873 votes (54.75%) against Republican nominee Rex Wilhoite and Independent American candidate Glenn Brown.
- 2006 Hogan was unopposed for the August 15, 2006 Democratic Primary and won the November 7, 2006 General election with 4,468 votes (53.21%) against Republican nominee Jonathan Ozark and Independent American candidate Nicholas Hansen.
- 2008 Hogan was unopposed for the August 12, 2008 Democratic Primary and won the November 4, 2008 General election with 9,154 votes (64.14%) against Republican nominee Mitch Hostmeyer.
- 2010 Hogan was unopposed for the June 8, 2010 Democratic Primary and won the three-way November 2, 2010 General election with 5,330 votes (54.12%) against Republican nominee Tyler Andrews and Libertarian candidate Steve Lenores.
- 2012 Hogan won the June 12, 2012 Democratic Primary with 908 votes (61.85%), and won the November 6, 2012 General election with 10,558 votes (64.02%) against Republican nominee Tim Farrell.
