= What Happens Here, Stays Here =

Slogan for Las Vegas

What Happens Here, Stays Here (also referred to as What Happens in Vegas, Stays in Vegas) is a slogan and advertising campaign for the city of Las Vegas, Nevada.

== Background ==
The original slogan was created in 2003 by the Las Vegas Convention and Visitors Authority and advertising agency R&R Partners. The idea was to brand Las Vegas as more than a gambling destination, promoting adult freedom and empowerment. It was also designed to tie into the city's "Sin City" nickname, to imply that anything was allowed there. In 2020, the campaign was updated and launched as "What Happens Here, Only Happens Here." This was designed to show that Las Vegas had evolved beyond what people had assumed into an entertainment centre.

== In popular culture ==
When the "What Happens Here, Stays Here" ads debuted in February 2003, they became an almost instant "cultural phenomenon" according to Advertising Age. The phrase was referenced by numerous pop culture mainstays, including Saturday Night Live, Meet the Press, Jeopardy!, Wheel of Fortune, the Academy Awards, and others. Two years after the campaign debuted, then-First Lady, Laura Bush, used the tagline in a discussion with Jay Leno on The Tonight Show. A survey in USA Today called the campaign the "most effective" of 2003.

The slogan became the name of the 2008 American comedy What Happens in Vegas. It also inspired a song of the same name by Usher, as well as the film series The Hangover. Comedians often use the slogan as a punchline for jokes about Las Vegas, such as "What happens in Vegas, stays in Vegas, except herpes".

== See also ==
- What happens on tour, stays on tour
- When in Rome, do as the Romans do
