= R&R Partners =

American marketing and public relations firm

- Type: Private
- Industry: Advertising; Marketing; Government affairs
- Founded: 1974; 52 years ago
- Headquarters: Las Vegas, Nevada, U.S.
- Number of locations: 9
- Area served: Global
- Key people: Billy Vassiliadis (Chairman); Michon Martin (CEO and President); Pete Ernaut (Partner/Chief Government Affairs Officer); Matt Mason (Partner/Chief Strategist); Fletcher Whitwell (Partner/Chief Media and Publishing Officer); Matt Matzen (Chief Marketing Officer)
- Website: Official website

R&R Partners is an American advertising, marketing, public relations, and public affairs firm based in Las Vegas, Nevada. They are known for creating the ad campaign "What Happens Here, Stays Here," for the Las Vegas Convention and Visitors Authority (LVCVA). R&R maintains domestic and international clients through its headquarters in Las Vegas, and eight locations in (Austin, Texas; Denver, Colorado; Los Angeles, California; Phoenix, Arizona; Reno, Nevada; Salt Lake City, Utah; and Washington, D.C.); Mexico (Mexico City). In 2013, Adweek named R&R Partners the top marketing agency in the state of Nevada. It was also named one of the best places to work in marketing and media by Advertising Age.

== History ==
=== 1974–1994: Rogich and R&R Advertising ===
R&R Partners was founded in 1974 as "R&R Advertising" by Sig Rogich in Las Vegas, Nevada. The R&R in the name stands for Rogich and Rogich, the founders of the agency.

The firm offered advertising, marketing, and government affairs even in its earliest iteration. Rogich is known to have handled numerous aspects of political campaigns including speechwriting, advertising, and direct mail. In a single election year, he reportedly managed 17 political campaigns in Nevada, all victorious.

In the 1980s, Rogich and R&R Advertising drove several political campaigns on a national level while also managing advertising and marketing for the Las Vegas Convention and Visitors Authority (LVCVA). Rogich was a part of then-President Ronald Reagan's "Tuesday Team," a collection of advertising professionals including Hal Riney and Phil Dusenberry that helped Reagan win the 1984 presidential election. Rogich also led George H. W. Bush's campaign during the 1988 presidential election, helping devise numerous ads for the Bush campaign, including the infamous "Tank" ad, which outlined Democratic contender Michael Dukakis's policies on military spending and used footage of Dukakis riding in a tank. In 2014, Politico released a documentary about the ad and its importance in determining the outcome of the election.

=== 1994–2002: Change of hands, post-Rogich ===
In 1994, Rogich left the firm to focus exclusively on campaign management. Billy Vassiliadis, who had been hired by Rogich in 1982, purchased the firm along with Salt Lake City political consultant Bob Henrie. Vassiliadis became R&R's president, CEO, and majority owner. Mary Ann Mele, Bob Henrie, and Jim King also became co-owners. In 1997, R&R was continuing to oversee the $33.5-million marketing budget of the LVCVA. To promote tourism to the city, the agency produced ad campaigns like "The American Way to Play," the "Resort Bargain of the World," and "Las Vegas: Open 24 Hours."

Throughout the 1990s, R&R offered advisory services to political figures and corporations alike. Clients included politicians on both sides of the political aisle, including Harry Reid, Orrin Hatch and John Ensign. R&R also lobbied for the Nevada Resort Association, which represented many of the casinos on the Las Vegas Strip. They advised corporations like PepsiCo and Procter & Gamble, helping the latter introduce the fat-free ingredient, Olean. R&R has designed marketing campaigns for numerous casinos, and has represented special events such as the National Finals Rodeo and the Miss Universe pageant. In 1998, the firm officially changed its name to "R&R Partners" to reflect its services beyond advertising.

=== 2003: "What Happens Here, Stays Here" ===
In late 2001, R&R Partners sought to create a new branding campaign for the LVCVA to emphasize the emotional connection that visitors have to the Las Vegas brand. It devised the "Vegas Stories" campaign with the tagline "What Happens Here, Stays Here." The commercials featured often unseen but implied exploits of a person or group of people in Las Vegas. For instance, one ad depicted a group of women laughing about an unknown incident while riding in the back of a limousine. Another depicted a couple who had lost their luggage because they hadn't officially checked into their hotel. In virtually every case, the tone of the ad attempted to convey "some excitement and mystique about the Vegas experience."

The first commercial known as "Mistress of Disguise" was meant to debut during Super Bowl XXXVII. However, the NFL refused to allow it in the commercial line-up due to the Las Vegas destination's association with gambling. The NFL's refusal inadvertently caused this first "What Happens Here, Stays Here" spot to achieve greater interest than if it had run during the game. The campaign was also R&R's most market-tested because of its potential for backfire. Many interested parties (including Vassiliadis himself) were concerned that the campaign was too edgy and might alienate a certain segment of the audience.

When the "What Happens Here, Stays Here" ads debuted in February 2003, they became an almost instant "cultural phenomenon" according to Advertising Age. The phrase was referenced by numerous pop culture mainstays, including Saturday Night Live, Meet the Press, Jeopardy!, Wheel of Fortune, the Academy Awards, and others. Two years after the campaign debuted, then-First Lady, Laura Bush, used the tagline in a discussion with Jay Leno on The Tonight Show. A survey in USA Today called the campaign the "most effective" of 2003. The LVCVA renewed R&R's 5-year contract without hearing any other bids, and a record 35 million tourists came to Las Vegas the year the campaign was launched.

The legacy of the campaign exists to the present day. It served as the partial inspiration for films like What Happens in Vegas starring Cameron Diaz and Ashton Kutcher and The Hangover film series starring Bradley Cooper, Zach Galifianakis, Ed Helms, and Ken Jeong. The tagline also earned a spot on the Madison Avenue Walk of Fame in New York City.

=== 2004-present: After "What Happens" and expansion ===
In 2004, R&R had a free rein with the LVCVA's $65-million marketing budget. The company had 220 employees and billed out over $200 million yearly. The headquarters moved to the western Las Vegas suburb known as Summerlin, Nevada, after constructing a 70,000 square-foot purpose-built facility. After the success of the "What Happens Here, Stays Here" campaign, the firm continued providing political and commercial consultation and advertising services. They lobby on behalf of NV Energy and the Nevada Resort Association. They consulted with political candidates Senator Harry Reid, Senator Orrin Hatch and current Nevada Governor, Brian Sandoval. In 2005, R&R announced on behalf of the Agassi Foundation that former tennis star, Andre Agassi, would not run for a seat in the United States Congress.

In 2006, the LVCVA attempted to sell the rights to the "What Happens Here, Stays Here" slogan to R&R for only one dollar. This was done as a measure to allow R&R to seek lawsuits against any entity that unlawfully used or profited off of the slogan. A federal judge nullified the trademark sale in 2006. A lawsuit against a California businesswoman who had used a variation of the slogan was successful for the LVCVA and R&R. Also in 2006, R&R began creating LGBT-inclusive ads for Paris Las Vegas and the LVCVA.

In 2008, the LVCVA and R&R were the subjects of an independent Nevada Policy Research Institute (NPRI) investigation. The investigation revealed that the LVCVA breached contract agreements by allowing R&R to make expenditures over $500 without LVCVA review. The LVCVA also allowed an R&R subsidiary to overbill by 43% on a 1999 project. Some have criticized the NPRI investigation because the agency receives funding from the Las Vegas Sands Corp., a private competitor of the tax-funded LVCVA. In 2009, R&R signed a new three-year $270 million contract with the LVCVA (with an option for 3 additional years beyond that). The previous contract had been for 5 years and $325 million.

Between 2010 and 2011, R&R Partners expanded to six different locations, including Los Angeles. In 2012, R&R added Austin, Texas and Denver, Colorado to their list of markets. The "What Happens Here, Stays Here" ads were briefly pulled in 2012 in order to make room for the LVCVA's push to market LasVegas.com. The ads returned to the airwaves at the end of 2013. In 2014, R&R opened their first international location in Mexico City, bringing their total number of locations to nine (eight in the United States). In 2015, they again signed on to continue as the chief marketing organization for the LVCVA.

In 2020, R&R Partners created an updated version of "What Happens Here, Stays Here," referred to as "What Happens Here, Only Happens Here."

R&R Partners was awarded a six-year contract for marketing and advertising by LVCVA in 2021.

== Recognition and awards ==
R&R Partners has won numerous awards for both the business itself and the ad campaigns it has created. Its "What Happens Here, Stays Here" campaign was called the "most effective" ad campaign in 2003 by a survey in USA Today. The campaign also earned R&R and the LVCVA the honor of being named Brandweek Grand Marketer of the Year in 2004. In 2008, the firm won an Effie Award for a television ad it created for the Southern Nevada Water Authority. In 2010, Advertising Age named R&R one of the best places to work in marketing and media. The firm won another Effie Award in 2012 for a commercial it created to promote the Valley Metro, the public transportation authority in the Phoenix, Arizona area. Also in 2012, R&R won the Internet Advertising Competition Award for Outstanding Achievement in Internet Advertising for their ad campaign for Boeing's new airplane. In 2013, the firm was named the top marketing agency in Nevada by Adweek.
