= 2026 in New Jersey =

- Decades: 2000s; 2010s; 2020s
- See also: History of New Jersey; Historical outline of New Jersey; List of years in New Jersey; 2026 in the United States

The following is a list of events of the year 2026 in New Jersey.

== Incumbents ==
=== State government ===
- Governor: Mikie Sherrill (D)

== Events ==
=== February ===
- February 27 – Defense Secretary Pete Hegseth announces the DoD will no longer allow military members to attend Princeton University, among other schools.

=== March ===
- March 4 – An explosion occurs at an oil refinery plant in Logan Township, injuring multiple people.
- March 23 – Immigration and Customs Enforcement agents are deployed to 14 airports nationwide, including Newark Liberty International Airport.

=== May ===
- May 3 – A passenger plane from Venice, Italy strikes a light post and bakery truck while landing at Newark Liberty International Airport. The truck driver is treated for minor injuries.
- May 13 – Princeton University announces it is ending its Honor Code system, in which exams were unproctored and students were expected to report others suspected of cheating. The retirement of the system, which had been introduced in 1893, is due to an increase of students using artificial intelligence to cheat.
- May 25
  - The Princeton Tigers beat the Notre Dame Fighting Irish to win the 2026 NCAA Division I men's lacrosse tournament.
  - Amid a hunger strike by detainees at Delaney Hall in Newark, ICE agents fire pepper balls and pepper-spray at protesters outside, including Senator Andy Kim. Governor Sherrill attempts to enter the facility but is denied access.

=== June ===
- June 15 – An ICE agent shoots a vehicle that reportedly struck him in Manahawkin.
- June 16 – Six people are injured in an acid attack in Jersey City.

=== July ===
- July 6 – Heavy rains cause flooding in Monmouth County. A roof collapses at a BJ's Wholesale Club in Oakhurst, temporarily trapping two people.
- July 17 – A federal appeals court rules New Jersey's ban on assault firearms is unconstitutional.
- July 19 – The 2026 FIFA World Cup final is held in MetLife Stadium in East Rutherford, New Jersey, in which Spain beats Argentina 1–0 in extra time.

=== August ===
- August 5 – The state reports two municipal water systems were affected by cyberattacks suspected to have been committed by Iranian hackers.
- August 30 – Eleven people are shot, two fatally, at a cookout in Trenton.

=== September ===
- September 4 – At an Ed Sheeran concert at MetLife Stadium, opening act Macklemore performs his pro-Palestinian song "Hind's Hall" and announces "Free Palestine". Following pressure from Gillette Stadium owner Robert Kraft, Sheeran drops Macklemore from remaining acts of the Loop Tour.
- September 19 – A 93-year-old woman accidentally drives an SUV into tables outside a restaurant in Lavallette, killing a woman and injuring seven people.
- September 21 – Flights are grounded at Newark International Airport and Teterboro Airport after an Amtrak construction crew accidentally cuts a fiber line in New Jersey, causing a telecom outage.
- September 25 – Following calls from Governor Sherrill, Lieutenant Governor Dale Caldwell resigns. The resignation comes a day after an investigation found he behaved inappropriately around women.

=== November ===
- November 3
  - United States House of Representatives elections in New Jersey
  - United States Senate election in New Jersey: Cory Booker wins reelection.
- November 19 – A pipe bomb is found under a highway overpass in Piscataway. A 67-year-old man is arrested. The suspect had also once been convicted of placing another pipe bomb under a different bridge in 2019.

== See also ==
- 2026 in the United States
