= 2027 in New Jersey =

- Decades: 2000s; 2010s; 2020s
- See also: History of New Jersey; Historical outline of New Jersey; List of years in New Jersey; 2027 in the United States

The following is a list of events of the year 2027 in New Jersey.

== Events ==
=== Planned or predicted ===
- November 2 -
  - 2027 New Jersey General Assembly election
  - 2027 New Jersey Senate election
