= 1776 in New Jersey =

- Decades: 1750s; 1760s; 1770s; 1780s; 1790s
- See also: History of New Jersey; Historical outline of New Jersey; List of years in New Jersey; 1776 in the United States

This is a list of events in the year 1776 in New Jersey.

== Incumbents ==
- Colonial governor: William Franklin (until January)
- Governor: William Livingston (starting August 31st)

== Events ==
- January 1 – The 3rd New Jersey Regiment is raised at Elizabethtown.
- June 29 – American Revolution: Battle of Turtle Gut Inlet – The Continental Navy successfully challenges the British Royal Navy blockade off Cape May County.
- August 13 – The New Jersey Legislative Council is elected, with the New Jersey Provincial Council being succeeded into the Legislative Council.
- August 27 – The first session of the New Jersey Legislative Council convenes with the Provincial Congress of New Jersey ceased to function under the New Jersey State Constitution.
- August 31 – William Livingston is sworn in as the first governor.
- September 16 – The 4th New Jersey Regiment is raised at Elizabethtown.
- November 20 – American Revolution: Battle of Fort Lee – Invasion of New Jersey by British and Hessian forces and subsequent general retreat of the Continental Army.
- December 14 – American Revolution: Ambush of Geary
- December 22–23 – American Revolution: Battle of Iron Works Hill
- December 25 – American Revolution: At 6 p.m. Gen. George Washington and his troops, numbering 2,400, march to McConkey's Ferry, cross the Delaware River, and land on the New Jersey bank by 3 a.m. the following morning.
- December 26 – American Revolution: Battle of Trenton: Washington's troops surprise the 1500 Hessian troops under the command of Col. Johann Rall at 8 a.m. outside Trenton and score a victory, taking 948 prisoners while suffering only 5 wounded.

== Births ==
- January 24
  - Jean-Guillaume, baron Hyde de Neuville, French nobleman, diplomat, physician and politician (d. 1857)
  - Peter Augustus Jay, lawyer and politician (d. 1843)
- February 1 – William M. Crane, military personnel (d. 1846)
- March 1 – Elias Moore, politician (d. 1847)
- March 3 – James Parker, surveyor, and politician (d. 1868)
- March 21 – John Frederick Frelinghuysen, general and lawyer (d. 1833)
- April 3 – Elias B. Caldwell, clerk (d. 1825)
- July 5 – Bernard Smith, politician (d. 1835)
- September 5 – Stephen Whitney, merchant (d. 1860)
- December 7 – Reuben Whallon, businessman and politician (d. 1843)

=== Undated ===
- Hetty Reckless, runaway slave (d. 1888)
- Joshua Shaw, English [later naturalised as American] artist and inventor (d. 1860)

== Deaths ==
- March 30 – Jonathan Belcher, lawyer, and chief justice (b. 1710)
- June 29 – Richard Wickes, military personnel (b. unknown)
- October 9 – Philip Vickers Fithian, tutor (b. 1747)
- August 27 – Philip Johnston, military personnel and patriot (b. unknown)
- December 14 – Francis Geary, British Army officer (b. 1752)
- December 27 – Johann Rall, German colonel

=== Undated ===
- Pierre Abraham Lorillard, French-American tobacconist (b. 1742)
- Garrat Noel, bookseller and educator (b. 1706)
- Joseph Sharp, early settler, landowner, supporter of education, iron manufacturer and industrialist (b. 1708)

== See also ==
- 1776 in the United States
- List of years in New Jersey
