= 2025 in New Jersey =

- Decades: 2000s; 2010s; 2020s
- See also: History of New Jersey; Historical outline of New Jersey; List of years in New Jersey; 2025 in the United States

The following is a list of events of the year 2025 in New Jersey.

== Incumbents ==
=== State government ===
- Governor: Phil Murphy (D)

== Events ==
=== March ===
- March 10 – Fifteen people are injured, including one seriously, when a school bus overturns on the Garden State Parkway in Montvale.

=== May ===
- May 9 – Agents with the Department of Homeland Security arrest Newark Mayor Ras Baraka at a U.S. Immigration and Customs Enforcement facility set to be built in his city. ICE arrests Baraka for trespassing, though Representative LaMonica McIver, who witnessed the arrest, says he had already exited the grounds when they arrested him.
- May 10 - The Sheraton Mahwah Hotel, formerly Sheraton Crossroads, is demolished by controlled implosion in Mahwah.

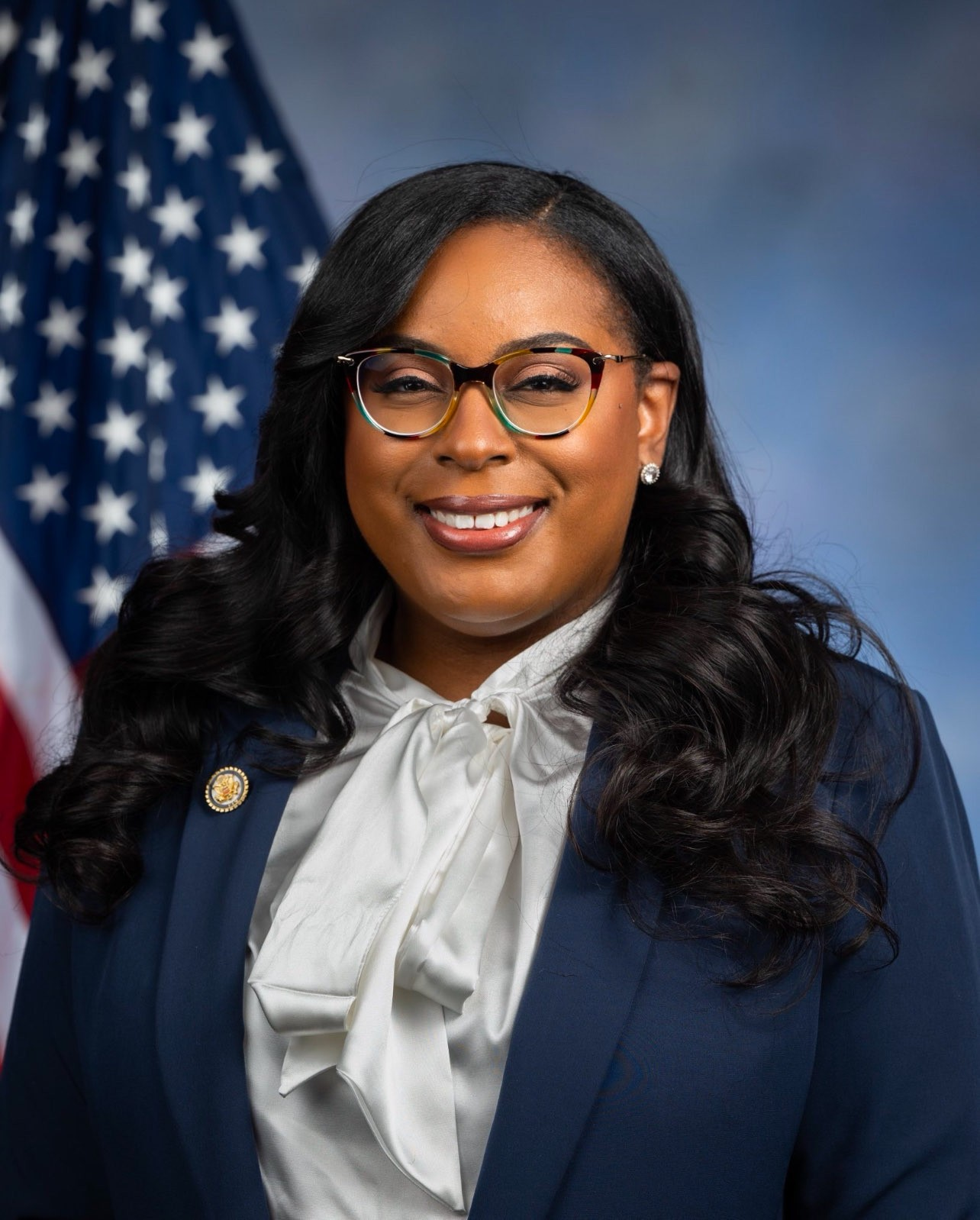
May 19: Representative LaMonica McIver (pictured) is charged with assault.

- May 16 – Train engineers at New Jersey Transit go on strike.
- May 19 – U.S. Attorney for New Jersey Alina Habba announces that trespassing charges against Ras Baraka have been dropped, but that Representative LaMonica McIver is being charged with assault in connection to the same incident.
- May 23 – The Department of Justice sues four New Jersey sanctuary cities (Newark, Hoboken, Jersey City, and Paterson) for alleged immigration violations.

=== June ===
- June 13 – Four inmates escape from an ICE facility in Newark.
- June 15–July 13 – The 2025 FIFA Club World Cup takes place in 11 cities across the United States, including East Rutherford. Chelsea FC beats Paris Saint-Germain FC 3–0 to win the cup.

=== July ===
- July 2 – Three people are killed by strong thunderstorms in central New Jersey, including two in Plainfield and one in North Plainfield.
- July 14 – Two people are killed by flash floods in Plainfield.
- July 16 – One person is killed and 13 injured by a lightning strike at an archery range in Jackson Township.

=== August ===
- August 21 – A federal judge rules acting U.S. Attorney for New Jersey Alina Habba, who has been in the role since March, has been unlawfully serving since July 1.

=== September ===
- September 18 – New Jersey and nine other Northeastern states announce the formation of the Northeast Public Health Collaborative, a coalition of local health leaders.
- September 29 – The Trump administration sues two organizations that protested outside a synagogue in West Orange in November 2024, filing suit under the Freedom of Access to Clinic Entrances Act, which also applies to houses of worship. The protest in 2024 had been held in response to the synagogue hosting a real estate fair with settlements in the West Bank. The lawsuit is believed to be the first time the aforementioned law has been applied to a house of worship.

=== October ===
- October 31 – Five people, including three children, are killed in a house fire in Paterson. One of the adult victims is identified as the cousin of State Assemblyman Al Abdelaziz.

=== November ===
- November 4 – Democratic Representative Mikie Sherrill is elected governor of New Jersey, beating Republican challenger Jack Ciattarelli.
- November 13 – 14 people, including a suspected member of the Lucchese crime family and student athletes, are charged in connection to an illegal sports betting ring.
- November 22 – No. 8 seed Gotham FC wins the 2025 NWSL Championship, defeating the No. 2 seed Washington Spirit 1–0.

=== December ===
- December 28 – Two helicopter pilots are killed when their helicopters collide in Hammonton.

== See also ==
- 2025 in the United States
