= My Hometown =

1985 single by Bruce Springsteen

Single by Bruce Springsteen

from the album Born in the U.S.A.
- B-side: "Santa Claus is Comin' to Town"
- Released: November 21, 1985
- Recorded: June 29, 1983
- Studio: Hit Factory, New York City
- Genre: Rock; folk
- Length: 4:33 (album version); 4:10 (edit version)
- Label: Columbia
- Songwriter: Bruce Springsteen
- Producers: Jon Landau; Chuck Plotkin; Bruce Springsteen; Steven Van Zandt

Bruce Springsteen singles chronology
"I'm Goin' Down" (1985)	"My Hometown" (1985)	"War" (1986)

Music video
- My Hometown on Youtube.com

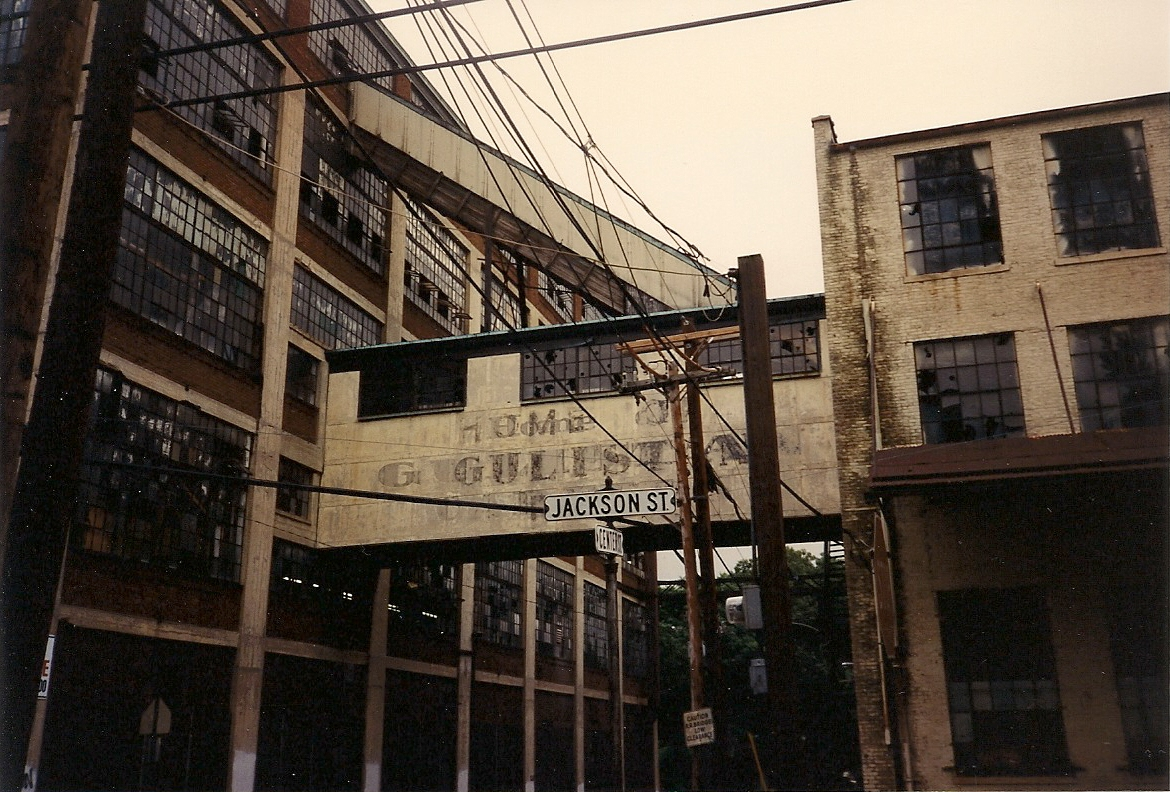
A portion of the Karagheusian Rug Mill as it stood, long abandoned, in Freehold in 1990.

"My Hometown" is a single by the American singer-songwriter Bruce Springsteen from his Born in the U.S.A. album as its closing track, that was the then-record-tying seventh and last top 10 single to come from it, peaking at #7 on the Cash Box Top 100 and #6 on the Billboard Hot 100 singles chart. It also topped the U.S. adult contemporary chart, making the song Springsteen's only #1 song on this chart to date. The song is a synthesizer-based, low-tempo number that features Springsteen on vocals.

== Lyrics ==
The song's lyrics begin with the speaker's memories of his father instilling pride in the family's hometown. While it first appears that the song will be a nostalgic look at the speaker's childhood, the song then goes on to describe the racial violence and economic depression that the speaker witnessed as an adolescent and a young adult. The song concludes with the speaker's reluctant proclamation that he plans to move his family out of the town, but not without first taking his own son on a drive and expressing the same community pride that was instilled in him by his father.

Some of the song's images reference the recent history of Springsteen's hometown, Freehold Borough, New Jersey, in particular the racial strife in 1960s New Jersey and economic tensions from the same times (such as the "textile mill being closed" was the A & M Karagheusian Rug Mill at Center and Jackson Streets of Freehold).

== Reception ==
Cash Box called it a "tender and somber look at the real American hometown" that is "evocative in rare way." Billboard called it a "contemplative, insightful single."

== Music video ==
The music video for "My Hometown" was a straightforward video filming of a performance of the song at a Springsteen and E Street Band concert late in the Born in the U.S.A. Tour, eschewing fast-paced cutting for slower montages of Springsteen and various band members. Despite its lack of visual excitement, it still managed substantial MTV airplay in late 1985 and early 1986.

== Track listing ==
1. "My Hometown" - 4:33
2. "Santa Claus Is Comin' to Town" - 4:27

The B-side of the single, "Santa Claus Is Comin' to Town", was a semi-comical live recording of the Christmas favorite from a Springsteen and E Street Band concert on December 12, 1975, at C. W. Post College on Long Island, New York. Long familiar to Springsteen fans from its distribution years earlier to rock radio stations, it had previously been released on the fairly unknown 1981 children's album In Harmony 2; now in time for the Christmas season it was being issued again. Always a radio favorite, "Santa Claus" would benefit from the all-holiday-music-all-the-time formats of the 2000s, and during the 2005 holiday season "Santa Claus" would appear on the Billboard Top 40 Adult Recurrents and Hot Digital Songs charts.

== Covers ==
- U2 performed the song live at Croke Park on June 29, 1985 on The Unforgettable Fire Tour.
- Cindy Kallet, Ellen Epstein & Michael Cicone performed the song on their 1993 album Only Human.
- Neil Young recorded the song on his 2014 album A Letter Home.
- Pavel Bobek performed the song as "Můj rodný dům" on his 1988 album Já při tom byl.
- Mischief Brew, Erik Petersen recorded and digitally released the song on Thanks, Bastards.

== Personnel ==
According to authors Philippe Margotin and Jean-Michel Guesdon, and the album's liner notes:

- Bruce Springsteen – vocals, guitars

The E Street Band

- Roy Bittan – synthesizer
- Clarence Clemons – tambourine
- Danny Federici – organ
- Garry Tallent – bass
- Max Weinberg – drums

Additional performer

- Ruth Jackson – backing vocals

== Charts ==
Chart (1986)	Peak position
Australian Singles Chart	47
Canada (RPM Magazine)	16
Europe (Eurochart Hot 100)	34
Irish Singles Chart	6
Netherlands Music Chart	24
New Zealand Music Chart	28
Sweden Music Chart	21
UK Singles Chart	9
US Billboard Hot 100	6
US Adult Contemporary (Billboard)	1
US Album Rock Tracks (Billboard)	6

== Certifications ==
Region	Certification	Certified units/sales
Australia (ARIA)	Gold	35,000^{‡}
Canada (Music Canada)	Gold	50,000^{^}
New Zealand (RMNZ)	Gold	15,000^{‡}
United Kingdom (BPI)	Silver	250,000^{^}
United States (RIAA)	Platinum	1,000,000^{‡}
^{^} Shipments figures based on certification alone.^{‡} Sales+streaming figures based on certification alone.

== See also ==
- Death to My Hometown
- List of number-one adult contemporary singles of 1986 (U.S.)
