= 2023 in New Jersey =

- Decades: 2000s; 2010s; 2020s
- See also: History of New Jersey; Historical outline of New Jersey; List of years in New Jersey; 2023 in the United States

The following is a list of events of the year 2023 in New Jersey.

== Incumbents ==
=== State government ===
- Governor: Phil Murphy (D)

== Events ==
- April 10 – 2023 Rutgers University strike: The staff of Rutgers University vote to go on the first strike by academics in the school's 257-year history, affecting over 67,000 students.
- July 6 – A large fire on a cargo ship docked at the Port Newark–Elizabeth Marine Terminal in the Port of New York and New Jersey, kills two firefighters and injures five others.
- August 2 – Two people are killed and two others are injured by an explosion at a house in Buena.
- October 8 – Swaminarayan Akshardham, the world's second largest Hindu temple, is officially inaugurated and opened in Robbinsville.

== See also ==
- 2023 in the United States
