= Violet A. Johnson =

American civic leader (b. 1870, d. 1939)

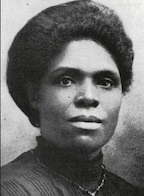
- Born: 1870; Wilmington, North Carolina
- Died: November 21, 1939 (aged 68–69); Summit, New Jersey
- Occupations: Civic leader, suffragist

Violet A. Johnson (1870 – November 21, 1939) was an American civic leader and suffragist.

== Early life ==
Johnson was born in Wilmington, North Carolina. She became a domestic servant for the John Eggers family in the early 1890s, first in New York, then in Summit, New Jersey in 1897 where the family relocated.

== Community work and suffrage ==
Johnson served as a housekeeper to the Eggers family for 45 years. In the late 1890s, she also organized a Bible study group that became Summit's first African-American church, Fountain Baptist Church. At the church, Johnson was founder and president of the missionary society and president of the Deaconess Board, among other leadership roles. By joining the all-white New Jersey Women's Suffrage Association (NJWSA), Johnson's leadership helped transform New Jersey's women's suffrage movement into a multi-racial movement.

During World War I, she organized black women and girls for war relief work, and kept the clubs going after the war. After suffrage was won in 1920, she organized voter registration campaigns, and gave speeches on behalf of candidates she endorsed.

In the late 1920s Johnson established the Girls Industrial Home, a school for training African-American women and girls for domestic work. She was a founder and officer of the Summit chapter of the NAACP, and served as a trustee of the National Training School for Women and Girls in Washington, D.C. She was also active in the Federation of Colored Women's Clubs of New Jersey, as chair of its anti-lynching campaign.

== Personal life ==
Johnson died in 1939, in Summit, New Jersey, aged 69 years. Florence Spearing Randolph officiated at her funeral service, at the church Johnson founded.
