= 2024 in New Jersey =

- Decades: 2000s; 2010s; 2020s
- See also: History of New Jersey; Historical outline of New Jersey; List of years in New Jersey; 2024 in the United States

The following is a list of events of the year 2024 in New Jersey.

== Incumbents ==
=== State government ===
- Governor: Phil Murphy (D)

== Events ==
- January 10 – Chris Christie 2024 presidential campaign: Former governor of New Jersey Chris Christie withdraws from the 2024 Republican Party presidential primaries.
- March 16 – Three people are fatally shot in Levittown, Pennsylvania, with the gunman fleeing to Trenton, by commandeering a car to his house. A standoff involving several hostages ends with the gunman's arrest.
- April 5 – 2024 New Jersey earthquake: A magnitude 4.8 earthquake strikes northwestern New Jersey, causing tremors throughout the East Coast of the United States.
- June 4 –
  - 2024 New Jersey Democratic presidential primary
  - 2024 New Jersey Republican presidential primary
- October 14 – One person is killed and 23 others are injured when an NJ Transit River Line train collides with a tree that had fallen onto the tracks in Mansfield Township.
- November 5 – 2024 United States presidential election in New Jersey
- November 8 – A massive wildfire burns in the forests of New York and New Jersey. Fire fighters from both states joined forces to put out the fire.
- November 16 – It is announced that the Kingda Ka roller coaster, the world's tallest roller coaster, will be retired at the Six Flags Great Adventure amusement park.
- December 11 – Several drones of unknown operators are spotted over New Jersey, with some going over military areas. In January 2025, Trump announced that they were not the enemy.

== See also ==
- 2024 in the United States
