= Electoral reform in New Jersey =

U.S. state electoral reform

Electoral reform in New Jersey refers to efforts to change the voting laws in the Garden state.

== Electoral College ==
In January 2008, New Jersey become the second state, after Maryland, to pass legislation that opposes the Electoral College in the United States. The compact, signed by Democratic Governor Jon S. Corzine, would deliver the state's 15 electoral votes to the winner of the national popular vote. The compact, however, would take effect only if enough states agree to it, that is, enough states to win a majority of votes in the Electoral College. The goal of such legislation is to ensure that an occurrence similar to that of the 2000 election, where the winner of the presidential election did not hold the highest number of votes nationally, does not happen. Republican members of the New Jersey General Assembly opposed the legislation.

== See also ==
- Electoral reform in the United States
- Electoral reform
