= New Jersey in the 20th century =

New Jersey in the twentieth century underwent many changes. New Jersey's position along the Atlantic Ocean made it a prominent part of both of the World Wars. Despite rising in the Roaring Twenties, New Jersey's economy slowed with the start of the Great Depression. It also became a site for Nike missile batteries during the Cold War. In the 1960s, several race riots occurred following the start of urban decay. Through the 1970s, urbanization increased again, and these problems slowed.

== Early 1900s ==
Historical population
Census	Pop.	Note	%±
1900	1,883,669		—
1910	2,537,167		34.7%
1920	3,155,900		24.4%
1930	4,041,334		28.1%
1940	4,160,165		2.9%
1950	4,835,329		16.2%
1960	6,066,782		25.5%
1970	7,168,164		18.2%
1980	7,364,823		2.7%
1990	7,730,188		5.0%

The Standard Oil Company of New Jersey was a large integrated oil producing, transporting, refining, and marketing organization, founded by Henry H. Rogers, William Rockefeller, and John D. Rockefeller. In 1911, the United States Supreme Court ordered the dissolution of the Standard Oil Company of New Jersey, viewing it as violating the Sherman Antitrust Act. Standard Oil had controlled nearly 90% of refined oil flows into the United States, having a near complete monopoly upon it. Standard Oil Company was split into 34 smaller companies as a result of the dissolution.

== The Great Migration ==
New Jersey's African American population grew rapidly in the early 20th century during the phases of the Great Migration and Second Great Migration from 1910 to 1970. African Americans migrated north for the growing numbers of industrial jobs and to get the right to vote, a better education for their children, and improved living conditions. They fled disfranchisement in the South, Jim Crow laws, and a fear of lynching.

1910 - 89,760 total colored, 3.5 percent of population of 2.5 million
1930 - 208,829 total colored, 5 percent of population of 4 million
1960 - 514,875 total colored, 8.5 percent of population of 6.1 million

== World War I ==
New Jersey was a site of shipbuilding throughout the World War I period. Refineries and ammunition factories were also built to supply war material. Factories such as the Singer Company based in Elizabeth converted from making sewing machines to making weapon parts. Several camps and the forts were opened for soldiers during the war. The roles of these sites were generally to provide a location for soldiers to stock up on supplies, receive medical treatment, or become discharged. Several Allied ships were sunken off of the coast of New Jersey. Other factors contributing to the U.S. Entry into the war include German sabotage of both Black Tom in Jersey City, and the Kingsland explosion in what is now Lyndhurst.

Camp Merritt was activated for use in World War I. It was from there that many soldiers headed for war in Europe were deployed to Hoboken in order to be shipped off to Europe. Camp Merritt was decommissioned in November 1919. Fort Dix, in Pemberton Township, was also constructed to help in the war effort starting in June 1917. It was used as a training and staging ground throughout the war. After the end of the war, it was converted into a demobilization center.

In addition to camps for training soldiers, factories were needed desperately to produce ammunition to help the war effort. Four companies that produced ammunition were created during the World War I period: Atlantic Loading Co., Bethlehem Loading Company, DuPont Engineering Company, and T. A. Gillespie Loading Company. Around 1919, after the end of World War I, these companies and plants slowed and ceased production of war materials. (The Gillespie plant was destroyed by explosions on October 4, 1918.) In addition, New Jersey became a leading chemical producer worldwide after discovering German secrets. Many chemical companies in New Jersey were able to exploit their advantage to become some of the largest chemical producers.

== Roaring Twenties ==
People standing on the New Jersey-New York border in the newly constructed Holland Tunnel.

Like much of the rest of the United States, New Jersey entered a prosperous state through the 1920s. Through this period, New Jersey's population and employment rate increased greatly. Though factory production decreased after the end of World War I, production lines still remained in relatively high production.

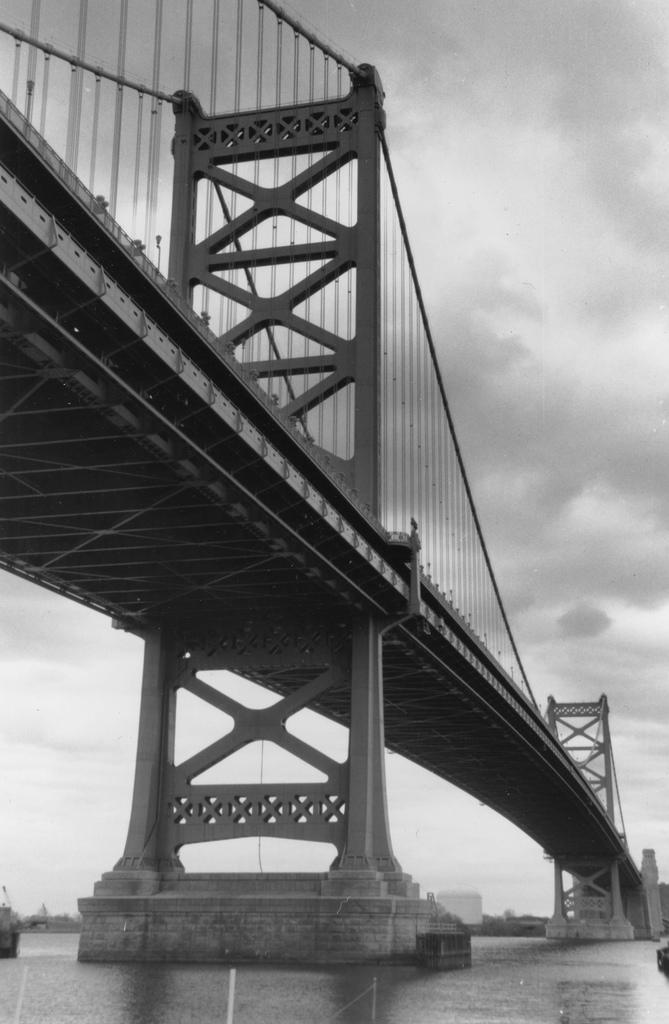
The Benjamin Franklin Bridge in 1970s

Transportation became much easier through the 1920s. Cars became easily affordable and common. Roads were paved and improved greatly. As a result, many people who had never been farther than their hometown now could travel around the state. The Jersey Shore became extremely popular through this period of time. The Benjamin Franklin Bridge was completed, linking Camden, New Jersey and Philadelphia, Pennsylvania in 1926. The Holland Tunnel, under the Hudson River, was completed in 1927 providing a means of easy transportation between New Jersey and New York City. Before, ferries were required to travel across the Hudson River. Later on, the George Washington Bridge (1931) and the Lincoln Tunnel (1937) were completed, making access to Manhattan even easier.

New Jersey was also the first state in the United States to ratify Prohibition, which restricted the purchasing and selling of alcohol. However, the Eighteenth Amendment to the United States Constitution, which banned alcohol manufacturing & sales, was later repealed by the Twenty-first Amendment in December 1933. Newark's breweries reopened almost immediately.

== Great Depression ==
Like all the rest of the United States, New Jersey was hit hard by the Great Depression. By 1933, one-tenth of the population were dependent upon the Franklin D. Roosevelt's New Deal. In fact, New Jersey issued begging licenses to the poor and unemployed people because the New Jersey government funds were growing low and were being exhausted. Under the Works Progress Administration, part of the Second New Deal by FDR, many new jobs were provided in order to support the poor and unemployed. These projects included the expansion of Fort Dix, Roosevelt Park in Edison, and Rutgers Stadium in Piscataway. In Jersey City political boss Frank Hague secured the construction the Medical Center, the Armory, and Roosevelt Stadium. Strikes also grew common during the Great Depression; in 1937 a group of gravediggers from New Jersey went on strike.

In 1938 Orson Welles' produced his infamous The War of the Worlds radio broadcast from New Jersey. Listeners were told that a "huge, flaming object, believed to be a meteorite, fell on a farm in the neighborhood of Grover’s Mill, New Jersey, twenty-two miles from Trenton." It went on to describe extraterrestrial monsters that destroyed massive stretches of lands in New Jersey as well as massacring many people. Although it was announced in advance and at conclusion as a radio play, the broadcast resulted in widespread panic into New Jersey and the surrounding areas. Many people had believed the bulletin to be real, and that New Jersey truthfully was being torn up by giant and immensely powerful Martians. People fled the New Jersey area, while others worked hard to blockade their homes and ensure safety from the reported monsters. Listeners were relieved to discover at the end of the broadcast that it had been a fictional account. CBS was criticized for allowing fictitious bulletins to gain attention of listeners. Welles and the other broadcasters were not punished by law, but were held under a brief informal "house arrest" for a short period of time while being bombarded by questions by news reporters.

During the Great Depression, 20-month-old Charles Augustus Lindbergh, Jr., son of famous aviator Charles Lindbergh, was abducted from his home near Hopewell, New Jersey. A long investigation ensued as detectives attempted to round up the kidnapper of the baby. The police proceeded to seal off many roads in order to prevent the kidnapper's escape, and interrogated the members of the Lindbergh household. The stress of being under police questioning led to the suicide of Violet Sharpe. Dr. John F. Condon became a negotiator between the kidnapper "John" and the Lindbergh family. The kidnapper demanded a ransom of $50,000, which was paid but turned out to be a hoax. Two other hoaxes were perpetrated by two other people who were not involved in the kidnapping, desperate to get their hands on ransom money. Both were charged after their declarations proved false. The baby was later found dead.

However, federal experts and detectives slowly managed to locate and capture the kidnapper. James J. Finn was a lieutenant who tracked the ransom money. He had agents travel to banks to capture the kidnapper while passing the ransom bills. Meanwhile, Arthur Koehler, a federal expert, carefully examined the ladder used by the kidnapper. He traced the ladder to a company in McCormick, South Carolina. Finally, a ransom note was located and traced to Bruno Hauptmann; the bill had the license plate number of Hauptmann's blue Dodge Saloon that was written down by a gas attendant. He was tried in Flemington, New Jersey in what was known as the "Trial of the Century", and was convicted.

Bruno Hauptmann was electrocuted in the New Jersey State Prison in Trenton, New Jersey. As a result of the Lindbergh kidnapping the Federal Kidnapping Act, also known as the Lindbergh Law, was passed making kidnapping a federal law. The Agatha Christie mystery novel Murder on the Orient Express may have been based upon this kidnapping, with events paralleling many of the Lindbergh kidnapping.

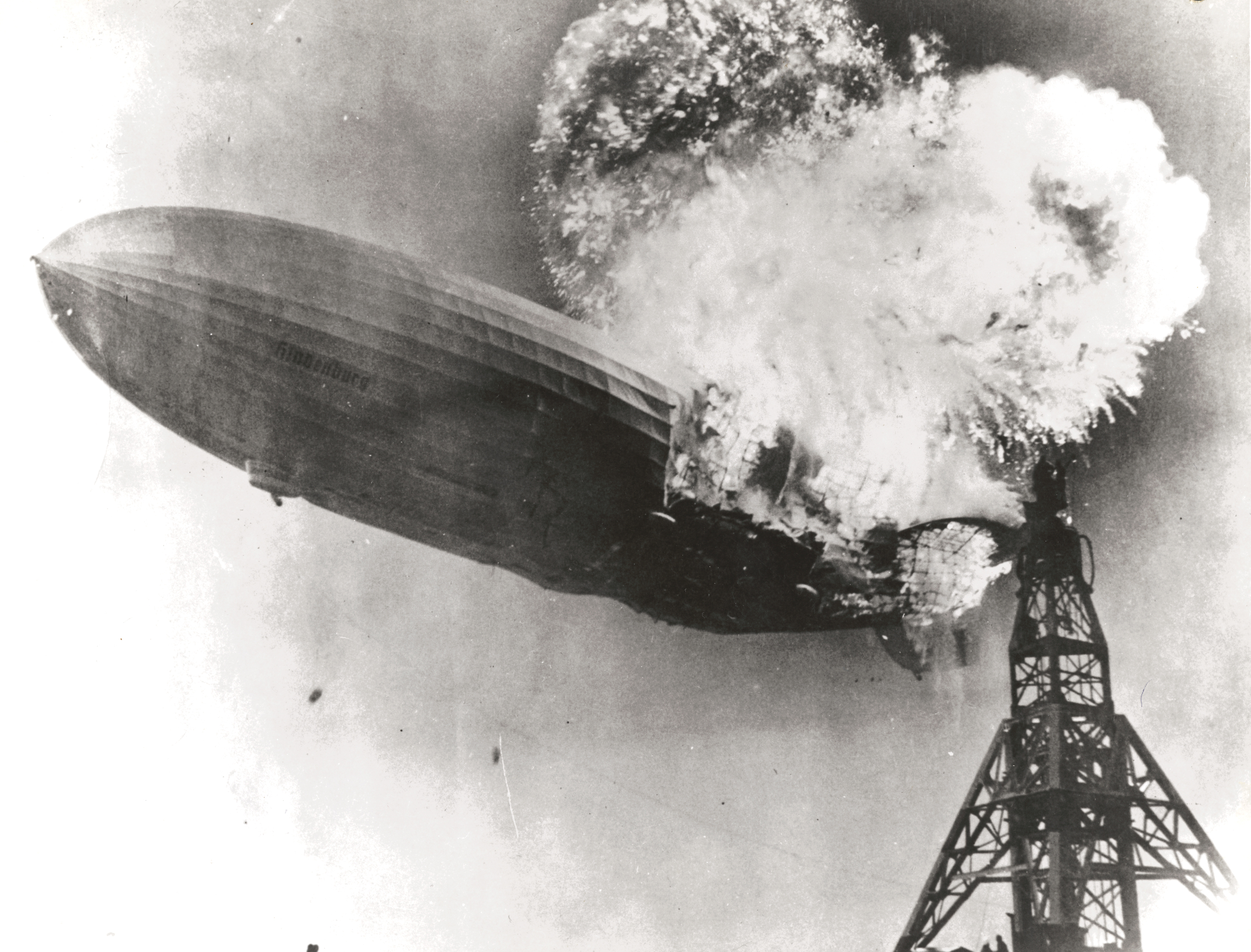
The Hindenburg just moments after catching fire.

In 1937 the German zeppelin Hindenburg exploded over Lakehurst, New Jersey. While approaching a mooring mast in Lakehurst, the zeppelin suddenly caught fire, and within 34 seconds the entire hydrogen-filled zeppelin was engulfed in flames; 36 people died in the disaster, most of them leaping from the burning ship. Contrary to popular belief, the Hindenburg had flown an entire year of successful voyages before it caught on fire. Questions and controversy surround the accident to this day: theories for the sudden burst of flames include sabotage against the German Nazis, static buildup, and flammable fabric.

The Hindenburg was not the first flaming shipwreck to encounter New Jersey during the 1930s, though. The SS Morro Castle caught fire during a nor'easter and beached herself near Asbury Park in 1934.

== 1940s and World War II ==
New Jersey shipyards were responsible for the construction of many naval ships, including battleships, aircraft carriers, heavy cruisers and destroyers. New Jersey received 9% of all allied war-related contracts throughout the World War II at Federal Shipbuilding and Drydock Company, and New York Shipbuilding Corporation in Camden During the war, Naval Weapons Station Earle in Monmouth County was opened for naval production, which provided ships with a safe port to take on ammunition. A German U-boat (U-869) was sunk off the coast of New Jersey in 1945.

Camp Kilmer was a staging area near New Brunswick serving the port of New York. Buildings were painted such that they had a camouflage effect. Camp Kilmer helped to serve troops by offering medical care and providing them with supplies. Camp Kilmer became inactive in 1949 but was reactivated for the Korean War. It again became inactive in 1955, but was reactivated for the 1956 Hungarian Revolution. Fort Dix was opened again for the training of soldiers for the war effort. Nearly 500,000 soldiers enlisted for the war, leading many women to take jobs in their husbands’ absences.

Millville Airport opened on August 2, 1941. It was called "America's First Defense Airport" because it was opened as a gunnery training area for fighter pilots. Over 1,500 pilots were trained for advanced aircraft fighting at this airport. Fort Hancock, New Jersey was also opened in Sandy Hook (New Jersey). Gunners in the fort prevented German submarines from entering New York Harbor.

An internment camp housing people of Japanese, German, and Italian descent was located in Gloucester City, New Jersey. In addition, Seabrook Farms, New Jersey took advantage of Japanese labor to increase productivity when the government allowed small groups of people from the internment camps to work there. At the end of World War II, the government closed down the internment camps, but many people from the camps continued to work at Seabrook Farms.

In 1947 the current version of the New Jersey State Constitution was ratified, reorganizing the state government. Governors were allowed to serve four years instead of three, and a bicameral Legislature was created, consisting of a 40-member Senate and an 80-member Assembly. The new State Constitution also returned the right of suffrage to females and blacks.

In 1947 the Trenton Six Case went to trial in Trenton, New Jersey. Six African American defendants were convicted by an all-white jury and sentenced to death for the murder of an elderly white shopkeeper based on coerced confessions.

== 1950s and 1960s ==
New Jersey Tricentennial Flag, designed in 1964 to celebrate the 300th anniversary of the establishment of the Province of New Jersey

In the 1950s, the Port Authority of New York and New Jersey planned and built the Port Newark-Elizabeth Marine Terminal in the cities of Newark and Elizabeth. This was the first port in the world to containerize due to the innovation of Malcolm McLean and the founding of the Sea-Land Corporation. The newly opened port quickly made the docks of Brooklyn, Lower Manhattan and Hoboken obsolete. In 1985 the port was the busiest in the world.

In the early 1950s, the cities of New Jersey began experiencing urban decay. Governments attempted to intervene with the urban decay, focusing on the office Gateway Center and several other projects. However, suburbs continued to grow. Revolts occurred, often due to frustration about the poor urban conditions. As urban decay started a gap between the wealthier suburbs and poorer cities, state income taxes were implemented to stop the gap. Around the 1970s, urbanization started increasing again.

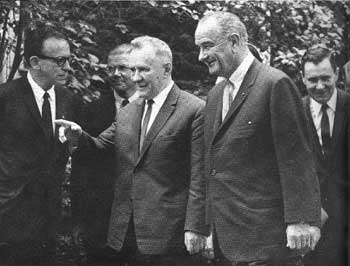
Lyndon Johnson meets Alexei Kosygin in Glassboro

During the 1960s, many African Americans felt disenfranchised. This feeling was exacerbated by police forces, which often sided against African Americans. This tension led to race riots, the first of which occurred in Jersey City on August 2, 1964, causing heavy damage to the Jersey City area. 71 stores were damaged and 46 people were injured. From August 11 to August 13, 1964, similar riots occurred in Paterson and Elizabeth. In the Paterson riot, twenty stores and other buildings were damaged, and eight people were injured. In the Elizabeth riot, six people were injured and seventeen stores were damaged. In the aftermath of these riots, 135 people were arrested.

In the middle of the Cold War from June 23 to June 25, 1967, president Lyndon Johnson met with Soviet premier Alexei Kosygin in Glassboro, New Jersey at the Glassboro State College. No specific agreements were reached, especially in the area of restrictions on anti-ballistic missile systems. However, the meeting helped improve the strained relationships between the Soviet Union and the US.

Also in the summer of 1967, urban residents, primarily African Americans, rioted for 5 days in Newark and the neighboring city of Plainfield. These two riots are known as the 1967 Newark riots and the 1967 Plainfield riots. The cause was the feeling that African Americans were being disenfranchised. 26 people died in the Newark riots, and nearly 1,600 were arrested. The riots are often cited as a major factor in the decline of Newark and its neighboring communities, as many residents fled to the suburbs following the riots. Race related violence would continue to plague the state with smaller riots occurring in Trenton in 1968, Camden in 1969, and Asbury Park in 1970.

== 1970s-1980s ==
Because of its strategic location on the East Coast, New Jersey played an important role in the United States' Cold War defense. 14 Nike anti-aircraft missile batteries in two groups were constructed in New Jersey to protect the metropolitan areas around Philadelphia and New York City. Also, a regional command center was built in New Jersey. By 1974, the missile sites became inactive. In addition to these, air defense radar sites, bases for interceptor aircraft, anti-aircraft gun batteries, surface-to-air missile sites, and command and control facilities were constructed to defend against an attack by long range, nuclear-armed aircraft of the Soviet Air Force.

== 1990s ==
In 1998, the Supreme Court of the United States ruled in the case of New Jersey v. New York that most of Ellis Island came under the jurisdiction of New Jersey. New York State disputed this claim and retains jurisdiction of a small portion of the island. The dispute has little practical effect since the federal government administers the island through the National Park Service.

== See also ==
- Mercer Pottery Company

== See also ==
- History of New Jersey
- New Jersey in the 19th century
