= New Jersey in the 21st century =

New Jersey in the 21st century has been deeply affected by terrorism and political controversy.

== September 11, 2001 ==
In the morning of September 11, 2001, hijackers took control of four domestic U.S. commercial airliners. All of the planes crashed, none of them in New Jersey; however, two of them crashed into the two tallest towers of the World Trade Center in New York City, which collapsed within two hours (and was seen from the Gold Coast in New Jersey), and Todd Beamer, of New Jersey, is thought to have played a role in bringing down Flight 93 short of the terrorists' intended target. The destruction of the twin towers could be seen from New Jersey. The official count records 2,986 deaths in the attacks, including around 700 residents of New Jersey. Over 160,000 people were evacuated from the Manhattan area to New Jersey because the subways had been closed down and PATH station had been closed down and were eventually destroyed in the collapse.

After the attack, the World Trade Center station remained closed for two years. The Exchange Place station was also forced to close due to the flooding of the PATH transit tunnel. PATH service to Lower Manhattan was restored in 2003 after the opening of a temporary station on the World Trade Center site. During the intervening time period, transit service to Lower Manhattan was largely provided by the rapid expansion of NY Waterway ferry service.

Many schools in New Jersey closed for the day, evacuated, or were locked-down. The destruction of 30% (28.7 million sq ft) of Lower Manhattan office space accelerated the pre-2001 trend of moving jobs from Lower Manhattan to Midtown and New Jersey. Many questioned whether this loss of jobs and its associated tax base would ever be restored.

== Anthrax attacks ==
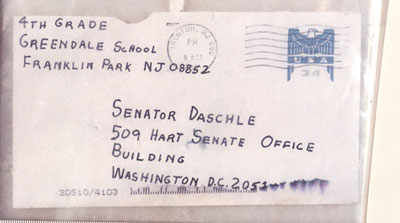
A letter sent to Senate Majority Leader Tom Daschle containing 'weaponized' anthrax powder caused the deaths of two postal workers.

Over several weeks in late 2001, seven letters, all bearing a Trenton, New Jersey postmark and containing anthrax bacteria, were mailed to several news media offices and two US Senators, resulting in the deaths of five people and causing twenty-two people to develop anthrax infections. The crime still remains unsolved.

The first set of anthrax letters were postmarked September 18, 2001, exactly one week after the September 11, 2001 attacks. Five letters are believed to have been mailed at this time, to ABC News, CBS News, NBC News and the New York Post, all in New York City; and the National Enquirer at American Media, Inc. (AMI) in Boca Raton, Florida. AMI also publishes a tabloid called Sun where Robert Stevens, the first person who died from the mailings, worked. Only the New York Post and NBC News letters were actually found; the existence of the other three letters is inferred from the pattern of infection. The anthrax found in the New York Post letter is reported to have become damp before being discovered. Scientists examining the anthrax from the New York Post letter said it appeared as a coarse brown granular material looking like Purina Dog Chow.

Two additional anthrax letters, bearing the same Trenton postmark, were dated October 9, three weeks after the first mailing. The letters were addressed to two Democratic Senators, Tom Daschle of South Dakota and Patrick Leahy of Vermont. More potent than the first anthrax letters, the material in the Senate letters was a highly refined dry powder consisting of approximately one gram of nearly pure spores. Some reports described the material in the Senate letters as "weaponized" or "weapons grade" anthrax. The Daschle letter was opened by an aide on October 15, and the government mail service was shut down. The unopened Leahy letter was discovered in an impounded mail bag on November 16. The Leahy letter had been misdirected to the State Department mail annex in Sterling, Virginia, due to a misread ZIP code; a postal worker there, David Hose, contracted inhalation anthrax.

Twenty-two people developed anthrax infections, eleven of the life-threatening inhalation variety. Five died of inhalation anthrax. In addition to the death of Robert Stevens in Florida, two died from unknown sources, possibly cross-contamination of mail: Kathy Nguyen, a Vietnamese immigrant from New York City; and Ottilie Lundgren, a 94-year-old woman from Oxford, Connecticut, who was the final victim. The two remaining deaths were employees of the Brentwood mail facility in Washington, D.C., Thomas Morris Jr. and Joseph Curseen.

Thousands of people took a two-month course of the antibiotic Cipro in an effort to preempt anthrax infections. Associated Press reported that members of Vice President Cheney's staff took Cipro a week before the first anthrax attack.

As of 2006, the investigation seems to have gone cold. Authorities have traveled to four different continents, interviewed more than 8,000 individuals and have issued over 5,000 subpoenas. The number of FBI agents assigned to the case is now 21, ten fewer than a year ago, and the number of postal inspectors investigating the case is nine.

== 2004-2005 Gubernatorial vacancy ==
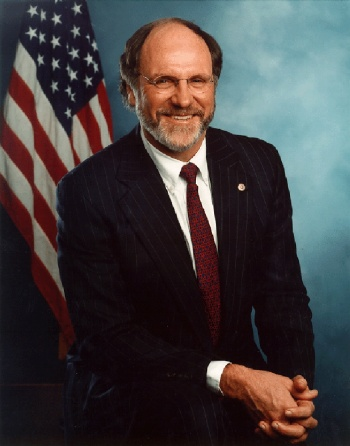
Former Governor Jon Corzine

Former Governor James E. McGreevey resigned on November 15, 2004, after charges of pay-to-play and extortion scandals involving the impropriety of the appointment of a homosexual love interest. New Jersey had no Lieutenant Governor position at the time, leaving a vacancy in the office. Senate President Richard Codey served as Acting Governor (then Governor) in McGreevey's place. Jon Corzine was elected Governor of New Jersey on November 8, 2005, and took office on January 17, 2006. On Election Day, November 8, 2005, the voters passed an amendment to the state constitution creating the position of Lieutenant Governor, effective with the 2009 elections.

== 2006 government shutdown ==
After the New Jersey Legislature and Governor Jon Corzine failed to agree on a state budget by the constitutional deadline, the state government shutdown beginning at midnight on July 1, 2006. Operation did not resume until the legislature adopted a budget on July 8.

== Civil unions legalized ==
A bill was passed legalizing Civil unions between homosexual couples, taking effect February 19, 2007. The bill grants all of the same rights as those granted to married heterosexual couples.

== Don Imus vs. Rutgers and the Corzine crash ==
Governor Jon Corzine was nearly killed in a car wreck on the Garden State Parkway in Galloway Township in 2007, as he was traveling to a meeting between a Rutgers sports team and radio personality Don Imus. Imus had called the Rutgers University women's basketball team "nappy-headed hos", leading to his firing by two communications networks. Imus met with the team at Drumthwacket to apologize, and Governor Corzine attempted to arrive at that meeting from Atlantic City, reaching speeds of at least 91 mph (146 km/h), without wearing a seatbelt. His chauffeur, a New Jersey State Police officer, lost control of the vehicle, seriously injuring the Governor and leading to a new period of acting governorship by Richard Codey while Corzine recuperated.

== 2010s ==
Chris Christie became governor in 2010 and promoted a number of budget cuts. At around the same time, a controversial television show called Jersey Shore began airing. It features the Jersey Shore and its inhabitants.

In October 2012, Hurricane Sandy made landfall near Atlantic City and caused devastation throughout the state, particularly at the Jersey Shore. At that time, widespread power outages lasted for days, while other areas were left powerless for over a week. Mantoloking and Seaside Heights were two of the most adversely affected towns by flooding.

In 2014, Super Bowl 48 took place at MetLife Stadium in East Rutherford, New Jersey.

In 2018, Phil Murphy became governor.

== 2020s ==
As with everywhere else, the year 2020 in New Jersey was largely overshadowed by the COVID-19 pandemic. There were over 2 million confirmed cases in New Jersey, and over 30,000 deaths, as schools and businesses were closed down in order to stop the virus's spread. Governor Phil Murphy lifted the COVID-19 health emergency in New Jersey in 2022.

In 2023, Lieutenant Governor Sheila Oliver suddenly died in office, and was replaced by Tahesha Way.

In 2024, U.S. Senator Bob Menendez was forced to resign after a corruption scandal. Menendez was sentenced to 11 years in prison. Voters elected Andy Kim to take his place.

From March 31 to April 1, 2025, Cory Booker, the now-senior U.S. Senator from New Jersey, delivered the longest speech in United States Senate history, at 25 hours and 5 minutes, in protest of the second presidency of Donald Trump. May 2025 saw a month-long crisis at Newark Liberty International Airport, and a strike that suspended NJ Transit's rail network for a weekend.

In 2026, Mikie Sherrill became Governor of New Jersey; she is the second woman (after Christine Todd Whitman) to hold that office.

MetLife Stadium hosted multiple matches for the 2026 FIFA World Cup, including the final.
