= Wallace Chapel AME Zion Church =

Historic church in New Jersey, United States

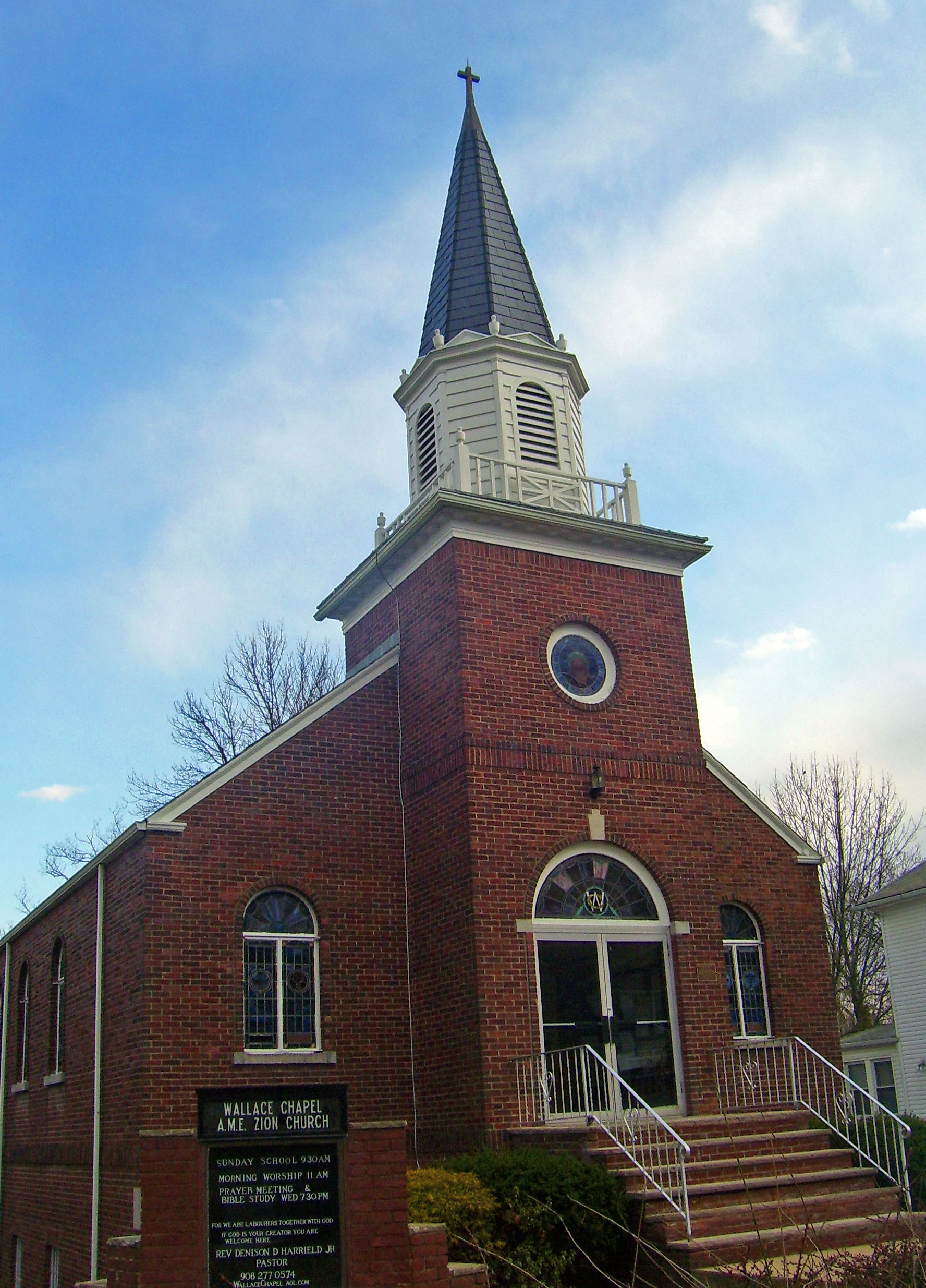
- Front elevation, 2008

Religion
- Affiliation: African Methodist Episcopal Zion Church

Location
- Location: Summit, NJ
- Interactive map of Wallace Chapel AME Zion Church
- Coordinates: 40°42′49″N 74°20′36″W

Architecture
- Groundbreaking: 1935
- Completed: 1937

Specifications
- Direction of façade: West
- Materials: Brick

U.S. National Register of Historic Places
- Added to NRHP: 2007
- NRHP Reference no.: 07000877

Wallace Chapel AME Zion Church is located at 138-142 Broad Street at the intersection of Broad and Orchard streets in Summit, Union County, New Jersey, United States. It was organized in 1923 and the church building was completed in 1937, the second black church in that city. It was listed on the New Jersey and National Registers of Historic Places in 2007. In 2008, the General Conference of The AME Zion Church designated Wallace Chapel AME Zion Church a Historical Landmark of the AME Zion Church.

The congregation was first established in 1923, and met at the local YMCA. Two years later, The Rev. Florence Spearing Randolph, a former suffragette and activist, was appointed temporary pastor. In 1928 the church acquired its first building, a small house on the church's current site with enough space on the first floor to seat a hundred people at services. This duplex house is now the parsonage and community house. Rev. Dr. Florence S. Randolph served as pastor of the church from 1925 until her retirement in 1946. Rev. Dr. Denison D. Harrield, Jr. was appointed as pastor of the church on October 1, 1989.

== Gallery ==
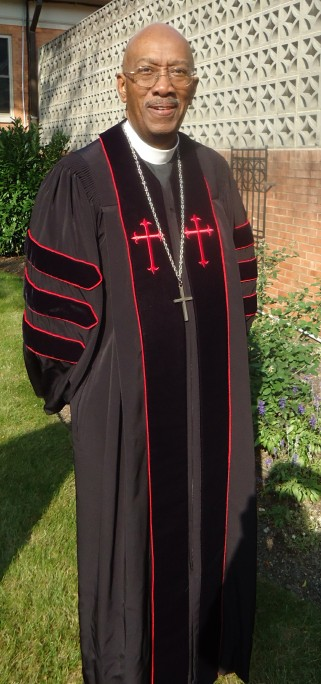
Reverend Dr. Denison D. Harrield, Jr.

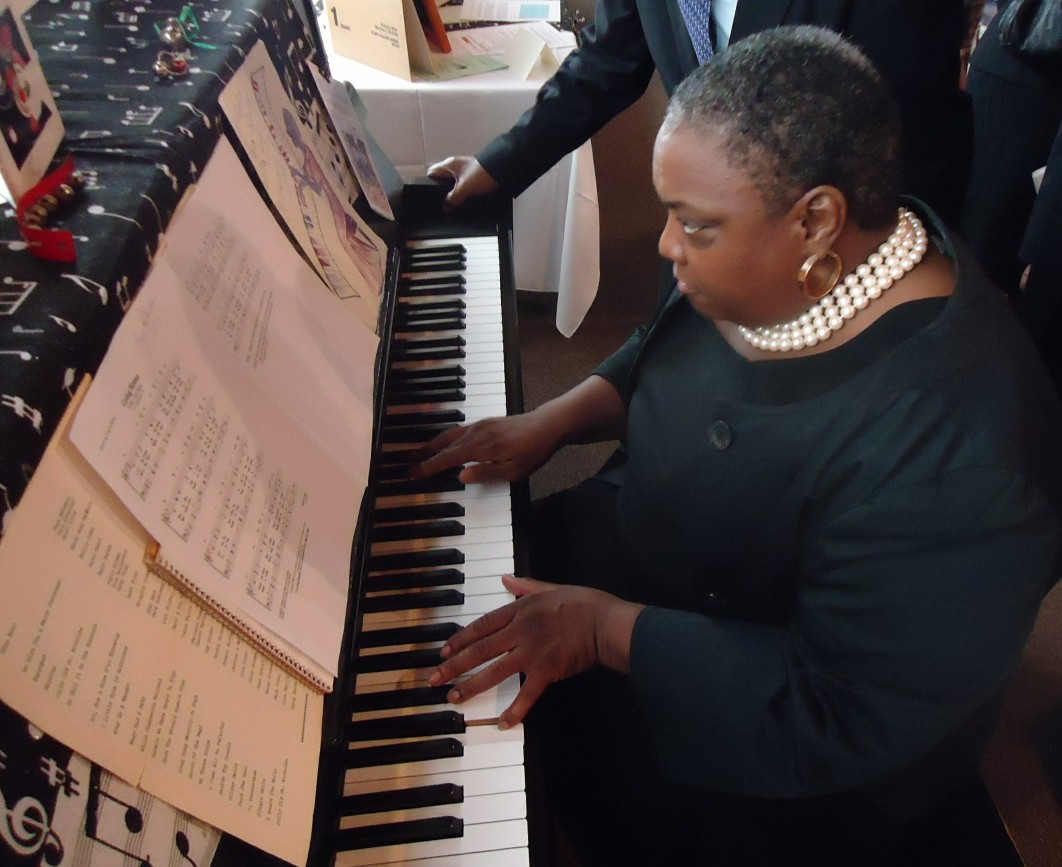
Music director Patricia Jackson.

== See also ==
- National Register of Historic Places listings in Union County, New Jersey
