= Florence Spearing Randolph =

American clubwoman, suffragist, and ordained minister

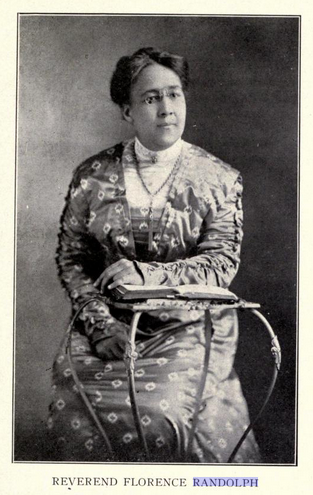
- Florence Spearing Randolph, from a 1919 publication.
- Born: Florence Spearing; August 9, 1866; Charleston, South Carolina
- Died: December 28, 1951 (aged 85)
- Education: Drew University, Livingstone College
- Occupation: Minister
- Spouse: Hugh Randolph (m. 1884–1913) his death

Florence Spearing Randolph (August 6 or August 9, 1866 – December 28, 1951) was an American clubwoman, suffragist, and ordained minister, pastor of the Wallace Chapel AME Zion Church in Summit, Union County, New Jersey, United States. from 1925 to 1946. She organized the New Jersey Federation of Colored Women's Clubs and was president of the New Jersey Women's Foreign Missionary Society.

== Early life ==
Florence Spearing was born in Charleston, South Carolina, the daughter of John Spearing and Anna Smith Spearing. Her father was a cabinetmaker. Spearing trained as a dressmaker and moved north to New Jersey, where she lived with her sister Lena for work. Later in life, she became the first African-American woman to enroll at Drew University. In 1933 she was awarded an Honorary Doctor of Divinity degree from Livingstone College.

== Career ==
Florence Spearing Randolph was one of the first women in the African Methodist Episcopal Zion Church denomination to be ordained as a deacon (1901) and as an elder (1903), and licensed to preach. She came to the Wallace Chapel as a temporary pastor in 1925; this arrangement was soon made permanent, and she was the church's pastor for over twenty years, until she retired in 1946. During her tenure, the church built its current building and paid the debts incurred, in full.

She was a delegate to an international ecumenical conference in London in 1901. As head of the New Jersey Women's Foreign Missionary Society, she set up a Bureau of Supplies to collect and distribute donations for missionaries. She also visited AMEZ missionaries in Liberia and Ghana, from 1922 to 1924. She mentored Charity Zormelo, an educator from Ghana.

Florence Spearing Randolph served on the executive board of the New Jersey Woman Suffrage Association. In 1915, she was founder and president of the New Jersey Federation of Colored Women's Clubs.

== Personal life and legacy ==
Florence Spearing married Hugh Randolph, a railroad cook, in 1884. Their daughter Leah Viola Randolph was born in 1887. She was widowed when Hugh Randolph died in 1913. Rev. Florence Spearing Randolph died in 1951, aged 85 years. Her granddaughter Anice Johnson Ward saved a suitcase of Rev. Randolph's papers, and in 1982 shared it with Temple University history professor Bettye Collier-Thomas; sermons from the suitcase were included in Collier-Thomas's Daughters of Thunder: Black Women Preachers and Their Sermons, 1850-1979 (1998).

There is a Reverend Florence Spearing Randolph Prize given by the Theological School at Drew University, in her memory. There is also a historical plaque explaining her career at the Wallace Chapel, placed there as part of the New Jersey Women's Heritage Trail. In 2015 the Women's Home and Missionary Society held a Founder's Day to celebrate the life of Randolph.
