= Outline of New Jersey =

Overview of and topical guide to New Jersey

The flag of New Jersey

The seal of New Jersey

The location of the State of New Jersey in the United States of America

The following outline is provided as an overview of and topical guide to the U.S. state of New Jersey:

New Jersey – U.S. state on the East coast of the United States, and the most densely populated state in the U.S. It was one of the original Thirteen Colonies that declared their independence in the American Revolution and formed the United States of America. It was named after the largest of the British Channel Islands, Jersey.

== General reference ==
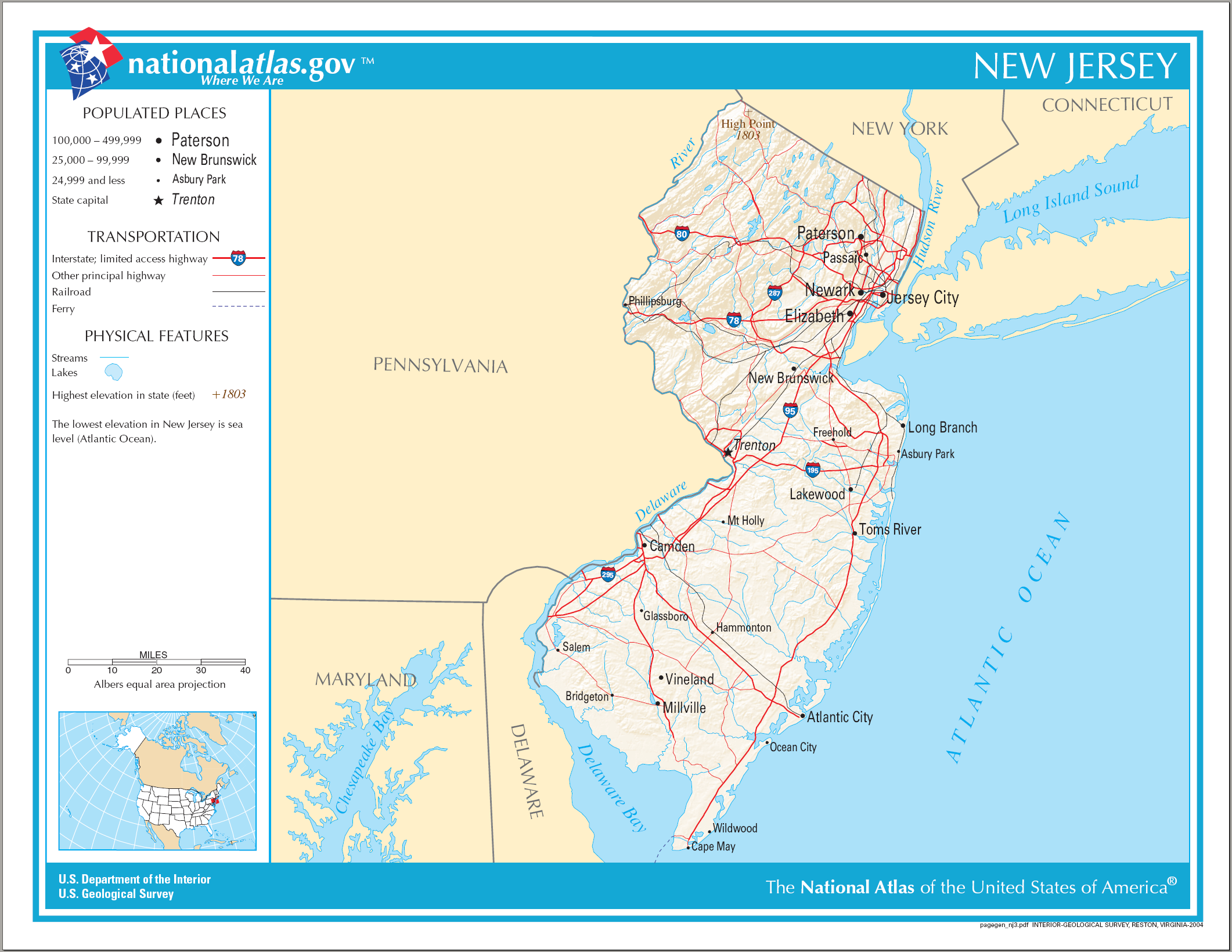
An enlargeable map of the State of New Jersey

- Names
  - Common name: New Jersey
  - Official name: State of New Jersey
  - Abbreviations and name codes
    - Postal symbol: NJ
    - ISO 3166-2 code: US-NJ
    - Internet second-level domain: .nj.us
  - Nicknames
    - Garden State (currently used on license plates)
    - The Crossroads of the Revolution (previously used on license plates)
    - The Tomato State
- Adjectival: New Jersey
- Demonyms
  - New Jerseyan
  - New Jerseyite

== Geography of New Jersey ==
Geography of New Jersey

- New Jersey is: a U.S. state, a federal state of the United States of America
- Location
  - Northern Hemisphere
  - Western Hemisphere
    - Americas
      - North America
        - Anglo America
        - Northern America
          - United States of America
            - Contiguous United States
              - Eastern United States
                - East Coast of the United States
                  - Northeastern United States
                  - Northeast megalopolis
                - Mid-Atlantic states
- Population of New Jersey: 8,791,894 (2010 U.S. Census)
- Area of New Jersey: 8,722.58 sq mi (22,591.38 km^{2})
- Atlas of New Jersey

=== Places in New Jersey ===
- List of municipalities in New Jersey
- Historic places in New Jersey
  - Ghost towns in New Jersey
  - National Historic Landmarks in New Jersey
  - National Register of Historic Places listings in New Jersey
    - Bridges on the National Register of Historic Places in New Jersey
- National Natural Landmarks in New Jersey
- National parks in New Jersey
- State parks in New Jersey

=== Environment of New Jersey ===
- Climate of New Jersey
- Geology of New Jersey
- Protected areas in New Jersey
  - State forests of New Jersey
- Superfund sites in New Jersey
- Wildlife of New Jersey
  - Fauna of New Jersey
    - Birds of New Jersey
    - Reptiles
      - Snakes of New Jersey

==== Natural geographic features of New Jersey ====
- Islands of New Jersey
- Lakes of New Jersey
- Mountains of New Jersey
- Rivers of New Jersey

=== Regions of New Jersey ===
- Central New Jersey, or Central Jersey
- Northern New Jersey, or North Jersey
  - Northeastern New Jersey, or the Gateway Region
  - Northwestern New Jersey, or the Skylands Region
- South Jersey
  - Southeastern New Jersey, or the Southern Shore Region and Greater Atlantic City
  - Southwestern New Jersey, or the Philadelphia metropolitan area
- Eastern New Jersey, or the Jersey Shore
- Western New Jersey, or Trenton, Mercer County

==== Administrative divisions of New Jersey ====
An enlargeable map of the 21 counties of the State of New Jersey

- The 21 Counties of the State of New Jersey
  - Municipalities in New Jersey
    - Cities in New Jersey
      - State capital of New Jersey:
      - City nicknames in New Jersey

=== Demography of New Jersey ===
Demographics of New Jersey

== Government and politics of New Jersey ==
Politics of New Jersey

- Form of government: U.S. state government
- New Jersey's congressional delegations
- New Jersey State Capitol
- Elections in New Jersey
  - Electoral reform in New Jersey
- Political party strength in New Jersey

=== Branches of the government of New Jersey ===
Government of New Jersey

==== Executive branch of the government of New Jersey ====
- Governor of New Jersey
  - Lieutenant Governor of New Jersey
  - Secretary of State of New Jersey
  - New Jersey Attorney General
- State departments
  - New Jersey Department of Agriculture
  - New Jersey Department of Banking and Insurance
  - New Jersey Department of Children and Families
  - New Jersey Department of Community Affairs
  - New Jersey Department of Corrections
  - New Jersey Department of Education
  - New Jersey Department of Environmental Protection
  - New Jersey Department of Health and Senior Services
  - New Jersey Department of Human Services
  - New Jersey Department of Labor and Workforce Development
  - New Jersey Department of Law and Public Safety
  - New Jersey Department of Military Affairs
  - New Jersey Department of State
  - New Jersey Department of Transportation
  - New Jersey Department of the Treasury
  - New Jersey Department of Veterans Affairs

==== Legislative branch of the government of New Jersey ====
- New Jersey Legislature (bicameral)
  - Upper house: New Jersey Senate
  - Lower house: New Jersey General Assembly

==== Judicial branch of the government of New Jersey ====
Courts of New Jersey

- Supreme Court of New Jersey

=== Law and order in New Jersey ===
Law of New Jersey

- Cannabis in New Jersey
- Capital punishment in New Jersey
  - Individuals executed in New Jersey
- Constitution of New Jersey
- Crime in New Jersey
- Gun laws in New Jersey
- Law enforcement in New Jersey
  - Law enforcement agencies in New Jersey
    - New Jersey State Police
  - State Prisons in New Jersey
- Same-sex marriage in New Jersey
- Taxation in New Jersey

=== Military in New Jersey ===
- New Jersey Air National Guard
- New Jersey Army National Guard

=== Local government in New Jersey ===
Local government in New Jersey

== History of New Jersey ==
History of New Jersey

=== History of New Jersey, by period ===
- Prehistory of New Jersey
- Netherlands colony of Nieuw-Nederland, 1624–1664
  - Bergen, New Netherland
- Swedish colony of Nya Sverige, 1638–1655
- English Province of New-York, (1664)
- English Province of New-Jersey, 1664–1673
- Third Anglo-Dutch War, 1672–1674
  - Netherlands military government of Nieuw-Nederland, 1673–1674
  - Treaty of Westminster of 1674
- English Province of East Jersey 1674–1688
- English Province of West Jersey 1674–1688
- English Dominion of New-England in America, 1688–1689
- English Province of East Jersey 1689–1702
- English Province of West Jersey 1689–1702
- English Province of New-Jersey 1702–1707
- British Province of New-Jersey, 1707–1776
  - King George's War, 1740–1748
    - Treaty of Aix-la-Chapelle of 1748
  - French and Indian War, 1754–1763
    - Treaty of Paris of 1763
- American Revolutionary War, April 19, 1775 – September 3, 1783
  - New York and New Jersey campaign, July 3, 1776 – July 26, 1777
    - Battle of Trenton, December 26, 1776
  - United States Declaration of Independence, July 4, 1776
  - Treaty of Paris, September 3, 1783
- State of New Jersey since 1776
    - Eleventh state to ratify the Articles of Confederation and Perpetual Union, signed November 26, 1778
  - Third State to ratify the Constitution of the United States of America on December 18, 1787
- New Jersey in the 19th century
  - War of 1812, June 18, 1812 – March 23, 1815
    - Treaty of Ghent, December 24, 1814
  - American Civil War, April 12, 1861 – May 13, 1865
    - New Jersey in the American Civil War
  - Grover Cleveland becomes 22nd President of the United States on March 4, 1885
  - Grover Cleveland also becomes 24th President of the United States on March 4, 1893
- New Jersey in the 20th century
  - Woodrow Wilson becomes 28th President of the United States on March 4, 1913
- New Jersey in the 21st century

=== History of New Jersey, by region ===
- By city
  - History of Newark, New Jersey

=== History of New Jersey, by subject ===
- History of Ku Klux Klan in New Jersey
- History of the New Jersey State Constitution
- List of New Jersey state legislatures
- History of slavery in New Jersey
- History of transportation in New Jersey
  - History of state highways in New Jersey (pre-1927)

== Culture of New Jersey ==
Culture of New Jersey

- Cuisine of New Jersey
- List of people from New Jersey
- Halls of fame in New Jersey
- Museums in New Jersey
- New Jersey English
- Religion in New Jersey
  - Baptist Convention of Pennsylvania/South Jersey
  - Church of the Brethren (Atlantic Northeast District)
  - Episcopal Diocese of New Jersey
  - Episcopal Diocese of Newark
  - New Jersey District (LCMS) (Lutheran Church – Missouri Synod)
  - New Jersey Synod (ELCA) (Evangelical Lutheran Church in America)
  - Orthodox Church in America Diocese of New York and New Jersey
  - Roman Catholic Archdiocese of Newark
  - Roman Catholic Diocese of Camden
  - Roman Catholic Diocese of Metuchen
  - Roman Catholic Diocese of Paterson
  - Roman Catholic Diocese of Trenton
  - Byzantine Catholic Eparchy of Passaic
  - Syrian Catholic Eparchy of Our Lady of Deliverance of Newark
- Scouting in New Jersey
- State symbols of New Jersey
  - Flag of the State of New Jersey
  - Great Seal of the State of New Jersey

=== The arts in New Jersey ===
- Music of New Jersey

== Economy and infrastructure of New Jersey ==
Economy of New Jersey

- Communications in New Jersey
  - Newspapers in New Jersey
  - Radio stations in New Jersey
  - Television stations in New Jersey
- Energy in New Jersey
  - Power stations in New Jersey
  - Solar power in New Jersey
  - Wind power in New Jersey
- Health care in New Jersey
  - Hospitals in New Jersey
- Transportation in New Jersey
  - Airports in New Jersey
  - List of New Jersey railroads
  - Roads in New Jersey
    - State highways in New Jersey

== Education in New Jersey ==
Education in New Jersey

- Schools in New Jersey
  - School districts in New Jersey
    - High schools in New Jersey
  - Colleges and universities in New Jersey
    - Rutgers, The State University of New Jersey
    - Princeton University

== See also ==
- Topic overview:
  - New Jersey
  - Index of New Jersey-related articles
