= History of New Jersey =

The history of New Jersey begins at the end of the Younger Dryas, about 15,000 years ago. Native Americans moved into New Jersey soon after the reversal of the Younger Dryas; before then an ice sheet hundreds of feet thick had made the area of northern New Jersey uninhabitable.

European contact began with the exploration of the Jersey Shore by Giovanni da Verrazzano in 1524. At the time of European contact, many tribes of the Lenape lived in the area.

In the 17th century, the New Jersey region came under the control of the Swedes and the Dutch, resulting in a struggle in which the Dutch proved victorious (1655). However, the English seized the Dutch colony of New Netherland in 1664, renaming it the Province of New Jersey. New Jersey became one of the Thirteen Colonies which broke away from Britain in the American Revolution, adopting the Declaration of Independence in 1776. Becoming a state upon the formation of the United States, New Jersey saw significant action during the American Revolutionary War. New Jersey's delegates signed the Articles of Confederation in 1779. Princeton acted as the nation's capital for four months in 1783, while Trenton served as the capital in November and December 1784. Trenton was also under consideration as the permanent U.S. capital, along with New York City and Philadelphia, before southern states, led by Thomas Jefferson, pushed for a capital to be established south of the Potomac River.

In 1787, New Jersey became the third state to ratify the U.S. Constitution.

In the 19th century, New Jersey cities helped lead the U.S. into the Industrial Revolution. This industrial growth helped New Jersey become an important center of manufacturing and transportation. New Jersey soldiers fought in many U.S. wars in the 19th century, including 88,000 soldiers who served in the Union army during the American Civil War. The state also became a component of the Underground Railroad. The state's transportation system continued to improve with the construction of canals and more rail lines that helped industrialization develop further. During the early 20th century New Jersey prospered, but the economy weakened in the Great Depression of the year of 1930 During World War II (1939–1945) and the Cold War (c. 1947–1991), New Jersey's shipyards and military bases played an important role in the defense of the United States. In the 1960s, New Jersey became the site of several race riots and of the Glassboro Summit Conference (1967), between American President Lyndon B. Johnson and Soviet Premier Alexei Kosygin.

== Paleo-Indians and Native Americans ==
Paleo-Indians first settled in the area of present-day New Jersey after the Wisconsin Glacier melted around 13,000 B.C. The Zierdt site in Montague, Sussex County and the Plenge site along the Musconetcong River in Franklin Township, Warren County, and the Dutchess Cave in Orange County, New York, represent camp sites of Paleo-Indians. Paleo Indians were hunter-gatherers, hunting game and gathering plants for eating. They moved as soon as game or plants became scarce.

The Woodland period of North American pre-Columbian cultures spans the time period from roughly 1000 BCE to 1,000 CE in the eastern part of North America. The Hopewell tradition summarizes the common aspects of the Native American culture that flourished along rivers in the Northeastern United States from 200 BCE to 500 CE.

Later other Native Americans settled in New Jersey. Around the year 1000, a Native American group known as the Lenape, later called Delaware Indians, settled in New Jersey. They came from the Mississippi valley. The Lenape formed loosely organized groups who at first migrated seasonally. With the advent of the bow-and-arrow and of pottery around the year 500 A.D., extended family groups began to stay in areas longer. They practiced small-scale agriculture (companion planting), such as growing corn and pole beans together and squash. They were hunting and gathering, hunting with bow-and-arrow, and using deadfall traps and snares. They also gathered nuts in the autumn such as acorns, hickory nuts, walnuts, butternuts, beech nuts and chestnuts. The Native Americans and Paleo-Indians fished in all rivers and streams using nets and fish hooks and by hand. They also fished in the region surrounding the Delaware River, the lower Hudson River, and western Long Island Sound. Traces of their Algonquian language survive in many place-names throughout the state.

== European exploration ==
In 1524, Giovanni da Verrazzano, sailing in the service of France, explored the Jersey Shore including Sandy Hook and The Narrows, now the site of the Verrazano–Narrows Bridge. In 1609, Henry Hudson sailing for the Dutch East India Company, explored the East Coast in the Halve Maen including Delaware Bay, Raritan Bay, Newark Bay, New York Bay and the Hudson Valley. Over the next five years, on somewhat secretive missions, Adriaen Block, Hendrick Christiaensz and Cornelis Jacobsz May explored and mapped the coast from Cape May to Cape Cod, naming the area New Netherland.

== Colonial history ==
=== New Netherland ===
Modern map which approximates the relative size and location of the settled colonial-era areas of New Netherland and New Sweden

Initially, the Dutch built small trading posts for the fur trade. In May 1624, a ship under the command of Cornelius Jacobsen May (for whom Cape May is named) carried thirty families who were required to spread themselves throughout the region including at Fort Wilhelmus located on the east bank of the South River (Delaware River) and the site of the first European settlement in what would become New Jersey. Later another more substantial trading post was built at Fort Nassau.

The next European settlement was established on the banks of the Upper New York Bay across the North River (Hudson River) from Fort Amsterdam (on Manhattan) in 1630. Located at Paulus Hook, it was part of the patroonship of Pavonia, formed from land owned by Michiel Pauw, a Dutch businessman and patroon who had bought the tract from the Lenape. The settlement grew slowly, impeded by mismanagement by the Dutch West India Company and conflicts with the indigenous population such as Kieft's War and the Peach War. In 1658, the Director-General of New Netherland, Peter Stuyvesant, "re-purchased" the entire peninsula known as Bergen Neck, and granted a charter to the village at Bergen in 1661, establishing the oldest municipality in the state. The British conquest of New Netherland in 1664 ended Dutch control, however, North Jersey would retain a "Dutch" character for many years.

=== New Sweden ===
Part of southwestern New Jersey was settled by the Swedes by the mid-17th century. New Sweden, founded in 1638, rose to its height under governor Johan Björnsson Printz (1643–53). Led by Printz, the settlement extended along both sides of the Delaware River from Delaware Bay to the Schuylkill. Printz helped to improve the military and commercial status of the colony by constructing Fort Nya Elfsborg, near present-day Salem. This action prevented the river from being settled by the English and Dutch, who were trying to expand into the region. The Swedish and Finnish colonists generally lived in peace with their Dutch and Lenape neighbors. C. A. Nothnagle Log House and Schorn Log Cabin are remainders of this early influence. New Sweden's colonial population may have peaked at 368 people in 1654, after being boosted by more than 250 people along with a new governor Johan Rising, however, this was not enough to stave off Director-General Stuyvesant and 317 Dutch soldiers the next year.

=== Province of New Jersey ===
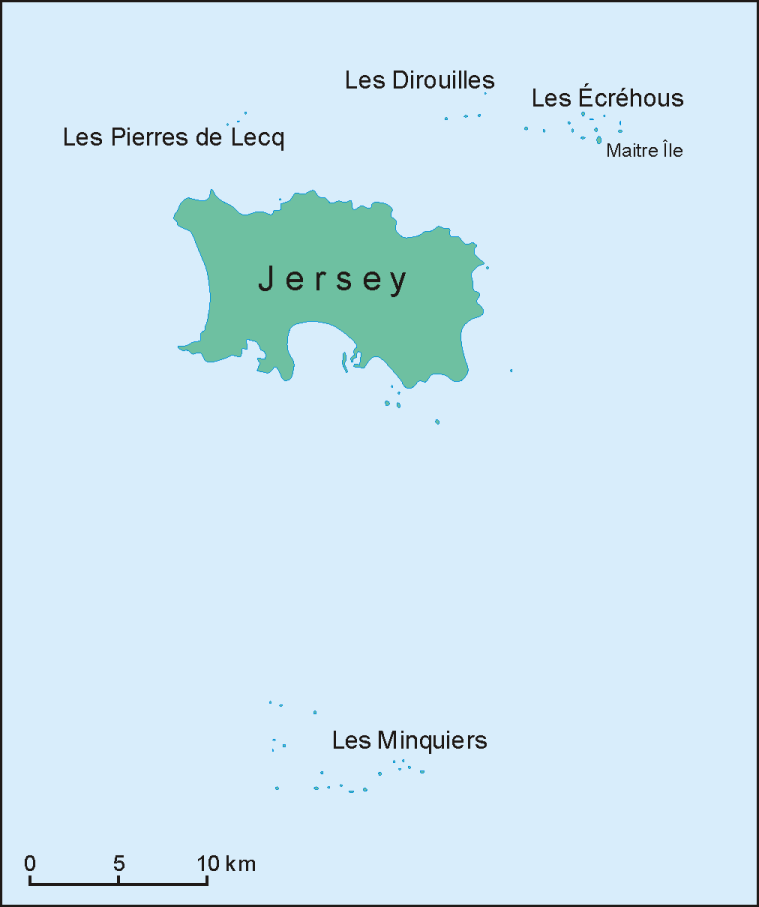
New Jersey is named after the English Channel island of Jersey.

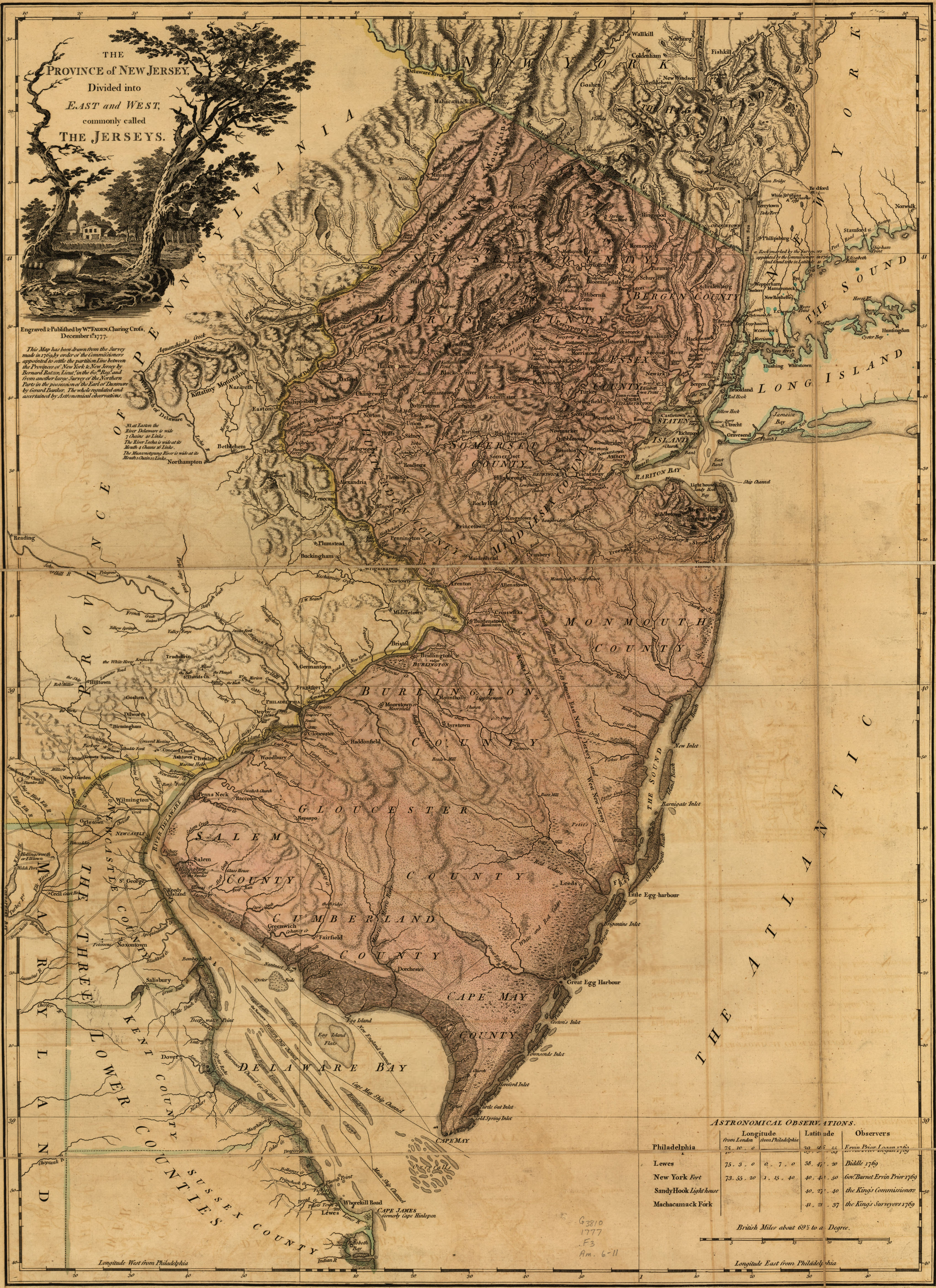
The Province of New Jersey, Divided into East and West, commonly called The Jerseys, a 1777 map by William Faden

From the colony of New Netherland, the Dutch interfered with Britain's transatlantic trade with its North American colonies. Insisting that John Cabot had been the first to discover North America, the British granted the land that now encompasses New Jersey to the Duke of York (later James II & VII), who ordered Colonel Richard Nicolls to take over the area. In September 1664, a British fleet under Nicolls' command sailed into what is now New York Harbor and seized the colony. The British encountered little resistance, perhaps due to the unpopularity of the Dutch governor, Peter Stuyvesant. After capturing the colony, Nicolls became deputy-governor of New Amsterdam and the rest of New Netherland, and guaranteed colonists' property rights, laws of inheritance, and the enjoyment of religious freedom. New Netherland west of the Hudson River was renamed New Jersey after the English Channel island of Jersey which Charles II of England, after having seen their loyalty to the crown, gave to the people of Jersey as a reward for having given him hospitality in the castle of Mont Orgueil before he was proclaimed king in 1649. The city of New Amsterdam was renamed New York (after the Duke of York).

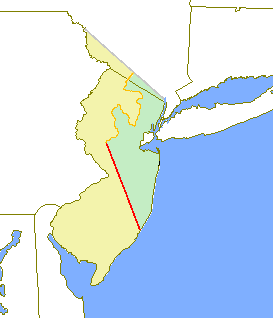
The original provinces of West and East New Jersey shown in yellow and green respectively. The Keith Line is shown in red, and the Coxe and Barclay Line is shown in orange.

Charles II gave the region between New England and Maryland to his brother, the Duke of York (later King James II & VII), as a proprietary colony. Later James granted the land between the Hudson River and the Delaware River that would become New Jersey to two friends who had been loyal to him through the English Civil War: Sir George Carteret and Lord Berkeley of Stratton. The two proprietors of New Jersey tried to entice more settlers to New Jersey by granting land to settlers and by passing Concession and Agreement, a document granting religious freedom to all inhabitants of New Jersey; the British Church of England allowed no such religious freedom. In return for land, settlers paid annual fees known as quitrents. The proprietors appointed Philip Carteret as the first governor of New Jersey, who designated Elizabethtown as the colony's capital. However, the two proprietors found collecting the quitrents difficult, and on March 18, 1674, Berkeley sold his share of New Jersey to the Quakers.

This sale divided the province into East Jersey and West Jersey. The exact line between West and East Jersey generally corresponded to the Keith Line between present day South and North Jersey and was created by George Keith. However, the line was constantly the subject of disputes. With the 1676 Quintipartite Deed more accurate surveys and maps were made resulting in the Thornton Line, drawn around 1696, and the Lawrence Line, drawn around 1743, which was adopted as the final line for legal purposes.

Many of the colonists of New Jersey became farmers. However, despite the fertility of the soil, farmers were forced to struggle due to the dearth of English money. Some owned slaves or had indentured servants work for them. The majority of the colonists lived in simple log cabins, coming from the original Dutch settlers. Since New Jersey was ideally located next to the Atlantic Ocean, colonists farmed, fished, and traded by sea. Transportation was slow and difficult usually on either foot or horseback. Education came through small religious schools, private academies, or tutors.

On April 15, 1702, under the reign of Queen Anne, West and East Jersey were reunited as a royal colony. Edward Hyde, Lord Cornbury became the first governor of the colony as a royal colony. Lord Cornbury was an ineffective and corrupt ruler, taking bribes and speculating on land, so in 1708 he was recalled to England. New Jersey was then ruled by the governors of New York, but this infuriated the settlers of New Jersey, who accused those governors of favoritism to New York. Judge Lewis Morris led the case for a separate governor, and was appointed governor by King George II in 1738. From 1701 to 1765, New Jersey's border with New York was in dispute, resulting in a series of skirmishes and raids.

In 1746, the College of New Jersey (now Princeton University) was founded in Elizabethtown by a group of Great Awakening "New Lighters" that included Jonathan Dickinson, Aaron Burr Sr. and Peter Van Brugh Livingston. In 1756, the school moved to Princeton.

== American Revolution ==
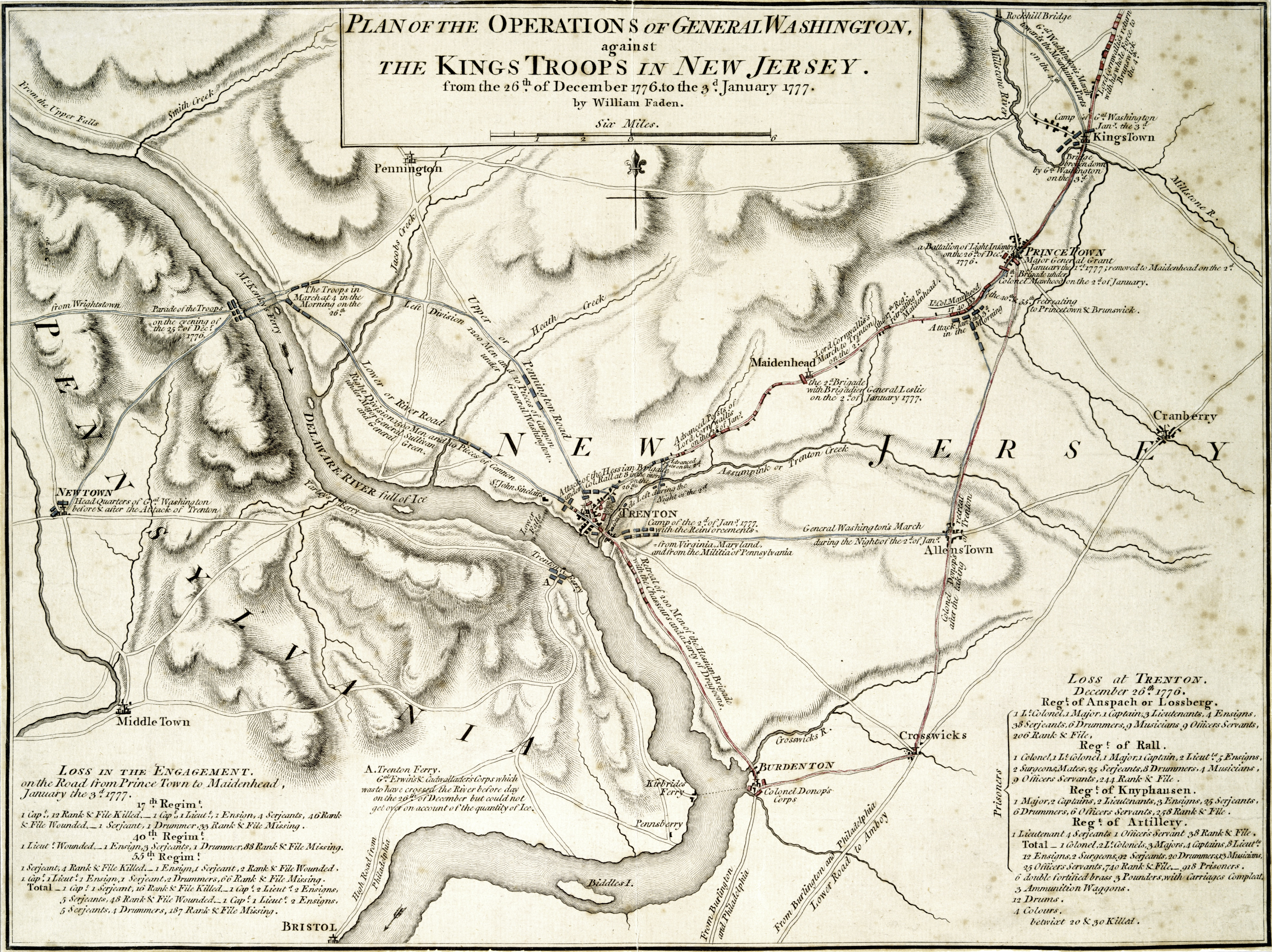
A mil military map by William Faden indicating troop movements during the Ten Crucial Days

New Jersey was one of the original Thirteen Colonies that joined in the struggle for independence from Great Britain. Many of the New Jersey settlers still felt ties of loyalty to the British crown, and many enslaved people sided with the British in exchange for freedom. The loyalists included the governor of New Jersey, William Franklin.

On July 2, 1776, the first Constitution of New Jersey was drafted, creating a basic framework for the state government. The New Jersey Constitution of 1776 allowed "all inhabitants of this Colony, of full age, who are worth fifty pounds proclamation money" to vote, including non-whites and widows; married women could not own property under the common law. The Constitution declared itself temporary and to be void if there was reconciliation with Great Britain. Both political parties in elections mocked the other for relying on "petticoat electors" for allowing women to vote. The right to vote was restricted to white males in 1807. Only two days after the new constitution was enacted, on July 4, 1776, the Declaration of Independence was endorsed by five representatives from New Jersey.

New Jersey is referred to as the "Crossroads of the Revolution" because the British and Continental armies fought several crucial battles there. Throughout the war hundreds of engagements occurred in New Jersey, more than in any other colony. Five major battles were fought at Trenton, Princeton, Monmouth, Union and Springfield. The Battles of Trenton and Princeton are collectively referred to as the Ten Crucial Days because these desperately needed victories bolstered the morale of the nation.

On the night of December 25–26, 1776, the Continental Army, commanded by General George Washington, made the famous crossing of the Delaware River. The scene was immortalized in Emanuel Gottlieb Leutze's painting Washington Crossing the Delaware, and displayed on the New Jersey State Quarter. In the Battle of Trenton which followed the crossing, the American soldiers surprised the Hessians, capturing nearly 900 prisoners in 90 minutes and taking supplies that had been meant for the British army. After the victory, George Washington led the army back across the Delaware River into Pennsylvania.

A few days later, British General Charles Cornwallis hoped to engage Washington's army at Trenton after Washington recrossed the Delaware River, resulting in the Second Battle of Trenton. After recapturing Trenton, he ordered charges on fortified defenses at Assunpink Creek. The Americans inflicted heavy casualties on the British from their defenses. Later, the Continental army slipped past Cornwallis's stalled army and launched an attack on British soldiers stationed at Princeton in the Battle of Princeton on January 3, 1777. The British at Princeton were forced to surrender. Cornwallis immediately ordered his army to engage the Americans at Princeton, but was prevented by snipers. These victories forced the British to leave New Jersey.

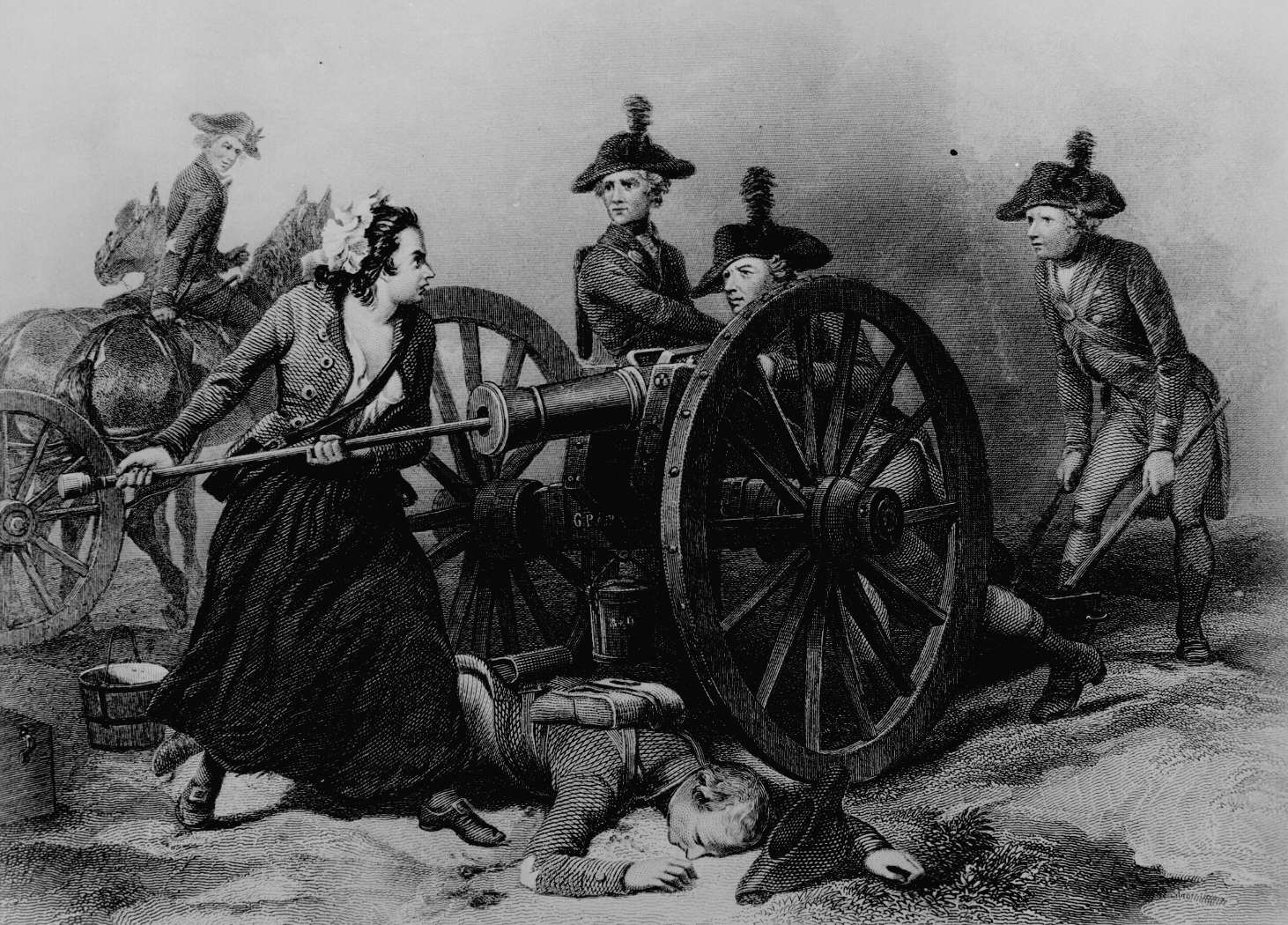
Molly Pitcher at the Battle of Monmouth

On June 28, 1778, the Continental Army under George Washington met a British column under Sir Henry Clinton at the Battle of Monmouth. Washington hoped to surprise and overwhelm the rear of the British army. General Charles Lee led the American attack on the British rear but retreated prematurely when the British attempted to flank the Americans. The retreat nearly led to disorder, but Washington managed to rally the troops to withstand two British counter-attacks, both of which failed. As temperatures increased to over 100 °F (38 °C), many soldiers fell to sunstroke. After the battle, Charles Lee was court-martialed for his poor command. Over 1,000 British casualties were incurred while the Americans lost 452 men. It was during this battle that the legendary "Molly Pitcher" is said to have fought.

The last major battle to take place in New Jersey during the Revolutionary War (and for the rest of the history of New Jersey) was the Battle of Springfield. Baron von Knyphausen, the Hessian general, hoped to invade New Jersey and expected support from colonists of New Jersey who were tired of the war. He hoped to secure Hobart Gap, from which he could attack the American headquarters in Morristown. On June 23, 1780, the British attacked soldiers under the command of Nathanael Greene. General Greene successfully stopped a two-pronged attack from entrenchments held across the Raritan River, preventing the British invasion.

New Jersey ratified and then signed the Articles of Confederation on November 26, 1779. In the summer of 1783, the Continental Congress met in Nassau Hall of Princeton University. It had originally convened in Philadelphia, Pennsylvania, but mutinous troops prevented the meeting from taking place. Princeton became the temporary capital for the nation for four months. During the brief stay in Princeton, the Continental Congress was informed of the end of the war by the signing of the Treaty of Paris on September 3, 1783. On December 18, 1787, New Jersey became the third state to ratify the United States Constitution, and on November 20, 1789, New Jersey became the first state in the Nation to ratify the United States Bill of Rights.

New Jersey played a major role in creating the structure of the new United States Government. When Virginia delegates proposed a plan calling for representation based on the population of each state, the smaller states refused, fearing that with such a plan they would no longer have a say in government affairs. William Paterson, a New Jersey statesman, introduced the New Jersey Plan, by which one vote would be given to each state, providing equal representation within the legislative body. The Great Compromise accepted both plans, creating two separate bodies in the Congress.

== Nineteenth century ==
=== Industrial Revolution ===
The economy of New Jersey was largely based on agriculture, but crop failures and poor soil plagued the settlers of New Jersey. However, New Jersey eventually funded publications in the early 1850s of accurate agriculture-related surveys through the effort of George Hammell Cook. The publication of this survey helped to increase the state's involvement in agricultural research and direct support to farmers. As agriculture became a less reliable source of income for New Jerseyans, many began turning towards more industrialized methods.

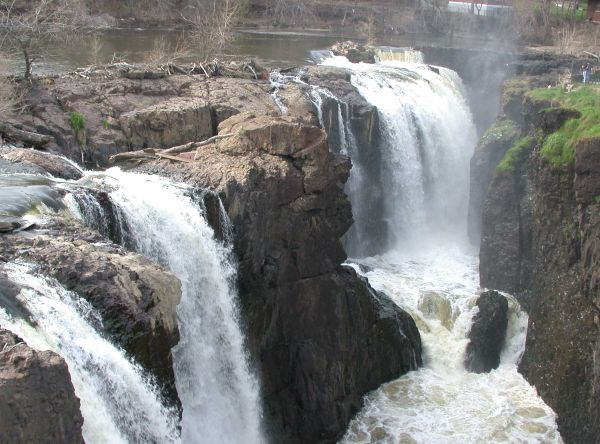
The Great Falls of the Passaic River

Paterson became the cradle of the Industrial Revolution in America. Energy was harnessed from the 77 feet (23 m) high Great Falls of the Passaic River. The city became an important site for mills and other industries. These include the textile, firearms, silk, and railroad locomotive manufacturing industries. Because of its high silk production, it became nicknamed the "Silk City". In 1835, Samuel Colt began producing firearms in the city.

The second version of the New Jersey State Constitution was written in 1844. The constitution provided suffrage only to white males, removing it from all women and from people of other races. Suffrage had been awarded to those groups under the original New Jersey State Constitution of 1776. Some important components of the second State Constitution include the separation of the powers of the executive, legislative, and judicial branches. The new constitution also provided a bill of rights. Underneath the constitution, the people had the right to elect the governor.

The famous inventor Thomas Edison was born in 1847. Edison worked in Menlo Park, and was known as "the Wizard of Menlo Park" for his many inventions; over the course of his life, he was granted 1,093 patents. His most famous inventions included the phonograph, the kinetoscope, the stock ticker, the Dictaphone and the tattoo gun. He also is credited with improving the designs of the incandescent light bulb, radio, the telegraph, and the telephone. He started the Motion Picture Patents Company. One of his famous sayings was, "Genius is one percent inspiration and 99% perspiration", as his efforts consisted of research and testing.

The agricultural products from New Jersey usually were transported to larger markets in New York City and Philadelphia, requiring better transportation. The first ocean-going steamboat went from Hoboken, New Jersey, sailed around southern New Jersey, and ended in Philadelphia. Later, systems of canals were built, the first of which is called the Morris Canal and ran from Phillipsburg, New Jersey, on the Delaware River to Jersey City, New Jersey, on the Hudson River. The Delaware and Raritan canal ran from New Brunswick, New Jersey, on the Raritan River, to Bordentown, New Jersey, on the Delaware River. Locomotion was also improved; Hoboken-born inventor John Stevens built a 10-ton locomotive and his son Robert L. Stevens started constructing iron railroads. By 1833, The Camden & Amboy Railroad had been completed, allowing a 7-hour passage between Philadelphia and New York City. Through the 1800s, over a dozen companies were operating railroad lines.

=== Second Party System ===
In the nation's early history New Jersey was primarily a Federalist/Whig state like most of the smaller states as they supported the idea of a strong Federal government to protect their interests over those of the larger states. Historians have examined the emergence of the Second Party System at the state and local level. For example, Bruce Bendler argues that in New Jersey the same dramatic changes that were reshaping the rest of the country were especially pointed in that state in the 1820s. A new political system emerged by the end of the decade as voters polarized in support or opposition to Jackson. By the mid-1830s the Democrats and the Whigs had fully mobilized practically all of the voters into pro- and anti-Jackson coalitions. Furthermore, the "Market Revolution" was well underway, as industrialization and upgraded transportation networks made the larger picture more important than the local economy, and entrepreneurs and politicians became leaders in speeding up the changes. For example, William N. Jeffers of Salem County, New Jersey, built his political success on leadership with the Jacksonian forces at the local level, while at the same time building his fortune with a bank charter and building a steam mill. At the national level, New Jersey remained resistant to the Democratic Party during the Second Party System; although Jackson carried the state in the 1832 presidential election, it voted for the Whig candidate in the following four elections. With the demise of the Whigs in the 1850s New Jersey became a Democratic state.

=== War and slavery ===
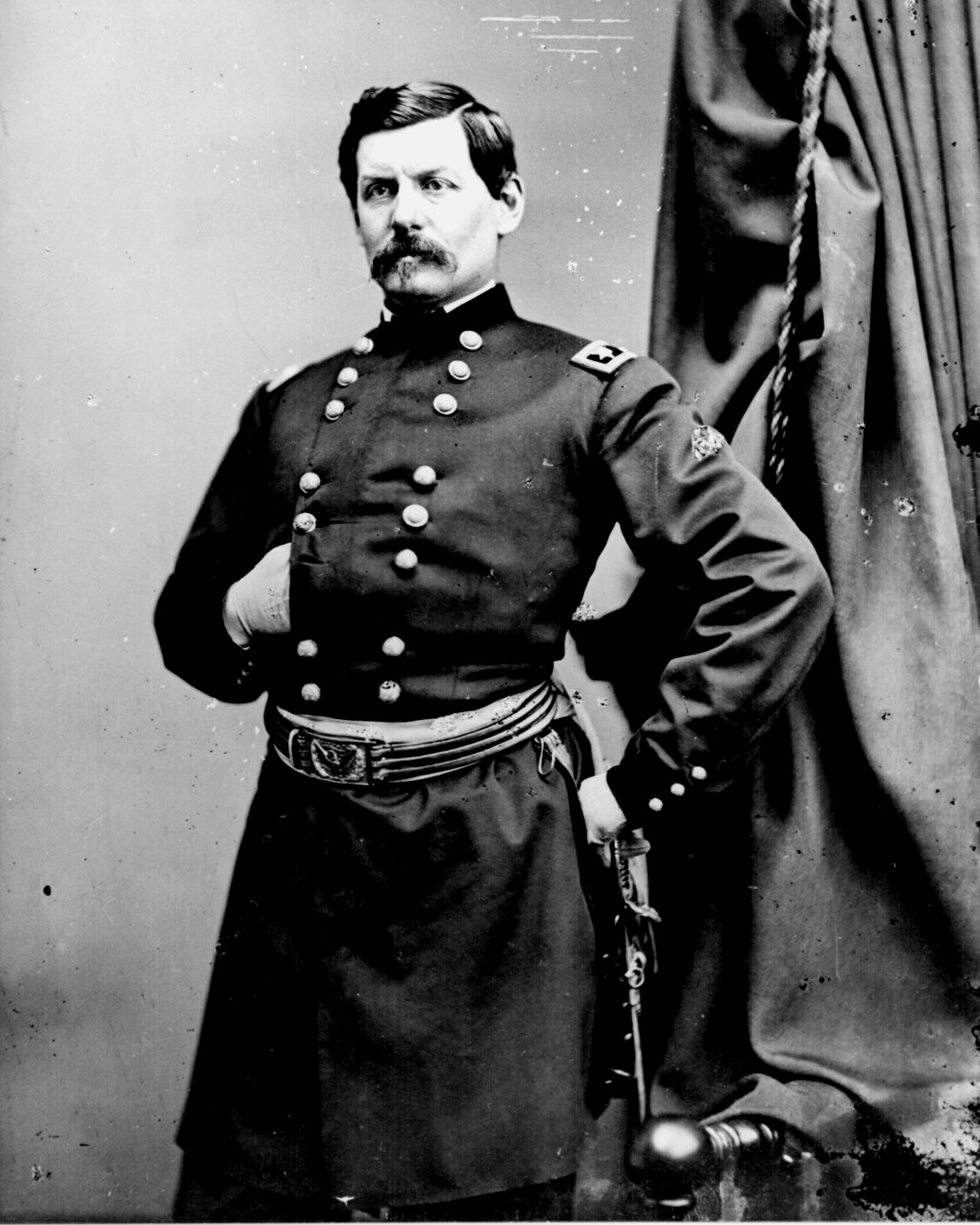
George B. McClellan, a Union army soldier during the Civil War, civil engineer, railroad executive, and politician who served as the 24th governor of New Jersey

During the Mexican–American War, a battalion of volunteers from New Jersey, in four companies, was active from September 1847 to July 1848. Philip Kearny, an officer who led a cavalry unit, followed General Winfield Scott and fought in the Battle of Contreras and Battle of Churubusco. After the war, Kearny made his home in the state of New Jersey.

The Quaker population was especially intolerant of slavery, and the state was a major part of the Underground Railroad. The New Jersey legislature passed an act for the gradual abolition of slavery in 1804, providing that no person born after that date would be a slave. It was not until 1830 that most blacks were free in the state. New Jersey was the last northern state to abolish slavery completely, and by the close of the Civil War, about a dozen African-Americans in New Jersey were still apprenticed freedmen. The 1860 census found just over 25,000 free African Americans in the state. Thousands of former slaves—both from rural New Jersey and the South—migrated to shore communities like Red Bank, Long Branch, and Asbury Park during the last decades of the nineteenth century, creating sizable, stable communities that persisted over the next century.

New Jersey at first refused to ratify the Constitutional Amendment banning slavery. Although no Civil War battles were fought within New Jersey, the state sent over 88,000 soldiers as part of some 31 infantry and cavalry regiments, and about 20% died in the war. 23,116 of those soldiers served in the Army of the Potomac. Soldiers from New Jersey fought generally in the War's Eastern theater. Philip Kearny, an officer from the Mexican–American War, led a brigade of New Jersey regiments under Brigadier General William B. Franklin. Kearny distinguished himself as a brilliant officer during the Peninsula Campaign, and was promoted to the position of major general.

The Republican Party was unpopular in the state and New Jersey was one of the few states to favor Stephen Douglas over Abraham Lincoln in the 1860 presidential election. The people of New Jersey also cast their electoral votes for George B. McClellan when he ran for president against Abraham Lincoln in the election of 1864. The people had the distinction of being the only free state that rejected Lincoln twice. McClellan was later elected governor, serving from 1878 to 1881.

Many industrial cities like Paterson and Camden grew strong through Civil War production. They manufactured many necessities, including clothing and war materials like ammunition. These cities prospered through heavy production even after the end of the war.

== Twentieth century ==
New Jersey remained a Democrat state during the Gilded Age, voting Republican only in the 1872 presidential election, and had the notorious reputation of being under boss control, as the powerful political machines in Essex County (Newark) and Hudson County (Jersey City) worked closely with business leaders to control state and local politics. In 1896 presidential election the state flipped Republican and would remain so for the next three presidential elections. Progressive ideas emerged in the Republican party in the New York suburbs, notably in 1906 in the short-lived "New Idea" enthusiasm led by mayor Mark M. Fagan and especially the intellectual George L. Record. The main goal was to raise taxes on railways to the levels ordinary residents paid.

=== Governor Woodrow Wilson ===
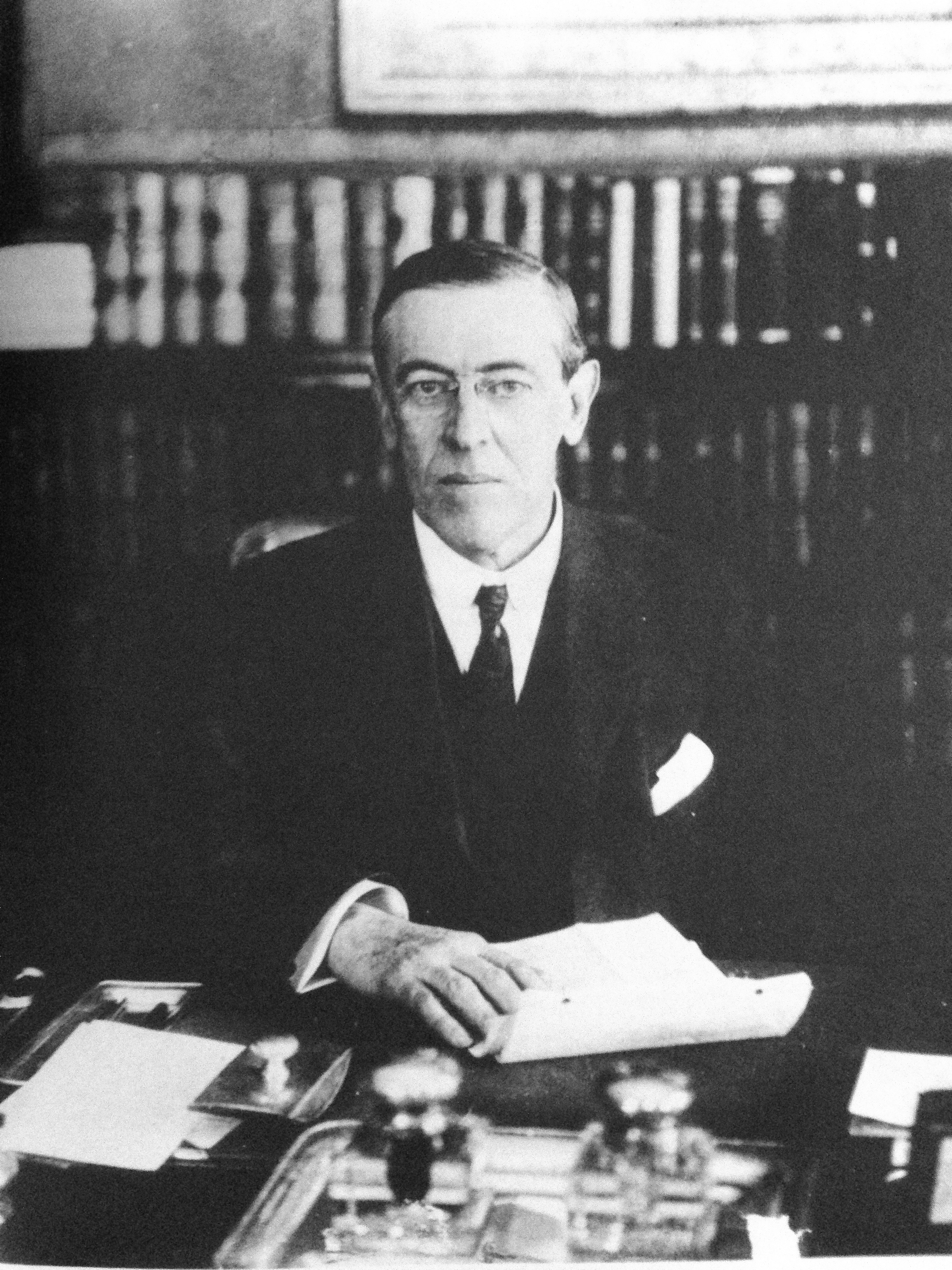
Governor Woodrow Wilson in 1911

Results of the 1910 gubernatorial election in New Jersey; Wilson won the counties in blue.

By January 1910, Wilson had drawn the attention of James Smith Jr. and George Brinton McClellan Harvey, two leaders of New Jersey's Democratic Party, as a potential candidate in the upcoming gubernatorial election. Having lost the last five gubernatorial elections, New Jersey Democratic leaders decided to throw their support behind Wilson, an untested and unconventional candidate. Party leaders believed that Wilson's academic reputation made him the ideal spokesman against trusts and corruption, but they also hoped his inexperience in governing would make him easy to influence. Wilson agreed to accept the nomination if "it came to me unsought, unanimously, and without pledges to anybody about anything."

At the state party convention, the bosses marshaled their forces and won the nomination for Wilson. He submitted his letter of resignation to Princeton on October 20. Wilson's campaign focused on the Progressive theme of letting the people rule. He quickly shed his professorial style for more emboldened speechmaking and presented himself as a full-fledged progressive. Though Republican William Howard Taft had carried New Jersey in the 1908 presidential election by more than 82,000 votes, Wilson soundly defeated Republican gubernatorial nominee Vivian M. Lewis by a margin of more than 65,000 votes. Democrats also took control of the general assembly in the 1910 elections, though the state senate remained in Republican hands.After winning the election, Wilson appointed Joseph Patrick Tumulty as his private secretary.

Working closely with George Record, the intellectual leader of Progressivism in the state, Wilson began formulating his reformist agenda. Smith asked Wilson to endorse his bid for the U.S. Senate, but Wilson refused and instead endorsed Smith's opponent James Edgar Martine, who had won the Democratic primary. Martine's victory in the Senate election helped Wilson position himself as an independent force in the New Jersey Democratic Party.

By 1910 New Jersey had gained a reputation for public corruption; the state was known as the "Mother of Trusts" because it allowed companies like Standard Oil to escape the antitrust laws of other states. Wilson and his allies quickly won passage of the Geran bill, which undercut the power of the political bosses by requiring primaries for all elective offices and party officials. A corrupt practices law and a workmen's compensation statute that Wilson supported won passage shortly thereafter. For his success in passing these laws during the first months of his gubernatorial term, Wilson won national and bipartisan recognition as a reformer and a leader of the Progressive movement.

Republicans took control of the state assembly in early 1912, and Wilson spent much of the rest of his tenure vetoing bills. Nonetheless, he won passage of laws that restricted labor by women and children and increased standards for factory working conditions. A new State Board of Education was set up "with the power to conduct inspections and enforce standards, regulate districts' borrowing authority, and require special classes for students with handicaps." Before leaving office Wilson oversaw the establishment of free dental clinics and enacted a "comprehensive and scientific" poor law. Trained nursing was standardized, while contract labor in all reformatories and prisons was abolished and an indeterminate sentence act passed. A law was introduced that compelled all railroad companies "to pay their employees twice monthly," while regulation of the working hours, health, safety, employment, and age of people employed in mercantile establishments was carried out. Shortly before leaving office, Wilson signed a series of antitrust laws known as the "Seven Sisters," as well as another law that removed the power to select juries from local sheriffs.

=== 1910s ===
The Standard Oil Company of New Jersey was a large nationwide integrated oil producing, transporting, refining, and marketing organization. Its main product at first was kerosene for lighting, and the gasoline for automobiles after 1900. In 1911, the U.S. Supreme Court ordered the dissolution of the Standard Oil Company of New Jersey, viewing it as violating the Sherman Antitrust Act. Standard Oil had controlled nearly 90% of refined oil flows into the United States, having a near complete monopoly upon it. Standard Oil Company was split into 34 smaller companies as a result of the dissolution.

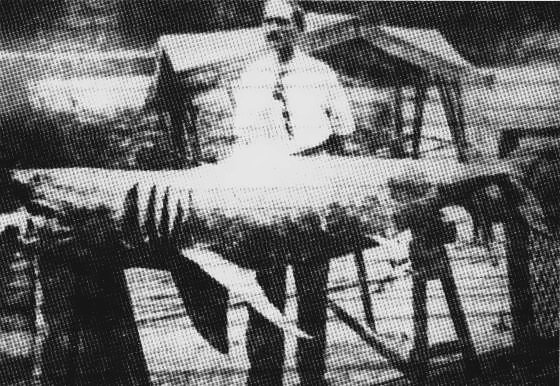
Michael Schleisser and the "Jersey man-eater" as seen in the Bronx Home News (1916)

Between July 1 and July 12, 1916, a series of shark attacks occurred along the Jersey Shore in which four swimmers were killed and another severely injured. The incidents occurred during a deadly heat wave and polio epidemic in the Northeastern United States, which drove thousands of people to the seaside resorts of the Jersey Shore. Scientists since then have debated which shark species was responsible, with the great white shark as the most cited.

==== World War I 1917-1918 ====
New Jersey was a center of shipbuilding and manufacturing during World War I. Existing factories such as the Singer Company in Elizabeth, New Jersey were converted to making weapon parts. New refineries and ammunition factories were built by companies like DuPont Engineering. After the war, many of these companies and plants shifted to chemicals, making New Jersey one of the world's leading chemical producers. Several Allied ships were sunk off the New Jersey coast.

Camp Merritt, in Cresskill, was activated for use in World War I. It was from there that many soldiers were deployed to Hoboken before shipping off to Europe. Camp Merritt was decommissioned in November 1919. Fort Dix, in Pemberton Township, New Jersey, was also constructed in 1917 to help in the war effort. It was used as a training and staging ground throughout the war. After the war, it was converted into a demobilization center.

=== Roaring Twenties ===
People standing by the border of the newly constructed Holland Tunnel in 1927

Like much of the rest of the United States, New Jersey entered a prosperous state through the 1920s. Through this period, New Jersey's population and employment rate increased greatly. Although factory production decreased after the end of World War I, production lines still churned out goods. Like all of the country outside the South, New Jersey was Republican-dominated in this era.

Transportation became much easier through the 1920s. Cars became easily affordable and roads were paved and improved such that they incorporated new road features, including jughandle turns. As a result, people who had never been farther than the outskirts of their hometown now could travel around the state. The Jersey Shore became extremely popular as an attraction. Many bridges and tunnels were built for the ease of interstate traveling. The Benjamin Franklin Bridge was completed linking Camden and Philadelphia in 1926. The Holland Tunnel, under the Hudson River, was completed in 1927, providing a means of easy transportation between New Jersey and New York City. Before, ferries were required to travel across the Hudson River. Later on, the George Washington Bridge (1931) and the Lincoln Tunnel (1937) were completed, making access to Manhattan even easier. All of the tunnels and bridges linking New York and New Jersey are managed by the Port Authority of New York and New Jersey, established on April 30, 1921.

New Jersey was the first state to ratify Prohibition, which restricted the purchasing and selling of alcohol. However, the Eighteenth Amendment to the United States Constitution, which banned alcohol manufacturing & sales, was later repealed by the Twenty-first Amendment in December 1933. Newark's breweries reopened almost immediately.

=== Great Depression era ===
Like the rest of the United States, the people of New Jersey were hit hard by the Great Depression. By 1933, one-tenth of the population was dependent upon Franklin D. Roosevelt's New Deal. In fact, New Jersey issued begging licenses to the poor people because the New Jersey government funds were being exhausted. Under the Works Progress Administration, part of the Second New Deal by FDR, many new jobs were provided in order to support the poor, including the expansion of Fort Dix, Roosevelt Park in Edison, and Rutgers Stadium in Piscataway. Strikes also grew common during the Great Depression; in 1937 a group of gravediggers from New Jersey went on strike.

In 1938, Orson Welles produced The War of the Worlds radio broadcast. Listeners were told that a "huge, flaming object ... fell on a farm in the neighborhood of Grover's Mill ... twenty-two miles from Trenton." It described extraterrestrial monsters that were causing much destruction. Although it was announced in advance that it was a radio play, the broadcast resulted in widespread panic into New Jersey and the surrounding areas. Many people had believed the bulletin to be real, causing them to flee the New Jersey area or to blockade their homes to ensure safety from the reported monsters. CBS was criticized for allowing fictitious bulletins to gain attention of listeners. Welles and the other broadcasters were not punished by law, but were held under a brief informal "house arrest" for a short period.

During the Great Depression, 20-month-old Charles Augustus Lindbergh Jr., son of famous aviator Charles Lindbergh, was abducted from his home near Hopewell, New Jersey in the Lindbergh kidnapping. The police sealed off many roads to prevent the kidnapper's escape, and interrogated the members of the Lindbergh household. Federal expert Arthur Koehler carefully examined the ladder used by the kidnapper, which he traced to a company in McCormick, South Carolina. James J. Finn was a lieutenant who attempted to capture the kidnapper while he was passing off ransom bills. Finally, a ransom note was located and traced to Bruno Hauptmann; the bill had the license plate number of Hauptmann's Dodge Saloon that was written down by a gas attendant. He was tried in Flemington, New Jersey in what was known as the "Trial of the Century", and was convicted. He was electrocuted in the New Jersey State Prison in Trenton, New Jersey. The Lindbergh kidnapping led to passage of the Federal Kidnapping Act, also known as the "Lindbergh Law", which made kidnapping a federal crime.

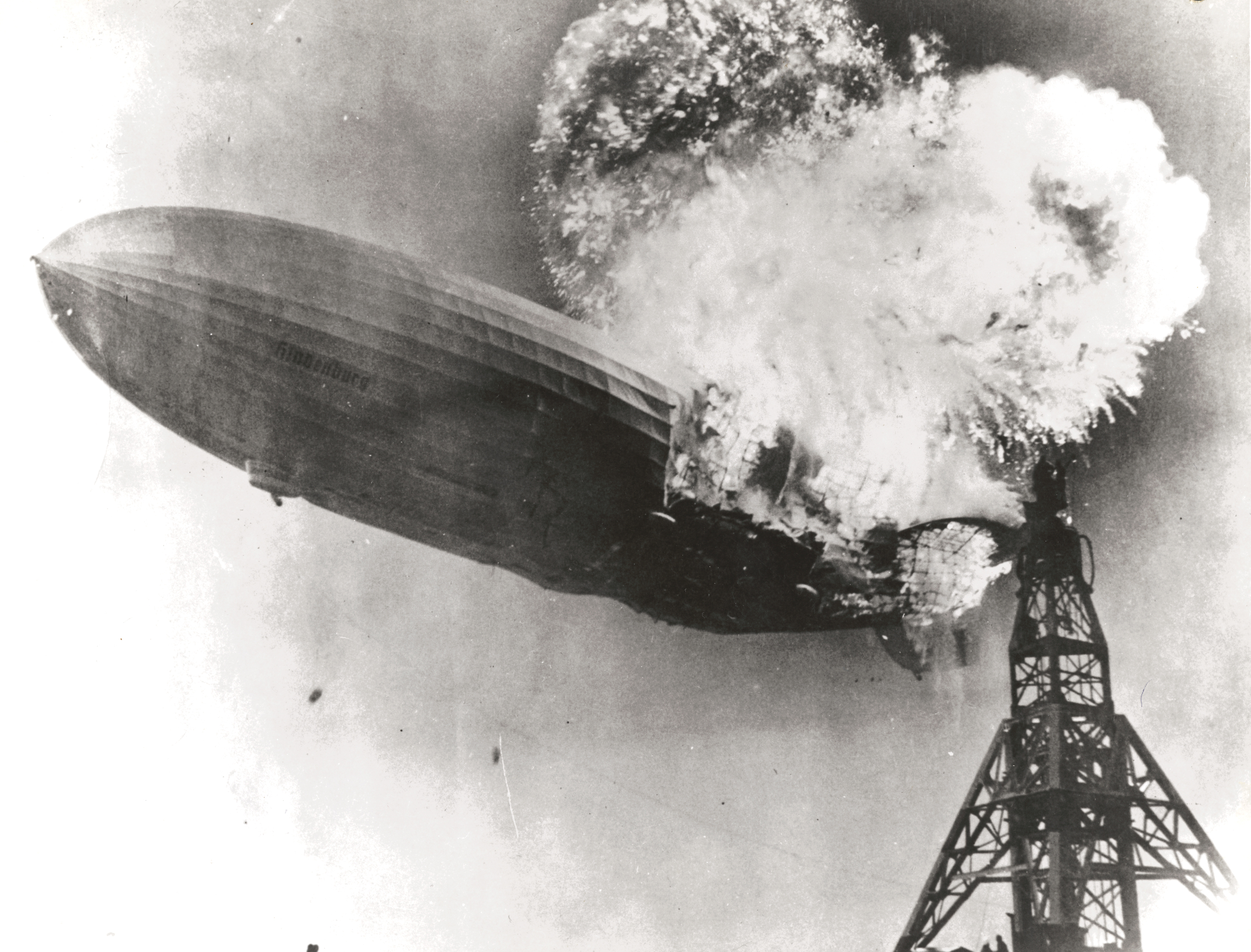
The Hindenburg just moments after catching fire in 1937

In 1937, the German zeppelin Hindenburg exploded over Lakehurst Naval Air Station in Manchester. While approaching a mooring mast at Lakehurst, the zeppelin suddenly caught fire, and within 34 seconds the entire hydrogen-filled zeppelin was engulfed in flames; 36 people died in the disaster, most of them leaping from the burning ship. Contrary to popular belief, the Hindenburg had flown an entire year of successful voyages before it caught on fire. Questions and controversy surround the accident to this day: theories for the sudden burst of flames include sabotage against the German Nazis, static build-up, and flammable fabric.

=== World War II And the 1940s ===
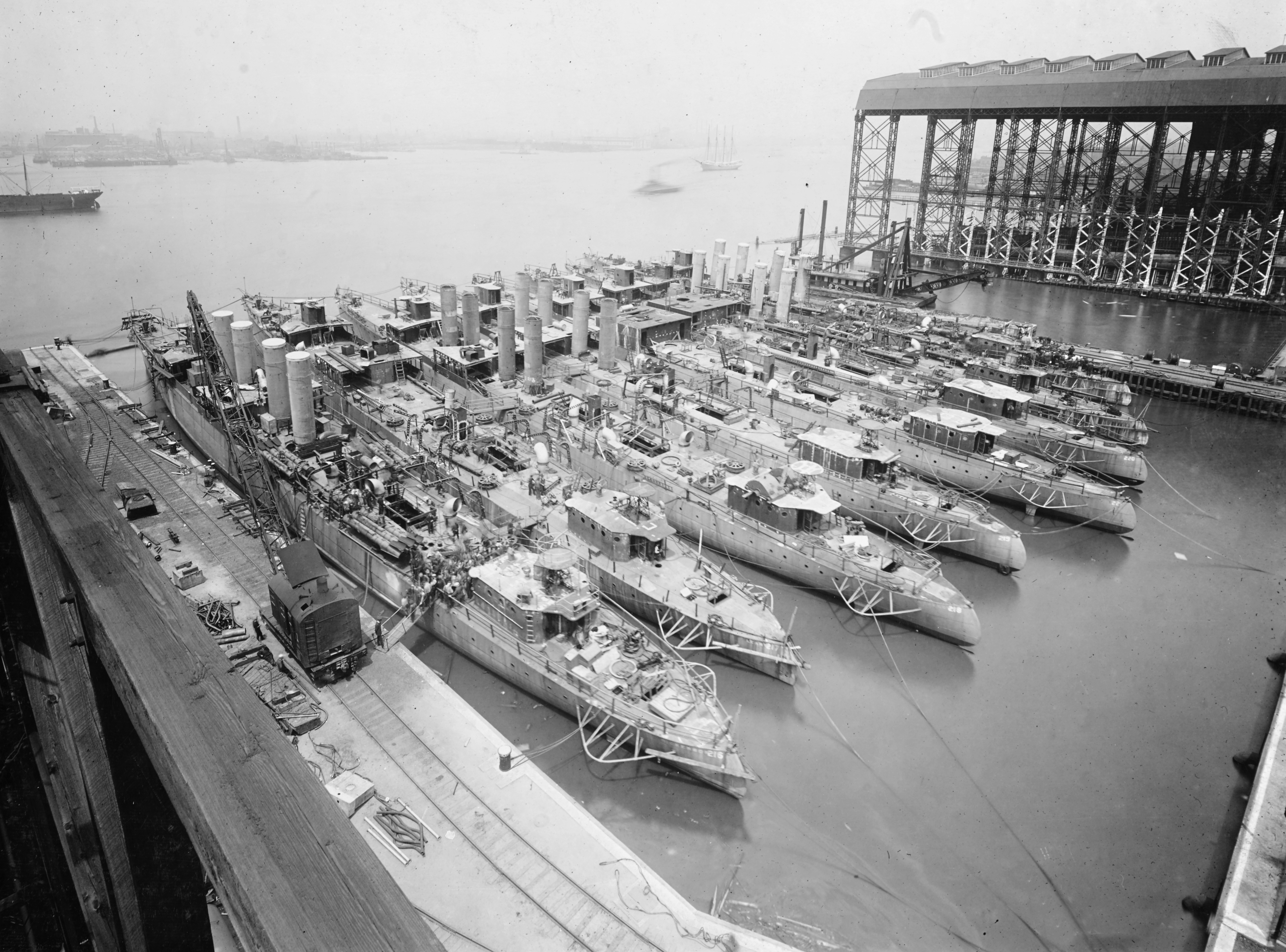
A fleet of naval forces being constructed in the Camden shipyards in 1919

New Jersey shipyards were responsible for the construction of many naval ships in World War II, including battleships, aircraft carriers, heavy cruisers and destroyers, receiving 9% of all allied war-related contracts through the war. Nearly 500,000 residents enlisted for the war, more than 10% of the total population of New Jersey. Many women took jobs in factories during their husbands' absences.

Camp Kilmer was a staging area near New Brunswick that served the port of New York. Its buildings were painted with protective camouflage patterns. Camp Kilmer helped to serve troops by offering medical care and providing supplies. Camp Kilmer was later reactivated for the Korean War and the 1956 Hungarian Revolution. Fort Dix was reopened for the training of soldiers for the war effort. During the war, Naval Weapons Station Earle in Monmouth County was opened for naval production and provided ships with a safe port to take on ammunition.

Millville Airport opened on August 2, 1941. It was called "America's First Defense Airport" because it was opened as a gunnery training area for fighter pilots. Over 1,500 pilots were trained for advanced aircraft fighting at this airport. Fort Hancock was also opened in Sandy Hook. Gunners in the fort prevented German submarines from entering New York Harbor. The airfield, currently known as McGuire Air Force Base, was opened in 1937 as Rudd Field, a supporting Army airfield for Fort Dix. It was expanded during wartime operations and turned over to the Air Force in 1949.

One of the most dramatic war events in the Northeast occurred in 1945, when US forces hit and sank a German U-boat (U-869) off the coast of New Jersey. The Coast Guard station at what is now Sandy Hook Gateway Park was manned for the duration of the war to protect New York harbor.

An internment camp housing people of Japanese, German, and Italian descent was located in Gloucester City. In addition, Seabrook Farms took advantage of Japanese-American labor to increase productivity when the government allowed small groups of people from the internment camps to work there. At the end of World War II, the government closed down the internment camps, but many people from the camps continued to work at Seabrook Farms.

In 1947, the current New Jersey State Constitution was ratified, reorganizing the state government. Governors were allowed to serve four years instead of three, and the Legislature was constituted with a 40-member Senate and an 80-member General Assembly. The new State Constitution also returned the right of suffrage to females and non-whites.

=== African American Suffrage ===
African Americans and women in New Jersey lost the right to vote due to the passage of the 1807 Disenfranchisement Statute. African Americans organized in various ways throughout the state to reinstate the right to vote. Residents of Newark and Boonton submitted petitions to reinstate voting rights for African American men who met the income requirements stipulated for white men. Black abolitionist, activist, and educator Charles H. Thompson and two other Black activists were at the center of an 1860 campaign in Newark to challenge the unconstitutionality of the state's voting law. Thompson and Abraham Conover were the test plaintiffs and unsuccessfully sued for damages for being refused the right to vote.

The 15th Amendment to the United States Constitution granted the right to vote to all US citizens regardless of race, color, or previous condition of servitude. It was passed on February 26, 1869, ratified on February 3, 1870, and adopted by President Ulysses S. Grant on March 30, 1870. The very next day, Perth Amboy resident Thomas Mundy Peterson cast his historic vote, making him the first African American to vote following the adoption of the 15th Amendment. In recognition of his enduring legacy, the New Jersey legislature designated March 31 as Thomas Mundy Peterson Day in 1998.

Following the turn of the century, Black women who had been working alongside white suffragists and disenfranchised Black men found themselves in a precarious position. Florence Spearing Randolph was an American clubwoman, suffragist, and ordained minister, pastor of the Wallace Chapel AME Zion Church in Summit, New Jersey from 1925 to 1946. In 1915 she was founder and president of the New Jersey Federation of Colored Women's Clubs to coordinate the work of various African American women’s clubs around the state. Generally barred from membership in the white women’s clubs of New Jersey, Black women joined forces in their own organization to improve social, educational, and working conditions in their communities. Violet A. Johnson was a civic leader, community organizer, and suffragist. By joining the all-white New Jersey Women's Suffrage Association, her leadership helped transform New Jersey's women's suffrage movement into a multi-racial movement. She was especially dedicated to uplifting the lives of local and migrant Black women.

Ultimately, the Voting Rights Act of 1965 outlawed discriminatory voting practices, including literacy, history, and other tests as a prerequisite for voting.

=== Late 20th century ===
In the 1950s, the Port Authority of New York and New Jersey planned and built the Port Newark-Elizabeth Marine Terminal in the cities of Newark and Elizabeth. This was the first port in the world to containerize due to the innovation of Malcolm McLean and the founding of the Sea-Land Corporation. The newly opened port quickly made the docks of Brooklyn, Lower Manhattan and Hoboken obsolete. In 1985, the port was the busiest in the world. (See Port Newark-Elizabeth Marine Terminal).

During the 1960s, many African Americans felt disenfranchised, feelings exacerbated by poor urban conditions, declining industrial jobs, and biased police forces with little minority representation. This tension led to race riots, the first of which occurred in Jersey City on August 2, 1964, causing heavy damage. Seventy-one stores were damaged and 46 people were injured. From August 11 to August 13, 1964, similar riots occurred in Paterson and Elizabeth. In the Paterson riot, twenty stores and other buildings were damaged, and eight people were injured. In the Elizabeth riot, six people were injured and seventeen stores were damaged. In the aftermath of these riots, 135 people were arrested.

In the summer of 1967, protests began after the alleged murder of John William Smith by two Newark cops. The protests and ensuing riots consisted mainly of the African American communities of Newark and Plainfield. While Smith was not murdered, the riots were a response to decades of racial tensions between majority-white government officials and African-American communities. Twenty-four people died in the riots, and nearly 1,600 were arrested. The riots are often cited as a major factor in the decline of Newark and its neighboring communities. Residents who could leave, fled to the suburbs following the riots.

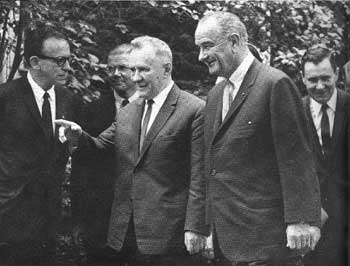
Former U.S. president Lyndon Johnson meeting Alexei Kosygin in Glassboro in 1967

In the middle of the Cold War from June 23 to June 25, 1967, U.S. president Lyndon Johnson met with Soviet premier Alexei Kosygin in Glassboro, New Jersey, for the Glassboro Summit Conference. at the Glassboro State College. No specific agreements were reached, especially in the area of restrictions on anti-ballistic missile systems. However, the meeting helped improve the strained relationships between the Soviet Union and the US.

Because of its strategic location on the East Coast, New Jersey played an important role in the United States's Cold War defense. Fourteen Nike anti-aircraft missile batteries in two groups were constructed in New Jersey to protect the metropolitan areas around Philadelphia and New York City. In addition, a regional command center was built in New Jersey. By 1974, the missile sites were deactivated. In addition to these, air defense radar sites, bases for interceptor aircraft, anti-aircraft gun batteries, surface-to-air missile sites, and command and control facilities were constructed to defend against an attack by long range, nuclear-armed aircraft of the Soviet Air Force.

In 1973, the New Jersey Supreme Court ordered the legislature to pass a statute funding schools more equitably for impoverished areas. The legislature did this in 1975 but failed to fund it. The Court thereupon shut down all public schools for eight days in 1976, until the legislature passed an income tax bill. Prior to this bill, the state had no income tax.

In 1998, the south side of Ellis Island came under the jurisdiction of New Jersey following a US Supreme Court decision, New Jersey v. New York. Before, the island had been governed by the state of New York. However, after the court decision, disagreements between New Jersey and New York led to the sharing of jurisdiction over the island by the two states.

== Twenty-first century ==
=== Terrorist attacks ===
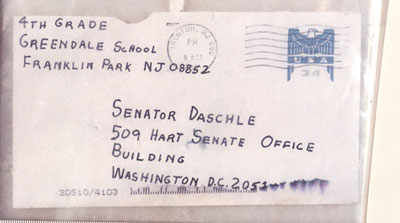
A letter sent to Senate Majority Leader Tom Daschle containing anthrax powder, which caused the deaths of two postal workers.

In the September 11, 2001, attacks, hijackers took control of four domestic U.S. commercial airliners, including United Airlines Flight 93 which departed from Newark International Airport. The attacks caused 2,986 deaths, including about 700 residents of New Jersey. Over 160,000 people were evacuated by ferries and small boats from the Manhattan area to New Jersey because the NYCS and PATH stations were closed down.

The destruction of Lower Manhattan office space accelerated the pre-2001 trend of moving jobs from Lower Manhattan to Midtown and New Jersey. The Goldman Sachs Tower was constructed in Jersey City as part of this relocation.

For several weeks beginning on September 18, 2001, letters bearing a Trenton, New Jersey postmark and containing anthrax bacteria were mailed to several news media offices and two US Senators. The letters were ultimately determined to have been mailed there by a Maryland-based scientist.

=== 2004–05 gubernatorial vacancy and subsequent events ===
Former Governor James E. McGreevey resigned on November 15, 2004, after charges of pay-to-play and extortion scandals involving the impropriety of the appointment of an unqualified long-rumored homosexual love interest. New Jersey had no Lieutenant Governor position at the time, leaving a vacancy in the office. Senate President Richard Codey served as Acting Governor (then Governor) in McGreevey's place. Jon Corzine was elected Governor of New Jersey on November 8, 2005, and took office on January 17, 2006. On Election Day, November 8, 2005, the voters passed an amendment to the state constitution creating the position of Lieutenant Governor, effective with the 2009 elections. This position was first filled by the election of Kim Guadagno who assumed office in 2009.

== See also ==
- History of the mid-Atlantic states
- List of historical societies in New Jersey
- New Jersey
- Politics of New Jersey
- Timeline of women's suffrage in New Jersey
- Women's suffrage in New Jersey
- Judicial:
  - New Jersey Supreme Court
- Legislative:
  - New Jersey Senate
  - New Jersey General Assembly
  - New Jersey Provincial Congress
- Executive:
  - Governor of New Jersey
  - List of colonial governors of New Jersey (1624–1776)
  - List of governors of New Jersey (1776–present)
- Cities:
  - Timeline of Newark, New Jersey
  - Timeline of Jersey City, New Jersey
