= Index of New Jersey–related articles =

The location of the state of New Jersey in the United States of America

The following is an alphabetical list of articles related to the U.S. state of New Jersey.

== 0–9 ==
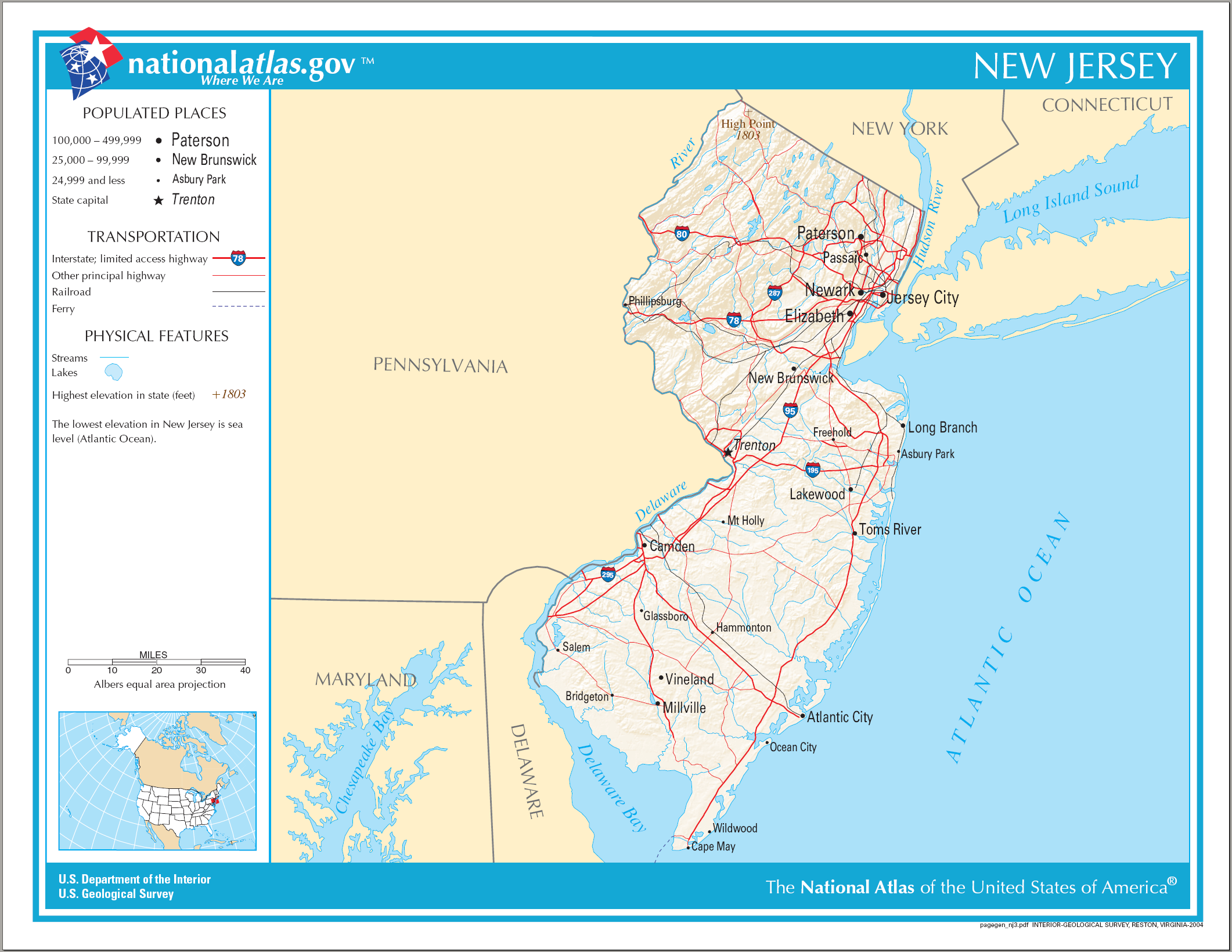
An enlargeable map of the state of New Jersey

- .nj.us – Internet second-level domain for the state of New Jersey
- 3rd State to ratify the Constitution of the United States
- 500-series county routes in New Jersey
- 2006 New Jersey state government shutdown

== A ==
- Abramoff, Jack
- Action Park
- Adjacent states:
  - Commonwealth of Pennsylvania
  - State of Delaware
  - State of New York
- Agriculture in New Jersey
- Airports in New Jersey
- American Conference on Diversity
- American Revolutionary War
- Amusement parks in New Jersey
- Andros, Edmund
- Appalachian Mountains
- Appalachian Trail
- Aquaria in New Jersey
  - commons:Category:Aquaria in New Jersey
- Arboreta in New Jersey
  - commons:Category:Arboreta in New Jersey
- Archaeology of New Jersey
  - Category:Archaeological sites in New Jersey
    - commons:Category:Archaeological sites in New Jersey
- Architecture of New Jersey
- Area codes in New Jersey
- Art museums and galleries in New Jersey
  - commons:Category:Art museums and galleries in New Jersey
- Arthur Kill
- Asbury Park
- Association of New Jersey Chiropractors
- Astronomical observatories in New Jersey
  - commons:Category:Astronomical observatories in New Jersey
- Atlantic City, New Jersey
- Atlantic City
- Atlantic City Expressway
- Atlantic Ocean

== B ==
- Baby It's You
- Bamberger, Louis
- Barclay, Robert
- Barnegat Bay
- Barton, Clara
- Basie, William "Count"
- Bass River
- Battle of Monmouth
- Battle of Princeton
- Battle of Trenton
- Bayonne
- Bayonne Bridge
- Beaches of New Jersey
  - commons:Category:Beaches of New Jersey
- A Beautiful Mind
- Bell Labs
- Benny (Jersey Shore insult)
- Berkeley College
- Bernard, Francis
- Bloomfield College
- Bon Jovi
- Bon Jovi, Jon
- Border between West Jersey and East Jersey
- Boroughitis
- Botanical gardens in New Jersey
  - commons:Category:Botanical gardens in New Jersey
- Boyden, Seth
- Bradley, Bill
- Breschi, Gaetano
- Branch Brook Park
- Buildings and structures in New Jersey
  - commons:Category:Buildings and structures in New Jersey
- Burlington, capital of the Colony of West Jersey 1673–1688, capital of the Province of West Jersey 1689–1702, co-capital of the Province of New-Jersey 1702–1776, co-capital of the State of New Jersey 1776-1784
- Burnet, William
- Burr, Aaron
- Burr, Aaron
- Byrne, Brendan

== C ==
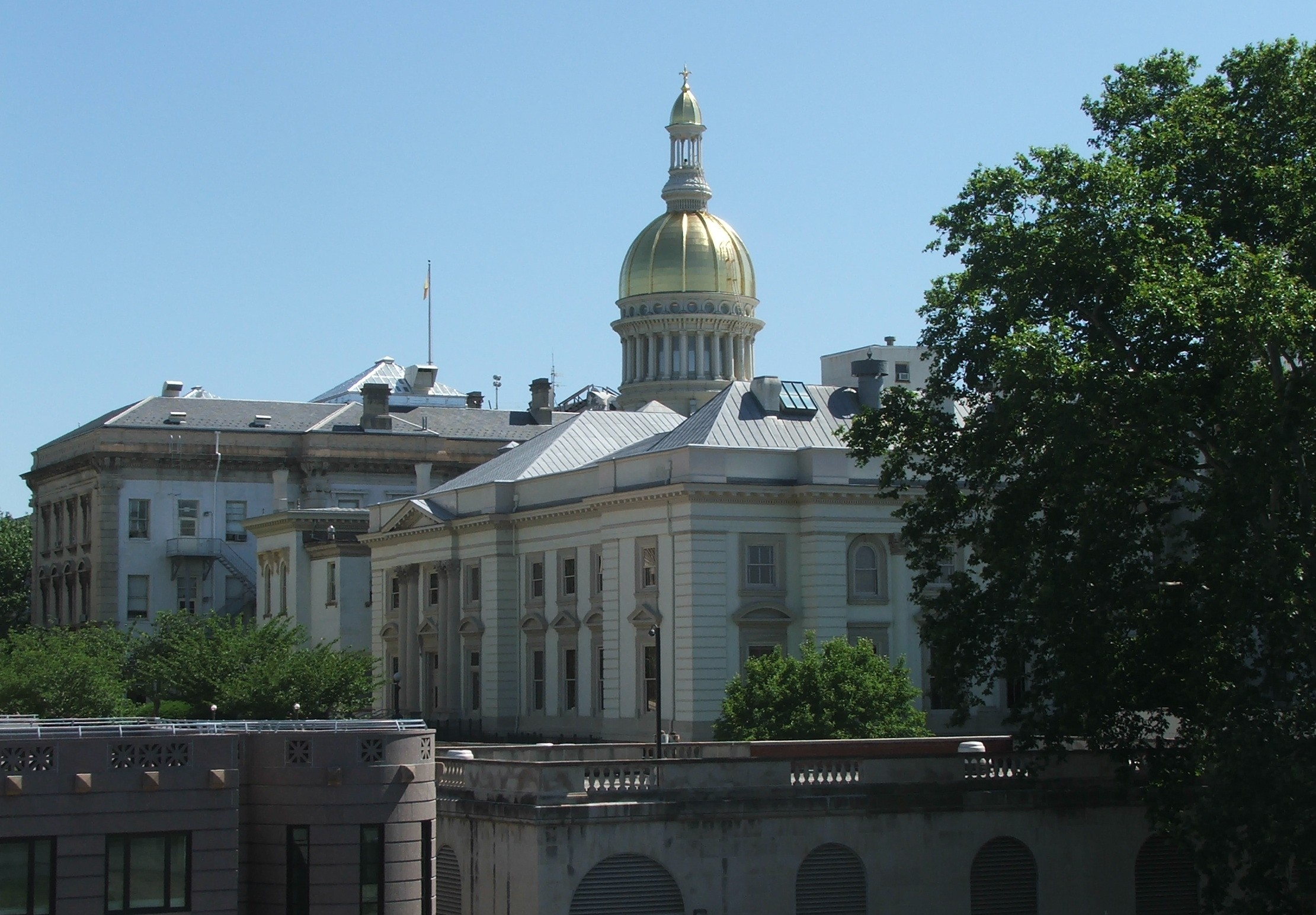
The New Jersey State House in Trenton

An enlargeable map of the 21 counties of the State of New Jersey

- Cahill, William T.
- Calder, Alexander
- Caldwell College
- Camden
- Camden Central Airport
- Camden Riversharks
- Cape May (promontory)
- Cape May (town)
- Cape May-Lewes Ferry
- Capital of the State of New Jersey
- Capitol of the State of New Jersey
  - commons:Category:New Jersey State Capitol
- Emilio Carranza
- George Carteret
- Casinos in New Jersey
- Castle Point
- Castle Point Park
- Cathedral of the Sacred Heart
- Census statistical areas in New Jersey
- Centenary College
- Central Jersey
- Church Square Park
- Cities in New Jersey
- Clam Broth House
- Cleveland, Grover
- Climate of New Jersey
- Climate change in New Jersey
- Clinton Road
- CNBC
- Codey, Richard
- Cohansey River
- The College of New Jersey
- College of Saint Elizabeth
- Colleges and universities in New Jersey
- Columbus Park
- Communications in New Jersey
  - commons:Category:Communications in New Jersey
- Conrail
- Cooke, Martin
- Cooper, James Fenimore
- Corzine, Jon
- Counties of the State of New Jersey
- Crane, Stephen
- Crossings of the Raritan River
- Cuisine of New Jersey
- Culture of New Jersey
  - commons:Category:New Jersey culture
- Cunningham, Glenn

== D ==
- Delaware Bay
- Delaware River
- Delaware River and Bay Authority
- Delaware River Port Authority
- Delaware & Raritan Canal
- Delaware Water Gap
- Demographics of New Jersey
- Deptford
- Deptford Mall
- The Devil's Tree
- Drew University
- Driscoll, Alfred E.
- Driscoll Bridge
- Dutch West India Company

== E ==
- East Jersey
- East Orange
- Economy of New Jersey
  - Category:Economy of New Jersey
    - commons:Category:Economy of New Jersey
- Edge, Walter E.
- Edison
- Edison Records
- Edison, Charles
- Edison, Thomas
- Education in New Jersey
  - Category:Education in New Jersey
    - commons:Category:Education in New Jersey
- Einstein, Albert
- Elections in New Jersey
  - Category:Elections in New Jersey
    - commons:Category:Elections in New Jersey
- Elizabethtown, now Elizabeth, New Jersey, colonial capital 1665–1673
- Ellis Island
- Category:Environment of New Jersey
  - commons:Category:Environment of New Jersey

== F ==
The Flag of the State of New Jersey

- Fairleigh Dickinson University
- Felician College
- Fenwick, Millicent
- Festivals in New Jersey
  - commons:Category:Festivals in New Jersey
- Finns Point
- Flag of the State of New Jersey
- Florio, James
- Anne Flournoy
- Forbes, Malcolm
- Forts in New Jersey
  - Fort Dix
  - Fort Lee
  - Category:Forts in New Jersey
    - commons:Category:Forts in New Jersey
- Foster, Stephen
- Frank Sinatra Park
- Franklin, William

== G ==
The Great Seal of the State of New Jersey

- Garden State
- Garden State Parkway
- Gary Brolsma
- Gateway National Recreation Area
- Gateway Park
- Geography of New Jersey
  - Category:Geography of New Jersey
    - commons:Category:Geography of New Jersey
- Geology of New Jersey
  - Category:Geology of New Jersey
    - commons:Category:Geology of New Jersey
- George Washington Bridge
- Georgian Court College
- Ghost towns in New Jersey
  - Category:Ghost towns in New Jersey
    - commons:Category:Ghost towns in New Jersey
- Giants Stadium
- Ginsberg, Allen
- Glacial Lake Passaic
- Goethals Bridge
- Goldman Sachs Tower
- Golf clubs and courses in New Jersey
- Government of the State of New Jersey website
  - Category:Government of New Jersey
    - commons:Category:Government of New Jersey
- Governor of the State of New Jersey
  - List of governors of New Jersey
- Great Egg Harbor River
- Great Falls of the Passaic River
- Great Seal of the State of New Jersey
- Greetings from Asbury Park, N.J.
- Gun laws in New Jersey
- Gunn, Sakia

== H ==
- Hackensack River
  - Hackensack River Canoe & Kayak Club
- Haddonfield
- Haddon Heights
- Hague, Frank
- Haines, Daniel
- Hambletonian
- Hamilton, Alexander
- Hamilton, Andrew
- Hart, John
- Hauptmann, Bruno
- Healy, Jerramiah
- High Point
- High schools in New Jersey
- Highway routes in New Jersey
- Hiking trails in New Jersey
  - commons:Category:Hiking trails in New Jersey
- Hindenburg disaster
- History of New Jersey
  - Historical outline of New Jersey
- Hoboken
- Hoboken election of 2005
- Hoboken Island
- Hoboken Parks Initiative
- Hoboken Tea Building Walkway
- Hoffman, Harold G.
- Holland Tunnel
- Hopkinson, Francis
- Holmdel Horn Antenna
- Hospitals in New Jersey
- Hot springs of New Jersey
  - commons:Category:Hot springs of New Jersey
- Hudson, Henry
- Hudson-Bergen Light Rail
- Hudson County
- Hudson River
- Hughes, Richard J.

== I ==
- Images of New Jersey
  - commons:Category:New Jersey
- Institute for Advanced Study
- Interstate 78
- Interstate 80
- Interstate 95
- Interstate 278
- Interstate 280
- Interstate 287
- Ironbound
- Italian-Americans
- Izod Center (known as the Continental Airlines Arena until October 2007)

== J ==
- Jackson Street Park
- Jackson Whites
- James, Duke of York
- Jersey Boys
- Jersey City
- Jersey Devil
- Jersey Dutch
- Jersey Shore
- John, Lord Berkeley
- Johns, Michael
- Jungle Habitat

== K ==
- Kean, Thomas
- Kean, Thomas Jr.
- Kean Jersey City
- Kean University
- Keith, Brian
- Kingda Ka
- Kingsland explosion

== L ==
- Lackawanna Cut-Off
- Lakes of New Jersey
  - Lake Hopatcong
  - commons:Category:Lakes of New Jersey
- Landmarks in New Jersey
  - commons:Category:Landmarks in New Jersey
- Latifah, Queen
- Lautenberg, Frank R.
- Law enforcement agencies in New Jersey
- Lenape
- Lenapehoking
- Liberty Science Center
- Liberty State Park
- Lincoln Highway
- Lincoln Tunnel
- Lindbergh, Charles
- Lindbergh kidnapping
- Lists related to the State of New Jersey:
  - List of airports in New Jersey
  - List of bridges documented by the Historic American Engineering Record in New Jersey
  - List of bridges on the National Register of Historic Places in New Jersey
  - List of census statistical areas in New Jersey
  - List of cities in New Jersey
  - List of colleges and universities in New Jersey
  - List of counties in New Jersey
  - List of crossings of the Raritan River
  - List of 500-series county routes in New Jersey
  - List of dams and reservoirs in New Jersey
  - List of forts in New Jersey
  - List of ghost towns in New Jersey
  - List of governors of New Jersey
  - List of high schools in New Jersey
  - List of highway routes in New Jersey
  - List of hospitals in New Jersey
  - List of individuals executed in New Jersey
  - List of lakes of New Jersey
  - List of law enforcement agencies in New Jersey
  - List of mayors of Hoboken, New Jersey
  - List of movies set in New Jersey
  - List of municipalities in New Jersey (by population)
  - List of museums in New Jersey
  - List of National Historic Landmarks in New Jersey
  - List of newspapers in New Jersey
  - List of people from Jersey City, New Jersey
  - List of people from New Jersey
  - List of power stations in New Jersey
  - List of radio stations in New Jersey
  - List of railroads in New Jersey
  - List of Registered Historic Places in New Jersey
  - List of rivers of New Jersey
  - List of school districts in New Jersey
  - List of state forests in New Jersey
  - List of state parks in New Jersey
  - List of state prisons in New Jersey
  - List of symbols of the State of New Jersey
  - List of telephone area codes in New Jersey
  - List of television stations in New Jersey
  - List of New Jersey's congressional delegations
  - List of United States congressional districts in New Jersey
  - List of United States representatives from New Jersey
  - List of United States senators from New Jersey
- Livingston, William
- Lombardi, Vince
- Lower New York Bay
- Lucent Technologies
- Lucy the Elephant

== M ==
- Madison Park
- Maps of New Jersey
  - commons:Category:Maps of New Jersey
- Marine Academy of Science and Technology
- Marineview Plaza
- Maurice River
- Mayors of Hoboken, New Jersey
- McClellan, George Brinton
- McGreevey, James
- Meadowlands Racetrack
- Meadowlands Sports Complex
- Menlo Park
- MetLife Stadium
- MetroStars
- Meyner, Robert B.
- Miss America
- Monmouth University
- Monopoly (game)
- Montclair State University
- Monuments and memorials in New Jersey
  - commons:Category:Monuments and memorials in New Jersey
- Moore, A. Harry
- Morris Canal
- Morris, Lewis
- Morristown
- Mountains of New Jersey
  - commons:Category:Mountains of New Jersey
- Movies set in New Jersey
- Mullica River
- Municipalities in New Jersey by population
- Musconetcong River
- Museums in New Jersey
  - Category:Museums in New Jersey
    - commons:Category:Museums in New Jersey
- Music of New Jersey
  - Category:Music of New Jersey
    - commons:Category:Music of New Jersey
  - Category:Musical groups from New Jersey
  - Category:Musicians from New Jersey
- My Chemical Romance

== N ==
- Namesake of the State of New Jersey - Bailiwick of Jersey, Channel Islands, United Kingdom
- Nash, John Forbes
- Nast, Thomas
- National Historic Landmarks in New Jersey
- Natural history of New Jersey
  - commons:Category:Natural history of New Jersey
- Nature centers in New Jersey
  - commons:Category:Nature centers in New Jersey
- Navesink River
- Newark, New Jersey
- Newark Bay
- Newark Bay Bridge
- Newark Bears
- Newark City Subway
- Newark Liberty International Airport
- New Brunswick
- New Jersey website
  - Category:New Jersey
    - commons:Category:New Jersey
      - commons:Category:Maps of New Jersey
- New Jersey Athletic Conference
- New Jersey Association for Infant Mental Health
- New Jersey Cardinals
- New Jersey census statistical areas
- New Jersey Detective Agency
- New Jersey Devils
- New Jersey English
- New Jersey films
- New Jersey Folklore Society
- New Jersey Generals
- New Jersey Gladiators SC
- New Jersey Hall of Fame
- New Jersey Institute of Technology
- New Jersey Legislature
- New Jersey Lightning
- New Jersey locations by per capita income
- New Jersey Meadowlands
- New Jersey Music Hall of Fame
- New Jersey Nets
- New Jersey Palisades
- New Jersey Sports and Exposition Authority
- New Jersey State Capitol
- New Jersey State House
- New Jersey State Police
- New Jersey Surcharge
- New Jersey: The Movie
- New Jersey Transit
- New Jersey Turnpike
- New Jersey Youth Theatre
- New Netherland
- New York-Newark-Bridgeport, NY-NJ-CT-PA Combined Statistical Area
- New York-Northern New Jersey-Long Island, NY-NJ-PA Metropolitan Statistical Area
- Newport Tower
- Newport Centre Mall
- Newspapers in New Jersey
- New Sweden
- New York Giants
- New York Harbor
- New York Jets
- Nicholson, Jack
- Nitro (Six Flags Great Adventure)
- NJ – United States Postal Service postal code for the State of New Jersey
- North Jersey

== O ==
- Ocean City
- Ocean Grove
- Outdoor sculptures in New Jersey
  - commons:Category:Outdoor sculptures in New Jersey
- Outerbridge Crossing
- Overpeck Creek

== P ==
- Palace Amusements
- Passaic
- Passaic River
- Paterson
- Paterson, William
- PATH
- Penn, William
- Penzias, Arno
- People from Jersey City, New Jersey
- People from New Jersey
  - Category:People from New Jersey
    - commons:Category:People from New Jersey
    - Category:People from New Jersey by populated place
    - Category:People from New Jersey by occupation
- Pequannock River
- Perth Amboy, capital of the Colony of East Jersey 1673–1688, capital of the Province of East Jersey 1689–1702, co-capital of the Province of New-Jersey 1702–1776, co-capital of the State of New Jersey 1776-1784
- Philadelphia metropolitan area
- Pier A
- Pine Barrens
- The Pingry School
- Pitcher, Molly
- Pohatcong Creek
- Pohatcong Mountain
- Politics of New Jersey
  - Category:Politics of New Jersey
    - commons:Category:Politics of New Jersey
- Pompton River
- Port Authority of New York and New Jersey
- PATCO
- Port Newark-Elizabeth Marine Terminal
- Port Reading
- Pride Connections Center
- Princeton, New Jersey
- Princeton University
- Protected areas of New Jersey
  - commons:Category:Protected areas of New Jersey
- Province of New Jersey
- PSE&G
- Pulaski Skyway

== Q ==
- Quakers

== R ==
- Radio stations in New Jersey
- Railroads in New Jersey
- Ramapo River
- Ramapo Mountains
- Ramapo Mountain Indians
- Raritan (tribe)
- Raritan Bay
- Raritan River
- Red Bank
- Registered Historic Places in New Jersey
- Reines, Frederick
- Religion in New Jersey
  - Category:Religion in New Jersey
    - commons:Category:Religion in New Jersey
- Stockton University
- Rider University
- Rockaway River
- Rivers in New Jersey
- Roberts, David
- Roebling, John A.
- Roller coasters in New Jersey
  - commons:Category:Roller coasters in New Jersey
- Roth, Philip
- Rowan University
- Russo, Anthony
- Rutgers University

== S ==
- Safe Corridor
- Saint Peter's University
- Salem River
- Sandy Hook
- Sandy Hook Bay
- Savoy Records
- School districts in New Jersey
- Schultz, Dutch
- Scouting in New Jersey
- Seal of New Jersey
- Seton Hall University
- Settlements in New Jersey
  - Cities in New Jersey
  - Towns in New Jersey
  - Villages in New Jersey
  - Townships in New Jersey
  - Census Designated Places in New Jersey
  - Other unincorporated communities in New Jersey
  - List of ghost towns in New Jersey
- Seven Mile Island
- Shades Of Death Road
- Shrewsbury River
- Sinatra, Frank
- Six Flags Great Adventure
- Ski areas and resorts in New Jersey
  - commons:Category:Ski areas and resorts in New Jersey
- Smith, Kevin
- Smith, Patti
- Society for the Establishment of Useful Manufactures
- Solar power in New Jersey
- The Sopranos
- South Orange
- South Jersey
- South Mountain Reservation
- Sports in New Jersey
  - commons:Category:Sports in New Jersey
- Sports venues in New Jersey
  - commons:Category:Sports venues in New Jersey
- Springsteen, Bruce
- State forests in New Jersey
- State of New Jersey website
  - Government of the State of New Jersey
    - Category:Government of New Jersey
      - commons:Category:Government of New Jersey
- State parks in New Jersey
- State Police of New Jersey
- State prisons in New Jersey
- Stevens Institute of Technology
- Stevens, John
- Stone Pony
- Structures in New Jersey
  - commons:Category:Buildings and structures in New Jersey
- Stuyvesant, Peter
- Superfund sites in New Jersey
- Swit, Loretta
- Sybil's Cave
- Symbols of the State of New Jersey
  - Category:Symbols of New Jersey
    - commons:Category:Symbols of New Jersey

== T ==
- Telecommunications in New Jersey
  - commons:Category:Communications in New Jersey
- Telephone area codes in New Jersey
- Television stations in New Jersey
- Terrace Pond
- Teterboro Airport
- Theatres in New Jersey
  - commons:Category:Theatres in New Jersey
- Theta Networks
- Thomas Edison State College
- Tillie, murals
- Toms River (river)
- Toms River (village)
- Tourism in New Jersey website
  - commons:Category:Tourism in New Jersey
- Transportation in New Jersey
  - Category:Transportation in New Jersey
    - commons:Category:Transport in New Jersey
- Trenton, New Jersey, state capital since 1784, national capital 1784
- Trenton Thunder
- Trump, Donald
- Tuckahoe River
- Battle of Turtle Gut Inlet

== U ==
- Union Hotel
- United Airlines Flight 93
- United States of America
  - States of the United States of America
  - United States Attorney for the District of New Jersey
  - United States census statistical areas of New Jersey
  - New Jersey's congressional delegations
  - United States congressional districts in New Jersey
  - United States Court of Appeals for the Third Circuit
  - United States District Court for the District of New Jersey
  - United States representatives from New Jersey
  - United States senators from New Jersey
- United Water
- Universities and colleges in New Jersey
- University of Medicine and Dentistry of New Jersey
- Upper New York Bay
- U.S. Route 1 in New Jersey
- U.S. Route 9 in New Jersey
- U.S. Route 30 in New Jersey
- U.S. Route 40 in New Jersey
- U.S. Route 46
- US-NJ – ISO 3166-2:US region code for the State of New Jersey
- USS New Jersey

== V ==
- Verrazzano, Giovanni da
- Vezzetti, Thomas
- Vehicle registration plates of New Jersey

== W ==
- The War of the Worlds
- Washington, George
- Watchung Mountains
- Water parks in New Jersey
- Waterfalls of New Jersey
  - commons:Category:Waterfalls of New Jersey
- Wawayanda State Park
- Weehawken
- Weehawken Cove
- Weird NJ
- West Jersey
- West Orange
- Weston, Edward
- The Wetlands Institute
- Wharton State Forest
- Whitman, Christine Todd
- Whitman, Walt
- Wheaton Industries
  Wikimedia
  - Wikimedia Commons:Category:New Jersey
    - commons:Category:Maps of New Jersey
  - Wikinews:Category:New Jersey
    - Wikinews:Portal:New Jersey
  - Wikipedia Category:New Jersey
    - Wikipedia Portal:New Jersey
    - Wikipedia:WikiProject New Jersey
      - Category:WikiProject New Jersey articles
      - Category:WikiProject New Jersey participants
- William Paterson University
- Williams, William Carlos
- Wilson, Robert
- Wilson, Woodrow
- Wind power in New Jersey
- Witherspoon, John
- Woodrow Wilson School of Public and International Affairs
- World Trade Center bombing

== Y ==
- Yousef, Ramzi

== Z ==
- Zoos in New Jersey
  - commons:Category:Zoos in New Jersey

== See also ==
- Topic overview:
  - New Jersey
  - Outline of New Jersey
