= New Jersey (disambiguation) =

New Jersey is a U.S. state.

New Jersey may also refer to:

- Province of New Jersey, before independence in 1776
- USS New Jersey (BB-16), a battleship commissioned in 1906
- USS New Jersey (BB-62), a battleship commissioned in 1943, now a museum ship in Camden, New Jersey
- USS New Jersey (SSN-796), a Block IV Virginia-class submarine ordered from General Dynamics.
- College of New Jersey, a public university in Ewing, New Jersey

== Media ==
- New Jersey (album), a 1988 album by Bon Jovi
- New Jersey: The Videos, a 1989 video album by Bon Jovi
- New Jersey: The Movie, a 2009 documentary film

== Sports ==
- New Jersey Lions, the athletic teams of the College of New Jersey
- New Jersey Devils, members of the Metropolitan Division of the Eastern Conference of the National Hockey League (NHL) (1982)
