= New Jersey statistical areas =

Coordinates: 40.1907°N 74.6728°W

The U.S. State of New Jersey currently has nine statistical areas that have been delineated by the Office of Management and Budget (OMB). On July 21, 2023, the OMB delineated three combined statistical areas and six metropolitan statistical areas in New Jersey. As of 2023, the largest of these is the New York-Newark, NY-NJ-CT-PA CSA, which includes New Jersey's largest city, Newark, and capital, Trenton.

New Jersey is the most urban of the 50 U.S. states with the highest population density of any state. Each of the 21 counties of New Jersey is located in one of its six metropolitan statistical areas.

== Statistical areas ==
The Office of Management and Budget (OMB) has designated more than 1,000 statistical areas for the United States and Puerto Rico. These statistical areas are important geographic delineations of population clusters used by the OMB, the United States Census Bureau, planning organizations, and federal, state, and local government entities.

The OMB defines a core-based statistical area (commonly referred to as a CBSA) as the county or counties (or county-equivalents) surrounding at least one densely-settled core of at least 10,000 population, "plus adjacent counties having a high degree of social and economic integration with the core as measured through commuting ties with the counties containing the core". The OMB further divides core-based statistical areas based on population into metropolitan statistical areas (MSAs) for those with at least 50,000 and micropolitan statistical areas (μSAs) for those with 10,000 to 49,999 people.

The OMB defines a combined statistical area (CSA) as two or more adjacent core-based statistical areas where the employment interchange rate (% commuting from A to B plus % commuting from B to A) is at least 15%. The primary statistical areas (PSAs) include all combined statistical areas and any core-based statistical area that is not a constituent of a combined statistical area.

The nine United States statistical areas and 21 counties of the State of New Jersey (Note: An out-of-state area and its population are displayed in green. An area that extends into more than one state is displayed in purple. A purple population number over a black population number show the total population versus the in-state population. The state's abbreviation is also shown next to the in-state total.)
Combined statistical area	2025 population (est.)	Core-based statistical area	2025 population (est.)	County-equivalent	2025 population (est.)	Metropolitan division	2025 population (est.)
New York-Newark, NY-NJ-CT-PA CSA	22,535,017; 7,572,719 (NJ)	New York-Newark-Jersey City, NY-NJ MSA	20,112,448; 7,110,622 (NJ)	Kings County, New York	2,653,963	New York-Jersey City-White Plains, NY-NJ MD	12,300,480; 2,243,683 (NJ)
New York-Newark, NY-NJ-CT-PA CSA	22,535,017; 7,572,719 (NJ)	New York-Newark-Jersey City, NY-NJ MSA	20,112,448; 7,110,622 (NJ)	Queens County, New York	2,358,182	New York-Jersey City-White Plains, NY-NJ MD	12,300,480; 2,243,683 (NJ)
New York-Newark, NY-NJ-CT-PA CSA	22,535,017; 7,572,719 (NJ)	New York-Newark-Jersey City, NY-NJ MSA	20,112,448; 7,110,622 (NJ)	New York County, New York	1,664,862	New York-Jersey City-White Plains, NY-NJ MD	12,300,480; 2,243,683 (NJ)
New York-Newark, NY-NJ-CT-PA CSA	22,535,017; 7,572,719 (NJ)	New York-Newark-Jersey City, NY-NJ MSA	20,112,448; 7,110,622 (NJ)	Bronx County, New York	1,406,332	New York-Jersey City-White Plains, NY-NJ MD	12,300,480; 2,243,683 (NJ)
New York-Newark, NY-NJ-CT-PA CSA	22,535,017; 7,572,719 (NJ)	New York-Newark-Jersey City, NY-NJ MSA	20,112,448; 7,110,622 (NJ)	Westchester County, New York	1,015,743	New York-Jersey City-White Plains, NY-NJ MD	12,300,480; 2,243,683 (NJ)
New York-Newark, NY-NJ-CT-PA CSA	22,535,017; 7,572,719 (NJ)	New York-Newark-Jersey City, NY-NJ MSA	20,112,448; 7,110,622 (NJ)	Bergen County, New Jersey	977,026	New York-Jersey City-White Plains, NY-NJ MD	12,300,480; 2,243,683 (NJ)
New York-Newark, NY-NJ-CT-PA CSA	22,535,017; 7,572,719 (NJ)	New York-Newark-Jersey City, NY-NJ MSA	20,112,448; 7,110,622 (NJ)	Hudson County, New Jersey	735,033	New York-Jersey City-White Plains, NY-NJ MD	12,300,480; 2,243,683 (NJ)
New York-Newark, NY-NJ-CT-PA CSA	22,535,017; 7,572,719 (NJ)	New York-Newark-Jersey City, NY-NJ MSA	20,112,448; 7,110,622 (NJ)	Passaic County, New Jersey	531,624	New York-Jersey City-White Plains, NY-NJ MD	12,300,480; 2,243,683 (NJ)
New York-Newark, NY-NJ-CT-PA CSA	22,535,017; 7,572,719 (NJ)	New York-Newark-Jersey City, NY-NJ MSA	20,112,448; 7,110,622 (NJ)	Richmond County, New York	501,290	New York-Jersey City-White Plains, NY-NJ MD	12,300,480; 2,243,683 (NJ)
New York-Newark, NY-NJ-CT-PA CSA	22,535,017; 7,572,719 (NJ)	New York-Newark-Jersey City, NY-NJ MSA	20,112,448; 7,110,622 (NJ)	Rockland County, New York	357,397	New York-Jersey City-White Plains, NY-NJ MD	12,300,480; 2,243,683 (NJ)
New York-Newark, NY-NJ-CT-PA CSA	22,535,017; 7,572,719 (NJ)	New York-Newark-Jersey City, NY-NJ MSA	20,112,448; 7,110,622 (NJ)	Putnam County, New York	99,028	New York-Jersey City-White Plains, NY-NJ MD	12,300,480; 2,243,683 (NJ)
New York-Newark, NY-NJ-CT-PA CSA	22,535,017; 7,572,719 (NJ)	New York-Newark-Jersey City, NY-NJ MSA	20,112,448; 7,110,622 (NJ)	Suffolk County, New York	1,546,090	Nassau County-Suffolk County, NY MD	2,945,029
New York-Newark, NY-NJ-CT-PA CSA	22,535,017; 7,572,719 (NJ)	New York-Newark-Jersey City, NY-NJ MSA	20,112,448; 7,110,622 (NJ)	Nassau County, New York	1,398,939	Nassau County-Suffolk County, NY MD	2,945,029
New York-Newark, NY-NJ-CT-PA CSA	22,535,017; 7,572,719 (NJ)	New York-Newark-Jersey City, NY-NJ MSA	20,112,448; 7,110,622 (NJ)	Middlesex County, New Jersey	883,335	Lakewood-New Brunswick, NJ MD	2,564,602
New York-Newark, NY-NJ-CT-PA CSA	22,535,017; 7,572,719 (NJ)	New York-Newark-Jersey City, NY-NJ MSA	20,112,448; 7,110,622 (NJ)	Ocean County, New Jersey	673,746	Lakewood-New Brunswick, NJ MD	2,564,602
New York-Newark, NY-NJ-CT-PA CSA	22,535,017; 7,572,719 (NJ)	New York-Newark-Jersey City, NY-NJ MSA	20,112,448; 7,110,622 (NJ)	Monmouth County, New Jersey	651,035	Lakewood-New Brunswick, NJ MD	2,564,602
New York-Newark, NY-NJ-CT-PA CSA	22,535,017; 7,572,719 (NJ)	New York-Newark-Jersey City, NY-NJ MSA	20,112,448; 7,110,622 (NJ)	Somerset County, New Jersey	356,486	Lakewood-New Brunswick, NJ MD	2,564,602
New York-Newark, NY-NJ-CT-PA CSA	22,535,017; 7,572,719 (NJ)	New York-Newark-Jersey City, NY-NJ MSA	20,112,448; 7,110,622 (NJ)	Essex County, New Jersey	896,379	Newark, NJ MD	2,302,337
New York-Newark, NY-NJ-CT-PA CSA	22,535,017; 7,572,719 (NJ)	New York-Newark-Jersey City, NY-NJ MSA	20,112,448; 7,110,622 (NJ)	Union County, New Jersey	601,863	Newark, NJ MD	2,302,337
New York-Newark, NY-NJ-CT-PA CSA	22,535,017; 7,572,719 (NJ)	New York-Newark-Jersey City, NY-NJ MSA	20,112,448; 7,110,622 (NJ)	Morris County, New Jersey	524,251	Newark, NJ MD	2,302,337
New York-Newark, NY-NJ-CT-PA CSA	22,535,017; 7,572,719 (NJ)	New York-Newark-Jersey City, NY-NJ MSA	20,112,448; 7,110,622 (NJ)	Sussex County, New Jersey	148,063	Newark, NJ MD	2,302,337
New York-Newark, NY-NJ-CT-PA CSA	22,535,017; 7,572,719 (NJ)	New York-Newark-Jersey City, NY-NJ MSA	20,112,448; 7,110,622 (NJ)	Hunterdon County, New Jersey	131,781	Newark, NJ MD	2,302,337
New York-Newark, NY-NJ-CT-PA CSA	22,535,017; 7,572,719 (NJ)	Bridgeport-Stamford-Danbury, CT MSA	951,558	Western Connecticut Planning Region, Connecticut	640,482	none	
New York-Newark, NY-NJ-CT-PA CSA	22,535,017; 7,572,719 (NJ)	Bridgeport-Stamford-Danbury, CT MSA	951,558	Greater Bridgeport Planning Region, Connecticut	337,697	none	
New York-Newark, NY-NJ-CT-PA CSA	22,535,017; 7,572,719 (NJ)	Kiryas Joel-Poughkeepsie-Newburgh, NY MSA	718,377	Orange County, New York	417,669	none	
New York-Newark, NY-NJ-CT-PA CSA	22,535,017; 7,572,719 (NJ)	Kiryas Joel-Poughkeepsie-Newburgh, NY MSA	718,377	Dutchess County, New York	300,708	none	
New York-Newark, NY-NJ-CT-PA CSA	22,535,017; 7,572,719 (NJ)	Trenton-Princeton, NJ MSA	399,289	Mercer County, New Jersey	399,289	none	
New York-Newark, NY-NJ-CT-PA CSA	22,535,017; 7,572,719 (NJ)	Kingston, NY MSA	183,330	Ulster County, New York	183,330	none	
New York-Newark, NY-NJ-CT-PA CSA	22,535,017; 7,572,719 (NJ)	Monticello, NY μSA	80,586	Sullivan County, New York	80,586	none	
New York-Newark, NY-NJ-CT-PA CSA	22,535,017; 7,572,719 (NJ)	Hemlock Farms, PA μSA	62,808	Pike County, Pennsylvania	62,808	none	
Philadelphia-Reading-Camden, PA-NJ-DE-MD CSA	7,493,171; 1,925,351 (NJ)	Philadelphia-Camden-Wilmington, PA-NJ-DE-MD MSA	6,329,118; 1,396,156 (NJ)	Philadelphia County, Pennsylvania	1,574,281	Philadelphia, PA MD	2,127,262
Philadelphia-Reading-Camden, PA-NJ-DE-MD CSA	7,493,171; 1,925,351 (NJ)	Philadelphia-Camden-Wilmington, PA-NJ-DE-MD MSA	6,329,118; 1,396,156 (NJ)	Delaware County, Pennsylvania	580,937	Philadelphia, PA MD	2,127,262
Philadelphia-Reading-Camden, PA-NJ-DE-MD CSA	7,493,171; 1,925,351 (NJ)	Philadelphia-Camden-Wilmington, PA-NJ-DE-MD MSA	6,329,118; 1,396,156 (NJ)	Montgomery County, Pennsylvania	877,643	Montgomery County-Bucks County-Chester County, PA MD	2,082,587
Philadelphia-Reading-Camden, PA-NJ-DE-MD CSA	7,493,171; 1,925,351 (NJ)	Philadelphia-Camden-Wilmington, PA-NJ-DE-MD MSA	6,329,118; 1,396,156 (NJ)	Bucks County, Pennsylvania	647,828	Montgomery County-Bucks County-Chester County, PA MD	2,082,587
Philadelphia-Reading-Camden, PA-NJ-DE-MD CSA	7,493,171; 1,925,351 (NJ)	Philadelphia-Camden-Wilmington, PA-NJ-DE-MD MSA	6,329,118; 1,396,156 (NJ)	Chester County, Pennsylvania	557,116	Montgomery County-Bucks County-Chester County, PA MD	2,082,587
Philadelphia-Reading-Camden, PA-NJ-DE-MD CSA	7,493,171; 1,925,351 (NJ)	Philadelphia-Camden-Wilmington, PA-NJ-DE-MD MSA	6,329,118; 1,396,156 (NJ)	Camden County, New Jersey	535,799	Camden, NJ MD	1,329,876
Philadelphia-Reading-Camden, PA-NJ-DE-MD CSA	7,493,171; 1,925,351 (NJ)	Philadelphia-Camden-Wilmington, PA-NJ-DE-MD MSA	6,329,118; 1,396,156 (NJ)	Burlington County, New Jersey	481,439	Camden, NJ MD	1,329,876
Philadelphia-Reading-Camden, PA-NJ-DE-MD CSA	7,493,171; 1,925,351 (NJ)	Philadelphia-Camden-Wilmington, PA-NJ-DE-MD MSA	6,329,118; 1,396,156 (NJ)	Gloucester County, New Jersey	312,638	Camden, NJ MD	1,329,876
Philadelphia-Reading-Camden, PA-NJ-DE-MD CSA	7,493,171; 1,925,351 (NJ)	Philadelphia-Camden-Wilmington, PA-NJ-DE-MD MSA	6,329,118; 1,396,156 (NJ)	New Castle County, Delaware	588,026	Wilmington, DE-MD-NJ MD	761,437; 65,338 (NJ)
Philadelphia-Reading-Camden, PA-NJ-DE-MD CSA	7,493,171; 1,925,351 (NJ)	Philadelphia-Camden-Wilmington, PA-NJ-DE-MD MSA	6,329,118; 1,396,156 (NJ)	Cecil County, Maryland	107,131	Wilmington, DE-MD-NJ MD	761,437; 65,338 (NJ)
Philadelphia-Reading-Camden, PA-NJ-DE-MD CSA	7,493,171; 1,925,351 (NJ)	Philadelphia-Camden-Wilmington, PA-NJ-DE-MD MSA	6,329,118; 1,396,156 (NJ)	Salem County, New Jersey	66,280	Wilmington, DE-MD-NJ MD	761,437; 65,338 (NJ)
Philadelphia-Reading-Camden, PA-NJ-DE-MD CSA	7,493,171; 1,925,351 (NJ)	Reading, PA MSA	440,072	Berks County, Pennsylvania	440,072	none	
Philadelphia-Reading-Camden, PA-NJ-DE-MD CSA	7,493,171; 1,925,351 (NJ)	Atlantic City-Hammonton, NJ MSA	372,047	Atlantic County, New Jersey	278,657	none	
Philadelphia-Reading-Camden, PA-NJ-DE-MD CSA	7,493,171; 1,925,351 (NJ)	Atlantic City-Hammonton, NJ MSA	372,047	Cape May County, New Jersey	93,390	none	
Philadelphia-Reading-Camden, PA-NJ-DE-MD CSA	7,493,171; 1,925,351 (NJ)	Dover, DE MSA	194,786	Kent County, Delaware	194,786	none	
Philadelphia-Reading-Camden, PA-NJ-DE-MD CSA	7,493,171; 1,925,351 (NJ)	Vineland, NJ MSA	157,148	Cumberland County, New Jersey	157,148	none	
Allentown-Bethlehem-East Stroudsburg, PA-NJ CSA	1,054,794; 112,953 (NJ)	Allentown-Bethlehem-Easton, PA-NJ MSA	887,615; 112,953 (NJ)	Lehigh County, Pennsylvania	384,383	none	
Allentown-Bethlehem-East Stroudsburg, PA-NJ CSA	1,054,794; 112,953 (NJ)	Allentown-Bethlehem-Easton, PA-NJ MSA	887,615; 112,953 (NJ)	Northampton County, Pennsylvania	324,411	none	
Allentown-Bethlehem-East Stroudsburg, PA-NJ CSA	1,054,794; 112,953 (NJ)	Allentown-Bethlehem-Easton, PA-NJ MSA	887,615; 112,953 (NJ)	Warren County, New Jersey	112,953	none	
Allentown-Bethlehem-East Stroudsburg, PA-NJ CSA	1,054,794; 112,953 (NJ)	Allentown-Bethlehem-Easton, PA-NJ MSA	887,615; 112,953 (NJ)	Carbon County, Pennsylvania	65,868	none	
Allentown-Bethlehem-East Stroudsburg, PA-NJ CSA	1,054,794; 112,953 (NJ)	East Stroudsburg, PA MSA	167,179	Monroe County, Pennsylvania	167,179	none	
State of New Jersey					9,548,215	none	

The six core-based statistical areas of the State of New Jersey (Note: For CBSAs comprising populations from multiple states, they are listed twice to show both their intrastate population within that CBSA as well as the CBSA's total population. Only the intrastate population is ranked.)
2025 rank	Core-based statistical area	Population				
2025 rank	Core-based statistical area	2025 estimate	Change	2020 Census	Change	2010 Census
1	New York-Newark-Jersey City, NY-NJ MSA (NJ)	7,110,622	+2.82%	6,915,597	+6.87%	6,471,215
2	Philadelphia-Camden-Wilmington, PA-NJ-DE-MD MSA (NJ)	1,396,156	+3.23%	1,352,476	+2.71%	1,316,762
3	Trenton-Princeton, NJ MSA	399,289	+3.08%	387,340	+5.68%	366,513
4	Atlantic City-Hammonton, NJ MSA	372,047	+0.61%	369,797	−0.54%	371,814
5	Vineland-Bridgeton, NJ MSA	157,148	+1.94%	154,152	−1.75%	156,898
6	Allentown-Bethlehem-Easton, PA-NJ MSA (NJ)	112,953	+3.03%	109,632	+0.86%	108,692
	Allentown-Bethlehem-Easton, PA-NJ MSA	887,615	+2.98%	861,889	+4.96%	821,173
	New York-Newark-Jersey City, NY-NJ MSA	20,112,448	+0.15%	20,081,535	+6.59%	18,839,740
	Philadelphia-Camden-Wilmington, PA-NJ-DE-MD MSA	6,329,118	+1.35%	6,245,051	+4.69%	5,965,343

The three combined statistical areas of the State of New Jersey (Note: For CSAs comprising populations from multiple states, they are listed twice to show both their intrastate population within that CSA as well as the CSA's total population. Only the intrastate population is ranked. New York CSA's overall population is not listed due to lack of historic census data for Connecticut planning regions.)
2025 rank	Combined statistical area	Population				
2025 rank	Combined statistical area	2025 estimate	Change	2020 Census	Change	2010 Census
1	New York-Newark, NY-NJ-CT-PA CSA (NJ)	7,572,719	+3.69%	7,302,937	+6.80%	6,837,728
2	Philadelphia-Reading-Camden, PA-NJ-DE-MD CSA (NJ)	1,925,351	+2.61%	1,876,425	+1.68%	1,845,474
3	Allentown-Bethlehem-East Stroudsburg, PA-NJ CSA (NJ)	112,953	+3.03%	109,632	+0.86%	108,692
	Allentown-Bethlehem-East Stroudsburg CSA	1,054,794	+2.39%	1,030,216	+3.96%	991,015
	Philadelphia-Reading-Camden, PA-NJ-DE-MD CSA	7,493,171	+1.54%	7,379,700	+4.41%	7,067,807

== Metropolitan statistical areas ==
MSAs and divisions of New Jersey; counties shaded in blue hues are in the New York City metro; counties shaded in green hues are in the Philadelphia metro.

New Jersey has seven metropolitan statistical areas (MSAs) defined by the federal Office of Management and Budget. The New York City and Philadelphia MSAs are also divided into divisions, of which there are five in New Jersey. Every statistical area and county in New Jersey belongs to the Northeast Megalopolis.

- New York-Newark-Jersey City, NY-NJ-CT-PA Metropolitan Statistical Area (19,979,477)
  - New York-Jersey City-White Plains NY-NJ Metropolitan Division (2,116,063)
    - Bergen County (936,692)
    - Hudson County (676,061)
    - Passaic County (503,310)
  - Edison NJ Metropolitan Division (2,383,854)
    - Middlesex County (829,685)
    - Monmouth County (621,354)
    - Ocean County (601,651)
    - Somerset County (331,164)
  - Newark-Union, NJ-PA Metropolitan Division (2,117,575)
    - Essex County (799,767)
    - Hunterdon County (124,714)
    - Morris County (494,228)
    - Sussex County (140,799)
    - Union County (558,067)
  - Trenton-Princeton, NJ Metropolitan Statistical Area (369,811)
    - Mercer County (369,811)
- Allentown-Bethlehem-Easton, PA-NJ Metropolitan Statistical Area (842,913)
  - Warren County (105,779)
- Philadelphia-Camden-Wilmington, PA-NJ-DE-MD Metropolitan Statistical Area (6,096,372)
  - Camden, NJ Metropolitan Division (1,243,870)
    - Burlington County (445,384)
    - Camden County (507,078)
    - Gloucester County (291,408)
  - Wilmington, DE-MD-NJ Metropolitan Division (724,768)
    - Salem County (62,607)
  - Atlantic City-Hammonton, NJ Metropolitan Statistical Area (265,429)
    - Atlantic County (265,429)
  - Vineland-Bridgeton, NJ Metropolitan Statistical Area (150,972)
    - Cumberland County (150,972)
  - Ocean City, NJ Metropolitan Statistical Area (92,560)
    - Cape May County (92,560)

== See also ==
- Demographics of New Jersey
- Geography of New Jersey
- Metropolitan statistical areas of New Jersey
