= Area codes 201 and 551 =

Area codes in New Jersey, United States

Coordinates: 40.8678°N 74.4379°W

Numbering plan areas and area codes of New Jersey

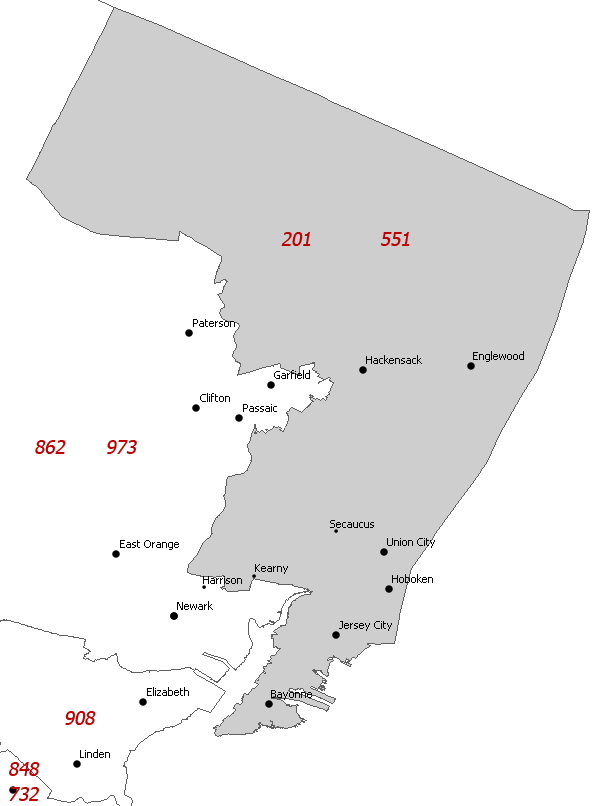
Map of numbering plan area 201/551

Area codes 201 and 551 are telephone area codes in the North American Numbering Plan (NANP) in the U.S. State of New Jersey. 201 is the lowest-numbered area code in use in the NANP, as well as the lowest possible under the current system, in which an initial digit of 0 or 1 is forbidden. Area code 201 was the area code assigned to the entire state of New Jersey in 1947, when the North American area code system was formed. After splits in 1956, 1991, and 1997, it is assigned to the northeastern portion of the state, including most of Hudson and Bergen counties, bordering New York City. Major cities in the numbering plan area include Bayonne, Jersey City, Hoboken, Hackensack, Secaucus and Englewood. Area code 551 was added to this numbering plan area in 2001 in formation of an overlay. Area code 201 is also assigned for wireless services in some rate centers in the 973 and 908 numbering plan areas, such as Newark, Morristown, and New Brunswick.

== History ==
Area code 201 was the first numbering plan area (NPA) code of the original 86 area codes when the American Telephone and Telegraph Company (AT&T) devised the nationwide numbering plan in 1947. It was also the first area code with Direct Distance Dialing (DDD) service, when in 1951 the first direct-dialed long-distance call was made from Englewood, New Jersey to Alameda, California.

Division of New Jersey into two numbering plan areas in 1956. However, it was not until July 1963, when New Jersey customers were required to dial the area code when calling to a location in the state, but outside of their own numbering plan area.

Area code 201 was originally assigned to the entire state of New Jersey, despite the state's population density, the highest in the nation. The bulk of New Jersey's population is concentrated in the large metropolitan area west of New York City in the northeast and the suburbs of Philadelphia in the southwest. The geographic coverage of numbering plan areas was based on several criteria. A numbering plan area could only have a maximum of 540 central offices; larger states needed to be divided. In addition, the call routing infrastructure had to be suitable to be centrally coordinated by only one toll center without expensive back-haul arrangements. For the latter reason, by 1956, 201 was reduced to northern New Jersey, while the area from the state capital, Trenton, southward, including the southern Jersey Shore and the New Jersey side of the lower Delaware Valley, received area code 609. This separated the two population centers into distinct call routing systems for out-of-state long-distance calls. Despite the division with two area codes, all calls within the state of New Jersey were dialed without area codes until July 21, 1963, when office code protection was ended.

For over thirty years, area code 201 served Bergen, Hudson, Ocean, Essex, Union, Morris, Passaic, Hunterdon, Somerset, Middlesex, Monmouth, Sussex and Warren counties.

As the central region of New Jersey grew during the 1980s, the northeastern section of the state lost sizable portions of its population due to the decline of its major cities, including Newark, Paterson, Clifton, and Elizabeth. On June 8, 1991, area code 908 was created by a split of numbering plan area 201; it primarily serves the north-central regions of the state.

Within four years, 201 was close to exhaustion once again due to the proliferation of cell phones, pagers and fax machines. On June 1, 1997, Essex and Passaic counties, home to Newark and Paterson, respectively, the state's largest and third-largest cities, as well as Morris and Sussex counties were split off with area code 973. This left Hudson and Bergen counties, the two most densely populated counties in the state and the closest to New York City, as the only counties in the 201 plan area.

Although the 1997 split was intended as a long-term solution, demand for new numbers continued in Hudson and Bergen counties, and another area code became necessary. Verizon, the dominant telephone company in New Jersey, lobbied for an overlay rather than a split. Overlays were a new concept at the time, and were controversial because they required implementation of ten-digit dialing. However, Verizon wanted to spare its customers the burden of changing telephone numbers.

Area code 551 was created in 2001 to overlay 201, along with area codes 862 and 848, which overlay area codes 973 and 732, respectively. With the implementation of the overlays on December 1, 2001, ten-digit dialing became mandatory in Northern New Jersey.

== See also ==
- List of New Jersey area codes
- List of North American Numbering Plan area codes

New Jersey area codes: 201/551, 609/640, 732/848, 856, 908, 852/973
	North: 845/329	
West: 973/862	201/551	East: 212/646/332, 718/347/929, 914, 917
	South: 973/862, 718/347/929, 917	
New York area codes: 212/332/646, 315/680, 363/516, 518/838, 585, 607, 631/934, 624/716, 347/718/929, 329/845, 914, 917
