= Area code 856 =

Telephone area code for southwestern New Jersey

Coordinates: 39.9310°N 75.0393°W

Numbering plan areas and area codes of New Jersey

Area code 856 is a telephone area code in the North American Numbering Plan (NANP) for the southwestern part of the U.S. state of New Jersey. The numbering plan area (NPA) includes the Camden, Cherry Hill, and Vineland areas and a small part of Willingboro Township and the western part of Burlington County. 856 is essentially coextensive with the New Jersey side of the Philadelphia metropolitan area.

The area code was created in 1999 in a split of area code 609.

== History ==
The entire state of New Jersey was assigned area code 201 in 1947, when the American Telephone and Telegraph Company (AT&T) established a nationwide telephone numbering plan for use in Operator Toll Dialing, which later developed into the North American Numbering plan. The area code had its debut in customer-dialed communication in 1951, with the first trial of Direct Distance Dialing (DDD).

In 1956, the administration divided the state into two numbering plan areas, retaining 201 for the northern part, while the southern part of the state received area code 609. However, no area codes were needed for all calls between the two numbering plan areas until 1963.

With the increasing demand for telephone numbers by businesses, increased used of fax machines, pagers and cell phones, area code 609 exhausted its numbering capacity. Area code 856 was announced by Bell Atlantic in March 1999, and was approved by the New Jersey Board of Public Utilities shortly thereafter. The new area code became operational on June 12, 1999. A permissive dialing period of five months ended on November 13, 1999, during which seven-digit was still permitted.

Prior to October 2021, area code 856 had telephone numbers assigned for the central office code 988. In 2020, 988 was designated nationwide as a dialing code for the National Suicide Prevention Lifeline, which created a conflict for exchanges that permit seven-digit dialing. This area code was therefore scheduled to transition to ten-digit dialing by October 24, 2021.

== See also ==
- List of New Jersey area codes
- List of North American Numbering Plan area codes

New Jersey area codes: 201/551, 609/640, 732/848, 856, 908, 852/973
	North: 215/267/445, 484/610	
West: 302	856	East: 609/640
	South: 302	
Delaware area codes: 302
Pennsylvania area codes: 215/267/445, 412, 570/272, 610/484/835, 717/223, 724, 814/582, 878
