= Area code 908 =

Telephone area code for north-central New Jersey

Coordinates: 40.4744°N 74.4258°W

Numbering plan areas and area codes of New Jersey

Area code 908 is a telephone area code in the North American Numbering Plan (NANP) in the northern part of the U.S. state of New Jersey. The numbering plan area (NPA) comprises communities in Union County, Somerset County, northern parts of Middlesex County, Hunterdon County, Warren County, and parts of Morris County as well as some cell phones in Monmouth and Ocean Counties.

== History ==
Area code 201, originally the only area code for New Jersey when the first nationwide telephone numbering plan was created in 1947, had been the area code for all of northern and central New Jersey since 1956.

In June 1989, New Jersey Bell announced a split of numbering plan area 201 to create a new area code, 908, in North Jersey. During a permissive dialing period, which ended on June 8, 1991, existing telephone numbers in the service area could be dialed with area codes 201 or 908. Customers in the remaining 201 area had to prefix existing and new numbers in 908 with 1-908. At the time of the split, 1.5 million access lines were served by the new area code.

On January 1, 1997, 908 was reduced to its western portion, forming area code 732 in the central-eastern region of New Jersey. It was the penultimate area code added in the X0X format when 909 was added a year later in California.

Middlesex County is largely 908 in South Plainfield and parts of Edison (particularly Inman Avenue and north of Oak Tree Road) and Piscataway (particularly the New Market area near Plainfield). 908 and the Philadelphia metropolitan area's 856 are the only area codes in the state that have yet to be overlaid.

Before October 2021, area code 908 had telephone numbers assigned for the central office code 988. In 2020, 988 was designated nationwide as a dialing code for the National Suicide Prevention Lifeline, which created a conflict for exchanges that permit seven-digit dialing. This area code was therefore scheduled to transition to ten-digit dialing by October 24, 2021.

== See also ==
- List of New Jersey area codes
- List of North American Numbering Plan area codes

New Jersey area codes: 201/551, 609/640, 732/848, 856, 908, 852/973
	North: 862/973	
West: 484/610, 570/272	908	East: 347/718/929/917
	South: 215/267/445, 609/640, 732/848	
New York area codes: 212/332/646, 315/680, 363/516, 518/838, 585, 607, 631/934, 624/716, 347/718/929, 329/845, 914, 917
Pennsylvania area codes: 215/267/445, 412, 570/272, 610/484/835, 717/223, 724, 814/582, 878
