= Area codes 732 and 848 =

New Jersey, United States area codes

Coordinates: 40.1839°N 74.0370°W

Numbering plan areas and area codes of New Jersey

Area codes 732 and 848 are telephone area codes in the North American Numbering Plan (NANP) for parts of the U.S. state of New Jersey.

== History ==
In the original configuration of the first nationwide telephone numbering plan of 1947, all of New Jersey was a single numbering plan area (NPA), assigned the first of all area codes, 201. By 1956, it was split to create a second numbering plan area, 609. This division generally followed the dividing line between North Jersey, proximate to New York City, and South Jersey, proximate to Philadelphia and the Jersey Shore. Despite the division into two numbering plan areas, all calls within the state of New Jersey were dialed without area codes until July 21, 1963.

This configuration of two area code in New Jersey remained in place for c. 35 years, until 1991, when the 201 numbering plan area was further divided to create area code 908 in its southern half. This made available more central office prefixes in the northern part, comprising the densely populated western suburbs of New York City, as well as in the area south of Newark, which fell into NPA 908.

On June 1, 1997, services growth in numbering plan area 908 required splitting the area with a new area code (732) assigned to its southeastern half, along the Atlantic seaboard. 732 spells SEA -- the first three letters of the word "seashore" -- on a telephone keypad; it is not known, however, if choosing this particular area code was specifically for that purpose, or just a happy coincidence.

Following a six-month grace period, the use of the 732 area code became mandatory on December 6 of that year. The area includes Middlesex, Somerset, and Union counties in Northern and Central New Jersey, and Monmouth and northern Ocean counties on the New Jersey Shore.

The assignment of area code 848 to the same numbering plan area in 2001 created an overlay complex for this region, after the pool of 732-numbers began to exhaust rapidly.

With the introduction of the area code 848 overlay, 10-digit dialing became mandatory (on December 1, 2001). The 732/848 area, excluding the portion in Union County, generally defines the Central New Jersey region while 609/640/856 and 908/201/551/862/973 generally mark Southern New Jersey and Northern New Jersey, respectively.

== See also ==
- List of New Jersey area codes
- List of North American Numbering Plan area codes

New Jersey area codes: 201/551, 609/640, 732/848, 856, 908, 852/973
| | North: 908 | |
| West: 609/640, 908 | 732/848 | East: 718/347/929/917, Atlantic Ocean |
| | South: 609/640 | |
New York area codes: 212/332/646, 315/680, 363/516, 518/838, 585, 607, 631/934, 624/716, 347/718/929, 329/845, 914, 917
