= Area codes 973 and 862 =

Telephone area codes in northern New Jersey

Numbering plan areas and area codes of New Jersey

Area codes 973 and 862 are telephone area codes in the North American Numbering Plan (NANP) for the northernmost part of the U.S. state of New Jersey. The numbering plan area (NPA) comprises the counties, or parts, of Bergen, Essex, Hudson, Morris, Passaic, Sussex and Union Counties. Cities in this service area include Newark, Paterson, Clifton, Passaic, Montclair, Morristown, Parsippany, Dover, Maplewood, and The Oranges.

Area code 973 was created on June 1, 1997, in an area code split of the 201 numbering plan area, which was the original area code for of all of New Jersey when the American Telephone and Telegraph Company (AT&T) introduced the first nationwide telephone numbering plan for Operator Toll Dialing in 1947. In 1956, the numbering plan area was reduced to the northern half of the state, assigning a new area code (609) in the south, and in 1991 to just the northeastern part, through area code splits. Due to the expansion of cell phones, pagers, and fax machines in the 1990s, the area code experienced the possible exhaustion of the numbering pool.

The assignment of 973 was intended as a long-term solution. However, within three years it was close to exhaustion once again. For relief, the numbering plan area was converted to an overlay complex with a second area code, 862, making ten-digit dialing mandatory on December 1, 2001. This overlay was rolled out in conjunction with two other overlays in the northern half of the state. Verizon, the main telephone provider in the region, pressed for an overlay to spare North Jerseyans the expense and burden of having to change their numbers for the second time in a decade.

== See also ==
- List of New Jersey area codes
- List of North American Numbering Plan area codes

New Jersey area codes: 201/551, 609/640, 732/848, 856, 908, 852/973
	North: 845/329	
West: 272/570, 908	862/973	East: 201/551
	South: 609/640, 908, 732	
New York area codes: 212/332/646, 315/680, 363/516, 518/838, 585, 607, 631/934, 624/716, 347/718/929, 329/845, 914, 917
Pennsylvania area codes: 215/267/445, 412, 570/272, 610/484/835, 717/223, 724, 814/582, 878
