= List of ghost towns in New Jersey =

This is an incomplete list of ghost towns in New Jersey.

== Burlington County ==
- Batsto Village, in Burlington County, a ghost town later transformed into an outdoor museum
- Ong's Hat, in Burlington County
- Whitesbog Village, in Burlington and Ocean counties

== Cape May County ==
- South Cape May, in Cape May County

== Cumberland County ==
- Sea Breeze in Cumberland County

== Middlesex County ==
- Raritan Landing, in Middlesex County

== Ocean County ==
- Double Trouble, in Ocean County
- Island Beach, in Ocean County
- Whitesbog Village, in Burlington and Ocean counties

== Sussex County ==
- Walpack Center, in the Delaware Water Gap National Recreation Area in Sussex County

== Union County ==
- Feltville Historic District, in Union County

== Warren County ==
- Millbrook Village, in the Delaware Water Gap National Recreation Area in Warren County
