= Association of New Jersey Chiropractors =

American online directory

The Association of New Jersey Chiropractors online directory was created to help users make informed decisions about chiropractic care in New Jersey. It lists over 2000 chiropractors in the state of New Jersey for easy reference. The directory also contains several general articles about chiropractic, links to public health initiatives such as the Straighten Up New Jersey campaign, offers a monthly chiropractic newsletter, as well as lists the licensing requirements for New Jersey chiropractors.

== History ==
The McClave Act was passed in 1939, and established uniform license requirements for anyone in New Jersey wishing to practice the healing arts. In 1953 the law was updated and chiropractors were then allowed to apply for licensure before an examining board consisting mostly of medical doctors and a single chiropractor.

Over the next 30 years, New Jersey licensure laws continued to evolve with increasing educational and training requirements for chiropractors that were more in step with the national accreditation given to chiropractic colleges.

The passage of the Chiropractic Board Act in 1989 instituted the New Jersey Board of Chiropractic Examiners, an oversight board for regulating all practicing chiropractors in New Jersey. The Board was created within the Division of Consumer Affairs and regulates the chiropractic profession.

== Chiropractic Examiners ==
The New Jersey Board of Chiropractic Examiners consists of eleven members who reside in New Jersey. One member represents the New Jersey State Executive, two members are laypersons representing the public and the remaining eight members are licensed chiropractors who have actively practiced chiropractic in New Jersey for at least five years preceding their appointment to the Board.

== Licensing requirements ==
Applicants seeking to obtain a license to practice chiropractic in the State of New Jersey must be graduates of an accredited chiropractic college, successfully completing four years of study, consisting of 3,600 to 4,400 class hours of not less than 45 minutes each.

To be eligible for licensure as a chiropractor in New Jersey, an applicant shall:

1. Be at least 18 years of age
2. Have successfully completed high-school or its equivalent
3. Be of good moral character as demonstrated on the application
4. Completed two years of study in an accredited college or university with at least one and one-half of the two years of study prior to commencing study in a chiropractic college or university within a course of study which meets the requirements set forth in New Jersey S.A. 45:9-4 1 .5.
5. Graduated from a chiropractic college or university that meets the requirements set forth in New Jersey S.A. 45:9-4 1 .5 during the applicant's entire course of study
6. Have passed the National Board of Chiropractic Examiners Examination pursuant to New Jersey A.C. 13:44E-2.13
7. Have passed the New Jersey Chiropractic Jurisprudence Examination.
