= List of New Jersey area codes =

Numbering plan areas and area codes of New Jersey

The U.S. state of New Jersey is divided into six distinct geographic numbering plan areas (NPAs) in the North American Numbering Plan (NANP), which are served by a total of ten area codes. All but two of the numbering plan areas are overlay complexes with two area codes each.

| Area code | Installation year | Parent NPA | Overlay | Numbering plan area |
|---|---|---|---|---|
| 201 | 1947 | – | 201/551 | Northeastern New Jersey, primarily Bergen County and Hudson County |
| 551 | 2001 | 201 | 201/551 | Northeastern New Jersey, primarily Bergen County and Hudson County |
| 609 | 1956 | 201 | 609/640 | Trenton, Lawrenceville, Princeton, Medford, Atlantic City, Barnegat, Wildwood, Ocean City, Burlington, Cape May |
| 640 | 2018 | 609 | 609/640 | Trenton, Lawrenceville, Princeton, Medford, Atlantic City, Barnegat, Wildwood, Ocean City, Burlington, Cape May |
| 732 | 1997 | 908 | 732/848 | Toms River, Edison, New Brunswick, Freehold, Red Bank, Woodbridge, Perth Amboy, Carteret |
| 848 | 2001 | 732 | 732/848 | Toms River, Edison, New Brunswick, Freehold, Red Bank, Woodbridge, Perth Amboy, Carteret |
| 856 | 1999 | 609 | – | Camden, Cherry Hill, Glassboro, Vineland, Salem, Marlton, Clayton, Monroeville |
| 973 | 1997 | 201 | 862/973 | Essex County, Morris County, Passaic County, Sussex County, and small portions of Bergen and Hudson counties. |
| 862 | 2001 | 973 | 862/973 | Essex County, Morris County, Passaic County, Sussex County, and small portions of Bergen and Hudson counties. |
| 908 | 1991 | 201 | – | Elizabeth and Union County, Somerset County, Warren County, Hunterdon County, and parts of southern and western Morris County. |

In 1947, when the American Telephone and Telegraph Company (AT&T) devised the first continental telephone numbering plan, the entire state was a single numbering plan area, with area code 201, the first area code of the NANP.

New Jersey numbering plan areas as shown in the July 1963 NJ Bell telephone directory, when the use of the area code became mandatory.

In 1956, the southern half of New Jersey, with the state capital and the extended Philadelphia (PA) suburbs, was assigned area code 609, with a class-4 toll office closer to the corresponding toll traffic. This separated the two population centers (Philadelphia suburbs, and New York City suburbs) into distinct call routing systems for out-of-state long-distance calls. However. until July 1963, New Jersey callers could dial any telephone in the state with seven-digit dialing, without using the area code. In July 1963 central office code protection was lifted and the use of the area code was mandatory when dialing out of the caller's numbering plan area.

== See also ==
- List of North American Numbering Plan area codes
