= New Jersey Surcharge =

New Jersey Surcharge Program
Traffic penalty system overview
- Formed: 1983
- Jurisdiction: State of New Jersey
- Headquarters: New Jersey Motor Vehicle Commission
- Traffic penalty system executive: Director of NJ MVC
- Parent department: New Jersey Department of Transportation
- Website: nj.gov/mvc

New Jersey Surcharge is a program that the State of New Jersey uses for charging additional fees through the Department of Motor Vehicles that are generally two to three times the amount of the fine for a traffic violation.

The program was originally created to help subsidize insurance bonds for drivers who could not afford insurance, but the revenue now mostly goes to the state's discretionary general fund.

New Jersey is the only state in the US with this type of surcharge program. In the last few years, the state has charged drivers $583 million in surcharge fees, but the majority of those charged could not afford to pay the fines and had their driving privileges suspended because of their inability to pay.

The legislature acknowledged that the program created a vicious cycle as many of those who fell behind on payment lost their license and were unable to get to work, making it even less likely that they would ever regain their license or escape the debt. Even those who filed for bankruptcy found themselves unable to escape the fines and penalties created from the surcharge program.
