= New Jersey Music Hall of Fame =

Music museum in Asbury Park, New Jersey

Coordinates: 40.8240°N 74.0736°W

The New Jersey Music Hall of Fame is a museum and hall of fame in Asbury Park, New Jersey. The museum documents the musical heritage of New Jersey, covering artists such as Count Basie, Frank Sinatra, and Bruce Springsteen. The museum also covers New Jersey's role in musical technology, such as the invention of the record player in 1877 by Thomas Edison and the invention of the solid-body guitar by Les Paul.

== See also ==
- List of music museums
