= New Jersey Youth Theatre =

Former American charitable organization

Coordinates: 40°38′34″N 74°20′40.71″W

New Jersey Youth Theatre (NJYT) was a 501(c)3 charitable organization with a business office in Westfield, NJ and Performing Arts School in Roselle Park, NJ. Founded in 1991 by Cynthia Meryl and Theodore J. “Ted” Agress, New Jersey Youth Theatre produced more than 36 main-stage productions. The company closed its doors in 2018 with the founders’ retirement.

== History ==
NJYT was founded in 1991 by husband and wife duo Theodore J. Agress and Cynthia Meryl - both veterans of stage and television, as Westfield Young Artists Cooperative Theatre (WYACT). In 2006, the company changed its name to New Jersey Youth Theatre to more accurately reflect the geographical area it serves.

The theatre organization has performed::

NJYT Performances
Midnight Madness (2017)
Into the Woods (2016)
Cabaret (2015)
Oklahoma! (2014)
West Side Story (2013)
Smokey Joe's Cafe (2012)
Kiss Me, Kate (2011)
Rent (2010)
Sweeney Todd (2009)
1776 (2008)
Midnight Madness (2008)
Carousel (2007)
Ragtime (2006)
Guys and Dolls (2005)
Anything Goes (2004)
West Side Story (2003)
South Pacific (2002)
Once On This Island (2001)
Brigadoon (2000)
Oliver! (1999)
Carousel (1998)
