= Gateway Park (New Jersey) =

Park in Camden and Pennsauken Township, New Jersey

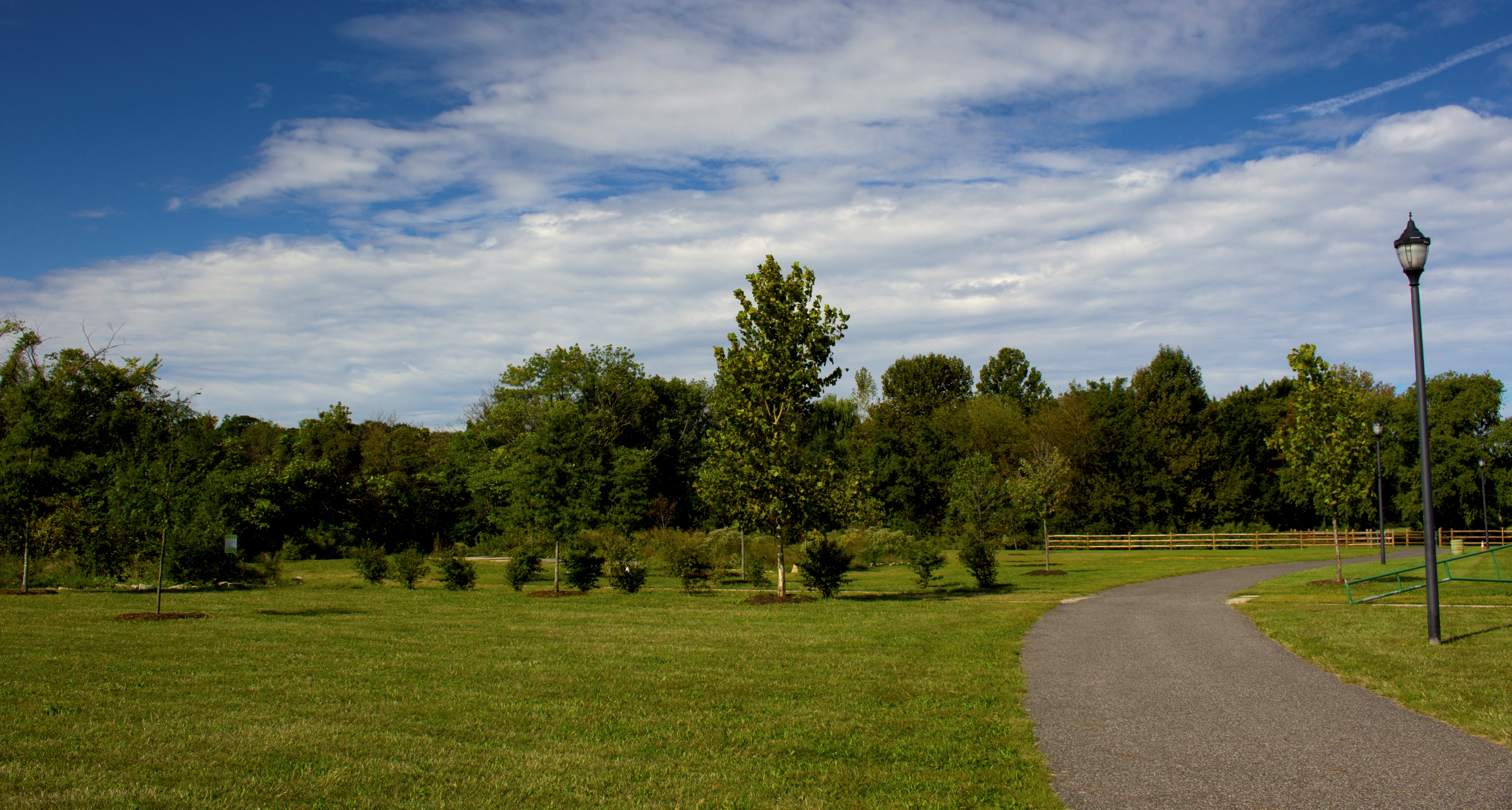
- Gateway Park walking path
- Interactive map of Gateway Park
- Type: Urban park
- Nearest city: Camden and Pennsauken, NJ
- Coordinates: 39.93564°N 75.08774°W
- Area: 25 acres (10 ha)
- Opened: March 11, 2019
- Owner: Camden County Municipal Utilities Authority (CCMUA)
- Manager: New Jersey Conservation Foundation & CCMUA
- Open: Year round
- Water: Cooper River
- Website: Official website

Gateway Park is a 25-acre (10 ha) riverfront park in Camden and Pennsauken Township, New Jersey that runs along a half mile section of the Cooper River. It consists of a one-mile paved multi use trail for walking and casual biking. Future plans call for creation of a boat launch for paddled vessels such as canoes and kayaks.

The trail is connected with the regional Circuit Trails initiative, a network of trails across multiple parks in the Greater Philadelphia region that connect southern New Jersey to Pennsylvania. The park is a member of Alliance for Watershed Education of the Delaware River which actively promotes the understanding and value of the Delaware River watershed.

This is an urban park that is part of the revitalization of the Camden waterfront. The tract was previously filled with derelict buildings and seedy establishments. Gateway Park is one of a number of parks in the Camden area that are contributing to the revitalization of the Camden waterfront which also includes the recently opened Cramer Hill Preserve, Petty's Island (Pennsauken)nature preserve and Coopers Poynt Waterfront park among others.

Gateway Park is owned by Camden County Municipal Utilities Authority (CCMUA) and is managed by New Jersey Conservation Foundation.

== History ==
The area for Gateway Park was previously populated with gas stations, seedy bars, motels and illicit activity. In March 1999, New Jersey Governor Christine Todd Whitman announced the Gateway Project to clean up the blighted area and present a more appealing gateway to Camden and New Jersey. This was in preparation for the 2000 republican national convention in Philadelphia and the anticipated flux of visitors who would be traveling past this location to their hotels in the suburbs. The Delaware River Port Authority bought the land and removed the unsightly properties and planted grass and laid down an asphalt walking path.

Although the park was established in 2000, the land remained vacant and closed due to environmental issues for about 11 years before pressure from local advocacy groups resulted in the Delaware River Port Authority cleaning up the area to ready it for the promised public park. Ownership of the land transferred from Delaware River Port Authority to Camden County Municipal Utilities Authority (CCMUA) who in turn partnered with New Jersey Conservation Foundation to manage the park.

Gateway Park opened to the public in March 2019.
