= Safe Corridor =

Project by the New Jersey Department of Transportation

For the concept of safe passage in wartime, see Humanitarian corridor.

The Safe Corridor initiative is part of an effort by the New Jersey Department of Transportation, and departments from other states, to improve the safety of its roads. Roads with accident and fatality rates above the average may have some of their lengths designated as "Safe Corridor" areas. In these areas, traffic fines are doubled.

At the program's inception, there were thirteen roads with Safe Corridors: U.S. Route 1, U.S. Route 9, Route 10, Route 17, U.S. Route 22, Route 23, U.S. Route 30, U.S. Route 40, U.S. Route 46, Route 47, Route 73, U.S. Route 130, and U.S. Route 206.

The Safe Corridors Program is a part of New Jersey's "Safety First" initiative, which combines $20 million in highway improvements over five years with stricter police enforcement, increased fines for unsafe equipment and hazardous driving, and enhanced driver education for all motorists. New Jersey's Safe Corridors Program focuses on improving safety along the State's most crash-prone corridors – nearly 130 miles (210 km) of state roadway.
