= List of counties in New Jersey =

Counties of New Jersey
- A clickable New Jersey county map Clickable map of New Jersey counties
- Location: New Jersey
- Number: 21
- Populations: 66,280 (Salem) – 977,026 (Bergen)
- Areas: 47 square miles (120 km^{2}) (Hudson) – 805 square miles (2,080 km^{2}) (Burlington)
- Government: County government
- Subdivisions: Boroughs, cities, towns, townships, and villages

There are 21 counties in the U.S. state of New Jersey. These counties together contain 564 municipalities, or administrative entities composed of clearly defined territory; 253 boroughs, 52 cities, 15 towns, 240 townships, and 4 villages. In New Jersey, a county is a local level of government between the state and municipalities. County government in New Jersey includes a Board of County Commissioners, sheriff, clerk, and surrogate (responsible for uncontested and routine probate), all of which are elected positions. Counties organized under the Optional County Charter Law may also have an elected county executive. Counties traditionally perform state-mandated duties such as the maintenance of jails, parks, and certain roads. The site of a county's administration and courts is called the county seat.

== History ==
New Jersey was governed by two groups of proprietors as two distinct provinces, East Jersey and West Jersey, between 1674 and 1702. New Jersey's first counties were created as administrative districts within each province, with East Jersey split in 1675 into Bergen, Essex, Middlesex and Monmouth counties, while West Jersey's initial counties of Burlington and Salem date to 1681. The most recent county created in New Jersey is Union County, created in 1857 and named after the union of the United States when the Civil War was imminent. New Jersey's county names derive from several sources, though most of its counties are named after place names in England and prominent leaders in the colonial and revolutionary periods. Bergen County is the most populous county—as of the 2020 Census—with 955,732 people, while Salem County is the least populous with 64,837 people.

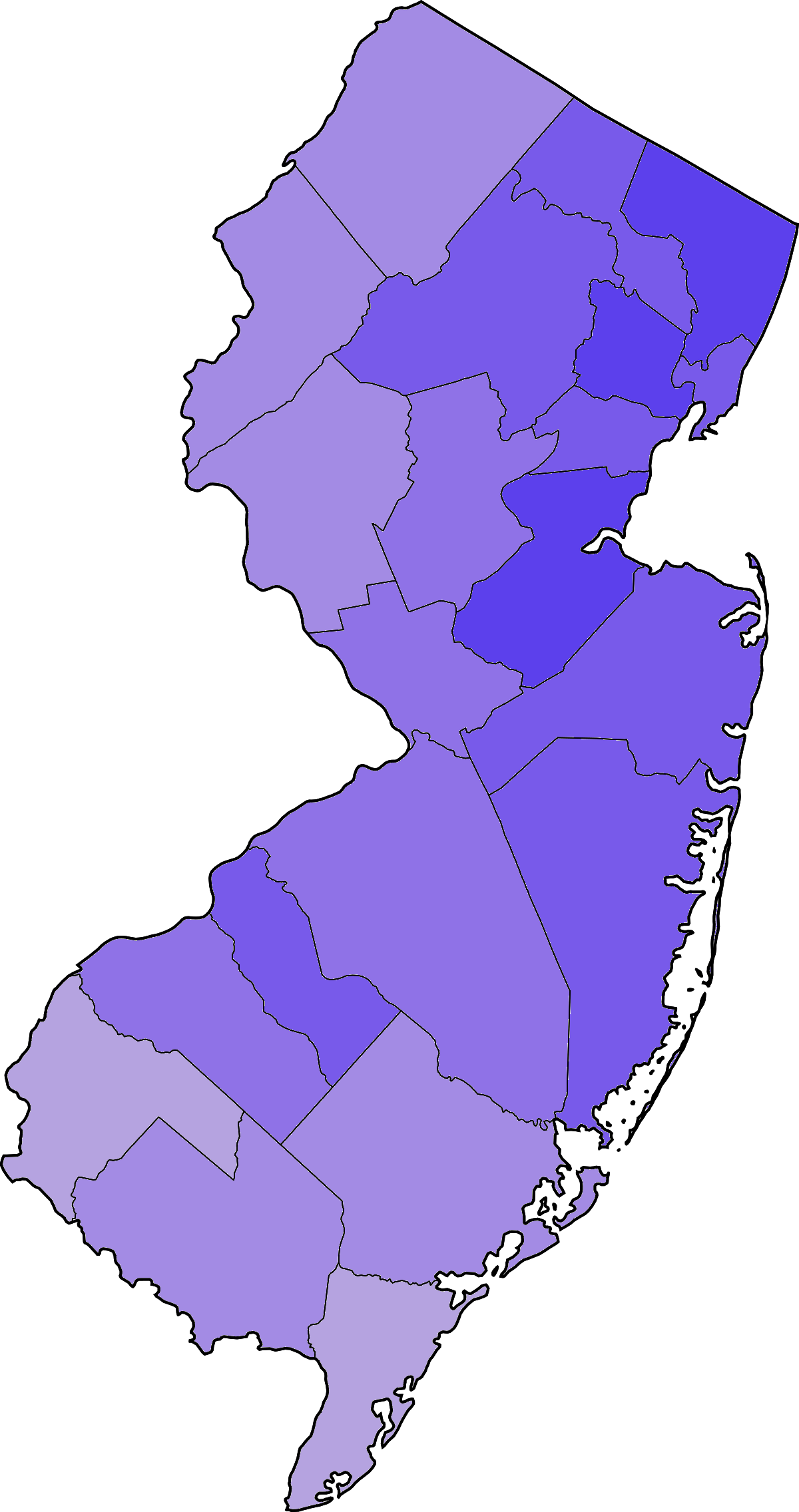
New Jersey counties by population as of 2020 with darker colors indicating a higher population

== New Jersey legislature representation ==
Until the 1960s, the New Jersey Senate had 21 representatives, one from each county regardless of population. In the wake of the 1964 decision by the Supreme Court of the United States in Reynolds v. Sims, establishing the one man, one vote principle that state legislative districts must be approximately equal in size, David Friedland filed suit in New Jersey Supreme Court on behalf of two union leaders, challenging a system under which each county was represented by a single member in the New Jersey Senate. The court ruled unanimously that the existing system was unconstitutional, ordered that interim measures be established by statute for the 1965 legislative elections, and ordered that the needed constitutional changes to restructure the New Jersey Legislature to be in compliance with "one man, one vote" requirements be in place before elections took place in 1967. The senate unilaterally—by internal rule, not by statute—enacted a proposal whereby each senator's vote would be weighted based on the population of the county represented, under which Cape May County's senator would receive one vote while the senator from Essex County would receive 19.1 votes, in direct relation to the ratio of residents between counties. The Supreme Court ruled unanimously that it was unconstitutional for the senate to adopt a weighted voting system unilaterally. In 1966, the constitution was amended to establish 40 districts statewide, each represented by one senator and two assembly members, without relation to county boundaries.

== FIPS code ==
The Federal Information Processing Standard (FIPS) code, used by the United States government to uniquely identify counties, is provided with each entry. FIPS codes are five-digit numbers; for New Jersey the codes start with 34 and are completed with the three-digit county code. The FIPS code for each county in the table links to census data for that county.

== List of counties ==
County	FIPS code	County seat	Largest City	Est.	Formed from	Named for	Density (per mi^{2})	Pop.	Area	Map
Atlantic County	001	Mays Landing	Egg Harbor Township 47,842	February 7, 1837	Gloucester County	The Atlantic Ocean, which forms the county's eastern border	496.71	278,657	561 sq mi (1,453 km^{2})	A county in the southeast part of the state. It is medium in size.
Bergen County	003	Hackensack	Hackensack 46,030	March 7, 1683	One of four original counties created in East Jersey	Bergen, New Netherland settlement	4,175.32	977,026	234 sq mi (606 km^{2})	A county in the northeast part of the state. It is small.
Burlington County	005	Mount Holly	Evesham Township 46,826	May 17, 1694	One of two original counties created in West Jersey	The old ancient name for an inland market near Bridlington, England	598.06	481,439	805 sq mi (2,085 km^{2})	A county in the southern part of the state. It gets wider as it goes northeast. It is one of the largest counties.
Camden County	007	Camden	Cherry Hill 74,553	March 13, 1844	Gloucester County	Charles Pratt, 1st Earl Camden (1714–1794), an English supporter of the colonists during the American Revolution	2,413.51	535,799	222 sq mi (575 km^{2})	A county in the southwest part of the state. It is very small.
Cape May County	009	Cape May Court House	Lower Township 22,057	November 12, 1692	Burlington County	Cape May, named in turn for the 17th-century Dutch explorer Cornelius Jacobsen Mey, who explored and surveyed the Delaware Bay to the south of the county	366.24	93,390	255 sq mi (660 km^{2})	A county the makes up the southern tip of the state. It is one of the smallest.
Cumberland County	011	Bridgeton	Vineland 60,780	January 19, 1748	Salem County	Prince William, Duke of Cumberland (1721–1765), second son of George II of Great Britain and military victor at the Battle of Culloden in 1746	321.37	157,148	489 sq mi (1,267 km^{2})	A county in the southern part of the state, west of the tip. It is averagely sized.
Essex County	013	Newark	Newark 311,549	March 7, 1683	One of four original counties created in East Jersey	The county of Essex in England	7,114.12	896,379	126 sq mi (326 km^{2})	A county in the northeast part of the state. It is one of the smallest.
Gloucester County	015	Woodbury	Washington Township 48,677	May 28, 1686	Burlington County	The city of Gloucester, England	961.96	312,638	325 sq mi (842 km^{2})	A county in the southwest part of the state. It is averagely sized.
Hudson County	017	Jersey City	Jersey City 292,449	February 22, 1840	Bergen County	The English explorer Henry Hudson (d. 1611), who explored portions of New Jersey's coastline	15,639.00	735,033	47 sq mi (122 km^{2})	A county in the northeast part of the state. It is the smallest county.
Hunterdon County	019	Flemington	Raritan Township 23,447	March 11, 1714	Burlington County	Robert Hunter (1664–1734), the Colonial Governor of New Jersey from 1710 to 1720	306.47	131,781	430 sq mi (1,114 km^{2})	A county in the west part of the state, just north of the divide between north and south. It is averagely sized.
Mercer County	021	Trenton	Hamilton Township 92,297	February 22, 1838	Burlington, Hunterdon, Middlesex, and Somerset counties	The Continental Army General Hugh Mercer (1726–1777), who died at the Battle of Princeton	1,766.77	399,289	226 sq mi (585 km^{2})	A county in the western part of the state, just above an indentation. It is small compared to its neighbors.
Middlesex County	023	New Brunswick	Edison 107,588	March 7, 1683	One of four original counties created in East Jersey	The historic county of Middlesex in England	2,840.31	883,335	311 sq mi (805 km^{2})	A county in the northern part of the state. It is averagely sized.
Monmouth County	025	Freehold Borough	Middletown Township 67,106	March 7, 1683	One of four original counties created in East Jersey	The historic County of Monmouth in Great Britain	1,379.31	651,035	472 sq mi (1,222 km^{2})	A county in the central-western part of the state. It is averagely sized and gets skinnier in the west.
Morris County	027	Morristown	Parsippany-Troy Hills 56,162	March 15, 1739	Hunterdon County	Colonel Lewis Morris (1671–1746), colonial governor of New Jersey at the time of the county's formation	1,117.81	524,251	469 sq mi (1,215 km^{2})	A county in the northern part of the state, landlocked by other counties. It is well-sized.
Ocean County	029	Toms River	Lakewood Township 135,158	February 15, 1850	Monmouth and Burlington counties	The Atlantic Ocean, which forms the eastern border of New Jersey	736.33	673,746	915 sq mi (2,370 km^{2})	A county in the southeast part of the state. It is large and gets skinnier in the south.
Passaic County	031	Paterson	Paterson 159,732	February 7, 1837	Bergen and Essex counties	Pasaeck, a Lenape word meaning "valley"	2,873.64	531,624	185 sq mi (479 km^{2})	A county in the north-central part of the state. It is small, and has two wide parts with a skinny area between them.
Salem County	033	Salem	Pennsville Township 12,684	May 17, 1694	One of two original counties created in West Jersey	Salem, Biblical town, which takes its name from the Hebrew word for "peace."	196.09	66,280	338 sq mi (875 km^{2})	A county in the southwest part of the state. It is averagely sized.
Somerset County	035	Somerville	Franklin Township 68,364	May 14, 1688	Middlesex County	The county of Somerset in England	1,168.81	356,486	305 sq mi (790 km^{2})	A county landlocked by other counties in the northern part of the state. It is small.
Sussex County	037	Newton	Vernon Township 22,358	June 8, 1753	Morris County	The county of Sussex in England	284.19	148,063	521 sq mi (1,349 km^{2})	A county in the northwest corner of the state. It is larger than most surrounding counties.
Union County	039	Elizabeth	Elizabeth 137,298	March 19, 1857	Essex County	The union of the United States, which was being threatened by the dispute over slavery	5,843.33	601,863	103 sq mi (267 km^{2})	A county in the northeast part of the state, on an indentation. It is one of the smallest counties.
Warren County	041	Belvidere	Phillipsburg 15,249	November 20, 1824	Sussex County	The American Revolutionary War General Joseph Warren (1741–1775), killed at the Battle of Bunker Hill	315.51	112,953	358 sq mi (927 km^{2})	A county in the northwest part of the state. It is averagely sized.

== Racial / Ethnic Profile of counties in New Jersey (2020 Census) ==
Racial / Ethnic Profile of counties in New Jersey (2020 Census)
Following is a table of counties in New Jersey by race/ethnicity. The majority racial/ethnic group is coded per the key below.

Majority minority with no dominant group
Majority White
Majority Black
Majority Hispanic
Majority Asian
Majority Native American

Racial and ethnic composition of counties in New Jersey (2020 Census) (NH = Non-Hispanic) Note: the US Census treats Hispanic/Latino as an ethnic category. This table excludes Latinos from the racial categories and assigns them to a separate category. Hispanics/Latinos may be of any race.
County	Location of County	Total Population	White alone (NH)	%	Black or African American alone (NH)	%	Native American or Alaska Native alone (NH)	%	Asian alone (NH)	%	Pacific Islander alone (NH)	%	Other race alone (NH)	%	Mixed race or Multiracial (NH)	%	Hispanic or Latino (any race)	%
Atlantic		274,534	148,858	54.22%	39,022	14.21%	357	0.13%	21,563	7.85%	82	0.03%	1,343	0.49%	9,596	3.50%	53,713	19.57%
Bergen		955,732	511,919	53.56%	49,909	5.22%	811	0.08%	157,500	16.48%	130	0.01%	6,464	0.68%	24,316	2.54%	204,683	21.42%
Burlington		461,860	294,510	63.77%	74,807	16.20%	609	0.13%	25,980	5.63%	265	0.06%	3,235	0.70%	22,067	4.78%	40,387	8.74%
Camden		523,485	279,274	53.35%	95,135	18.17%	692	0.13%	32,328	6.18%	99	0.02%	2,576	0.49%	18,126	3.46%	95,255	18.20%
Cape May		95,263	80,040	84.02%	3,305	3.47%	99	0.10%	893	0.94%	22	0.02%	319	0.33%	3,120	3.28%	7,465	7.84%
Cumberland		154,152	65,808	42.69%	26,375	17.11%	905	0.59%	2,051	1.33%	12	0.01%	595	0.39%	5,352	3.47%	53,054	34.42%
Essex		863,728	235,125	27.22%	324,081	37.52%	1,238	0.14%	46,957	5.44%	169	0.02%	12,078	1.40%	33,727	3.90%	210,353	24.35%
Gloucester		302,294	225,355	74.55%	31,517	10.43%	331	0.11%	9,475	3.13%	74	0.02%	1,103	0.36%	12,304	4.07%	22,135	7.32%
Hudson		724,854	206,530	28.49%	71,385	9.85%	1,069	0.15%	123,424	17.03%	233	0.03%	9,210	1.27%	19,984	2.76%	293,019	40.42%
Hunterdon		128,947	104,667	81.17%	3,030	2.35%	92	0.07%	5,677	4.40%	8	0.01%	535	0.41%	4,009	3.11%	10,929	8.48%
Mercer		387,340	168,580	43.52%	72,364	18.68%	427	0.11%	48,330	12.48%	106	0.03%	1,879	0.49%	11,477	2.96%	84,177	21.73%
Middlesex		863,162	333,158	38.60%	78,719	9.12%	1,183	0.14%	227,973	26.41%	192	0.02%	7,053	0.82%	21,197	2.46%	193,687	22.44%
Monmouth		643,615	460,825	71.60%	39,178	6.09%	482	0.07%	36,008	5.59%	97	0.02%	4,566	0.71%	21,729	3.38%	80,730	12.54%
Morris		509,285	341,175	66.99%	15,586	3.06%	373	0.07%	57,700	11.33%	93	0.02%	2,337	0.46%	15,360	3.02%	76,661	15.05%
Ocean		637,229	520,578	81.69%	17,649	2.77%	523	0.08%	11,339	1.78%	111	0.02%	3,899	0.61%	16,801	2.64%	66,329	10.41%
Passaic		524,118	203,542	38.84%	51,859	9.89%	688	0.13%	30,209	5.76%	52	0.01%	3,514	0.67%	10,224	1.95%	224,030	42.74%
Salem		64,837	45,279	69.84%	9,049	13.96%	182	0.28%	649	1.00%	13	0.02%	277	0.43%	2,853	4.40%	6,535	10.08%
Somerset		345,361	177,411	51.37%	30,480	8.83%	306	0.09%	67,098	19.43%	69	0.02%	2,015	0.58%	10,603	3.07%	57,379	16.61%
Sussex		144,221	118,247	81.99%	2,858	1.98%	191	0.13%	2,918	2.02%	11	0.01%	666	0.46%	5,020	3.48%	14,310	9.92%
Union		575,345	211,245	36.72%	112,261	19.51%	552	0.10%	31,963	5.56%	78	0.01%	6,190	1.08%	17,537	3.05%	195,519	33.98%
Warren		109,632	84,255	76.85%	5,573	5.08%	96	0.09%	2,886	2.63%	28	0.03%	500	0.46%	4,069	3.71%	12,225	11.15%

== See also ==
- List of townships in New Jersey
- County courthouses in New Jersey
- List of United States counties and county equivalents
- Metropolitan statistical areas of New Jersey—each New Jersey county is included in a metropolitan statistical area as defined by the federal Office of Management and Budget
