= New Jersey Detective Agency =

State agency of New Jersey, United States

The New Jersey Detective Agency, also known as the NJDA, is a body politic created by the New Jersey Legislature in 1871 conferring statewide police powers on its officers. The Agency functions as the administrative body of the New Jersey State Detectives.
