= New Jersey Gladiators SC =

- Full name: New Jersey Gladiators SC
- Nickname: Gladiators
- Founded: 2012 (as GS Croatia FC)
- Ground: Pascack Valley High School
- Capacity: 3,000
- Chairman: Marijan Pavisic
- League: American Soccer League (2014)
- Website: http://www.njgladiatorsoccer.com
Home colors	Away colors

New Jersey Gladiators are a professional soccer team based in the Newark, New Jersey area. Originally formed in 2012 as Garden State Croatia FC the club competed in the amateur North Jersey Soccer League (NJSL). The club changed its name in February 2014 with the expansion of the club.

The NJ Gladiators Reserves will continue to compete in the North Jersey Soccer League.

== History (2012–2014) ==
Competing in the NJSL, GS Croatia FC earned promotion after their first season in the Premier New Jersey Division finishing with a record of 9–0–4 in 2012–13. In the club's first campaign in the Premier World Division GSCFC finished ninth of 12 clubs going 5–0–13.

(2015–16) Gladiators defeat Stallions 2–0 {nj cup}
