= New Jersey Lightning =

- Founded: 2007
- League: EBA 2007-present
- Team history: New Jersey Lightning; 2007-present
- Based in: Randolph, New Jersey
- Arena: County College of Morris
- Colors: Navy, Red, Silver
- Owner: Champion Sports and Entertainment
- Championships: 0

The New Jersey Lightning are a professional basketball team based in Randolph, New Jersey, in the United States. The Lightning is a member of the Eastern Basketball Alliance. The Lightning current home venue is County College of Morris.

== Former players ==
Former Players
Name	Position	Height
Edward Allen	Guard	6'5"
Maurice Boatwright	Guard	6'2"
Brian Davison	Forward	6'5"
Bashir Grimes	Guard	6'4"
Raphael Madera	Center	6'11"
Bryan Henderson	Forward	6'6"
Jonathan Birriel	Forward	6'6"
Taisuke Hayama	Guard	6'0"
Tony Murphy	Guard	6'4"
Keimon Thompson	Forward	6'7"
Lukasz Zienko	Forward	6'4"
Jeff Vincent	Guard	6'2"
Lance Beverette	Forward	6'6"
Dion Johnson	Forward	6'4"

== New Jersey Lightning: EBA History ==
The New Jersey Lightning have been members of the Eastern Basketball Association since 2007. The franchise is owned by Champion Sports and Entertainment. The EBA first organized in 1946, the Eastern Basketball Association (EBA) was an East Coast-based league with teams coming from Pennsylvania and the surrounding states. It was eventually supplanted by the Easter Basketball League (EBL).

Throughout the years, a group of adventurous basketballers in the early 1990s created the Atlantic Basketball Association (ABA) which had a strong commitment from Pennsylvania.

Still another group played its inaugural 1996/97 season as the Eastern Basketball Alliance (EBA). This league played the season with seven teams. In the fall of 1997, the EBA became organized and incorporated, and expanded to ten franchises, representing five different states.

The 1998 season featured teams located in Lancaster, PA; York, PA; Reading, PA; Harrisburg, PA; Wilkes-Barre, PA; Mercer County, NJ; Springfield, MA; Brooklyn, NY; Hudson Valley, NY; and New Haven, CT. The '98 season also marked the first time that the EBA elected a commissioner, in the person of Julius McCoy, and set up a league office.

In 1999, four EBA teams and two ABA teams joined and played the season under the banner of UBA (United Basketball Alliance). This continued in 2000 and 2001 with nine teams participating.

2002 saw the league return to its historic and incorporated roots of the Eastern Basketball Alliance, where it flourishes today. Most noteworthy is the high-caliber of play, and the strength of individual franchises and of the league. Organizationally, the EBA has never been stronger, which, combined with the solid group of existing franchises, makes the EBA one of the fastest growing professional leagues in the country.
