= New Jersey: The Movie =

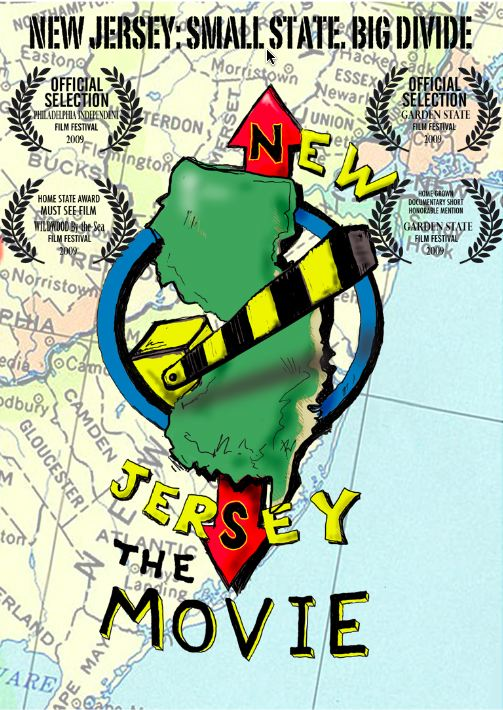
- Theatrical release poster.
- Directed by: Steve Chernoski
- Written by: Steve Chernoski
- Produced by: Alena Kruchkova
- Starring: Steve Chernoski
- Edited by: Andrei Litvinov
- Release date: 2009
- Country: United States
- Language: English
- Budget: $25,000

New Jersey: The Movie is a 2009 American documentary film written and directed by Steve Chernoski. The film examines the cultural divide that exists in the state of New Jersey between North and South.

It was released on DVD in February 2010.

The film was produced by Alena Kruchkova and edited by Andrei Litvinov.

== See also ==
- Central Jersey
