= Geography of New Jersey =

Location of New Jersey in the world

Location of New Jersey in the U.S.A.

New Jersey is a U.S. state that lies on the north eastern edge of the North American continent. It shares a land border with the state of New York along the north, ratified by both states after the New York – New Jersey Line War, which is its only straight line border.

The Atlantic Ocean is east of the state, and many of the state's famed beaches are located along the Jersey Shore region of Ocean, Monmouth, Atlantic and Cape May Counties. New Jersey is separated from New York by the Hudson River, which separates it from the boroughs of The Bronx and Manhattan. The Kill van Kull and Arthur Kill tidal straits separate the state from Staten Island. Liberty Island is an exclave of the State of New York in New Jersey waters in Upper New York Bay. Ellis Island, also in the Upper Bay, and Shooters Island, in Newark Bay, each have sections belonging to either of the two states. Though Liberty Island, Shooters Island and Ellis Island all geographically belong to New Jersey, it is a part of New York due to symbolism, tourism and economic reasons.

On its west, New Jersey is flanked by the Delaware River that forms its border with the Commonwealth of Pennsylvania and Delaware Bay which separates New Jersey from the state of Delaware. However, due to a fluke in a colonial land grant for the city of New Castle, Delaware (called The Twelve-Mile Circle), there is a small amount of Delaware territory in contiguous New Jersey, west of Pennsville Township. Finns Point, piers at Penns Grove, New Jersey and Pennsville, and Artificial Island, the tip of a small peninsula at Lower Alloways Creek are connected to Salem County. A coal pier in Logan Township also extends into the river. New Jersey's natural regions were formed by glaciers.

== Area ==
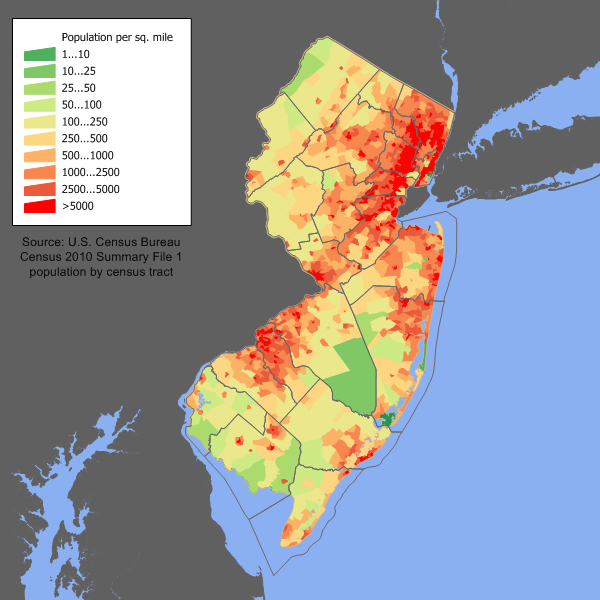
New Jersey is the most densely populated state in the U.S.

The state of New Jersey is ranked as the fourth smallest state in the United States of America. Its total area of the state is 8,729 square miles (22,610 km^{2}), of which 1,304 square miles (3,380 km^{2}) is water, and 7,425 square miles (19,230 km^{2}) is land. New Jersey spans 70 miles (110 km) at its widest, and 166 miles (267 km) in length. Much of the state's population live within 50 miles of New York City or Philadelphia due to the size and shape of the state.

New Jersey ranks eleventh in the nation in terms of population with 9,288,994 people, making it the most densely populated state in the United States, with 1,291.9 inhabitants per square mile (498.8/km^{2}). While this may offer the impression that New Jersey is entirely urban or suburban, it is not. Forests cover roughly 45% of New Jersey's land area, or approximately 2.1 million acres (8,500 km^{2}), ranking 31st among the 50 U.S. states and six territories. Large swaths of South Jersey are very rural and occupied by the Pinelands National Reserve, over 1.1 million acres (4,500 km^{2}) in size, located in Atlantic, Burlington, and Ocean Counties. Northwestern New Jersey is also extremely rural due to the mountainous and hilly terrain of the Ridge and Valley area of the Skylands Region region. For example, Walpack Township in Sussex County has a population of 7 and an area of 26 square miles (67 km^{2}), and Washington Township in Burlington County has a population of under 700 while occupying 104.81 square miles (271.46 km^2)

== Political and cultural geography ==
A clickable New Jersey county map

The State of New Jersey is divided into 21 counties, which combined, contain a total of 566 municipalities. New Jersey municipalities have a strong tradition of independent home rule. Rural municipalities tend to lean more conservative, while suburban and urban municipalities lean more liberal, similar to the national trend.

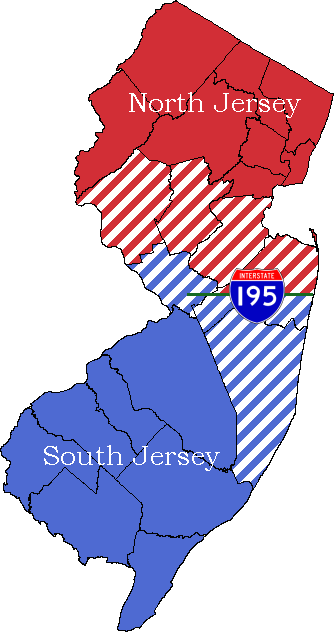
Map of New Jersey with both two-portion and three-portion divide

New Jersey is commonly divided into the regions of North Jersey, Central Jersey, South Jersey and the Jersey Shore. Many residents debate about whether Central Jersey actually exists or not, but this debate was resolved by Governor Phil Murphy's signing of a law that declared Central Jersey to be made up of Middlesex, Mercer, Somerset, and Hunterdon counties.

North Jersey comprises Bergen, Essex, Hudson, Passaic, Morris, Sussex, and Warren Counties, while Central Jersey is made up of Middlesex, Union, Mercer, Somerset, and Hunterdon Counties. South Jersey is composed of Camden, Burlington, Gloucester, Cumberland, and Salem Counties. The Jersey Shore region is typically associated with Ocean, Monmouth, Atlantic, and Cape May Counties.

The New Jersey State Department of Tourism distinguishes six distinct tourist regions: the Gateway, Greater Atlantic City (consisting of all of Atlantic County), the Southern Shore Region, the Delaware River Region, the Shore Region and the Skylands Region.

== Climate ==
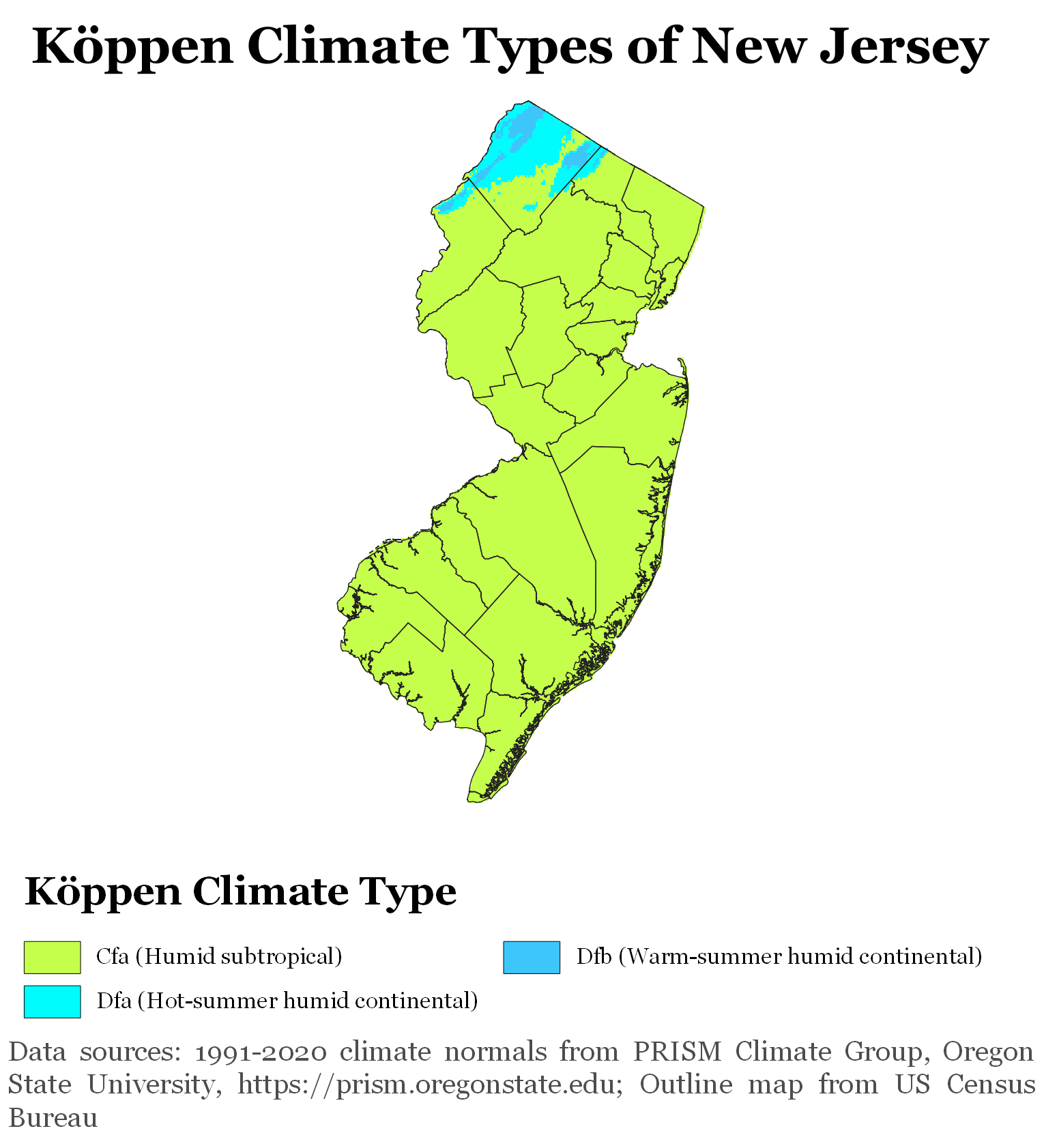
Köppen climate types of New Jersey, using 1991-2020 climate normals.

The climate of New Jersey per the global Köppen classification of the U.S. state of New Jersey is humid subtropical in almost all of New Jersey, including all of South Jersey and Central Jersey, with the vestiges of a humid continental climate remaining only in the northern extreme of North Jersey. The northwestern part of New Jersey is the snowiest due to its higher elevations, which earn it a Dfb classification. During winter, New Jersey can experience Nor'easters, which are snowstorms that affect the Northeastern United States, and Atlantic Canada. However, many would-be snow events in the state end up turning to rain due to warm ocean air being brought in by the storm and also by compressional heating of air from the west as it descends eastward of the Poconos Mountains from Pennsylvania. New Jersey's climate is shaped prominently by its proximity to the Atlantic Ocean, which provides moisture and moderates temperatures. According to climatology research by the U.S. National Oceanic and Atmospheric Administration, New Jersey has been the fastest-warming of all 50 U.S. states by average air temperature over a 100-year period beginning in the early 20th century, related to global warming.

== Features ==
=== Rivers ===
New Jersey is largely delineated by rivers. The lower Delaware forms the state's border with Pennsylvania, and on the northeast side of the state the Hudson separates it from New York.

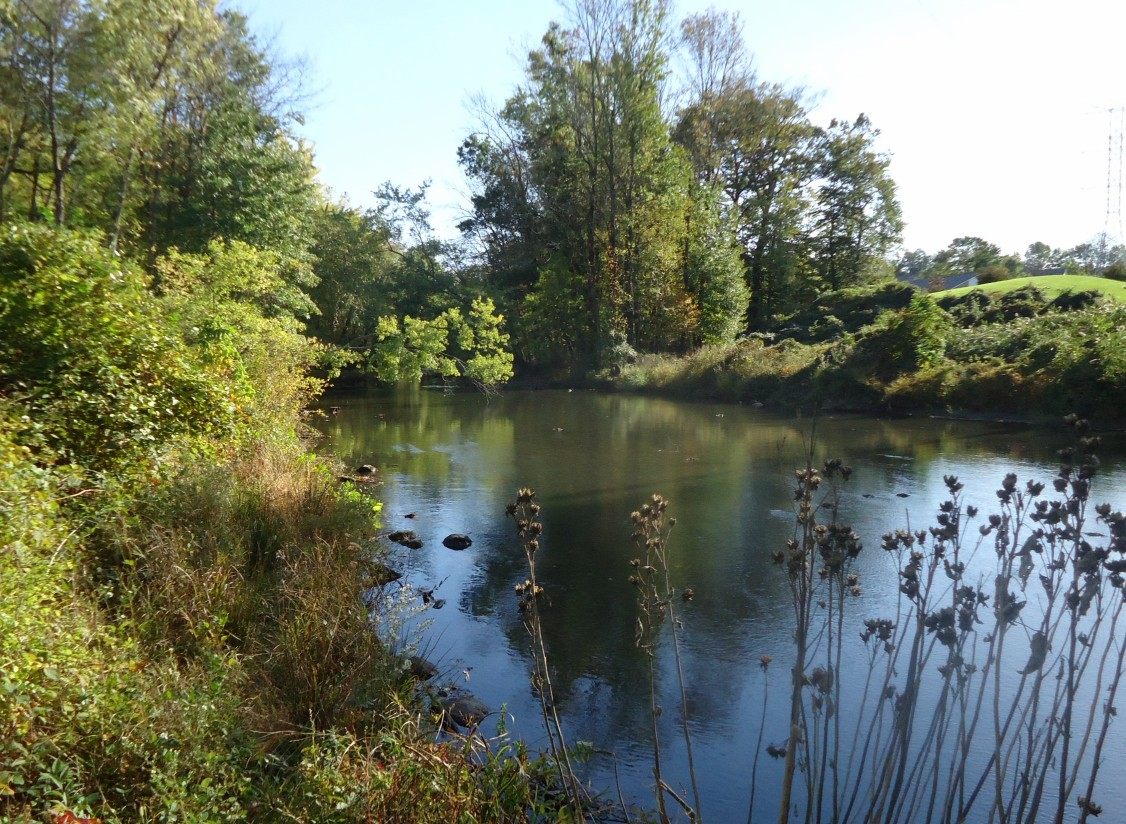
Passaic River between Summit and Chatham Township

New Jersey's longest river located entirely within its borders, the 80-mile (130 km) Passaic, rises in Mendham Township and flows to Newark Bay, serving as a county line along much of that length. Its mouth is adjacent to that of the Hackensack River, which rises in Rockland County, New York. Along with tributaries such as the Pequannock and Ramapo, the combined Passaic/Hackensack watershed covers most of northeastern New Jersey as well as parts of Orange and Rockland counties in New York.

Central Jersey is mostly drained by the Raritan River, whose main stem is formed west of Somerville. From there it flows east to Raritan Bay, just south of Staten Island.

The Musconetcong, New Jersey's longest river that does not drain into the Atlantic directly, flows out of Lake Hopatcong southwest to the Delaware. Along its course it forms the boundary between Warren County on its west and Morris and Hunterdon counties to the east. At Lake Mohawk near Sparta in Sussex County, the Wallkill, the longest river to rise in New Jersey, begins its 88-mile (142 km) journey to Rondout Creek shortly before that stream flows into the Hudson at Kingston, New York.

South Jersey's rivers are generally shorter. The longest in that region, the 51-mile (82 km) Mullica, rises outside Berlin and flows across the Pine Barrens to the Atlantic at Little Egg Harbor.

=== Lakes ===
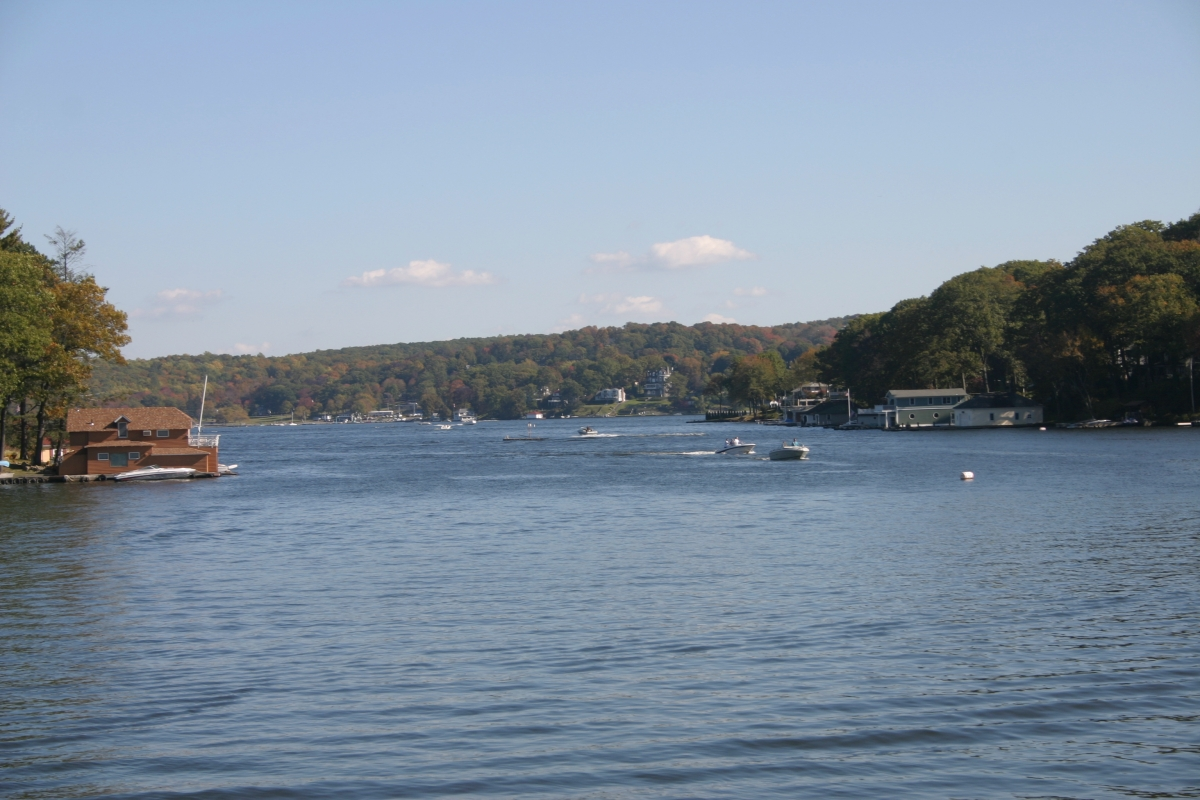
Lake Hopatcong

Most of New Jersey's significant lakes are concentrated in the state's mountainous northwest. The largest lake within the state, 4-square-mile (10 km^{2}) Lake Hopatcong, straddles the Morris-Sussex county line. It has been expanded in the past, like the state's next largest lakes, Round Valley Reservoir and Wanaque Reservoir, both of which supply drinking water and recreational opportunities for many nearby communities. The 7-mile-long (11 km) Greenwood Lake is shared with New York.

Other prominent waterbodies in New Jersey include Sunfish Pond in Warren County, the southernmost glacial tarn along the Appalachian Trail.

=== Mountains ===
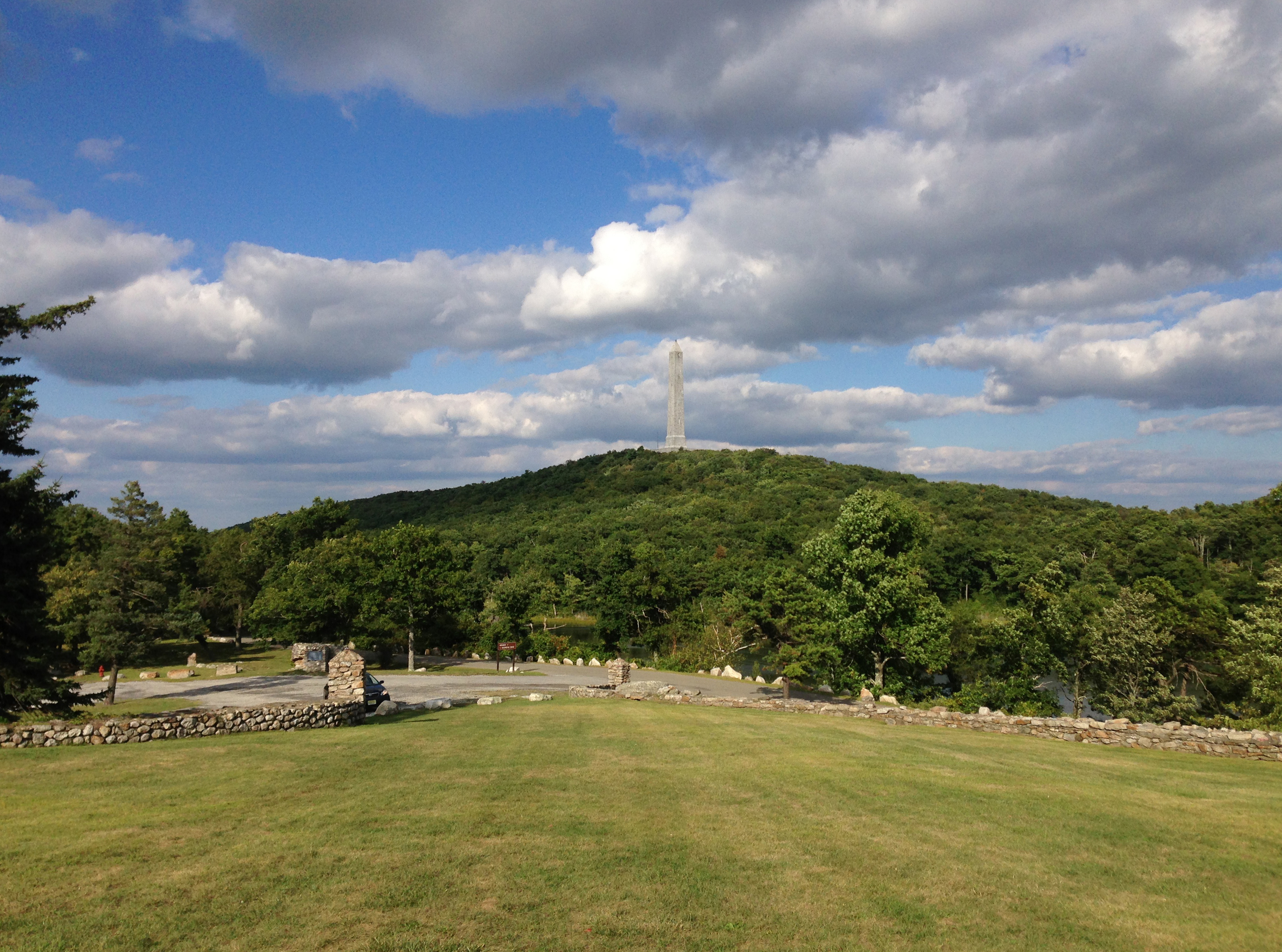
High Point

New Jersey's mountains are also located primarily in the northwest. High Point, the state's highest peak at 1,803 feet (550 m), is in Sussex County near its northern corner. The highest point in South Jersey is Arneys Mount, a small hill in Burlington County's Springfield Township, at approximately 240 feet (73 m).

=== Barrier islands ===
A series of barrier islands run the length of the Jersey Shore. They include Long Beach Island and Absecon Island. Many are popular tourist destinations.

Between the barrier islands and the coast there are many smaller islands, largely uninhabited. New Jersey has no offshore islands, nor any significant river or lake islands.

=== Extreme points ===
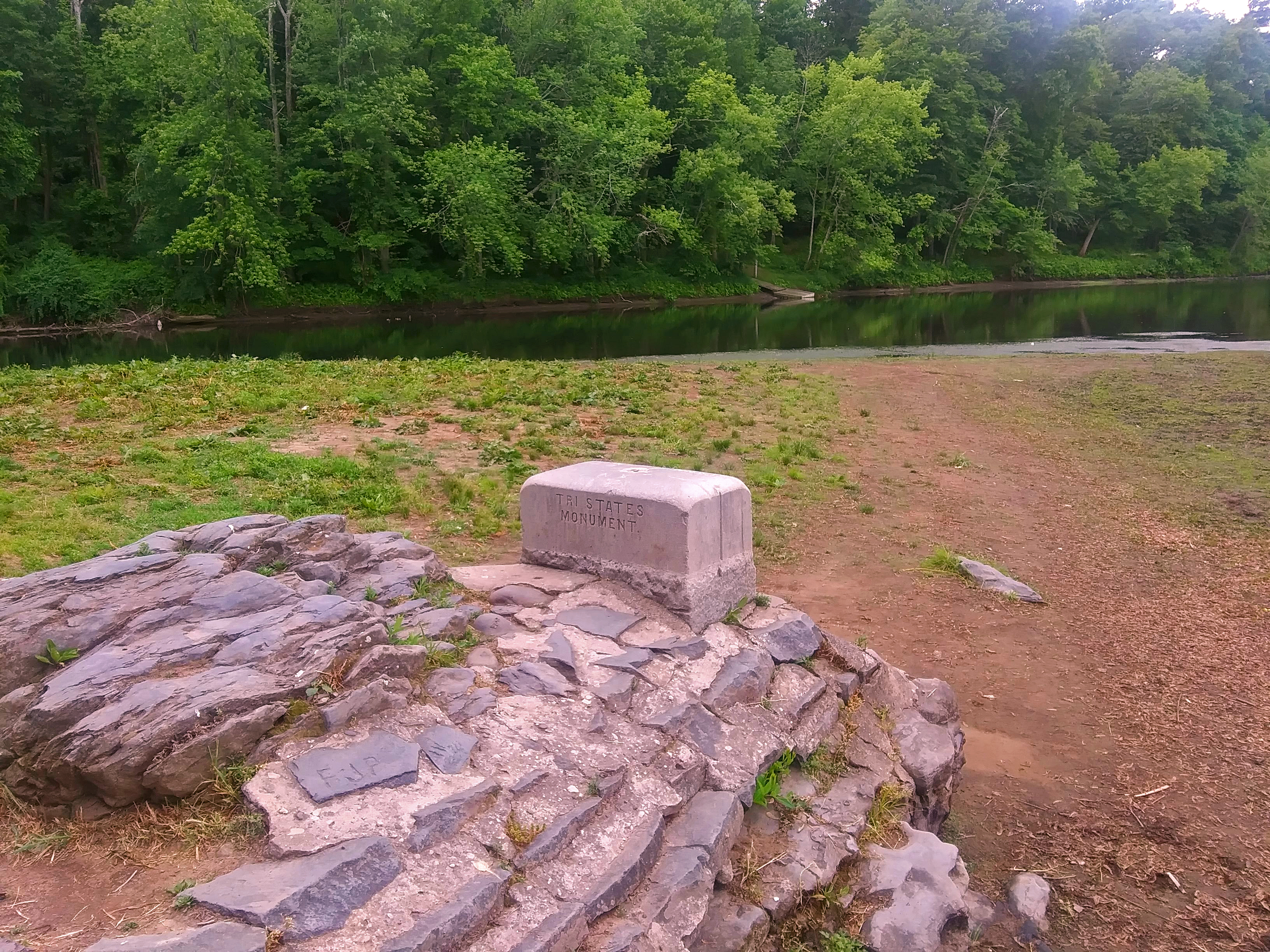
Tri-States monument, New Jersey's northernmost point, looking south into the rest of the state

Station Rock, easternmost point

- Northernmost point: Tri-States Monument, Montague Township, Sussex County. (41.3573°N 74.6947°W)
- Southernmost point: Cape May, Cape May County. (38.9283°N 74.9345°W
- Easternmost point: Station Rock, base of the Palisades, Hudson River shoreline, Alpine, Bergen County (40.9973°N 73.9027°W)
- Westernmost point: Along Delaware state line at Finns Point (39.6229°N 75.5597°W)
- Highest point: High Point, 1,803 ft (550 m) (41.3215°N 74.6613°W)
- Lowest point: Sea level

== Geology ==
Around 250 million years ago, during the Paleozoic and Mesozoic eras, the area that is today New Jersey bordered northern Africa as part of the supercontinent of Pangea. The pressure of the collision between North America and Africa gave rise to the Appalachian Mountains. Around 200 million years ago, Pangea began to break apart, separating the North American continent from the African continent. Around 18,000 years ago, the most recent ice age resulted in glaciers that reached New Jersey. As the glaciers retreated, they left behind Lake Passaic, as well as many rivers, swamps, and gorges.

=== Physiographic Provinces ===
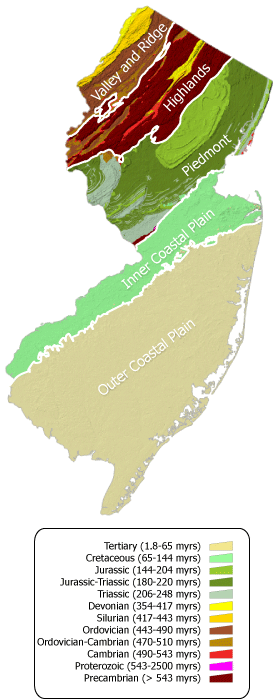
Physiographic Provinces of New Jersey

New Jersey is a region with a high variety of geographical features in a small area. The area can be broken into five regions, corresponding roughly to geological zones. These regions from north to south are the Appalachian Valley and Ridge, Highlands, Newark Basin Piedmont, Inner Coastal Plain, and the Outer Coastal Plain.

==== Appalachian Valley and Ridge Physiographic Province ====
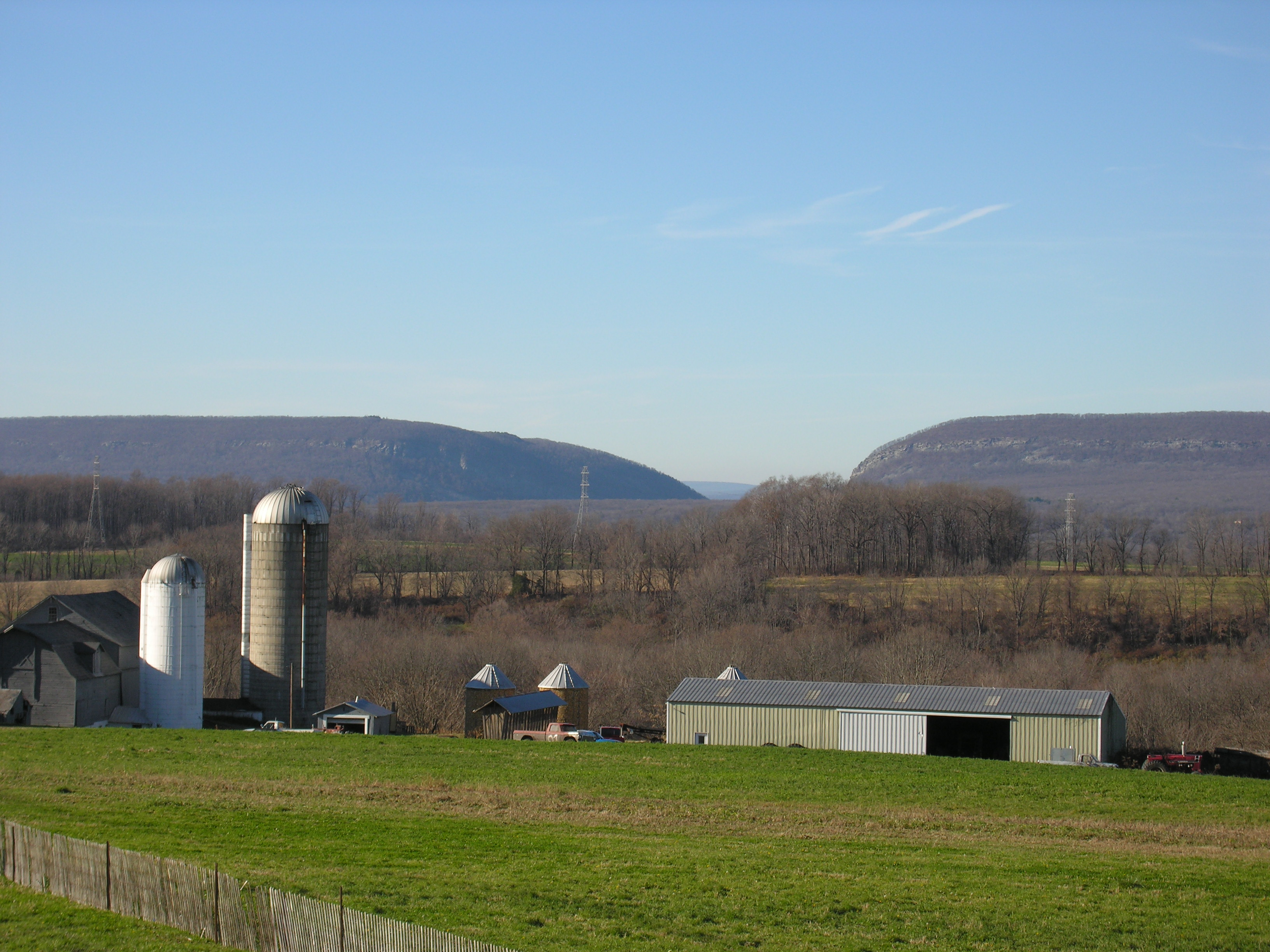
The Delaware Water Gap from Knowlton Township in New Jersey.

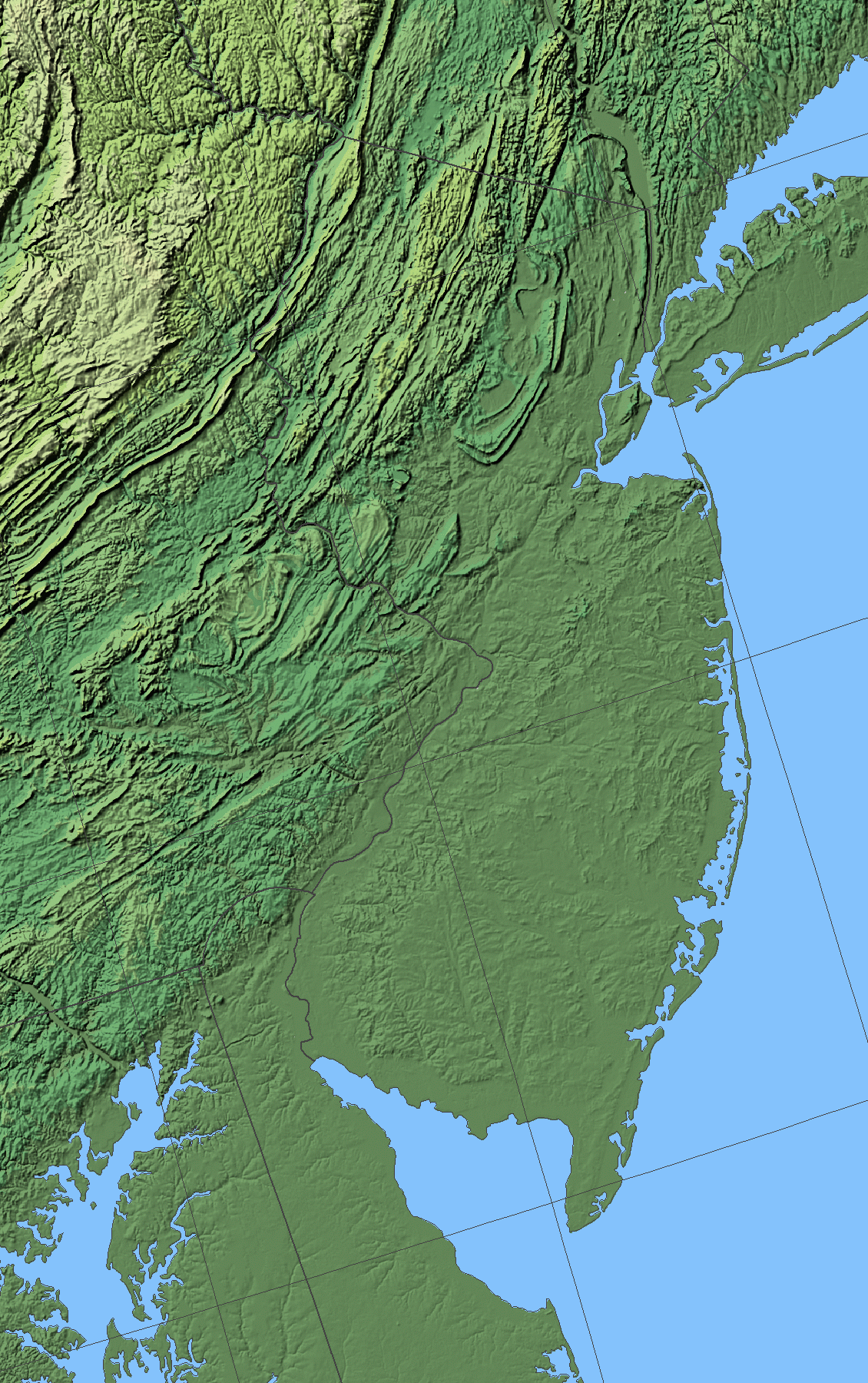
Shaded relief map

The Appalachian Valley and Ridge lies in the northwestern corner of the state and includes the Kittatinny Mountains, several smaller valleys and the popular Delaware Water Gap. The state's highest point, the aptly named High Point is within this area, at 1,803 feet (550 m). Most of the state's section of the Appalachian Trail runs through this area. The province is bounded on the southeast by an unconformity between Cambrian and Precambrian formations.

==== Highlands Physiographic Province ====
The Highlands Physiographic Province is a geological formation composed primarily of Precambrian igneous and metamorphic rock running from the Delaware River near Musconetcong Mountain, northeast through the Skylands Region of New Jersey along the Bearfort Ridge and the Ramapo Mountains. Numerous abandoned mines dot the region, dating from the 18th and 19th centuries when iron, copper, zinc and other minerals were extracted from the formations. The glaciated northern half of the province has an abundance of lakes and reservoirs which serve as water supplies for the urban areas to the east. The region's watershed is protected by the Highlands Water Protection and Planning Act.

==== Newark Basin Piedmont ====
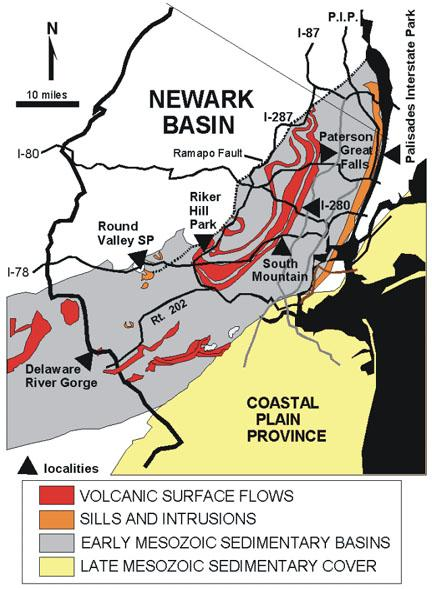
USGS map of the Newark Basin showing major highways

The Newark Basin is a region in northern New Jersey defined by the boundaries of a sediment-filled rift basin. This basin was formed when the supercontinent Pangaea began to split approximately 220 million years ago, causing several large depressions to form due to extension, which then filled with sediment. The basin itself extends from Rockland County in the southern tip of New York to south-eastern Pennsylvania. It lies within the broader region known as the Piedmont, a crescent-shaped area characterized by smooth topography and large volumes of sediments. Like the Piedmont, the Newark Basin has gentle topography consisting of red bed clastic sediments with occasional igneous rock formations, such as the Palisades Sill and the Watchung basalt flows; these igneous features are responsible for the dramatic elevation changes observed in the region, such as The Palisades and the Watchung Mountains, respectively. The boundaries of the Newark Basin, as well as major highways, are shown on the map at left......

For the geological history of the region, see Newark Basin.

==== Inner Coastal Plain ====
The Inner Coastal Plain province consists of lowlands and rolling hills underlain by Cretaceous deposits. Surficial geology in this region contains a number of fossils. The Monmouth County Park system, for example, includes a number of creeks where students and enthusiasts can gain real field exposure to cretaceous geology and paleontology. (Always check with the park service staff regarding permissibility before entering any field site.) The region's northwest border lies along the Piedmont Fall Line. Fertile, loamy soil makes the land ideal for agriculture and is responsible for New Jersey's nickname of the "Garden State". Its deposits of Greensand marl containing potash were used since colonial days by farmers to fertilize their fields.

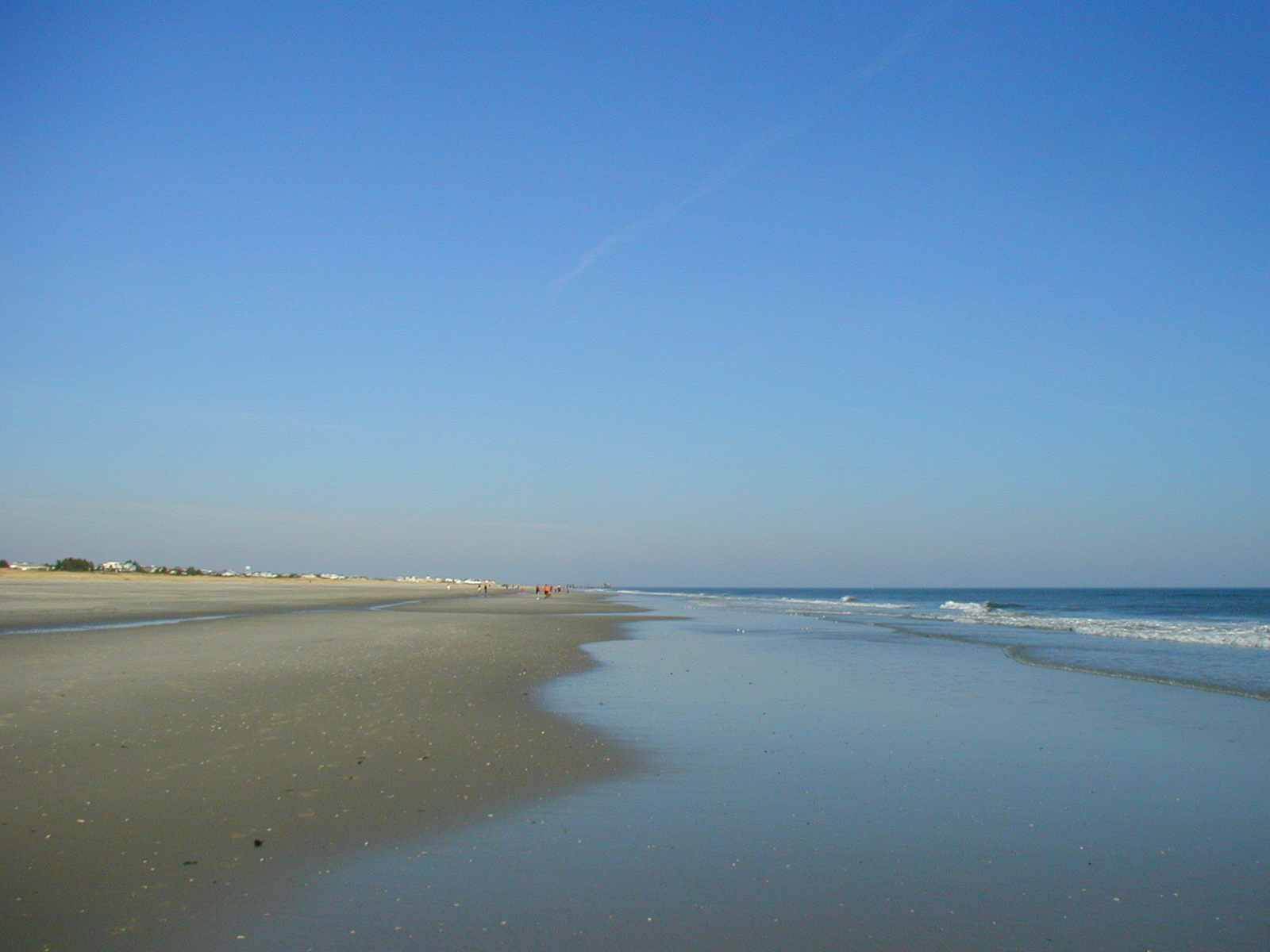
Beach at Avalon.

==== Outer Coastal Plain ====
The outer coastal plain consists of unconsolidated Tertiary deposits of sands, silt, and gravels. The soils are sandy with less clay than the inner coastal plain, and are more acidic and dry. The lack of fertility makes much of the region unsuitable for agriculture and large areas remain undeveloped. The sandy Pine Barrens, an area that is agriculturally poor but species rich, occupy the center of the province. Blueberries and cranberries have been cultivated in lowland bogs that have accumulated depths of organic matter.

Along the coast, sandy beaches attract a recreation industry, and the offshore barrier islands are popular vacation destinations.

== Natural environment ==
New Jersey's natural environment preserves a range of habitats ranging from the Atlantic shore to the Appalachian Mountains. The sandy uplands of South Jersey are home to the Atlantic coastal pine barrens. Surrounding the Pine Barrens, along the coast and covering the Inner Coastal Plain and Piedmont, are the Northeastern coastal forests. The Highlands consist of Appalachian-Blue Ridge forests which grade into Allegheny Highlands forests in the far northeast.

== See also ==
- New York–New Jersey Harbor Estuary
- Geography of the United States
- History of New Jersey
