= Area codes 814 and 582 =

Telephone area codes in Pennsylvania

Coordinates: 40.921°N 78.761°W

Pennsylvania (blue) with numbering plan area 814 shown in red.

Area codes 814 and 582 are telephone area codes in the North American Numbering Plan (NANP) for the northwestern and central portions of the Commonwealth of Pennsylvania. Cities served by the area code include Altoona, Bradford, DuBois, Erie, Meadville, Oil City, Titusville, Johnstown, St. Marys, and Warren as well as the boroughs of State College, Brockway, Clearfield, Huntingdon, Mount Union, Bedford, Clarion, Punxsutawney, Tyrone, Ebensburg, Coudersport, Ridgway and Brookville. Area code 814 is the original area code assigned to the numbering plan area in 1947. In 2021, area code 582 was activated in the service area as an additional code to form an overlay numbering plan.

== History ==
Area code 814 is one of the original North American area codes established in 1947. Its numbering plan area (NPA) is the largest in the state. It is the only one of Pennsylvania's original four NPAs that still has its original boundaries. The largest cities in the area are Johnstown, Altoona, State College and Erie; otherwise this region is largely rural.

On April 30, 2020, the Pennsylvania Public Utility Commission approved area code 582 for an all-service overlay, in the face of projections that 814 would exhaust in late 2022. From October 3, 2020 to April 3, 2021, a permissive dialing period was in effect, during which both seven- and ten-digit dialing was allowed for area code 814. The in-service date for the overlay was May 1, 2021, when assignments of central office codes with area code 582 were permissible, given that all prefixes in 814 had been exhausted.

== Split controversy ==
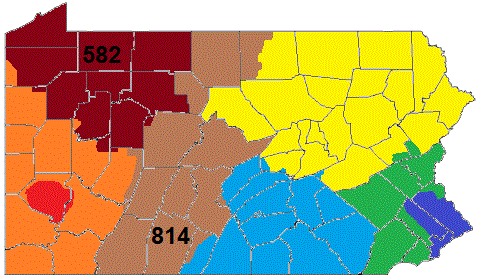
Map of previous proposed split of 814 with 582, showing county lines.

When numbering pool exhaustion became a threat in the 2000s, the Pennsylvania Public Utility Commission (PUC) approved an area code split in December 2009, that would have assigned area code 582 to most of the northwestern portion of the territory, including Erie, by 2012. The proposed new numbering plan area would have served Erie, Crawford, Warren, Venango, Forest, Clarion, Jefferson, Elk, McKean counties and parts of Armstrong, Clearfield, Indiana, and Mercer. The remaining counties would have retained area code 814. Under the plan, most of Clearfield and Indiana counties would have retained 814; most of Armstrong and Mercer counties would continue in area code 724.

After the decision, a grassroots movement circulated an online petition to request the commission to cancel the action in favor of an overlay plan, a change also supported by the telecommunication industry.

By February 27, 2012, the projected exhaustion date for 814 was changed to the second quarter of 2018, causing the PUC in a 5–0 vote on April 26, 2012 to dismiss the split plan and implementation schedule. Following projections suggested that 814 would be exhausted by 2021.

== Service area ==
The numbering plan area comprises parts of twenty-seven counties.

- Armstrong County (northeastern portion only)
- Bedford County
- Blair County
- Cambria County
- Cameron County
- Centre County (majority of area)
- Clarion County (all except portions of west)
- Clearfield County
- Clinton County (small portions)
- Crawford County (all except southwestern portion)
- Elk County
- Erie County
- Fayette County (a small portion may be assigned to 814, but most if not all uses 724)
- Forest County
- Fulton County (western portions)
- Huntingdon County (except Kishacoquillas Valley and extreme southeast portions)
- Indiana County (northern and eastern portions only)
- Jefferson County
- McKean County
- Mercer County (extreme northeastern portion)
- Mifflin County (extreme southwestern corner only)
- Potter County
- Somerset County
- Tioga County (western portions only)
- Venango County (all except southeastern corner)
- Warren County
- Westmoreland County (extreme northeastern corner only)

== See also ==
- List of Pennsylvania area codes
- List of North American Numbering Plan area codes

Pennsylvania area codes: 215/267/445, 412, 570/272, 610/484/835, 717/223, 724, 814/582, 878
	North: 226/519/548, 585, 607, 716, 289/365/905, Lake Erie	
West: 724/878, 436/440	582/814	East: 272/570, 223/717
	South: 301/240	
Maryland area codes: 301/240/227, 410/443/667
New York area codes: 212/332/646, 315/680, 363/516, 518/838, 585, 607, 631/934, 624/716, 347/718/929, 329/845, 914, 917
Ohio area codes: 216, 330/234, 419/567, 440/436, 513/283, 614/380, 740/220, 937/326
Ontario area codes: 416/437/647/942, 519/226/548/382, 613/343/753, 705/249/683, 807, 905/289/365/742
