= Area codes 609 and 640 =

Telephone area codes in central and southeastern New Jersey

Coordinates: 39.971°N 74.570°W

Numbering plan areas and area codes of New Jersey

Area codes 609 and 640 are telephone overlay area codes in the North American Numbering Plan (NANP) for the central and southern parts of the U.S. state of New Jersey. The numbering plan area includes the communities of Trenton, Princeton, Ewing, Hamilton, and southeastern parts of the state and the Jersey Shore, including Atlantic City and Long Beach Island. In terms of geographic coverage, it is the largest numbering plan area in New Jersey. Area code 609 was created in a split of area code 201 in 1956. Area code 640 is an additional area code for the area, created on September 17, 2018.

== History ==
In the original configuration of the first nationwide telephone numbering plan of 1947, all of New Jersey was a single numbering plan area, assigned the lowest-numbered area code, 201. In 1956, it was split to create a second numbering plan area, 609.

Division of New Jersey into two numbering plan area in 1956. However, it was not until July 1963, when New Jersey customers were required to dial the area code when calling to a location in the state, but outside of their own numbering plan area.

This division generally followed the dividing line between North Jersey, proximate to New York City, and South Jersey, proximate to Philadelphia and the Jersey Shore. Despite the division into two numbering plan areas, all calls within the state of New Jersey were dialed without area codes until July 21, 1963.

Despite the presence of the Philadelphia suburbs, Trenton, Princeton and Atlantic City, South Jersey is not as densely populated as North Jersey. As a result, while North Jersey went from one area code to four during the 1990s, 609 remained the sole area code for the southern half of New Jersey for 41 years. By the late 1990s, the proliferation of cell phones and pagers, particularly in the Philadelphia suburbs, Trenton, and in Atlantic City, necessitated a new area code in South Jersey.

In 1999, the southwestern part of the 609 territory, including most of the New Jersey side of the Philadelphia area, was split off with area code 856. The new area code entered service on June 14; permissive dialing of 609 continued across South Jersey until November 14. Since that time, the 609 territory includes parts of Central Jersey, South Jersey and the Jersey Shore, and many parts of Burlington County. It also includes portions of southern Middlesex County in Plainsboro, Cranbury, parts of South Brunswick (particularly Kingston) and the extreme southern part of Monroe. The boundary was drawn so that several towns were divided between by area codes, but office code protection afforded the convenience of seven-digit dialing.

An October 2014 exhaustion forecast expected the 609 number pool to be exhausted by the second quarter of 2017, about 15 months later than projected a year earlier. Permissive dialing for all calls in 609 began on January 20, 2018, and ended August 18 when ten-digit dialing became mandatory. Overlay code 640 entered operation on September 17, 2018. With the implementation of the overlay, the New Jersey Board of Public Utilities ordered the removal of central office code protection for a group of central offices between NPA 609 and 856, that had been in effect since the 1999 split to permit seven-digit dialing in the local area to the adjacent NPA.

== See also ==
- List of New Jersey area codes
- List of North American Numbering Plan area codes

New Jersey area codes: 201/551, 609/640, 732/848, 856, 908, 852/973
	North: 732/848, 908	
West: 215/267/445, 856	609/640	East: Atlantic Ocean
	South: 302	
New York area codes: 212/332/646, 315/680, 363/516, 518/838, 585, 607, 631/934, 624/716, 347/718/929, 329/845, 914, 917
Pennsylvania area codes: 215/267/445, 412, 570/272, 610/484/835, 717/223, 724, 814/582, 878
Delaware area codes: 302
