= Area codes 845 and 329 =

Telephone area code in New York state

Coordinates: 41°36′0″N 74°12′36″W

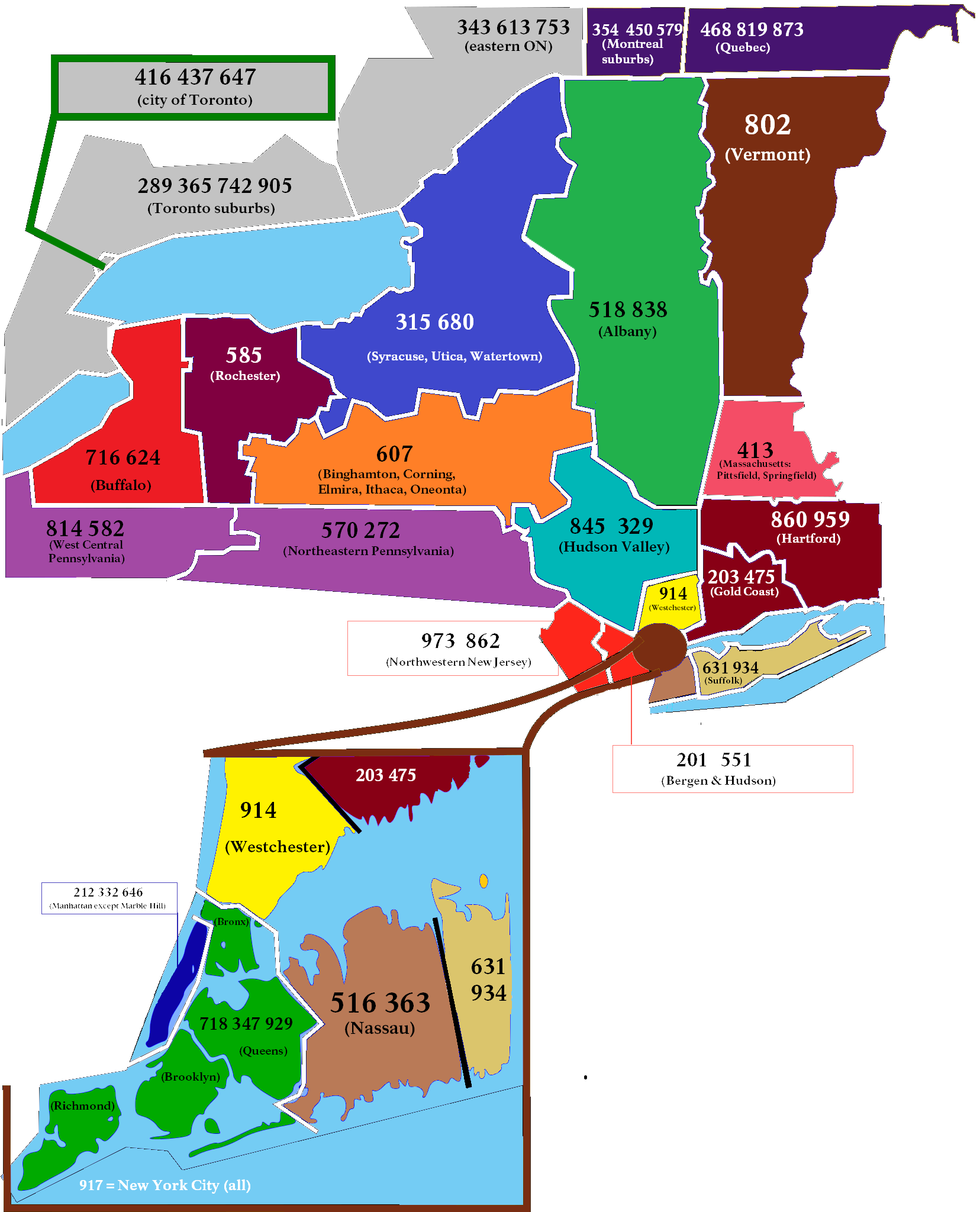
Area codes in New York state; area codes 845 and 329 highlighted in teal

Area codes 845 and 329 are telephone area codes in the North American Numbering Plan (NANP) for the U.S. state of New York. The numbering plan area comprises the mid- and lower Hudson Valley, specifically Orange, Putnam, Rockland, and Ulster counties, and parts of Columbia, Delaware, Dutchess, Greene, and Sullivan counties.

Area code 845 was created on June 5, 2000, by an area code split from most of the territory of area code 914, which was retained by Westchester County.

Prior to October 2021, area code 845 had telephone numbers assigned for the central office code 988. In 2020, 988 was designated nationwide as a dialing code for the National Suicide Prevention Lifeline, which created a conflict for exchanges that permit seven-digit dialing. This area code was therefore scheduled to transition to ten-digit dialing by October 24, 2021.

On May 11, 2022, the North American Numbering Plan Administrator (NANPA) authorized the new area code 329 for an overlay of the 845 area, which had entered service on March 24, 2023.

== Service area ==
Numbering plan area 845/329 includes the following communities.

- Airmont
- Beacon
- Beekman
- Blauvelt
- Brewster
- Carmel
- Chester
- Chestnut Ridge
- Clarkstown
- Clinton Corners
- Congers
- Cornwall
- Cold Spring
- Cottekill
- Crawford
- Dover Plains
- East Fishkill
- Fishkill
- Fleischmanns
- Garrison
- Goshen
- Halcott
- Haverstraw
- High Falls
- Highland
- Hopewell Junction
- Hyde Park
- Jeffersonville
- Kingston
- LaGrange
- Liberty
- Mahopac
- Margaretville
- Middletown
- Millbrook
- Monroe
- Monsey
- Montebello
- Monticello
- Montgomery
- Nanuet
- Nelsonville
- Newburgh
- New City
- New Paltz
- New Windsor
- Nyack
- Olive
- Orangetown
- Patterson
- Pawling
- Pearl River
- Phoenicia
- Piermont
- Pleasant Valley
- Pine Bush
- Pomona
- Port Jervis
- Poughkeepsie
- Red Hook
- Rhinebeck
- Rosendale
- Saugerties
- Sloatsburg
- Spring Valley
- Staatsburg
- Stone Ridge
- Stony Point
- Suffern
- Tappan
- Valley Cottage
- Walden
- Wallkill
- Wappingers Falls
- Warwick
- Washingtonville
- Wingdale
- West Nyack
- West Point
- Woodbury
- Woodstock

New York area codes: 212/332/646, 315/680, 363/516, 518/838, 585, 607, 631/934, 624/716, 347/718/929, 329/845, 914, 917
	North: 518/838	
West: 570/272, 607	area code 845/329	East: 203, 860, 914
	South: 201/551, 862/973, 914	
Connecticut area codes: 203/475, 860/959
New Jersey area codes: 201/551, 609/640, 732/848, 856, 908, 852/973
Pennsylvania area codes: 215/267/445, 412, 570/272, 610/484/835, 717/223, 724, 814/582, 878
