= Area codes 740 and 220 =

Telephone area codes for southeastern Ohio

Coordinates: 39°0′0″N 82°30′0″W

The numbering plan areas (blue) and area codes of Ohio

Area codes 740 and 220 are telephone area codes in the North American Numbering Plan (NANP) for the southeastern and central parts of Ohio. The numbering plan area (NPA) includes the cities of Athens, Belpre, Cadiz, Chillicothe, Circleville, Coshocton, Delaware, Gallipolis, Heath, Ironton, Jackson, Lancaster, Laurelville, Logan, Marietta, Marion, Mount Vernon, Nelsonville, Newark, Newcomerstown, Pataskala, Portsmouth, Rockbridge, Steubenville, Washington Court House, and Zanesville, Shadyside and the surrounding areas. It does not include the city of Columbus and rate centers in Franklin County which primarily use area code 614. Although it is Ohio's largest area code by geographic size, Southeastern Ohio is largely rural and has fewer residents overall than the rest of the state except in the areas near Columbus. 220 is also the lowest-numbered area code that doesn't have a 0 or 1 in the middle.

== History ==
Area code 740 was established by an area code split of area code 614 on November 8, 1997. By the end of 2013, exhaust studies indicated that the 740 area code would run out of telephone numbers sometime in 2015. The Public Utilities Commission of Ohio chose a relief plan by implementing an overlay with new area code 220, effective April 22, 2015. This requires all calls within the numbering plan area to be dialed using the full ten-digit telephone number.

== See also ==
- List of Ohio area codes
- List of North American Numbering Plan area codes

Ohio area codes: 216, 330/234, 419/567, 440/436, 513/283, 614/380, 740/220, 937/326
	North: 419/567, 330/234	
West: 937/326, 614/380	740/220	East: 304/681
	South: 606, 304/681	
Kentucky area codes: 270/364, 502, 606, 859
Pennsylvania area codes: 215/267/445, 412, 570/272, 610/484/835, 717/223, 724, 814/582, 878
West Virginia area codes: 304/681
