= Area codes 440 and 436 =

Telephone area code in the Cleveland, Ohio area

Coordinates: 41°45′N 81°0′W

The numbering plan areas (blue) and area codes of Ohio

Area codes 440 and 436 are telephone area codes in the North American Numbering Plan (NANP) for the U.S. state of Ohio, serving the parts of the Greater Cleveland area, surrounding the city of Cleveland, but not the city and most of its inner suburbs.

== History ==
Area code 440 was established on August 16, 1997, in a three-way split of area code 216, one of the original North American area codes, to provide relief from central office prefix exhaustion from increasing popularity of cellular phones and population pressure. The 216 numbering plan area (NPA) had already been divided the preceding year in 1996 to create area code 330 to the south, with NPA 216 stretching along the coast of Lake Erie.

Prior to October 2021, area code 440 had telephone numbers assigned for the central office code 988. In 2020, 988 was designated nationwide as a dialing code for the National Suicide Prevention Lifeline, which created a conflict for exchanges that permit seven-digit dialing. This area code was therefore scheduled to transition to ten-digit dialing by October 24, 2021.

In December 2022, the Public Utilities Commission of Ohio announced a projection that the pool of available telephone numbers for the 440 area code would be exhausted by the third quarter of 2024. The Commission approved a plan of relief action which prescribes an all-service overlay in the numbering plan area with the new area code 436. The activation date was March 1, 2024.

== Service area ==
The overlay complex serves most of the southern, western, and eastern suburbs of Cleveland, including the larger cities and communities of Ashtabula, Chardon, Eastlake, Elyria, Lorain, Mentor, North Olmsted, North Ridgeville, North Royalton, Parma, Solon, Strongsville, Westlake and Willoughby. It serves all of Lake and Geauga counties. It also serves almost all of Ashtabula and Lorain counties, part of Erie County, the northeast corner of Huron County, and the northwest part of Trumbull County. It also covers far eastern Cuyahoga County, the rest of which stayed in 216.

The largest city in the numbering plan area is Parma, Ohio.

== See also ==
- List of Ohio area codes
- List of North American Numbering Plan area codes

Ohio area codes: 216, 330/234, 419/567, 440/436, 513/283, 614/380, 740/220, 937/326
	North: 216, 519/226/548/382, Lake Erie	
West: 419/567	area code 440/436	East: 724/878, 814/582
	South: 330/234, 419/567	
Ontario area codes: 416/437/647/942, 519/226/548/382, 613/343/753, 705/249/683, 807, 905/289/365/742
Pennsylvania area codes: 215/267/445, 412, 570/272, 610/484/835, 717/223, 724, 814/582, 878
