= Area code 607 =

Area code in the Southern Tier of New York

Coordinates: 42.34°N 75.86°W

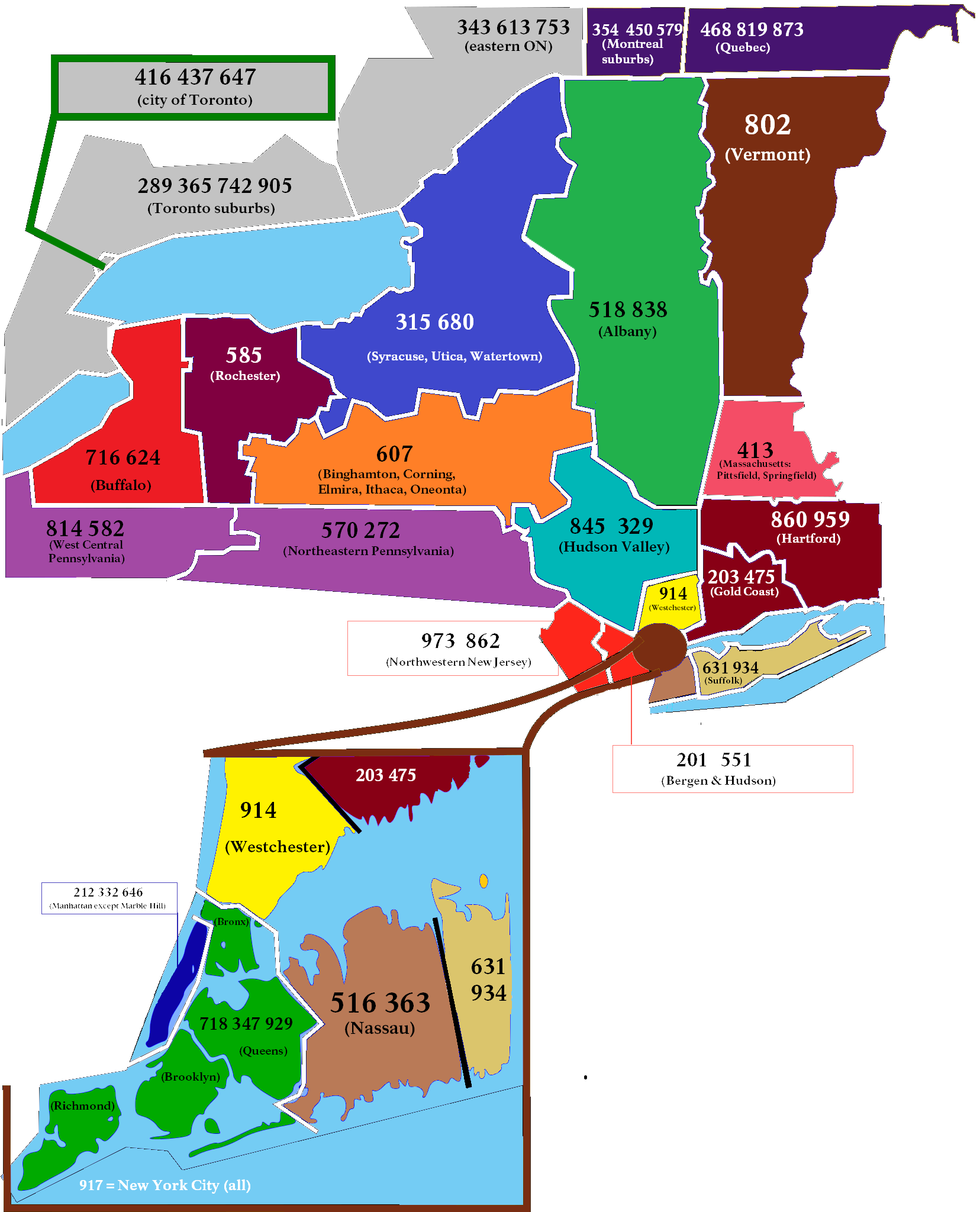
Area codes in New York state; area code 607 highlighted in orange

Area code 607 is a telephone area code in the North American Numbering Plan for the U.S. state of New York. It serves parts of its Southern Tier, which borders around Pennsylvania. The numbering plan area (NPA) was created in 1954 by combining a southern part of 315 and an eastern part of 716.

== History ==
When the American Telephone and Telegraph Company (AT&T) designed the first nationwide telephone numbering plan in North America in the late 1940s, area codes with the middle digit 0 were assigned only to numbering plan areas that comprised an entire state. Along with 507 in Minnesota and 606 in Kentucky, 607 was among the first such area codes to be created in an area code split. Area code 607 is not only one of only three area codes in the state of New York to have yet to be overlaid, along with 585 and 914, but is still the only area code in the state to have not needed exhaustion relief.

Prior to October 2021, area code 607 had telephone numbers assigned for the central office code 988. In 2020, 988 was designated nationwide as a dialing code for the National Suicide Prevention Lifeline, which created a conflict for exchanges that permit seven-digit dialing. This area code was therefore scheduled to transition to ten-digit dialing by October 24, 2021.

== Service area ==
=== Counties ===
- Allegany County (part)
- Broome County
- Chemung County
- Chenango County
- Cortland County
- Delaware County
- Otsego County
- Schoharie County (part)
- Schuyler County
- Steuben County
- Sullivan County (part)
- Tioga County
- Tompkins County
- Yates County

=== Cities ===
- Binghamton
- Corning
- Cortland
- Delhi
- Elmira
- Hornell
- Ithaca
- Norwich
- Oneonta
- Waverly
- Deposit
- Owego
- Vestal

== See also ==
- List of New York area codes
- List of North American Numbering Plan area codes

New York area codes: 212/332/646, 315/680, 363/516, 518/838, 585, 607, 631/934, 624/716, 347/718/929, 329/845, 914, 917
	North: 315	
West: 585, 716	607	East: 518, 845
	South: 570/272, 814/582	
Pennsylvania area codes: 215/267/445, 412, 570/272, 610/484/835, 717/223, 724, 814/582, 878
