= Area codes 330 and 234 =

Telephone area codes in northeast Ohio, United States

Coordinates: 41°N 81°W

The numbering plan areas (blue) and area codes of Ohio

Area codes 330 and 234 are telephone area codes in the North American Numbering Plan (NANP) for a part of northeast Ohio. The numbering plan area (NPA) includes the cities of Akron, Canton, Youngstown, and Warren.

Area code 330 was established on March 9, 1996 in an area code split of area code 216. It was Ohio's first new area code since the creation of NANP in 1947.

Area code 234, originally planned as the relief code for the Jacksonville, Florida area, was established on October 30, 2000, to form an overlay plan for the service area. Ten-digit dialing has been mandatory since October 1, 2000.

== See also ==
- List of Ohio area codes
- List of North American Numbering Plan area codes

Ohio area codes: 216, 330/234, 419/567, 440/436, 513/283, 614/380, 740/220, 937/326
	North: 216, 440/436	
West: 419/567	330/234	East: 724/878
	South: 740/220, 304/681	
Pennsylvania area codes: 215/267/445, 412, 570/272, 610/484/835, 717/223, 724, 814/582, 878
West Virginia area codes: 304/681
