= White, Pennsylvania =

Unincorporated community in Pennsylvania, US

- Unincorporated community
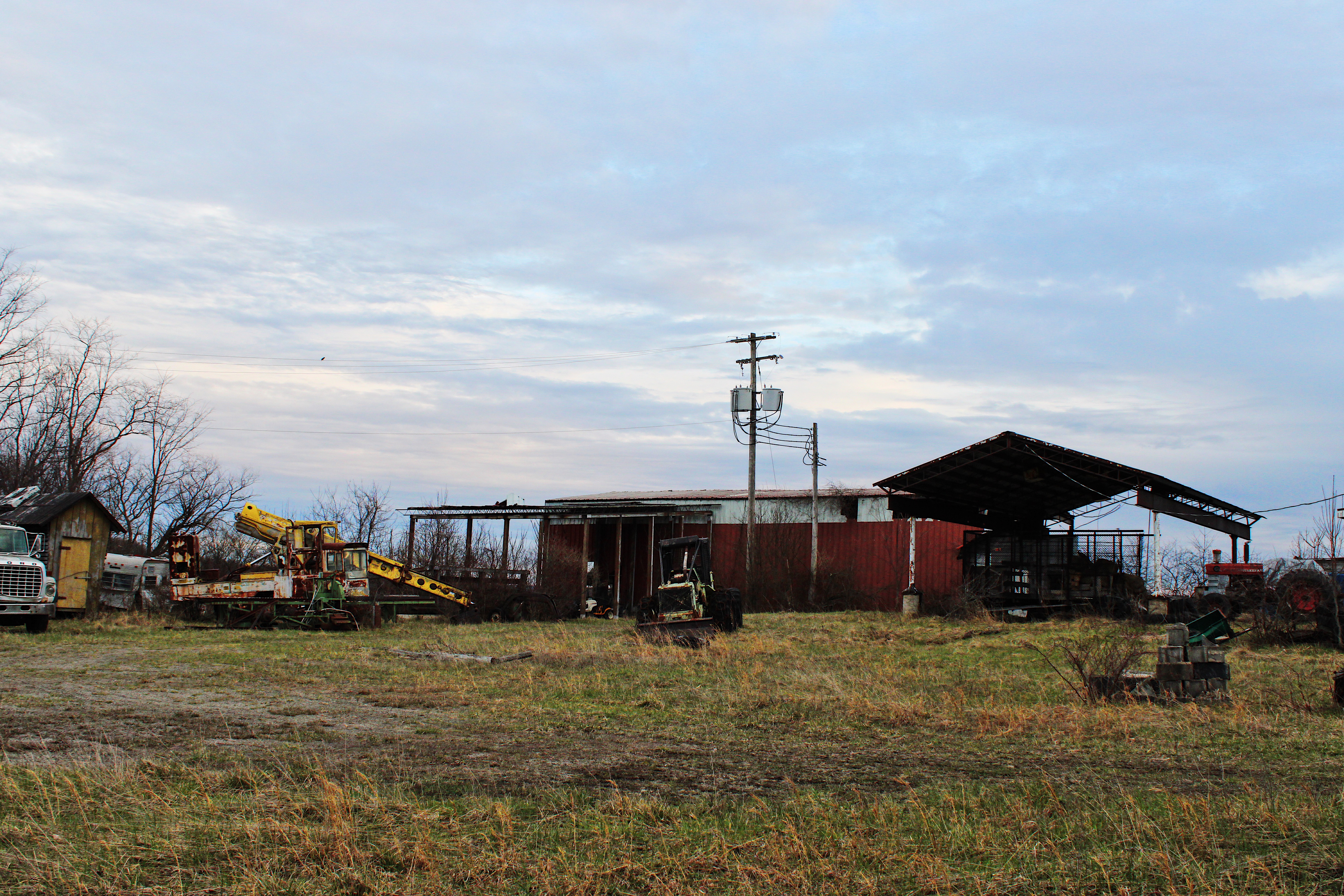
- Farm in White

- Location within Pennsylvania
- Coordinates: 40°04′12″N 79°26′13″W
- Country: United States
- State: Pennsylvania
- County: Fayette
- Elevation: 1,919 ft (585 m)
- Time zone: UTC-5 (Eastern (EST))
  - Summer (DST): UTC-4 (EDT)
- ZIP code: 15490
- Area codes: 724, 878
- GNIS feature ID: 1191246

White is an unincorporated community in Fayette County, Pennsylvania, United States. The community is 8.9 miles (14.3 km) east-northeast of Connellsville. White has a post office with ZIP code 15490, which opened on June 21, 1883.
