= Area codes 203 and 475 =

Area codes for southwestern Connecticut

Coordinates: 41.35°N 72.90°W

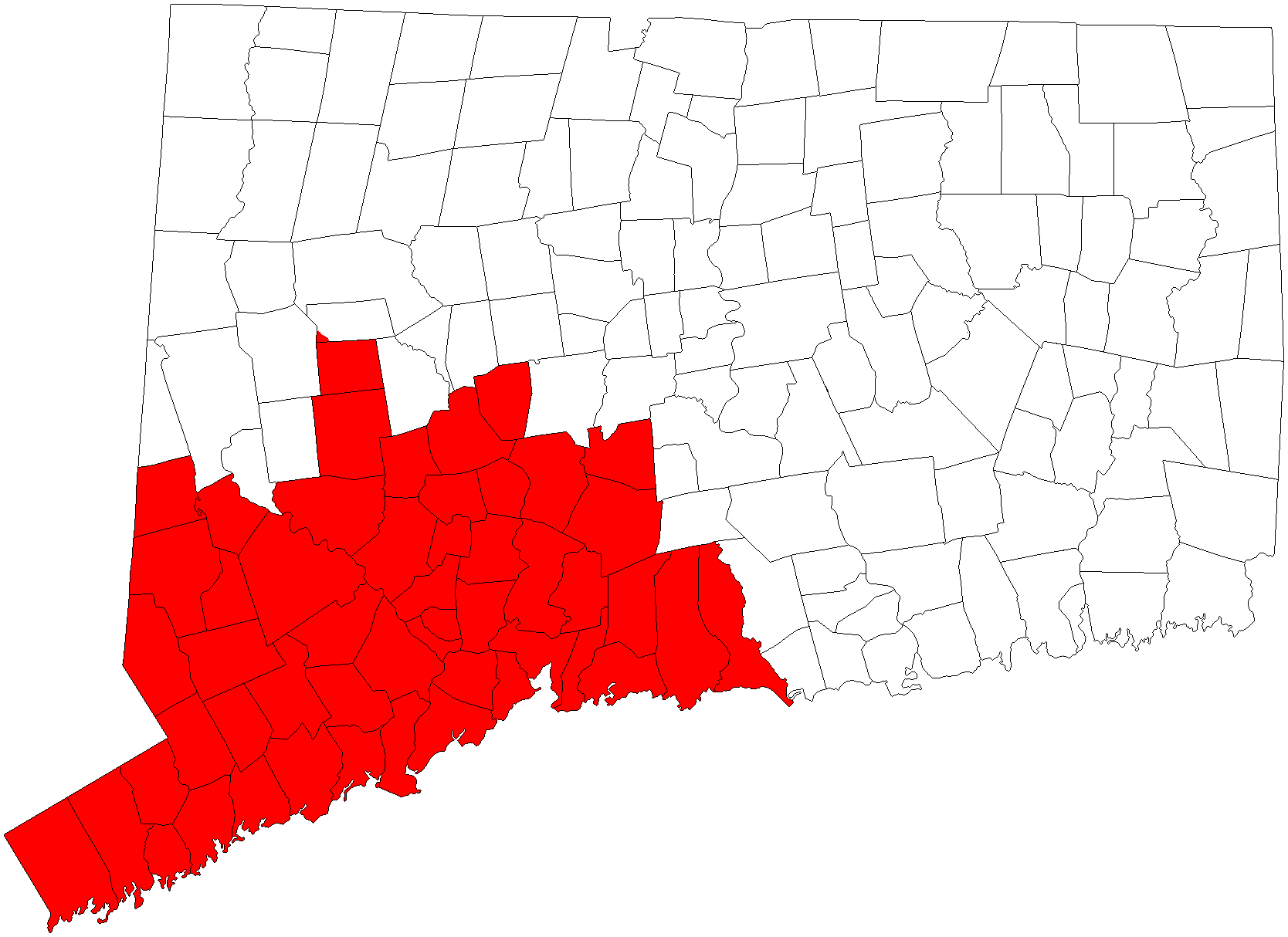
Municipal map of Connecticut with numbering plan area 203/475 highlighted (red).

Area codes 203 and 475 are telephone area codes in the North American Numbering Plan (NANP) for the southwestern part of the U.S. state of Connecticut. The numbering plan area (NPA) is mostly coextensive with the Connecticut portion of the New York metropolitan area, and comprises most of Fairfield County, all of New Haven County, and a small portion of Litchfield County.

== History ==
When the American Telephone and Telegraph Company (AT&T) established the first nationwide telephone numbering plan in 1947, Connecticut was designated as a single numbering plan area (NPA), with area code 203, one of the 86 original North American area codes.

On August 28, 1995, the state was divided into two NPAs, reducing the area of 203 to today's extent and adding area code 860 for the remainder of the state. Area code 860 was eventually overlaid with 959, and NPA 203 received a second area code when 475 was added on December 12, 2009. This overlay was first proposed by the Connecticut Department of Public Utility Control in August 1999.

Even though area code 475 overlays only 203, all callers in Connecticut (including those in area code 860) had to dial all calls with ten digits, effective November 14, 2009; this was in preparation for the overlay of area code 959 on area code 860 that was implemented in 2014.

The first range of telephone numbers made available in Connecticut's third area code was (475) 882-4xxx, in the Huntington section of Shelton.

== Service area ==
The counties included in the numbering plan area are:

Fairfield (except the Town of Sherman), New Haven, and Litchfield (the towns of Woodbury, Bethlehem, and a small part of Roxbury).

This serves the following cities and towns:

Ansonia, Beacon Falls, Bethany, Bethel, Bethlehem, Branford, Bridgeport, Brookfield, Cheshire, Danbury, Darien, Derby, East Haven, Easton, Fairfield, Greenwich, Guilford, Hamden, Madison, Meriden, Middlebury, Milford, Monroe, Naugatuck, New Canaan, New Fairfield, New Haven, Newtown, North Branford, North Haven, Norwalk, Orange, Oxford, Prospect, Redding, Ridgefield, a small part of Roxbury, Seymour, Shelton, Southbury, Stamford, Stratford, Trumbull, Wallingford, Waterbury, West Haven, Weston, Westport, Wilton, Wolcott, Woodbridge, and Woodbury.

The city of Meriden is notable as the only place in Connecticut from where one can call towns in either the Hartford or New Haven exchanges toll-free from a landline telephone.

== See also ==
- List of Connecticut area codes
- List of North American Numbering Plan area codes

Connecticut area codes: 203/475, 860/959
	North: 860/959	
West: 914, 845/329	203/475	East: 860/959
	South: 516/363, 631/934	
New York area codes: 212/332/646, 315/680, 363/516, 518/838, 585, 607, 631/934, 624/716, 347/718/929, 329/845, 914, 917
