= Speigle Heights, Lexington =

Speigle Heights
- Neighborhood of Lexington, Kentucky
- Interactive map of Speigle Heights
- Coordinates: 38.052°N 84.514°W
- Country: United States
- State: Kentucky
- County: Fayette
- City: Lexington

Area
  - Total: 0.133 sq mi (0.34 km^{2})

Population (2000)
  - Total: 420
  - Density: 3,157/sq mi (1,219/km^{2})
- Time zone: UTC-5 (Eastern (EST))
  - Summer (DST): UTC-4 (EDT)
- ZIP code: 40508
- Area code: 859

Speigle Heights is a neighborhood just northwest of downtown Lexington, Kentucky, United States. It is sometimes referred to as Irishtown. Its boundaries are Manchester Street to the north, Pine Street to the east, High Street/Versailles Road to the south, and Forbes Road to the west.

== Neighborhood statistics ==
- Population in 2000: 420
- Land area: 0.133
- Population density: 3,157
- Median income: $22,397
