= Kenwick, Lexington =

Kenwick
- Neighborhood of Lexington, Kentucky
- Interactive map of Kenwick
- Coordinates: 38.033°N 84.476°W
- Country: United States
- State: Kentucky
- County: Fayette
- City: Lexington
- Established: May 15, 1909

Area
  - Total: .250 sq mi (0.65 km^{2})
  - Water: 0 sq mi (0.0 km^{2})

Population (2000)
  - Total: 1,559
  - Density: 6,241/sq mi (2,410/km^{2})
- Time zone: UTC-5 (Eastern (EST))
  - Summer (DST): UTC-4 (EDT)
- ZIP code: 40502
- Area code: 859
- Website: kenwick.org

Kenwick is a neighborhood in southeastern Lexington, Kentucky, United States. Its boundaries are Sherman Avenue to the south, East Main Street to the west, railroad tracks to the north, and Richmond Avenue to the north.

== Neighborhood statistics ==
- Area: 0.250 square miles (0.65 km^{2})
- Population: 1,559
- Population density: 6,241 people per square mile
- Median household income (2010): $54,221
