= Cherokee Park, Lexington =

Coordinates: 38.02014°N 84.516654°W

Cherokee Park
- Neighborhood of Lexington, Kentucky
- Interactive map of Cherokee Park
- Country: United States
- State: Kentucky
- County: Fayette
- City: Lexington

Area
  - Total: 0.042 sq mi (0.11 km^{2})
  - Water: 0 sq mi (0.0 km^{2})

Population (2000)
  - Total: 76
  - Density: 1,826/sq mi (705/km^{2})
- Time zone: UTC-5 (Eastern (EST))
  - Summer (DST): UTC-4 (EDT)
- ZIP code: 40503
- Area code: 859

Cherokee Park is a neighborhood in southwestern Lexington, Kentucky, United States. Its boundaries are Rosemont Garden on the south, Nicholasville Road to the east, Dantzler Drive, and the Norfolk Southern railroad tracks to the west. It was developed by Dean William S. Taylor in the early 1920s.

== Neighborhood statistics ==
- Area: 0.042 square miles (0.11 km^{2})
- Population: 76
- Population density: 1,826 people per square mile
- Median household income (2010): $57,280
