= Westmoreland, Lexington =

Westmorland
- Neighborhood of Lexington, Kentucky
- Interactive map of Westmorland
- Coordinates: 38.045°N 84.634°W
- Country: United States
- State: Kentucky
- County: Fayette
- City: Lexington

Area
  - Total: 0.468 sq mi (1.21 km^{2})

Population (2000)
  - Total: 169
  - Density: 361/sq mi (139/km^{2})
- Time zone: UTC-5 (Eastern (EST))
  - Summer (DST): UTC-4 (EDT)
- ZIP code: 40510
- Area code: 859

Westmorland is a rural town west of Lexington, Kentucky, United States. It is located on the north side of Versailles Road between Rosalie Road and the Woodford County line.

== Neighborhood statistics ==
- Area: 0.468 square miles (1.21 km^{2})
- Population: 169 in 2000
- Population density: 361 per square mile (139/km^{2})
- Median household income (2009): $69,366
