= Cumberland Hill, Lexington =

Coordinates: 37.954519°N 84.494691°W

Cumberland Hill
- Neighborhood of Lexington, Kentucky
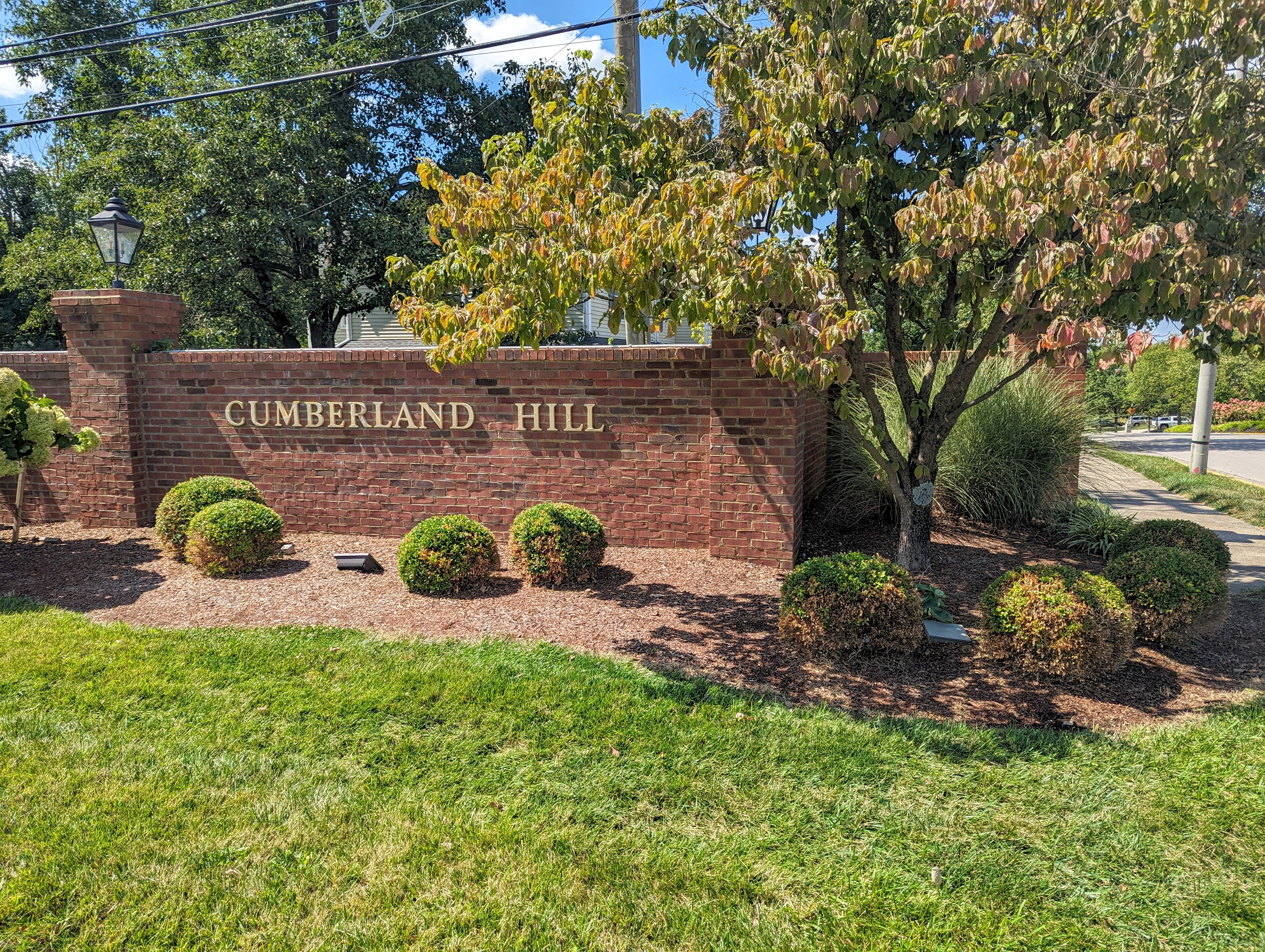
- Cumberland Hill Neighborhood Entrance
- Interactive map of Cumberland Hill
- Country: United States
- State: Kentucky
- County: Fayette
- City: Lexington

Population (2020)
  - Total: 2,100
- Time zone: UTC-5 (Eastern (EST))
  - Summer (DST): UTC-4 (EDT)
- ZIP code: 40515
- Area code: 859
- Website: cumberlandhill.net

Cumberland Hill is a neighborhood in southeastern Lexington, Kentucky, United States. Its boundaries are Hickman Creek to the west, Clearwater Way to the north, Tates Creek Road to the east, and Forest Lake Drive to the south. It is served by the Cumberland Hill Neighborhood Association and also has a private community pool available for residents and nonmembers. The Cumberland Hill Catfish are the neighborhood swim team.

== Neighborhood statistics ==
- Area: 0.262 square miles (0.68 km^{2})
- Population: 2,100
- Population density: 8,059.10 people per square mile
- Median household income: $97,239
- Median home price: $379,000

== Deed Restrictions ==
The Cumberland Hill Deed Restrictions document outlines the covenants, conditions, and restrictions for the use and occupancy of lots in Units 1-A and 1-B of the Cumberland Hill Subdivision in Fayette County, which are summarized as follows:

=== Key Provisions ===
1. Residential Use: All property in the unit must be used for single-family residential purposes only.
2. Animal Restrictions: No livestock or poultry; only household pets are allowed.
3. Fencing: Fences must conform to set-back lines.
4. Signage: No signs except house numbers and nameplates.
5. Microwave Dishes: No microwave receiving dishes allowed.
6. Subdivision of Lots: No further subdivision without permission.
7. Minimum Living Area: Specifies the minimum square footage based on house type.
  1. One-floor plan: 1800 Sq. Ft.
  2. 1 1/2 Story: Main Floor 1400 Sq. Ft. (2100 Sq. Ft. Total)
  3. 2 Story: Lower Floor 1100 Sq. Ft. (2200 Sq. Ft. Total)
8. Garage Requirement: All houses must have a two-car garage.
9. Sodding: Sod must be placed around the property post-construction.
10. Landscaping: Two shade trees must be planted in the front yard.
11. Trash and Debris: No waste or debris can be deposited on any lot.
