= Castlegate, Lexington =

Castlegate
- Neighborhood of Lexington, Kentucky
- Interactive map of Castlegate
- Coordinates: 38.002°N 84.482°W
- Country: United States
- State: Kentucky
- County: Fayette
- City: Lexington

Area
  - Total: .100 sq mi (0.26 km^{2})
  - Water: 0 sq mi (0.0 km^{2})

Population (2000)
  - Total: 208
  - Density: 2,083/sq mi (804/km^{2})
- Time zone: UTC-5 (Eastern (EST))
  - Summer (DST): UTC-4 (EDT)
- ZIP code: 40502
- Area code: 859

Castlegate is a neighborhood in southeastern Lexington, Kentucky, United States. its boundaries are Alumni Drive to the north and east, Chinoe Road to the west, and a combination of Colt Neck Lane and Lakeside Drive to the south.

== Neighborhood statistics ==
- Area: 0.100 square miles (0.26 km^{2})
- Population: 208
- Population density: 2,083 people per square mile
- Median household income: $55,010
