= Copperfield, Lexington =

Copperfield
- Neighborhood of Lexington, Kentucky
- Interactive map of Copperfield
- Coordinates: 37.982°N 84.573°W
- Country: United States
- State: Kentucky
- County: Fayette
- City: Lexington
- Established: 1989

Area
  - Total: 0.209 sq mi (0.54 km^{2})
  - Water: 0 sq mi (0.0 km^{2})

Population (2000)
  - Total: 426
  - Density: 2,042/sq mi (788/km^{2})
- Time zone: UTC-5 (Eastern (EST))
  - Summer (DST): UTC-4 (EDT)
- ZIP code: 40514
- Area code: 859
- Website: copperfieldlex.org

Copperfield is a neighborhood in southwestern Lexington, Kentucky, United States. Its boundaries are the Jessamine County line to the south, Clays Mill Road to the east, Twain Ridge Road to the north, and Calevares Drive to the west.

== Neighborhood statistics ==
- Area: 0.209 square miles (0.54 km^{2})
- Population: 426
- Population density: 2,042 people per square mile
- Median household income (2010): $82,714
