= List of Pennsylvania area codes =

Numbering plan areas and area codes of Pennsylvania (blue)

The Commonwealth of Pennsylvania is divided into seven distinct geographic numbering plan areas in the North American Numbering Plan, and served by a total of 15 area codes. All NPAs have at least two area codes, but the large metro area of Philadelphia has three, as well as the large region surrounding it in the southeast of the state.

In 1947, the American Telephone and Telegraph Company divided Pennsylvania into four numbering plan areas and assigned one distinct area code to each. Since 1995, several relief actions in form of area code splits and overlays have expanded the number of area codes. As a result, all numbering plan areas are overlay complexes and ten-digit dialing is mandatory statewide.

Area code	Year created	Parent NPA	Overlay	Numbering plan area
215	1947	–	215/267/445	Philadelphia and its immediately surrounding areas in the southeast corner of Pennsylvania
267	1997	215	215/267/445	Philadelphia and its immediately surrounding areas in the southeast corner of Pennsylvania
445	2018	215/267	215/267/445	Philadelphia and its immediately surrounding areas in the southeast corner of Pennsylvania
610	1994	215	484/610/835	Southeastern Pennsylvania outside Philadelphia, including the Lehigh Valley, but excluding all but northernmost Bucks County and the eastern half of Montgomery County
484	1999	610	484/610/835	Southeastern Pennsylvania outside Philadelphia, including the Lehigh Valley, but excluding all but northernmost Bucks County and the eastern half of Montgomery County
835	2022	610/484	484/610/835	Southeastern Pennsylvania outside Philadelphia, including the Lehigh Valley, but excluding all but northernmost Bucks County and the eastern half of Montgomery County
412	1947	–	412/878	Pittsburgh and its immediately surrounding areas in Allegheny County
724	1998	412	724/878	Western Pennsylvania, surrounding 412
878	2001	412	412/878	Western Pennsylvania, NPA 412 and 724
878	2001	724	724/878	Western Pennsylvania, NPA 412 and 724
717	1947	–	223/717	South Central Pennsylvania, including Harrisburg, Lancaster, and York.
223	2017	717	223/717	South Central Pennsylvania, including Harrisburg, Lancaster, and York.
570	1998	717	272/570	Northeastern Pennsylvania, including Scranton and Wilkes-Barre
272	2013	570	272/570	Northeastern Pennsylvania, including Scranton and Wilkes-Barre
814	1947	–	582/814	Northwestern and central Pennsylvania, from Bedford County to Centre County, including the city of Erie
582	2021	814	582/814	Northwestern and central Pennsylvania, from Bedford County to Centre County, including the city of Erie

== See also ==
- List of North American Numbering Plan area codes
- Original North American area codes
