= Clemens Heights, Lexington =

Clemens Heights
- Neighborhood of Lexington, Kentucky
- Interactive map of Clemens Heights
- Coordinates: 37.988°N 84.578°W
- Country: United States
- State: Kentucky
- County: Fayette
- City: Lexington

Area
  - Total: 0.104 sq mi (0.27 km^{2})
  - Water: 0 sq mi (0.0 km^{2})

Population (2000)
  - Total: 213
  - Density: 2,047/sq mi (790/km^{2})
- Time zone: UTC-5 (Eastern (EST))
  - Summer (DST): UTC-4 (EDT)
- ZIP code: 40514
- Area code: 859

Clemens Heights is a neighborhood in southwestern Lexington, Kentucky, United States. Its streets are all named after things associated with Mark Twain, whose real name was Samuel Clemens. Its boundaries are Old Higbee Mill Road to the north, Clemens Drive and Carevares Drive to the east, Copper Run Boulevard to the south, and Dogwood Park to the west.

== Neighborhood statistics ==
- Area: 0.104 square miles (0.27 km^{2})
- Population: 213
- Population density: 2,047 people per square mile
- Median household income (2010): $82,714
