= Area code 878 =

Area code in Southwestern Pennsylvania

Coordinates: 40.027°N 79.914°W

Pennsylvania (blue) with numbering plan area 878 shown in red.

Area code 878 is an area code in the North American Numbering Plan for southwestern Pennsylvania, centered in Pittsburgh. It forms an overlay complex with two distinct numbering plan areas, 412 in Pittsburgh and some suburban areas and 724 in an area surrounding 412 in the southwestern corner of the state. Area code 878 was activated on August 17, 2001.

== History ==
Area code 412 had served southwestern Pennsylvania for 41 years, since 1947, before area code 724 was created for most of the 412 territory outside of Pittsburgh in 1998. Bell Atlantic (now part of Verizon), the main telephone provider in the area, wanted to implement 724 as an overlay to spare residents and businesses the burden of changing their telephone numbers. However, overlays were still a new concept at the time, and met with considerable resistance due to the need for ten-digit dialing. Thus, the relief plan was changed to a geographic area code split. Within two years, however, both 412 and 724 were in jeopardy of exhaustion. Overlays had gained more acceptance by then, so 878 was implemented as an overlay. It was activated on August 17, 2001.

Although ten-digit dialing has been mandatory in southwestern Pennsylvania since 2001, no 878 numbers were assigned for more than a decade due to number conservation procedures implemented in both Pittsburgh and the suburbs. On February 15, 2013, the Pennsylvania Public Utility Commission announced it would start to issue 878 numbers in the 724 territory sometime within the next year, as 724 was nearly exhausted. The first 878 numbers were assigned in April 2013, nearly 12 years after the overlay was activated.

On September 15, 2015, the first 878 central office prefix (999) was assigned in the 412 territory.

As of February 2020, Verizon is issuing 878 telephone numbers in the 412 territory.

== See also ==
- List of Pennsylvania area codes

Pennsylvania area codes: 215/267/445, 412, 570/272, 610/484/835, 717/223, 724, 814/582, 878
	North: 814	
West: 304/681, 330/234, 440/436	412/878 and 724/878	East: 814
	South: 304/681	
Ohio area codes: 216, 330/234, 419/567, 440/436, 513/283, 614/380, 740/220, 937/326
West Virginia area codes: 304/681
