= Zandale, Lexington =

Zandale
- Neighborhood of Lexington, Kentucky
- Interactive map of Zandale
- Coordinates: 38.005°N 84.513°W
- Country: United States
- State: Kentucky
- County: Fayette
- City: Lexington

Area
  - Total: .193 sq mi (0.50 km^{2})
  - Water: 0 sq mi (0.0 km^{2})

Population (2000)
  - Total: 799
  - Density: 4,136/sq mi (1,597/km^{2})
- Time zone: UTC-5 (Eastern (EST))
  - Summer (DST): UTC-4 (EDT)
- ZIP code: 40502, 40503
- Area code: 859

Zandale is a neighborhood in southeastern Lexington, Kentucky, United States. Its boundaries are Nicholasville Road to the west, Zandale Drive to the north, Bellefonte Drive to the east, and a combination of Larkin Road, Heather Way, Melbourne Way, and Lowry Lane to the south.

== Neighborhood statistics ==
- Area: 0.193 square miles (0.50 km^{2})
- Population: 799
- Population density: 4,136 people per square mile
- Median household income (2010): $35,712
