= Area code 724 =

Area code in western Pennsylvania

Coordinates: 40.052°N 79.826°W

Pennsylvania (blue) with numbering plan area 724 shown in red.

Area code 724 is a telephone area code in the North American Numbering Plan for the Commonwealth of Pennsylvania in western and southwestern Pennsylvania, including a large portion of the Pittsburgh metropolitan area. It was created in an area code split of area code 412 on February 1, 1998, which made the 412 numbering plan area (NPA) an enclave for the city, with 724 surrounding 412. In 2001, area codes 412 and 724 were overlaid with area code 878, so that the entire southwestern corner of Pennsylvania is served by area code 878.

== History ==
In 1947, area code 412 was assigned as one of 86 original North American area codes to a numbering plan area that comprised the entire southwestern corner of Pennsylvania.

The regional carrier Bell Atlantic wanted to implement area code 724 as an overlay complex with 412 at a time when overlays were still a new concept, and were met with resistance because of the requirement for ten-digit dialing. As a result, 724 was implemented by assigning nearly all of the 412 territory outside Allegheny County with the new area code. This created an area code enclave in the city of Pittsburgh.

Within only two years, both 724 and 412 were nearing exhaustion due to rapid growth of telecommunication services in the Pittsburgh area from proliferation of cell phones and pagers. By this time, overlays had gained more acceptance, and area code 878 was implemented as an overlay complex with both the 412 and 724 territories on August 17, 2001, after rationing of central office prefixes ended. Since that date, ten-digit dialing has been mandatory in southwestern Pennsylvania.

Telephone number conserving practices mitigated exhaustion of area codes 724 and 412 until April, 2013. The first 878 numbers were issued in April 2013, after 724 central office codes were exhausted. The first 878 numbers in the 412 territory were issued a few years later.

== Service area ==
Major locations in the numbering plan area are: Beaver, Butler, Cranberry Township, Ellwood City, Greensburg, Hermitage, Imperial, Indiana, Kittanning, Latrobe, New Castle, North Huntingdon, Oakdale, Sharon, Uniontown, Washington, Waynesburg, & Wexford.

Area code 724 serves parts of fourteen counties in Pennsylvania.

- Allegheny County (northern, eastern, and western edges)
- Armstrong County (all except northeast portion)
- Beaver County
- Butler County
- Clarion County (portions of west)
- Crawford County (extreme southwestern portion only)
- Fayette County
- Greene County
- Indiana County (all except portions of east)
- Lawrence County
- Mercer County (all except northeastern portion)
- Venango County (southeastern portion only)
- Washington County
- Westmoreland County (all except portion in extreme northeast)

Pennsylvania area codes: 215/267/445, 412, 570/272, 610/484/835, 717/223, 724, 814/582, 878
| | North: 814/582 | |
| West: 304/681, 330/234, 440/436 | 724/878; Surrounds 412/878 | East: 814/582 |
| | South: 304/681 | |
Ohio area codes: 216, 330/234, 419/567, 440/436, 513/283, 614/380, 740/220, 937/326
West Virginia area codes: 304/681
