= List of Ohio area codes =

The numbering plan areas (blue) and area codes of Ohio

Area code	Year created	Parent NPA	Overlay	Numbering plan area
216	1947	–	–	Cleveland
330	1996	216	234/330	Akron, Canton, Youngstown, and Warren
234	2000	330	234/330	Akron, Canton, Youngstown, and Warren
440	1997	216	436/440	Part of Northeast Ohio including parts of the Cleveland rate center
436	2024	440	436/440	Part of Northeast Ohio including parts of the Cleveland rate center
419	1947	–	419/567	Northwest and north central Ohio including Toledo, Sandusky, and Ashland
567	2002	419	419/567	Northwest and north central Ohio including Toledo, Sandusky, and Ashland
513	1947	–	283/513	Southwest Ohio including Cincinnati
283	2023	513	283/513	Southwest Ohio including Cincinnati
937	1996	513	326/937	Southwestern part of Ohio including Dayton, Springfield
326	2020	937	326/937	Southwestern part of Ohio including Dayton, Springfield
614	1947	–	380/614	Columbus
380	2016	614	380/614	Columbus
740	1997	614	220/740	Central and southeastern Ohio except Columbus
220	2015	740	220/740	Central and southeastern Ohio except Columbus
