= Area codes 570 and 272 =

Northeast Pennsylvania area codes

Coordinates: 41.418°N 76.113°W

Pennsylvania (blue) with numbering plan area 570 shown in red.

Area codes 570 and 272 are telephone area codes in the North American Numbering Plan (NANP) for the northeast quadrant of the U.S. state of Pennsylvania. The numbering plan area (NPA) includes the cities or towns of Scranton, Wilkes-Barre, Williamsport, Stroudsburg, East Stroudsburg, Pittston, Carbondale, Hazleton, Clarks Summit, Towanda, Bloomsburg, Sayre, Tunkhannock, Berwick, Milford, Montrose, Honesdale, Pocono Pines, Nanticoke, Tamaqua, Shavertown, Dallas, Mahanoy City, Sunbury, Jim Thorpe, and extends as far south as Pottsville and as far west as Lock Haven.

Area code 570 was created in 1998 in a split of area code 717, one of the original North American area codes. In 2013, the numbering plan area received a second area code, 272, creating an overlay complex, which required ten-digit dialing for the area.

== History ==
When the American Telephone and Telegraph Company (AT&T) organized the telephone networks of North America with a universal telephone numbering plan in 1947, Pennsylvania was divided into four numbering plan areas, identified by area codes 215, 412, 717, and 814, respectively. Area code 717 was assigned to the eastern half of Pennsylvania, but excluding the Delaware and Lehigh Valleys.

Area code 570 was created when the numbering plan area 717 was divided on December 5, 1998. It was the first new Pennsylvania area code created outside Philadelphia and Pittsburgh since the implementation of the area code system.

In 2009, North American Numbering Plan Administrator (NANPA) projections indicated that 570 would exhaust its central office prefixes in the third quarter of 2011. The Pennsylvania Public Utility Commission (PUC) considered an overlay complex and three options of dividing the area. Two of the splits would have left Scranton and Wilkes-Barre, the two largest cities with the existing area code. On July 15, 2010, the PUC decided that the new area code, 272, would be implemented as an overlay. The area code entered service on October 21, 2013, after ten-digit dialing had become mandatory in northeastern Pennsylvania on September 21, 2013.

== Service area ==
=== Counties ===
Numbering plan area 570/272 includes all or parts of the following counties.

- Bradford County
- Carbon County
- Centre County
- Clinton County
- Columbia County
- Dauphin County
- Juniata County
- Lackawanna County
- Luzerne County
- Lycoming County
- Monroe County
- Montour County
- Northampton County
- Northumberland County
- Pike County
- Potter County
- Schuylkill County
- Snyder County
- Susquehanna County
- Sullivan County
- Tioga County
- Union County
- Wayne County
- Wyoming County

=== Municipalities ===
- Avoca
- Berwick
- Brodheadsville
- Carbondale
- Clarks Summit
- Dallas
- Drums
- Dunmore
- East Stroudsburg
- Elysburg
- Frackville
- Freeland
- Gouldsboro
- Great Bend
- Hallstead
- Hazleton
- Honesdale
- Jim Thorpe
- Jessup
- Kingston
- Lake Wallenpaupack
- Lansford
- Mahanoy City
- Milford
- Montoursville
- Moscow
- Mount Pocono
- Mountain Top
- Nanticoke
- Nescopeck
- Nesquehoning
- Orwigsburg
- Pine Grove
- Pittston
- Plains
- Portland
- Pottsville
- Sayre
- Scranton
- Shamokin
- Shenandoah
- Stroudsburg
- Sunbury
- Susquehanna Depot
- Tamaqua
- Tannersville
- Taylor
- Tobyhanna
- Towanda
- Tunkhannock
- Weatherly
- West Hazleton
- Wilkes-Barre
- Williamsport

== See also ==
- List of Pennsylvania area codes
- List of North American Numbering Plan area codes

Pennsylvania area codes: 215/267/445, 412, 570/272, 610/484/835, 717/223, 724, 814/582, 878
| | North: 607 | |
| West: 582/814 | 272/570 | East: 329/845, 862/973, 908 |
| | South: 484/610, 717/223 | |
New Jersey area codes: 201/551, 609/640, 732/848, 856, 908, 852/973
New York area codes: 212/332/646, 315/680, 363/516, 518/838, 585, 607, 631/934, 624/716, 347/718/929, 329/845, 914, 917
