= Area codes 513 and 283 =

Area code in southwest Ohio, US

Coordinates: 39°15′N 84°30′W

The numbering plan areas (blue) and area codes of Ohio

Area codes 513 and 283 are telephone area codes in the North American Numbering Plan (NANP) for the southwest of the U.S. state of Ohio, including Cincinnati and surrounding cities, such as Forest Park, Hamilton, Lebanon, West Chester, Mason, Maineville, Middletown, Milford, Norwood, Oxford, Harrison, Cleves, Miamitown and Trenton.

== History ==
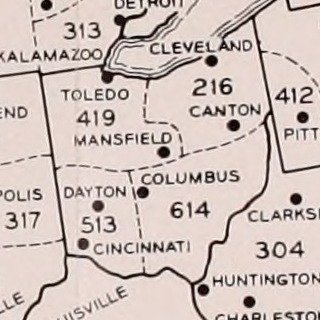
The four original numbering plan areas of Ohio

The first nationwide telephone numbering plan of 1947 divided telecommunications services in Ohio into four numbering plan areas (NPAs), one for each quadrant of the state. AT&T assigned area code 513 to the southwestern quadrant, which included Cincinnati and Dayton.

Due to the proliferation of cell phones and pagers in the 1990s, the numbering plan area had to be split in 1996 to provide more central office prefixes and telephone numbers. The eastern and northern portions, including Dayton, received area code 937. This made 513 largely coextensive with the Cincinnati metropolitan area, though a few outer eastern suburbs transferred to 937.

In 2000, area code 283 was reserved as an overlay code for numbering plan area 513. Although permissive dialing began on January 15, 2001, the implementation was suspended, because of the economic downturn and the return of telephone numbers as a result of the abandonment of service by competitive local telephone companies. Projections showed no need for an overlay code in Cincinnati until at least 2023.

Prior to October 2021, area code 513 had telephone numbers assigned for the central office code 988. In 2020, 988 was designated nationwide as a dialing code for the National Suicide Prevention Lifeline, which created a conflict for exchanges that permit seven-digit dialing. This area code, along with the neighboring area code 859, therefore transitioned to ten-digit dialing on October 24, 2021.

As of 2022, 195 (32.4%) of the 602 forecasted number blocks (of 1,000 each) for area code 513 had been assigned. NANP projections indicated exhaustion of central office prefixes in 513 by the fourth quarter of 2023. For relief, on December 15, 2021, the Public Utilities Commission of Ohio approved an all-service overlay complex for the numbering plan area with the new area code 283. Area code 283 became available to carriers on April 28, 2023, after they exhausted any remaining blocks in the 513 area code.

As of April 2023, the two area codes combined are projected to avoid exhaustion for the foreseeable future.

== See also ==
- List of Ohio area codes
- List of North American Numbering Plan area codes

Ohio area codes: 216, 330/234, 419/567, 440/436, 513/283, 614/380, 740/220, 937/326
	North: 937/326	
West: 812/930, 765	513/283	East: 937/326
	South: 859, 606	
Indiana area codes: 219, 260, 317/463, 574, 765, 812/930
Kentucky area codes: 270/364, 502, 606, 859
