= Area codes 718, 347, 929, and 465 =

Area codes in New York City

Coordinates: 40.72°N 73.87°W

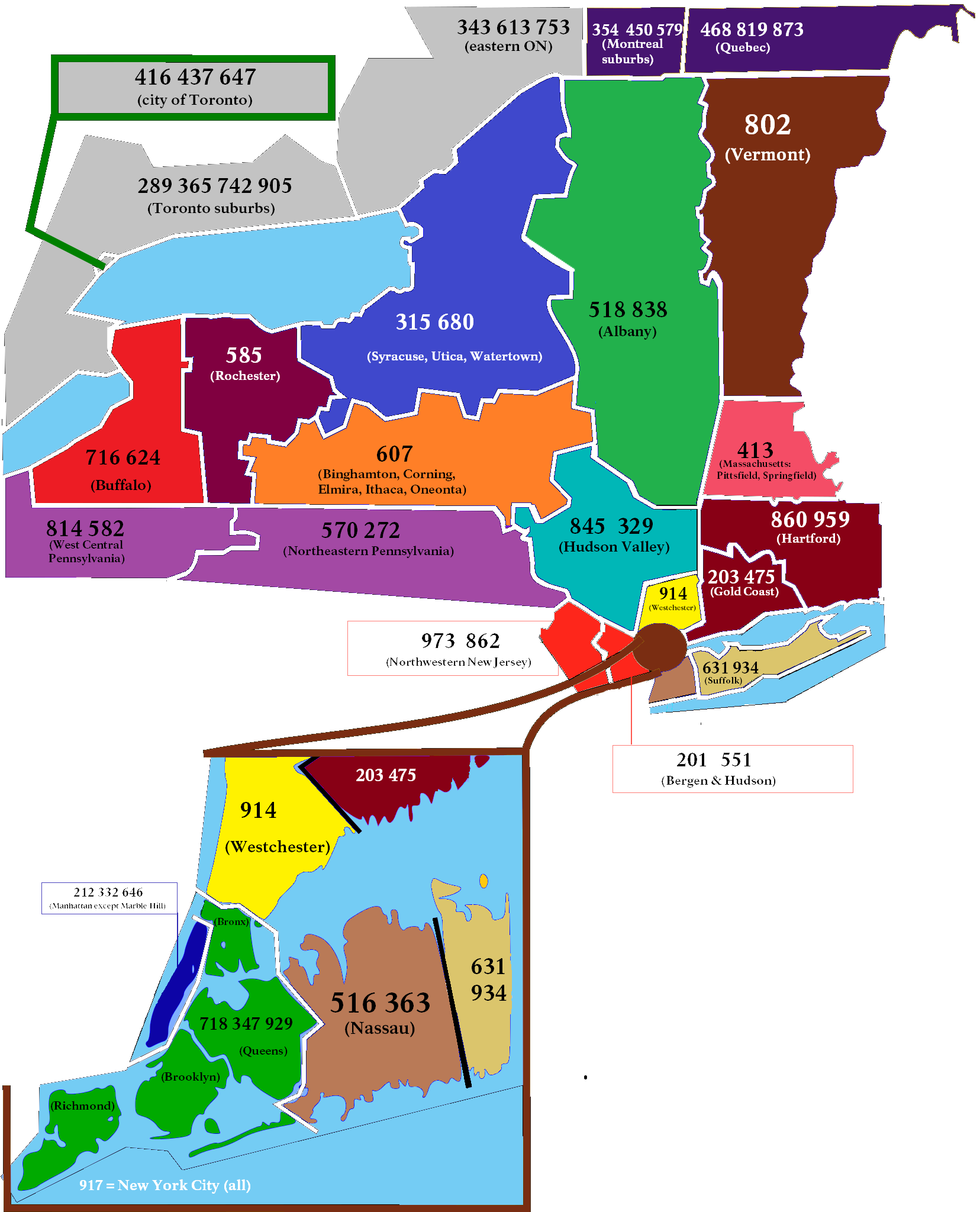
Area codes in New York state in 2024; area codes 718, 347 and 929 highlighted in bright green

Area codes 718, 347, 929, and 465 are the telephone area codes in the North American Numbering Plan (NANP) for the New York City boroughs of the Bronx, Brooklyn, Queens, and Staten Island, as well as the Marble Hill section of Manhattan. They are part of a larger overlay complex with area code 917 which comprises all of New York City.

Area code 718 was created in the first area code split of New York City's area code 212 in 1984. Area codes 347 and 929 were added in 1999 and 2011, respectively. Area code 465 began to overlay the numbering plan area on June 18, 2026. This marks New York state's first area code beginning with a 4.

== History ==
For the first 37 years after the establishment of the first nationwide telephone numbering plan in 1947, all of New York City was a single numbering plan area (NPA), area code 212. In 1984, New York Telephone asked the New York Public Service Commission to divide New York City into multiple numbering plan areas to "prevent an impending exhaustion of telephone numbers." On February 1, 1984, the commission voted to assign Brooklyn, Queens, and Staten Island with a new area code, while restricting 212 to Manhattan and the Bronx. The announcement of the impending split triggered protests and threats of legal action from local officials and lawmakers representing the outer boroughs. Despite this, New York Telephone implemented the new area code 718 on September 1, 1984. The split divided the city's three million telephone subscribers roughly into equal parts. Permissive dialing of 212 continued across New York City until January 1, 1985.

On July 1, 1992, the Bronx and the neighborhood of Marble Hill, Manhattan were also split from numbering plan area 212, and were added to 718. A permissive dialing period for using either area code 212 or 718 in the affected area lasted until May 16, 1993.

In December 1998, area code 347 was approved as an overlay code to area code 718. Area code 347 became effective on October 1, 1999. Mandatory ten-digit dialing for the 718/347 numbering plan area was required to be implemented by April 15, 2000. In the year after the 347 introduction, dialing errors by omitting the prefix digit 1 caused subscribers with numbers 718-347-XXXX receiving calls to the new area code.

On December 16, 2009, the New York Public Service Commission approved an additional overlay code for the 718/347 numbering plan area. On January 22, 2010, NeuStar announced another overlay code (929) for the 718 and 347 area codes. Area code 929 became effective on April 16, 2011. This had the effect of assigning 23.4 million numbers to an area of 6.7 million people.

In April 2024, exhaustion of central office codes for the 347/718/917/929 overlay was projected for the last quarter of 2026, but in September 2025 this was extended to the third quarter of 2027 due to decreasing demand for new central office code assignments.

In mitigation planning, the New York Public Service Commission decided, after a public hearing in October 2024, to install an additional area code to the overlay complex. Upon the approval by the New York Public Service Commission of an all-service distributed overlay on January 24, 2025, area code 465 was scheduled for an in-service date of June 18, 2026.

Area code 917 overlays area codes 718, 347, and 929, as well as area codes 212, 646, and 332 in Manhattan.

== Marble Hill ==
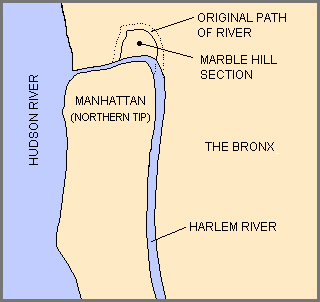
Marble Hill, a neighborhood of the borough of Manhattan, is physically located on the U.S. mainland, adjacent to the Bronx.

Despite being legally a part of the borough of Manhattan, per the Greater New York Charter of 1897, the neighborhood of Marble Hill is excluded from the Manhattan numbering plan areas 212, 646, and 332, instead using the 718, 347, and 929 area codes. It used to be attached to Manhattan Island. After the Harlem River Ship Canal was built in 1895, Marble Hill was separated from Manhattan Island by water. Soon after, the Spuyten Duyvil Creek was filled in with landfill, physically connecting Marble Hill to the Bronx.

When the 718 numbering plan area was extended to the Bronx, Marble Hill residents unsuccessfully fought to retain area code 212. Marble Hill's wire center is located in the Bronx and rerouting the trunks would have been too expensive for New York Telephone.

== In popular culture ==
The 718 area code was celebrated in the 1998 2 Skinnee J's song "718," in which the rappers tell of people moving from Manhattan (212) to other boroughs (718) for lower rent.

Area codes 212 and 718 are included in the 2001 song "Area Codes" as two of the many locations where rapper Ludacris has "hoes."

A telephone number in area code 347 appears as "Call 489-4608, and I'll be here" in the lyrics of "Diary," a track on the album The Diary of Alicia Keys.

In 2023, as part of the marketing for the then-upcoming release of The Super Mario Bros. Movie, a telephone number in area code 929 was created to call or text. When called, the line would play a pre-recorded message instructing callers to send a text message to that number. A reply contained a link where subscribers could sign up for updates related to the movie.

== See also ==
- List of New York area codes
- List of North American Numbering Plan area codes

New York area codes: 212/332/646, 315/680, 363/516, 518/838, 585, 607, 631/934, 624/716, 347/718/929, 329/845, 914, 917
	North: 914, 845, 203/475	
West: 212/646/332/917, 201/551, 908, 862/973	347/718/929/465, 917	East: 516, 631/934
	South: 212/646/332/917, 732/848, Atlantic Ocean	
New Jersey area codes: 201/551, 609/640, 732/848, 856, 908, 852/973
Connecticut area codes: 203/475, 860/959
