= Area code 914 =

Area code of Westchester County, New York

Coordinates: 41.10°N 73.79°W

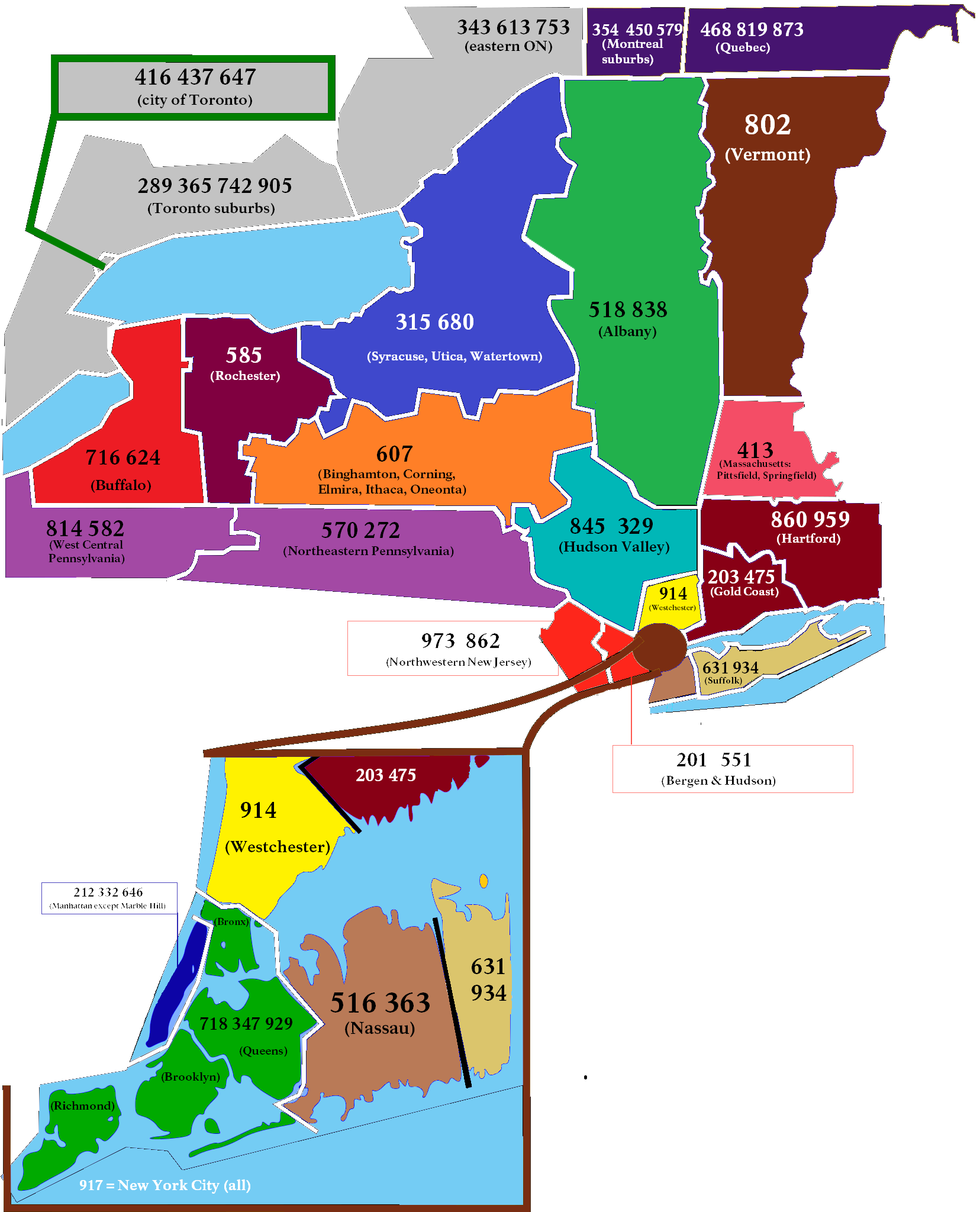
Area codes in New York state; area code 914 highlighted in yellow

Area code 914 is the telephone area code in the North American Numbering Plan (NANP) for Westchester County, New York. It was designated in 1947 as one of the first 86 area codes for a continental telephone numbering plan.

== History ==
Area code 914 was one of the first area codes announced when the American Telephone and Telegraph Company (AT&T) divided North America into a system of numbering plan areas (NPAs) to facilitate automated long-distance telephony. The code was assigned to a numbering plan area comprising Delaware, Dutchess, Nassau, Orange, Putnam, Rockland, Suffolk, Sullivan, Ulster, and Westchester counties, an area largely coextensive with the New York state portion of the New York metropolitan area, excluding New York City, which received area code 212. In 1951, Long Island (Nassau and Suffolk counties) received area code 516 in a split of 914.

This configuration remained for 49 years. By the end of the 1990s, the increasing demand for cell phones and Internet dial-up connections caused concerns for exhaustion of the numbering pool. In mitigation, numbering plan area 914 was reduced to Westchester County on June 5, 2000. The remainder was assigned the new area code 845. Area code 914 was retained by all cellphones in use in the plan area before the split.

Prior to October 2021, area code 914 had telephone numbers assigned for the central office code 988. In 2020, 988 was designated nationwide as a dialing code for the National Suicide Prevention Lifeline, which created a conflict for exchanges that permit seven-digit dialing. This area code was therefore scheduled to transition to ten-digit dialing by October 24, 2021. This required ten-digit dialing in the eastern portion of New York; Westchester had been the only jurisdiction in that part of the state that had not been overlaid.

== See also ==
- List of New York area codes
- List of North American Numbering Plan area codes

New York area codes: 212/332/646, 315/680, 363/516, 518/838, 585, 607, 631/934, 624/716, 347/718/929, 329/845, 914, 917
	North: 845/329	
West: 201/551, 845/329	Area code 914	East: 203/475
	South: 718/347/929, 917	
Connecticut area codes: 203/475, 860/959
New Jersey area codes: 201/551, 609/640, 732/848, 856, 908, 852/973
