= Area codes 614 and 380 =

Area codes for Columbus, Ohio, US

Coordinates: 40°N 83°W

The numbering plan areas (blue) and area codes of Ohio

Area codes 614 and 380 are telephone area codes in the North American Numbering Plan (NANP) for all or part of four counties in central Ohio, surrounding and including the state capital of Columbus. Area code 614 is one of the original area codes assigned for Ohio in 1947, while area code 380 is an overlay code covering the same territory.

== History ==
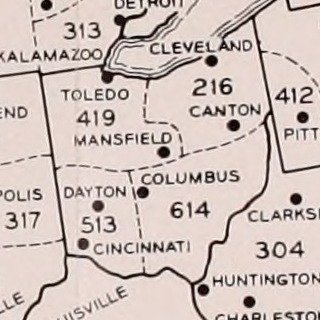
The four original numbering plan areas of Ohio

The first nationwide telephone numbering plan of 1947 divided telecommunication services in Ohio into four numbering plan areas (NPAs), one for each quadrant of the state. Area code 614 was assigned to the southeastern quadrant, from Columbus to the Ohio River along the West Virginia border, stretching as far north as Stratton.

Despite central Ohio's growth in the second half of the 20th century, this configuration remained in place for 51 years. In 1998, nearly all of the southern portion of the old 614 territory was split into the new area code 740. Ameritech, at that time the predominant incumbent local exchange carrier (ILEC), had proposed a split of 614 which generally would have seen Franklin, Delaware and Marion counties–the inner ring of the Columbus area–retaining 614, with the rest of the Columbus suburbs following the rural portion of the old 614 into the new 740.

A complaint before the Public Utilities Commission of Ohio (PUCO) claiming unequal treatment of the suburban counties was brought by Granville attorney J. Drew McFarland, later joined by the Village of Granville, Licking and Fairfield counties and others, wishing for an overlay area code. The PUCO instead reduced the 614 footprint to Columbus itself (which is mostly in Franklin County, with portions spilling into Delaware and Fairfield counties) and Franklin County. A subsequent appeal made slight variations that allowed all of Dublin and Westerville to retain 614 (both cities are mostly in Franklin County, but spill into neighboring counties) and most of Pickerington (which is mostly in Fairfield County with a sliver in Franklin) to remain in 614 as well. The case represented the first time nationally that an ILEC's plan was substantially modified by consumer action. The reconfigured 614 now comprised all of Franklin County and portions of Delaware, Fairfield and Union counties.

With 614 reduced to be all but synonymous with Columbus, it appears on some T-shirt designs that use 614 as an abbreviation or short form to identify the city.

In 2001, it was planned to overlay area code 614 with area code 380, in anticipation of exhaustion. However, the anticipated growth did not materialize and number pooling replaced the proposal. On January 14, 2015 the PUCO instructed the telecommunications industry to finally implement the new area code on February 27, 2016. Ten-digit local dialing has been required since January 30, 2016.

== See also ==
- List of Ohio area codes
- List of North American Numbering Plan area codes

Ohio area codes: 216, 330/234, 419/567, 440/436, 513/283, 614/380, 740/220, 937/326
	North: 740/220	
West: 740/220, 937/326	614/380	East: 740/220
	South: 740/220	
