= Area codes 937 and 326 =

Area codes for Dayton and part of southwestern Ohio, United States

Coordinates: 39°55′20.3″N 83°49′35.4″W

The numbering plan areas (blue) and area codes of Ohio

Area codes 937 and 326 are telephone area codes in the North American Numbering Plan (NANP) assigned to a numbering plan area (NPA) that encompasses much of the southwestern part of the U.S. state of Ohio, including Dayton and Springfield. Area code 937 was established in September 1996, in a split of area code 513. Area code 326 was added to the numbering plan area to form an overlay complex in March 2020.

== History ==
Area code 937 was created in a split of Ohio's original NPA for the southwestern part of the state (area code 513) on September 28, 1996. At the time, literature promoting the new area code took advantage of the fact that the digits of 937 spell out "YES" on a standard telephone keypad.

As of April 2018, projections by the North American Numbering Plan Administrator expected that telephone exchanges ("central office codes") would be exhausted for area code 937 by the third quarter of 2020. For mitigation, on July 3, 2018, area code 326 was planned to overlay the 937 area. The area code translates to DAO as in "DAyton, Ohio", on the alphanumeric dial pad. Beginning on August 10, 2019, subscribers were encouraged to practice ten-digit dialing for local calls within the area code. On February 8, 2020, traditional seven-digit dialing ended, and area code 326 was activated a month later.

== Service area ==
The area codes serve Dayton, its metropolitan area, Springfield, public (non-Defense Switched Network) communications at Wright-Patterson Air Force Base, a few outer eastern suburbs of Cincinnati, and most of southwest Ohio north and east of the Cincinnati metropolitan area.

Communities served with a 2019 population greater than 10,000, and those that are county seats, include Beavercreek, Bellefontaine, Centerville, Clayton, Dayton, Eaton, Englewood, Fairborn, Franklin, Georgetown, Greenville, Hillsboro, Huber Heights, Kettering, Marysville, Miamisburg, Piqua, Riverside, Sidney, Springboro, Springfield, Tipp City, Trotwood, Troy, Urbana, Vandalia, West Carrollton, West Union, Wilmington and Xenia.

Counties comprising the numbering plan area include all or parts of Adams, Brown, Champaign, Clark, Clermont, Clinton, Darke, Greene, Hardin, Highland, Logan, Madison, Miami, Montgomery, Preble, Ross, Scioto, Shelby, Union and Warren.

== See also ==
- List of Ohio area codes
- List of North American Numbering Plan area codes

Ohio area codes: 216, 330/234, 419/567, 440/436, 513/283, 614/380, 740/220, 937/326
	North: 419/567	
West: 260, 513/283, 765	937/326	East: 614/380, 740/220
	South: 513/283, 606	
Indiana area codes: 219, 260, 317/463, 574, 765, 812/930
Kentucky area codes: 270/364, 502, 606, 859
