= Area codes 419 and 567 =

Area codes in northwestern Ohio

Coordinates: 41.663938°N 83.555212°W

The numbering plan areas (blue) and area codes of Ohio

Area codes 419 and 567 are telephone area codes in the North American Numbering Plan (NANP) for the northwestern part of the U.S. state of Ohio. The largest city served by these area codes is Toledo (and its suburbs of Holland, Maumee, Northwood, Oregon, Ottawa Hills, Perrysburg, Rossford, Sylvania, Swanton, Waterville, and Whitehouse).

== History ==
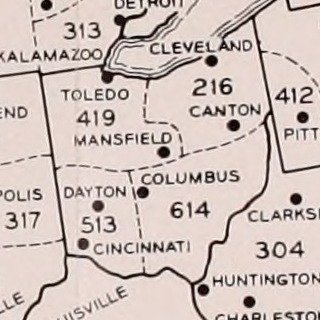
The four original numbering plan areas of Ohio

The first nationwide telephone numbering plan of 1947 divided Ohio into four numbering plan areas (NPAs), roughly forming a quadrant layout for telecommunication services in the state.

Area code 419 was assigned to the northwest quadrant of the state. The overlay area code 567 was created on January 1, 2002. Despite the presence of Toledo, the state's fourth-largest city, 419 had been the last of Ohio's original four numbering plan areas, and one of the few original NPAs not covering an entire state, that had never been split or overlaid. However, because of the choice of an overlay, it is one of the few original NPAs not covering an entire state that still has its original boundaries.

== Service area ==
Other municipalities served by these area codes include Ada, Archbold, Ashland, Bellevue, Bluffton, Bowling Green, Bryan, Bucyrus, Celina, Clyde, Crestline, Defiance, Delphos, Edgerton, Edison, Edon, Elmore, Findlay, Fostoria, Fremont, Galion, Genoa, Kenton, Lima, Mansfield, Montpelier, Mount Gilead, Napoleon, Norwalk, Oak Harbor, Port Clinton, Sandusky, Shelby, St. Marys, Tiffin, Upper Sandusky, Van Wert, Wapakoneta, Wauseon, Willard, and Woodville. Other areas served include the Lake Erie Islands north of Port Clinton and west of Sandusky.

== See also ==
- List of Ohio area codes
- List of North American Numbering Plan area codes

Ohio area codes: 216, 330/234, 419/567, 440/436, 513/283, 614/380, 740/220, 937/326
	North: 517, 734, 226/519/548, Lake Erie	
West: 260	419/567	East: 234/330, 436/440
	South: 220/740, 326/937	
Indiana area codes: 219, 260, 317/463, 574, 765, 812/930
Michigan area codes: 231, 248/947, 269, 313/679, 517, 586, 616, 734, 810, 906, 989
Ontario area codes: 416/437/647/942, 519/226/548/382, 613/343/753, 705/249/683, 807, 905/289/365/742
