= Area codes 610, 484, and 835 =

Telephone area codes in Pennsylvania, United States

Coordinates: 40.086°N 75.357°W

Pennsylvania (blue) with numbering plan area 484 shown in red.

Area codes 610, 484, and 835 are telephone overlay area codes in the North American Numbering Plan (NANP) for the eastern and southeastern regions of Pennsylvania. The numbering plan area (NPA) includes regions to the west of Philadelphia and the cities Allentown, Bethlehem, and Reading. It includes much of the Philadelphia metropolitan area, including almost all of Delaware County, most of the Philadelphia Main Line, and all of the Lehigh Valley.

== History ==
Area code 610 was placed in service on January 8, 1994, in an area code split from numbering plan area 215, which had been the entire southeast quadrant of Pennsylvania since 1947. Permissive dialing of both 215 and 610 continued until the morning of January 7, 1995. It was Pennsylvania's first new area code since the definition of the area code system in 1947.

Three exchanges which would have switched to 610 were instead switched to 717, the area code for most of the eastern half of the state outside of the lower Delaware and Lehigh Valleys. The central office prefixes were 267 at Denver, 445 at Terre Hill, and 484 at Adamstown with 267 being renumbered as 717-336 because 717-267 was already in use at Chambersburg. These exchanges were all served by independent, non-Bell telephone companies, which sought to consolidate their eastern Pennsylvania customers into one area code and would have had to change area codes regardless.

This was intended as a long-term solution, but further growth in the region over the subsequent five years, and the proliferation of cell phones and pagers, spurred the introduction of area code 484 as an overlay for the 610 region on June 5, 1999, along with the introduction of mandatory ten-digit dialing.

In May 2000, area code 835 was established by the Pennsylvania Public Utility Commission as an additional code for the 610/484 overlay and was intended to be implemented in 2001. However, newly developed, more efficient number pooling measures were introduced instead, eliminating the immediate need for the new area code. The Commission formally withdrew plans for the new code on June 23, 2005, although the code remained reserved for later use within Pennsylvania if necessary. Area code 835 was eventually approved by the Public Utility Commission on December 2, 2021. Assignment of central office codes in the new area code began on September 2, 2022.

== Prior usage of 610 for TWX ==
In 1962, AT&T assigned NPA 610 for conversion to dial service of the Teletypewriter Exchange Service in Canada. While Telex II use of area codes was terminated in 1981 in the U.S. by Western Union, Canadian use of 610 continued until October 31, 1993, when it was exchanged in a flash cut for area code 600 for non-geographic applications.

== Service area ==
The following counties and municipalities are in the numbering plan area:

=== Counties ===
- Berks County: The entire county except the extreme western portions (in 717), extreme northern portions (in 570) and the Hereford area, which is served by the Pennsburg exchange in the 215/267 area code.
- Bucks County: The northeastern portion of the county is served by the Coopersburg, Springtown, Riegelsville, Ferndale, Upper Black Eddy, and Uhlerstown exchanges.
- Carbon County: The southern portion of the county is served by 377 Lehighton and 824 and 826 Palmerton exchanges. The western end of the county, including Lansford and Summit Hill, use 610 and 484 for mobile and digital numbers while retaining 570 and 645 for conventional phone numbers.
- Chester County: The entire county except the extreme western portion, which is served by the 717 and 442 Gap exchange.
- Delaware County: The entire county
- Lancaster County: Only the far southeastern portion of the county centered on Christiana. The rest of county uses the 717 area code.
- Lebanon County: Newmanstown is the only Lebanon County municipality to use 610 as its area code, specifically 610-589-XXXX, which is also used by Womelsdorf.
- Lehigh County: The entire county except the southwestern portion, which is served by the Pennsburg exchange in the 215 and 267 overlay.
- Monroe County: The far southwestern portion of the county
- Montgomery County: The southern and western portions of the county. Other areas of the county are served by the 215 and 267 area codes.
- New Castle County, Delaware - A few residences along West Ridge Road and Sterling Avenue in Claymont, Delaware use the 610, 484, and 835 exchange.
- Northampton County: The entire county except the northeastern portions, including Portland and Upper Mount Bethel Township are in the 570 area code.
- Schuylkill County: The southern and eastern fringes of the county, including portions of East Brunswick, West Brunswick, and West Penn Township, are served by the Lehighton, Germansville, and Kempton exchanges. Port Clinton is assigned to 610 and 484; however, the majority of it is in 570 and 272, and even smaller portions, including Tower City, is in 717.

=== Towns and cities ===
- Allentown
- Bethlehem
- Catasauqua
- Chadds Ford
- Chester
- Christiana
- Downingtown
- Easton
- Emmaus
- Exton
- Folsom
- Gap
- Hamburg
- Havertown
- Kennett Square
- Kutztown
- Lansdowne
- Lehighton
- Macungie
- Malvern
- Media
- Newtown Square
- North Catasauqua
- Northampton
- Oxford
- Palmerton
- Paoli
- Pottstown
- Reading
- Shillington
- Sinking Spring
- Upper Darby
- West Chester
- Whitehall Township
- Willistown
- Wind Gap
- Wyomissing

== See also ==
- List of North American Numbering Plan area codes
- List of Pennsylvania area codes

Pennsylvania area codes: 215/267/445, 412, 570/272, 610/484/835, 717/223, 724, 814/582, 878
| | North: 570/272 | |
| West: 717/223 | 484/610/835 | East: 215/267/445, 856, 609/640, 908 |
| | South: 302, 410/443/667, 856 | |
Delaware area codes: 302
Maryland area codes: 301/240/227, 410/443/667
New Jersey area codes: 201/551, 609/640, 732/848, 856, 908, 852/973
