= Area code 216 =

Telephone area code for Cleveland, Ohio

Coordinates: 41°30′N 81°40′W

The numbering plan areas (blue) and area codes of Ohio

Area code 216 is the telephone area code in the North American Numbering Plan (NANP) for the city of Cleveland and most of its inner-ring suburbs in Cuyahoga County of the U.S. state of Ohio. The area code is one of the original North American area codes established in 1947.

== History ==
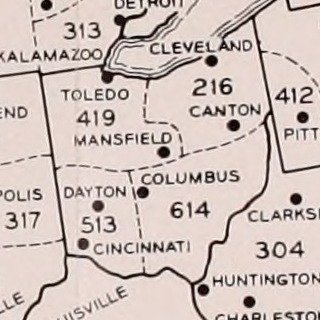
The four original numbering plan areas of Ohio

The first nationwide telephone numbering plan of 1947 divided telecommunications services in Ohio into four numbering plan areas (NPAs), one for each quadrant of the state. Area code 216 was assigned to the northeastern quadrant, comprising the area from Lorain to Youngstown.

In 1996, the southern portion, including Akron, Canton, and Youngstown, received area code 330, while the eastern and western portions were assigned area code 440 in 1997. The boundary between 216 and 440 was drawn in such a way that 440 was barely contiguous; the two portions of 440 were only joined by a small section in the south. The eastern and western portions are currently not contiguous.

Despite comprising a major urban area, 216 has not been overlaid with a second area code (the only area in Ohio where this is the case). Based on projections of 2025, relief will not be needed until 2046.

== Service area ==
- Beachwood
- Bratenahl
- Brook Park
- Brooklyn
- Brooklyn Heights
- Cleveland
- Cleveland Heights
- Cuyahoga Heights
- East Cleveland
- Euclid
- Garfield Heights
- Highland Hills
- Hunting Valley
- Independence
- Lakewood
- Linndale
- Maple Heights
- Middleburg Heights
- Moreland Hills
- Newburgh Heights
- North Olmsted
- North Randall
- Orange
- Parma
- Parma Heights
- Pepper Pike
- Richmond Heights
- Seven Hills
- Shaker Heights
- South Euclid
- University Heights
- Valley View
- Warrensville Heights
- Woodmere

== See also ==
- List of Ohio area codes
- List of North American Numbering Plan area codes

Ohio area codes: 216, 330/234, 419/567, 440/436, 513/283, 614/380, 740/220, 937/326
	North: Lake Erie, 519/226/548	
West: 440/436	216	East: 440/436
	South: 330/234	
Ontario area codes: 416/437/647/942, 519/226/548/382, 613/343/753, 705/249/683, 807, 905/289/365/742
