= Area code 859 =

Area code that serves the city of Lexington and the central portion of Kentucky

Kentucky's numbering plan areas and area codes

Area code 859 is a telephone area code in the North American Numbering Plan (NANP) for the city of Lexington and the central portion of the Commonwealth of Kentucky. It was created in a split of area code 606 in 1999.

== History ==
When the American Telephone and Telegraph Company (AT&T) designed the first nationwide telephone numbering plan, Kentucky was designated as a single numbering plan area (NPA) and assigned the area code 502 in 1947. In a repartitioning of the state in 1954, the eastern half was renumbered with area code 606. In 1999, the western half was assigned area code 270 in 1999.

Area code 859 was created in 1999 in a split of the 606 numbering plan area. On the alpha-numeric telephone keypad, 859 spells UKY, a nod to the University of Kentucky in Lexington.

In area code splits, traditional practice has been that the region with the largest city or most established communities retain the existing area code to minimize disruption to existing businesses and the community. Thus, Lexington and Northern Kentucky might have retained 606. Lexington was by far the largest city in the numbering plan area. Combined, Lexington and Northern Kentucky accounted for two-thirds of the population, along with the great majority of its landlines and cell phones. However, several counties in eastern Kentucky are among the poorest in the nation. The Kentucky Public Service Commission and BellSouth (now part of AT&T), then the region's main carrier, decided to let the rural region retain 606 to spare this area the expense and burden of renumbering.

Prior to October 2021, area code 859 had telephone numbers assigned for the central office code 988. In 2020, 988 was designated nationwide as a dialing code for the National Suicide Prevention Lifeline, which created a conflict for exchanges that permit seven-digit dialing. This area code was therefore scheduled to transition to ten-digit dialing by October 24, 2021.

By 2023 projections, 859 was not expected to exhaust its central office code supply until about 2047.

== Service area ==
By far the largest city in the numbering plan area is Lexington, followed by Northern Kentucky, the Kentucky portion of the Cincinnati metropolitan area. It includes smaller cities and towns such as Nicholasville, Richmond, Danville, Covington, Versailles, Florence, Mount Sterling and Winchester.

The numbering plan area comprises the following Kentucky counties. The boundary closely, but not exactly, tracks county lines.

- Boone County
- Bourbon County
- Boyle County
- Campbell County
- Clark County
- Fayette County (coterminous with the city of Lexington)
- Gallatin County
- Garrard County
- Grant County
- Harrison County
- Jessamine County
- Kenton County
- Madison County
- Mercer County
- Montgomery County
- Nicholas County
- Pendleton County
- Washington County
- Woodford County

== See also ==
- List of Kentucky area codes
- List of North American Numbering Plan area codes

Kentucky area codes: 270/364, 502, 606, 859
	North: 283/513	
West: 502, 812/930	859	East: 606
	South: 270/364	
Indiana area codes: 219, 260, 317/463, 574, 765, 812/930
Ohio area codes: 216, 330/234, 419/567, 440/436, 513/283, 614/380, 740/220, 937/326
