= Public Utilities Commission of Ohio =

The Public Utilities Commission of Ohio (PUCO) is the public utilities commission of the U.S. state of Ohio, charged with the regulation of utility service providers such as those of electricity, natural gas, and telecommunications as well as railroad safety and intrastate hazardous materials transport.

== Background ==
=== Responsibilities ===
The commission is responsible for:

- Enforcement of laws against service deemed unfair or unsafe
- Hearing disputes between utilities and residential, business, and industrial customers, as well as between competing utilities.
- Assuring availability of residential, business, and industrial utility services
- Providing consumers with relevant information about their rights and responsibilities
- Regulating rates for utility services in which there is little to no competition (i.e. electricity and natural gas services)
- Periodically creating and changing Ohio Administrative Code that is related to its mission
- Acting in some manner to relate the relevant Administrative Code to the regulated and deregulated commercial utility activity

Following the move toward deregulation of retail energy during the 1990s, the Ohio legislature set forth provisions for allowing competitive retail energy suppliers, in addition to the main distribution utility companies.

In January 2018, PUCO launched an investigation to make sure benefits from the recently passed federal tax bill flow back to customers.

=== EPA Clean Power Plan ===
In February 2016, the U.S. Supreme Court issued a stay of the U.S. Environmental Protection Agency's "Clean Power Plan" pending judicial review. The plan is a federal program with the goal of decreasing carbon emissions from power plants. To meet its goal, the EPA created targets for reducing carbon dioxide, with the levels varying state to state. Each state must develop its own plan to meet the EPA targets, which begin in 2022.

PUCO has litigated against the Clean Power Plan on the grounds that it violates the Federal Power Act and violates states' rights. Despite the state's opposition to the plan, PUCO said that Ohio is prepared to plan for implementation of new rules and regulations in the event that the plan survives legal challenges (PUCO's Division of Air Pollution Control is responsible for the implementation). PUCO's chairman, Asim Haque, said that the commission analyzed how much the Clean Power Plan would cost Ohio consumers and that "we believe those costs to be hefty."

=== Net metering policy ===
On November 8, 2017, PUCO adopted rules that affected net metering policy. Net metering is the process by which solar homes or businesses sell back to the grid any excess energy they produce.

Ohio Consumers’ Counsel, Interstate Gas Supply, Environment Law & Policy Center, Ohio Environmental Council, Environmental Defense Fund, Natural Resources Defense Council, Vote Solar, One Energy, FirstEnergy, AEP Ohio, and The Dayton Power and Light Company filed petitions either for a rehearing or against one. PUCO decided to have a rehearing on January 10, 2018.

== Commissioners ==
There are five commissioners (one of whom serves as chairman) as well as approximately 320 agency employees. Each commissioner is appointed by the residing governor to a five-year term. Current commissioners, and their original appointers, are:

- Jenifer A. French, Chair (DeWine), through April 2029
- Daniel R. Conway (Kasich), through April 2027
- Dennis P. Deters (DeWine), through April 2031
- Lawrence K. Friedeman (Kasich), through April 2030
- John D. Williams (DeWine), through April 2028
