= Area codes 215, 267, and 445 =

Area codes in southeastern Pennsylvania

Coordinates: 39.990°N 75.154°W

Pennsylvania (blue) with numbering plan area 215 shown in red.

Area codes 215, 267, and 445 are telephone area codes in the North American Numbering Plan (NANP) for Philadelphia and adjacent portions of Bucks and Montgomery counties in the U.S. state of Pennsylvania. Area code 215 was one of the original North American area codes established in 1947, while 267 and 445 are overlay codes for the same numbering plan area (NPA).

== History ==
When the American Telephone and Telegraph Company (AT&T) organized the telephone networks of North American with a universal telephone numbering plan in 1947, Pennsylvania was divided into four numbering plan areas, which received the area codes 215, 412, 717, and 814.

Area code 215 was assigned to the Delaware and Lehigh valleys in southeastern Pennsylvania, including the Philadelphia metropolitan area.

On January 8, 1994, the western and northern portions of the original 215 territory, including Philadelphia's western suburbs, most of Berks County, and the Lehigh Valley, changed to area code 610, while Philadelphia and its northern suburbs retained 215. However, three central offices were moved from 215 to east-central Pennsylvania's 717, namely 267 in Denver, 484 in Adamstown and 445 in Terre Hill, with 215-267 becoming 717-336 because 717-267 was already in use. These exchanges were originally slated to move into 610, but were served by non-Bell telephone companies which sought to consolidate their eastern Pennsylvania customers into one area code.

This was intended as a long-term solution, but within two years 215 was close to exhaustion due to the rapid growth of the Philadelphia area and the proliferation of cell phones and pagers. For relief, area code 267 was established as an overlay on the 215 numbering plan area on July 1, 1997. Local calls across the Delaware/Pennsylvania border required ten-digit dialing.

Area code 445 was first proposed in July 2000 as an overlay code on numbering plan area 215/267. However, these plans were delayed and then rescinded in 2003 by the Pennsylvania Public Utility Commission. The need for new phone numbers in area codes 215/267 was delayed until 2018. Area code 445 was activated as an additional overlay code on February 3, 2018. This assigned 23 million telephone numbers to a service territory of four million people, and 215/267/445 is not projected by the NANP to require relief action until beyond 2050.

== Service area ==
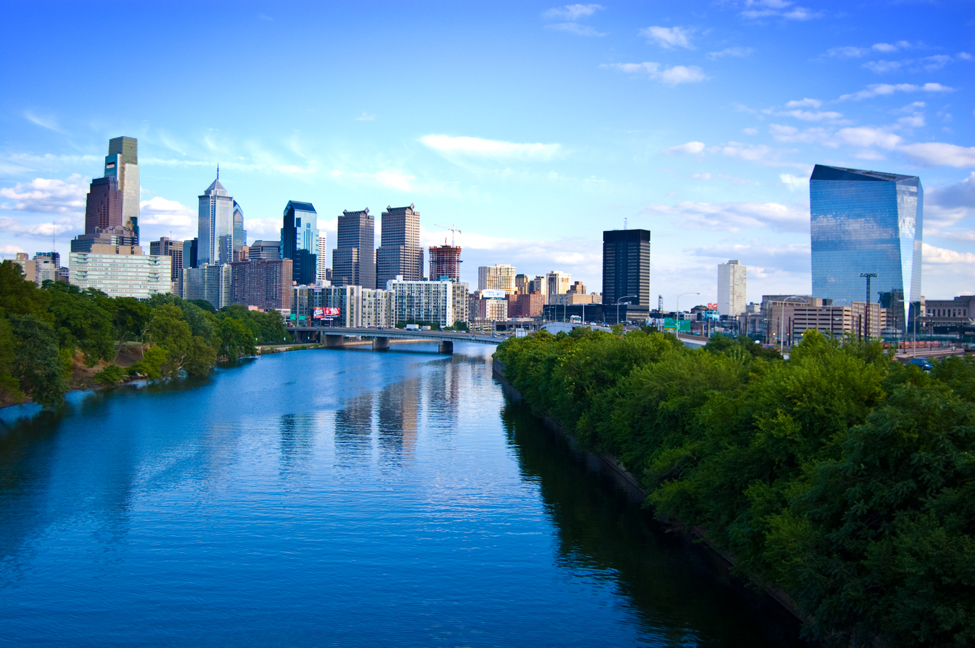
Philadelphia was located in the original numbering plan area 215; 267 was added in 1997 and 445 in 2018.

The service area comprises all or parts of five counties in Pennsylvania.

- Berks County (extreme eastern portion)
- Bucks County (all but northeastern portion, which is served by area codes 610, 484, and 835)
- Lehigh County (extreme southern portion)
- Montgomery County (northern and eastern area, rest of county served by area codes 610, 484, and 835)
- Philadelphia County (all)

Places with over 30,000 inhabitants:

- Abington
- Bensalem
- Bristol
- Cheltenham
- Falls
- Lower Makefield
- Northampton
- Philadelphia
- Warminster

== See also ==
- List of Pennsylvania area codes
- List of NANP area codes

Pennsylvania area codes: 215/267/445, 412, 570/272, 610/484/835, 717/223, 724, 814/582, 878
	North: 484/610/835, 908	
West: 484/610/835	215/267/445	East: 609/640
	South: 856	
New Jersey area codes: 201/551, 609/640, 732/848, 856, 908, 852/973
