= Pennsylvania Public Utility Commission =

Regulatory agency in Pennsylvania

Agency overview
- Preceding agency: Pennsylvania State Railroad Commission Pennsylvania Public Service Commission
- Jurisdiction: State government of Pennsylvania
- Headquarters: 400 North Street, Harrisburg, Pennsylvania 17120
- Agency executives: Stephen M. DeFrank, Chairman; Kimberly Barrow, Vice Chair; John F. Coleman, Jr., Commissioner; Kathryn L. Zerfuss, Commissioner; Ralph V Yanora, Commissioner
- Website: www.puc.pa.gov

Pennsylvania Public Utility Commission (PUC) is the public utility commission in Pennsylvania. It is composed of five commissioners, which are appointed by the governor with the consent of the Pennsylvania State Senate. The PUC oversees public utility and services operations in the commonwealth, in sectors including water, energy, telecommunications, and transportation.

State code requires separation of the five commissioners and an investigatory division.

== History ==
=== 20th century ===
The Pennsylvania Public Utility Commission has roots in the founding of the Pennsylvania State Railroad Commission, which was founded in 1907. In 1913, the railroad commission was replaced with the Pennsylvania Public Service Commission (PSC). In 1937, the passage of Act 43 mandated the replacement of the Public Service Commission with the Public Utility Commission, which was chartered to oversee and regulate all public utilities operating in Pennsylvania.

=== 21st century ===
In June 2006, PUC provided standards for metering of small alternative energy suppliers, including solar and biodigesters. The standards specify how electric distribution companies reimburse small suppliers to the electrical grid.

PUC oversees ordinances for gas exploration and extraction at Marcellus Shale. The commission is responsible for collecting and distributing the impact fee in the state.

In November 2014, the commission granted Uber a two year experimental license to operate throughout Pennsylvania.

In 2014, an annual PUC survey found that more than 23,000 Pennsylvania households without heat.

In November 2018, the commission approved a new policy that clarified rules about how electric power is resold. The policy is part of an effort by the commission to promote investment in electric vehicle charging stations. Existing rules unintentionally limited public charging stations in the way that the electricity was priced and regulated.

== See also ==
- List of Pennsylvania state agencies
