= Area codes 717 and 223 =

Area codes in South Central Pennsylvania

Coordinates: 40.262°N 77.497°W

Pennsylvania (blue) with numbering plan area 717 shown in red.

Area codes 717 and 223 are telephone area codes in the North American Numbering Plan (NANP) for South Central Pennsylvania and the Susquehanna Valley. The numbering plan area (NPA) includes the Harrisburg, Lancaster, and York areas and a considerable portion of Pennsylvania Dutch Country, an area with nearly two million people.

Area code 717 was one of the original North American area codes created in 1947 and area code 223 was added to the modern extent of the numbering plan area in 2017, creating an overlay plan for the area, requiring ten-digit dialing for all calls.

== History ==
When the American Telephone and Telegraph Company (AT&T) organized the telephone networks of North America with a universal telephone numbering plan in 1947, Pennsylvania was divided into four numbering plan areas, which received the area codes 215, 412, 717, and 814. Area code 717 was assigned to the eastern half of the Commonwealth, excluding the Delaware and Lehigh Valleys, which used area code 215. It stretched from the Maryland border to the south to the New Jersey and New York state borders, making it the largest of Pennsylvania's original four plan areas and one of the largest that did not cover an entire state.

Despite the presence of five of the state's largest cities (Harrisburg, Lancaster, York, Scranton, and Wilkes-Barre), this part of Pennsylvania is not as densely populated as the Delaware and Lehigh Valleys. As a result, the 717 numbering plan area remained unchanged for 41 years. For nearly all this time, it was the largest numbering plan area on the Eastern Seaboard. Its western border was relocated slightly eastward in 1994 as part of the split of 215, when a few towns in eastern Lancaster County and western Chester County that were slated to transfer to area code 610 were instead shifted to 717. These areas were served by non-Bell companies who wanted to consolidate their eastern Pennsylvania subscriber base into a single area code.

By the mid-1990s, 717 was facing exhaustion of central office prefixes due to the proliferation of cell phones, pagers, and fax machines, particularly in Harrisburg, Lancaster, York, and Scranton/Wilkes-Barre. On December 5, 1998, the northern portion of the old 717 territory, centered on Scranton, Wilkes-Barre, and Williamsport, received area code 570. As of May 2005, the subscriber number pool of 717 was allocated by 52%.

The Pennsylvania Utility Commission determined in 2010 that 717 would likely exhaust by the second quarter of 2018. Under consideration for relief were overlaying 717 with a second area code, or a split along an east–west boundary. An overlay would have required ten-digit dialing, though all customers with an existing 717 number would have been able to keep it. A split would have preserved seven-digit dialing. Most of those who testified in a public hearing supported an overlay as a cost-effective solution that would have spared customers the expense and burden of changing their numbers. In October 2016, an overlay area code, 223, was approved, to become effective in 2017.

Area code 223 became available for central office code orders on July 22, 2017, with an earliest activation date on September 26, 2017. Since August 26, 2017, 10-digit dialing has been mandatory.

== Service area ==
The numbering plan area comprises parts or all of sixteen counties in Pennsylvania.

- Adams County
- Berks County (portions of west)
- Chester County (extreme western portion)
- Cumberland County
- Dauphin County
- Franklin County
- Fulton County (all except some western portions)
- Huntingdon County (Kishacoquillas Valley and portions of extreme SE only)
- Juniata County
- Lancaster County (all except a portion of its extreme NE)
- Lebanon County (all except a portion of its extreme SE)
- Mifflin County (all except a portion of its extreme SW)
- Perry County
- Schuylkill County (Tower City is the only town assigned the 717 area code; the rest of the county is 570/272, with some portions in 610/484)
- Snyder County (portions of south)
- York County

== See also ==
- List of North American Numbering Plan area codes
- List of Pennsylvania area codes

== General sources ==
- Pennsylvania Public Utility Commission
- North American Numbering Council

Pennsylvania area codes: 215/267/445, 412, 570/272, 610/484/835, 717/223, 724, 814/582, 878
	North: 272/570	
West: 582/614	223/717	East: 484/610
	South: 227/240/301, 410/443/667	
Maryland area codes: 301/240/227, 410/443/667
