= Area code 412 =

Telephone area code for Pittsburgh, Pennsylvania

Coordinates: 40.488°N 79.892°W

Pennsylvania (blue) with numbering plan area 412 shown in red.

Area code 412 is a telephone area code in the North American Numbering Plan (NANP) for the Commonwealth of Pennsylvania. The numbering plan area (NPA) comprises the city of Pittsburgh, most of surrounding Allegheny County, and small portions of Washington and Westmoreland counties. The area code was one of the original North American area codes created in 1947, when it was assigned to the entire southwestern corner of the state. On August 17, 2001, the numbering plan area was converted to an overlay complex with area code 878, which also forms an overlay with area code 724, in the surroundings of the 412 service area.

Area code 412 serves the city of Pittsburgh and inner ring suburbs, whereas area code 724 serves the majority of the Pittsburgh metropolitan region farther out from the city,

== History ==
When the American Telephone and Telegraph Company (AT&T) created the first nationwide telephone numbering plan for the continental United States and Canada in 1947, Pennsylvania was divided into four numbering plan areas. Area code 412 was assigned to the southwestern part of the state, from Butler County to the West Virginia border.

On February 1, 1998, most of southwestern Pennsylvania outside of Allegheny County was split into a new numbering plan area with area code 724. Bell Atlantic, the main telephone provider at the time in Pennsylvania, had preferred to implement 724 as an overlay to spare residents and businesses the burden of changing telephone numbers. However, overlays were still a new concept at the time, and met with resistance because of the need for ten-digit dialing. As a result, 724 was implemented as an area code split, making 412 one of six pairs of doughnut area codes in North America.

This configuration was intended as a long-term solution, but within two years both 412 and 724 experienced high demand for telephone services from the proliferation of cell phones and pagers, so that further relief became necessary. By this time, overlays had gained more acceptance, so area code 878 was implemented as an overlay for both 412 and 724 on August 17, 2001. Although telephone numbers were not assigned for 878 until 2013 (and were only assigned in the 724 area until 2015), ten-digit dialing has been mandatory across southwestern Pennsylvania since 2001.

== Service area ==
The numbering plan area includes Allegheny county, with the exception of its northern edge served by Consolidated Communications, formerly North Pittsburgh Telephone Company, and parts of Washington and Westmoreland counties. It includes the following municipalities: Pittsburgh, Bethel Park, Penn Hills, Plum, Carnegie, West Mifflin, Fox Chapel, Franklin Park, McCandless, McKeesport, Millvale, Monroeville, Mount Lebanon, Mount Oliver, Oakmont, Robinson Township, Ross Township, Sewickley, Shaler Township, South Fayette, Upper Saint Clair, The Borough West View

== See also ==
- List of Pennsylvania area codes

Pennsylvania area codes: 215/267/445, 412, 570/272, 610/484/835, 717/223, 724, 814/582, 878
	North: 724/878	
West: 724/878	412/878	East: 724/878
	South: 724/878	
