= Richard Sullivan =

Richard Sullivan may refer to:

- Richard J. Sullivan (born 1964), judge of the United States Court of Appeals for the Second Circuit
- Richard J. Sullivan (environmentalist), first commissioner of the New Jersey Department of Environmental Protection
- Richard T. Sullivan (died 1981), novelist
- Sir Richard Sullivan, 1st Baronet (1752–1806), British Member of Parliament and writer
- Sir Richard Benjamin Magniac Sullivan, 8th Baronet (1906–1977) of the Sullivan baronets
- Sir Richard Arthur Sullivan, 9th Baronet (born 1931) of the Sullivan baronets
- Rick Sullivan (Richard K. Sullivan, Jr., born 1959), American politician in Massachusetts
- Rip Sullivan (Richard Sullivan, born 1959), American community activist in Virginia

== See also ==
- Richie Sullivan, a co-writer of the song Offshore '97
- Dick Sullivan, British actor of Seekers
- Richard O'Sullivan (disambiguation)
- Frederic Richard Sullivan (1872–1937), English-born film director and actor
