= New Jersey Department of Environmental Protection =

Government agency of the U.S. state of New Jersey

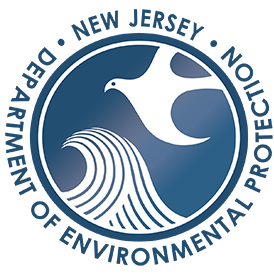
- Seal of the NJDEP

Department overview
- Formed: January 1, 1949; 77 years ago (as Department of Conservation and Economic Development)
- Jurisdiction: Government of New Jersey
- Headquarters: 401 E. State Street, 7th Floor, East Wing, Trenton, New Jersey
- Annual budget: US$1.2 billion (FY2027) (57% federal)
- Department executives: Ed Potosnak, Commissioner; Joseph Seebode, Deputy Commissioner
- Child agencies: New Jersey Division of Fish and Wildlife; New Jersey Division of Parks and Forestry
- Website: nj.gov/dep

The New Jersey Department of Environmental Protection (NJDEP) is a government agency in the U.S. state of New Jersey that is responsible for managing the state's natural resources and addressing issues related to pollution. NJDEP now has a staff of approximately 2,850.

The department was established in its current form on April 22, 1970, America's first official Earth Day, making it the third state in the country to combine its environmental activities into a single, unified agency, with about 1,400 employees in five divisions, charged with responsibility for environmental protection and conservation efforts. Governor William T. Cahill appointed Richard J. Sullivan as the first commissioner.

In December 2017, Catherine McCabe was nominated by New Jersey governor-elect Phil Murphy to serve as Commissioner of the New Jersey Department of Environmental Protection. Shawn M. LaTourette succeeded her in January 2021. Other former commissioners have included Lisa P. Jackson and Bradley M. Campbell.

== Divisions ==
The major goal of the air quality division is to ensure the cleanliness of the air quality by enforcing air-pollutant standards imposed by the federal Environmental Protection Agency.

Water monitoring and standards has the primary responsibilities of closely monitoring the state's fresh, marine, and ground waters, developing surface and ground water quality standards, and characterizing and assessing water quality. The gathered information, data, reports and analysis are used to inform organizations and the public to make better decisions on behalf of water usage.

The land and open space division provides rules and includes information concerning wetlands, coastal, and stream/floodplain encroachment programs.

The site remediation program requires all remediations in the state to proceed under the supervision of a licensed site remediation professional that they may follow the nine requirements set forth at N.J.S.A. 58:10B-1.3b. The goal of this program is to speed up and increase the pace of remediation, thus helping to decrease the threat of future contamination.

A solid and hazardous waste management program is responsible for conducting educational and public relations campaigns on behalf of recycling, although its activities have been reduced since funding cuts in the mid-1990s.

The Division of Parks and Forestry protects state and private lands from wildfire, manages the forests, educates the public, grows trees to maintain and restore forests in rural and urban areas, and preserves the diversity of the trees within the forests.

The Division of Fish and Wildlife works towards protecting and managing the state's fish and wildlife resources.

== Related legislation ==
- 1948: Department of Conservation and Economic Development Act of 1948, P.L. 1948, c. 448
- 1970: Department of Environmental Protection Act of 1970, P.L. 1970, c. 33

== See also ==
- ExxonMobil-New Jersey environmental contamination settlement
- Delaware River Basin Commission
- Highlands Water Protection and Planning Council
- New Jersey Historic Trust
- New Jersey Pinelands Commission
- New Jersey stormwater management rules
- New Jersey Tidelands Resource Council
- Climate change in New Jersey
