= Climate change in New Jersey =

Climate change in the US state of New Jersey

Climate change in New Jersey is of concern due to its effects on the ecosystem, economy, infrastructure, and people of the U.S. state of New Jersey. According to climatology research by the U.S. National Oceanic and Atmospheric Administration, New Jersey has been the fastest-warming state by average air temperature over a 100-year period beginning in the early 20th century, related to global warming.

New Jersey map of Köppen climate classification.

== Temperature ==
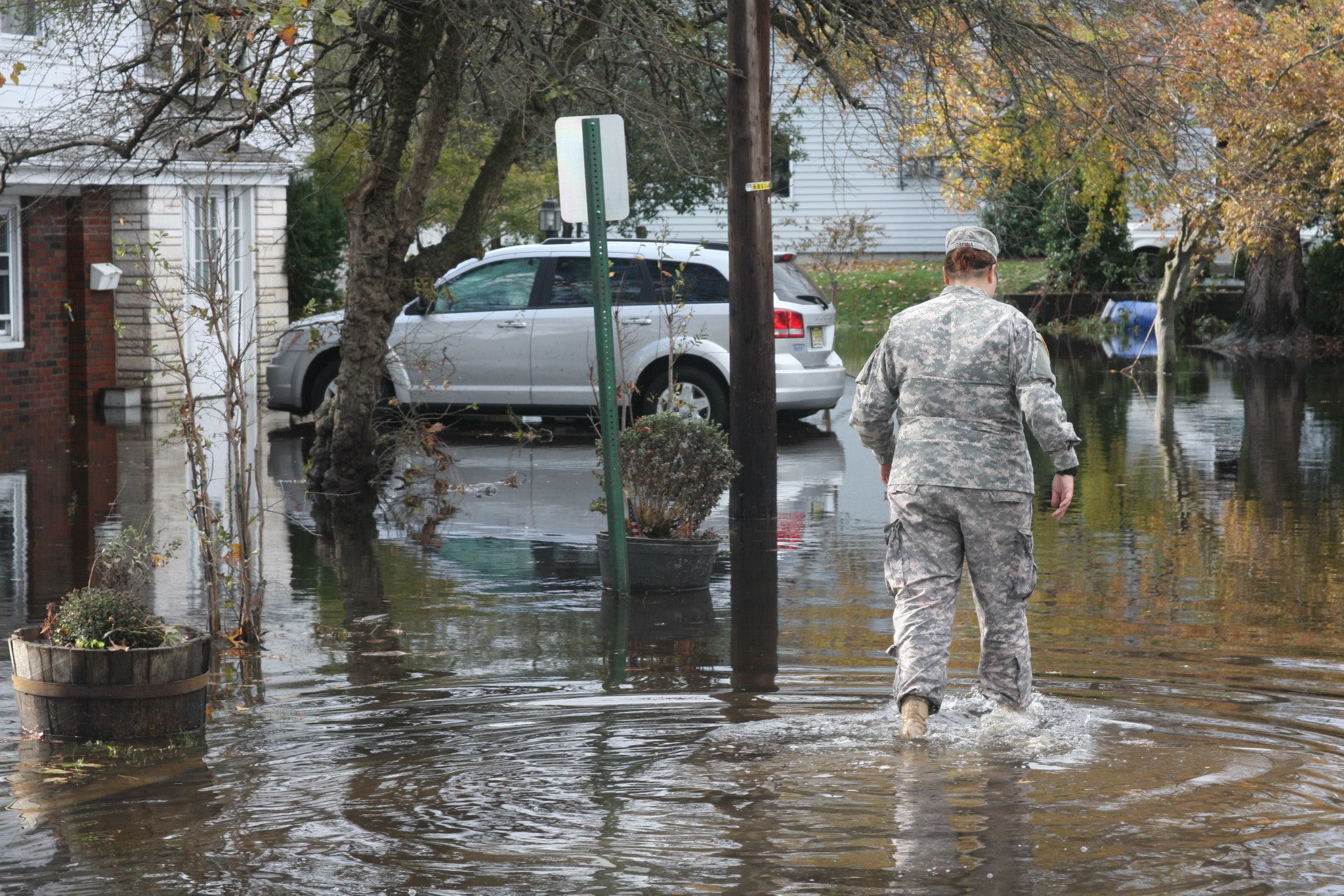
Hurricane Sandy flooding, Hoboken

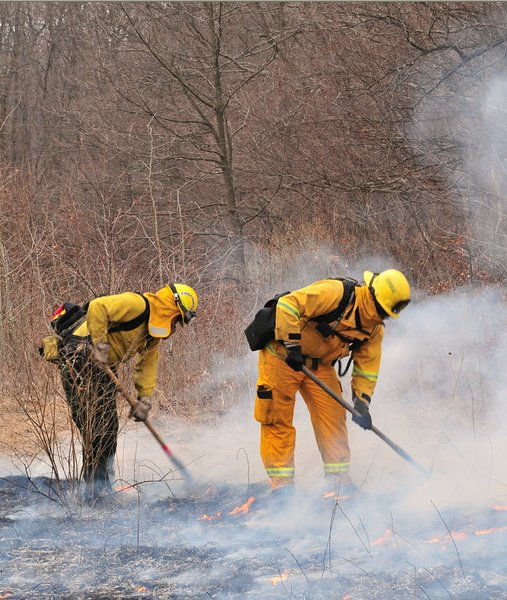
Wildfire, 2009

"The statewide average temperature in 2012," 56.0 °F (13.3 °C), "was the highest in 118 years of records." This was 2.8 °F (1.6 °C) above the 1981-2010 mean.

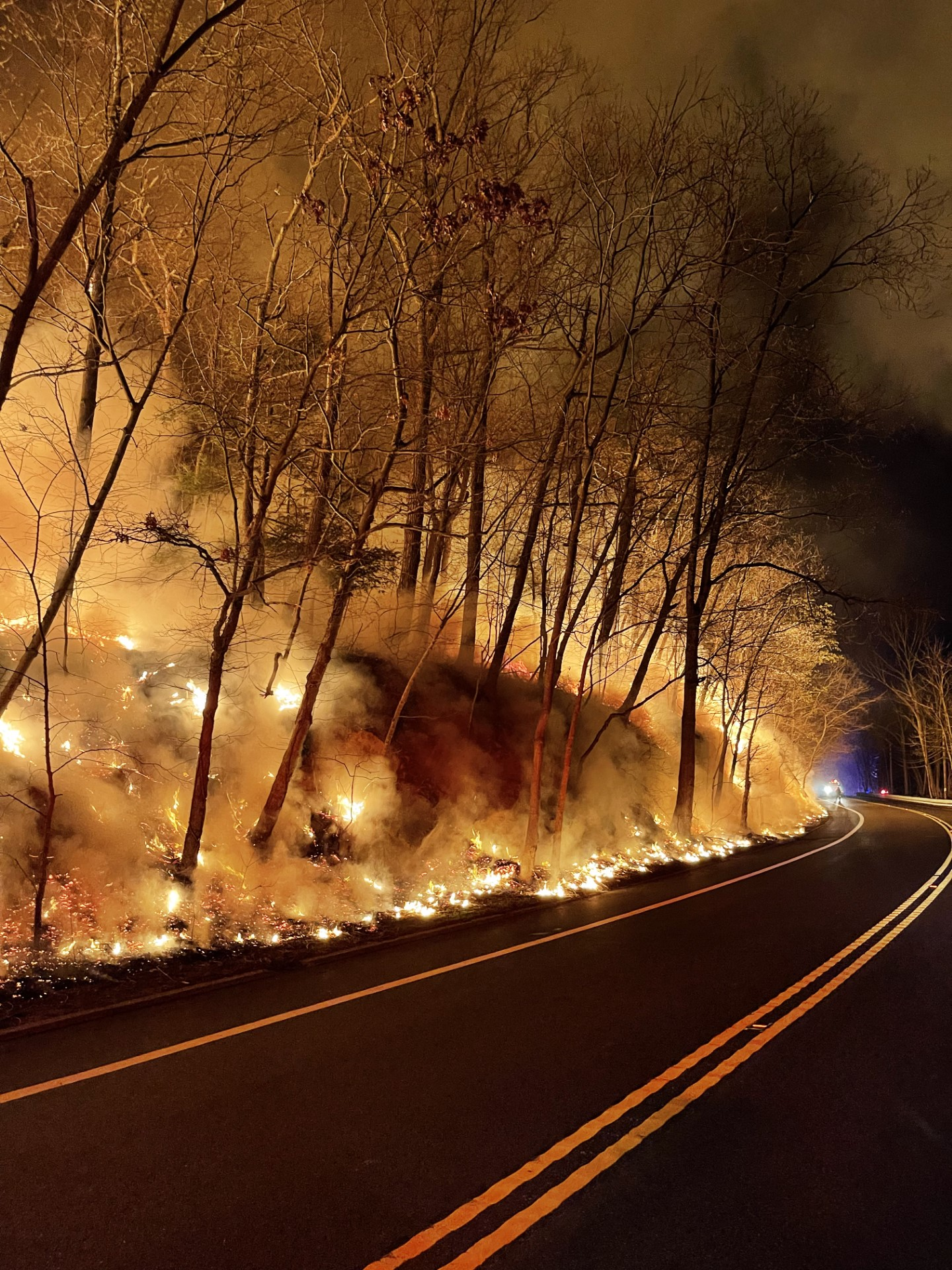
Kanouse fire near West Milford, 2023

As of 2013, "[n]ine of the ten warmest calendar years on record have occurred since 1990 and the five warmest years have occurred since 1998, consistent with the long-term upward trend of 2.2 °F (1.2 °C) per century."

== Precipitation ==
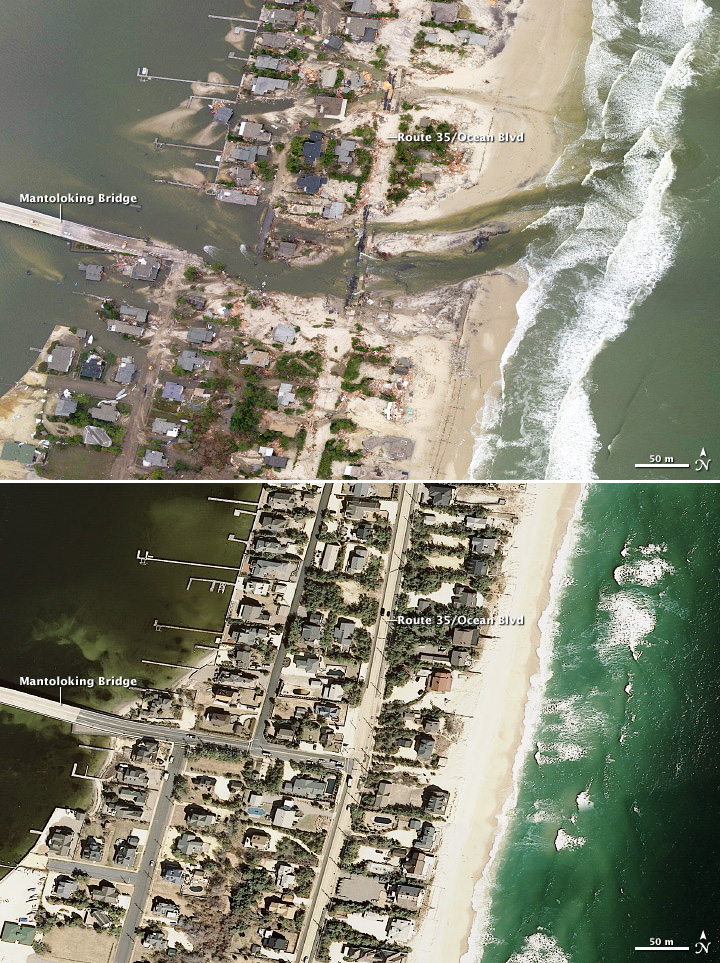
Destroyed houses, Hurricane Sandy

According to the EPA, as of 2016, "[a]verage annual precipitation in New Jersey has increased 5 to 10 percent in the last century, and precipitation from extremely heavy storms has increased 70 percent in the Northeast since 1958."

Similarly, according to a 2013 Rutgers Climate Institute study, "[s]ince 1895, annual precipitation has increased at a rate of 4.1 inches (100 mm) (or about 9%) per century."

As of 2013, 2011 was the wettest year on record.

Heavy precipitation events have been increasing in New Jersey, as is also the case "throughout the northeastern United States."

== Ecosystems ==
Many coastal species are already changing their distributions. If the sea level rises two feet (0.61 m) along the coast of New Jersey, "[w]etlands along Delaware Bay in Cumberland County" are "likely to be lost" due to such rise. Many species rely on tidal marshes which would be threatened as marshes erode. Such species include blue crab, perch, weakfish, flounder, and rockfish (which "rely on the tidal marshes in Delaware Bay to hide from predators"), as well as sea turtles and shorebirds (which feed on species that inhabit the marshes).

"In Barnegat Bay and Little Egg Harbor, the rising sea is already eroding and submerging small marsh islands, which are important nesting areas that protect common terns, black skimmers, and oystercatchers from land-based predators."

"Changing temperatures could also disrupt ecosystems. For example, if water temperatures exceed 86 °F (30 °C) during summer, eelgrass could be lost, which would remove a key source of food for many fish."

Higher acidity in the water also threatens certain species, like scallops and surf clams; this could lower their populations, threatening New Jersey's commercial fishing industry.

"Water temperature data from the late 1980s to early 2000s, collected at Rutgers University Marine Field Station, demonstrate milder winter temperatures in recent years while in this same period larvae of multiple fish species of southern origin became more abundant and those of northern species declined in richness and abundance."

== Coastline ==
=== Sea level rise ===
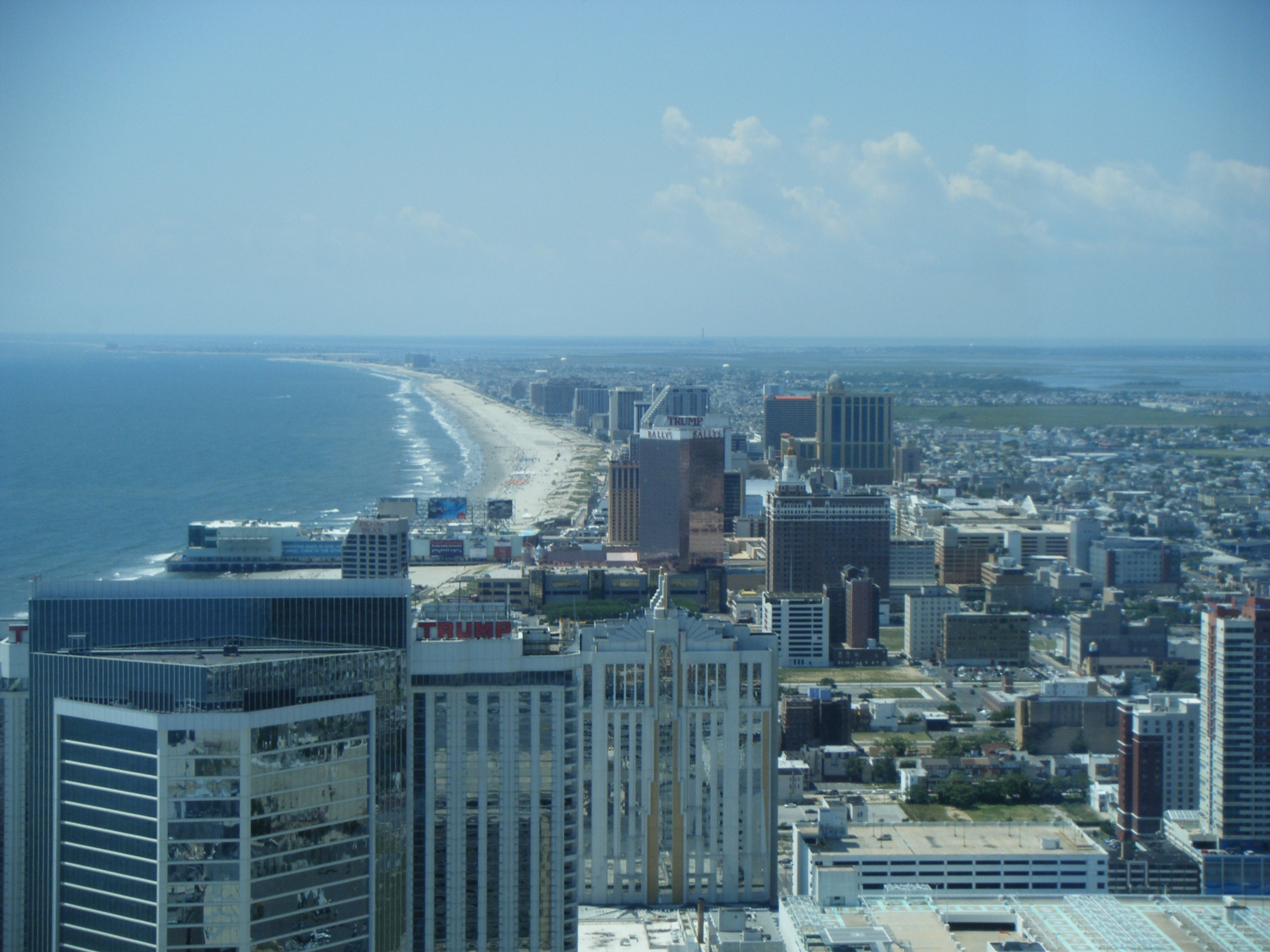
"At Atlantic City, where records extend back to 1912, sea level has risen by an average rate of 1.5 inches per decade over the period of record."

The sea level along the Jersey coast is rising faster than the global average, where the global average, since the early 1990s, has risen 1.2 inches (3.0 cm) per decade. "Sea level is rising more rapidly along the New Jersey shore than in most coastal areas because the land is sinking. If the oceans and atmosphere continue to warm, the sea is likely to rise eighteen inches (46 cm) to four feet (1.2 m) along the New Jersey shore in the next century."

The sinking of New Jersey results from the fact that "[i]ce sheets that covered New Jersey during that last Ice Age pushed the Earth's crust down into the mantle below and that sinking continues today." (See Post-glacial rebound)

Rutgers scientist project that by 2030, "sea level is projected to rise by 7 to 16 inches (18 to 41 cm), with a best estimate of 10 inches (25 cm). In 2050, the range is 13 to 28 inches (33 to 71 cm) with a best estimate of 18 inches (46 cm), and by 2100 the range is 30 to 71 inches (0.76 to 1.80 m) with a best estimate of 42 inches (1.1 m)."

"The United States Geological Survey estimates that barrier islands of the New Jersey shore from Bay Head to Cape May would be broken up by new inlets or lost to erosion if sea level rises three feet (0.91 m) by the year 2100, unless people take actions to reduce erosion."

=== Storms ===
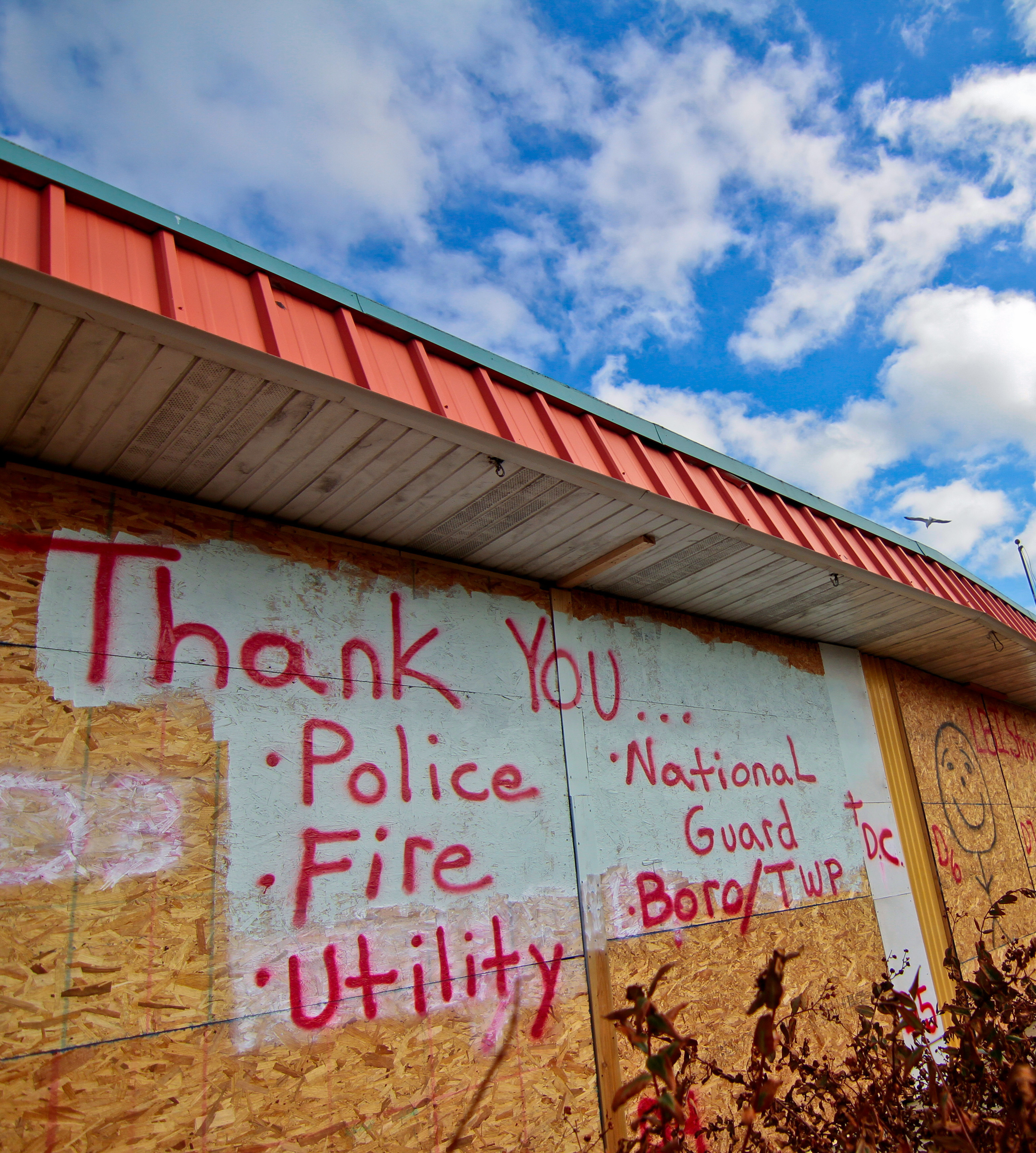
Sign thanking first responders after Hurricane Sandy, 2012.

As sea level rises, potential storm surge rises as well, threatening coastal homes and infrastructure. "Wind speeds and rainfall intensity during hurricanes and tropical storms are likely to increase as the climate warms. Rising sea level is likely to increase flood insurance rates, while more frequent storms could increase the deductible for wind damage in homeowner insurance policies."

Hurricane Sandy, which struck New Jersey in 2012, was made particularly dangerous because of the storm surge it caused. "Recent studies find little evidence of an increase in the number of hurricanes and tropical storms in the North atlantic during the past century, but there is evidence of an increase in the frequency and intensity of intense tropical cyclones during the period since 1970." "A recent NOAA study projects that the return period for coastal inundation equivalent to that from Sandy would decrease to less than 20 years by the end of the century if sea level rise in New Jersey is at the high end of the expected range."

A March 2019 report prepared by the United States Army Corps of Engineers "says coastal communities face a combined average of nearly $1.6 billion a year in damage in the future [from flooding, storms] if steps aren’t taken."

== Effects on human health ==
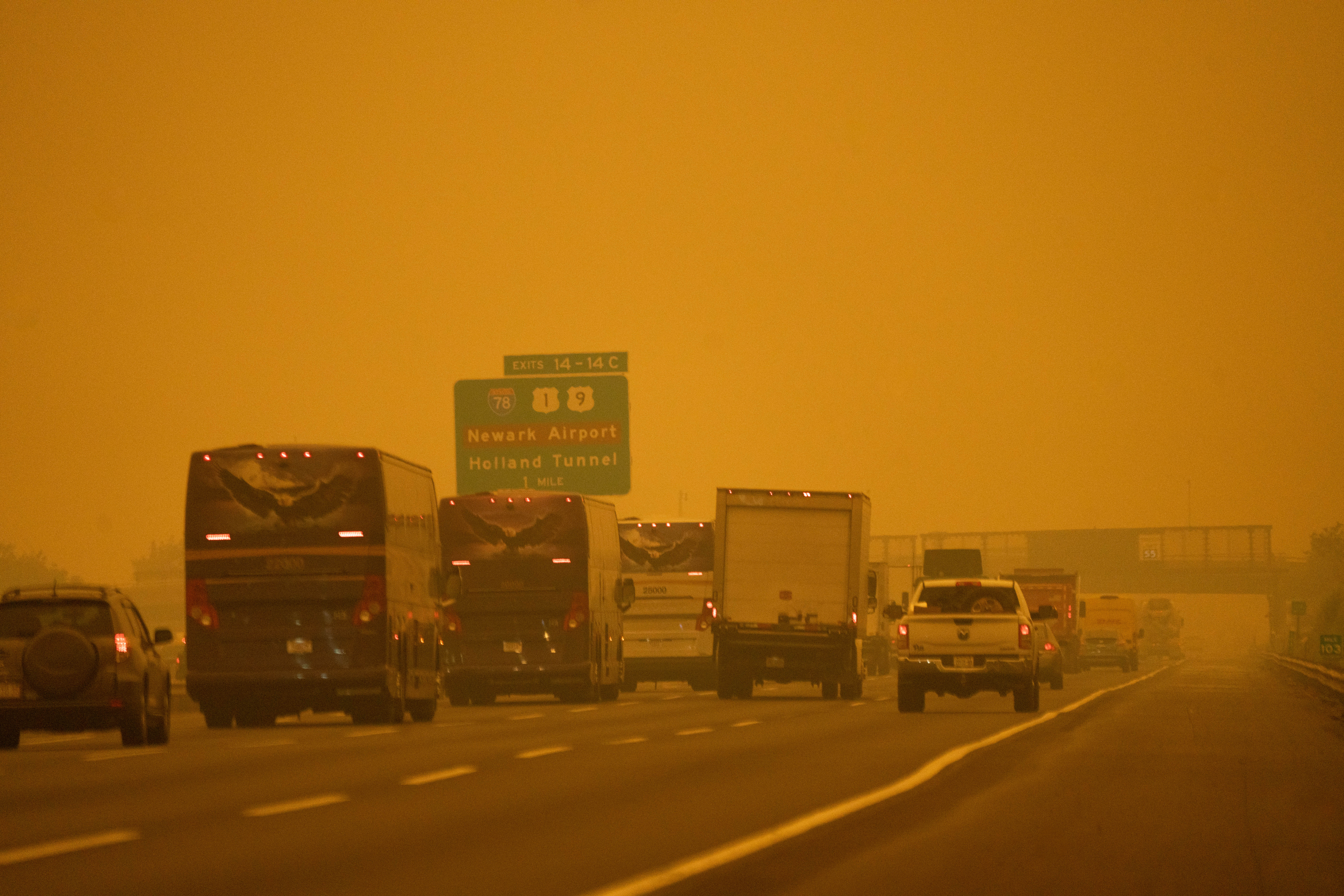
Wildfire smoke pollution, 2023

"Heat-related hospitalizations and emergency department visits in the summer have been rising over the past decade in New Jersey" as of 2017.

== Responses to climate change in New Jersey ==
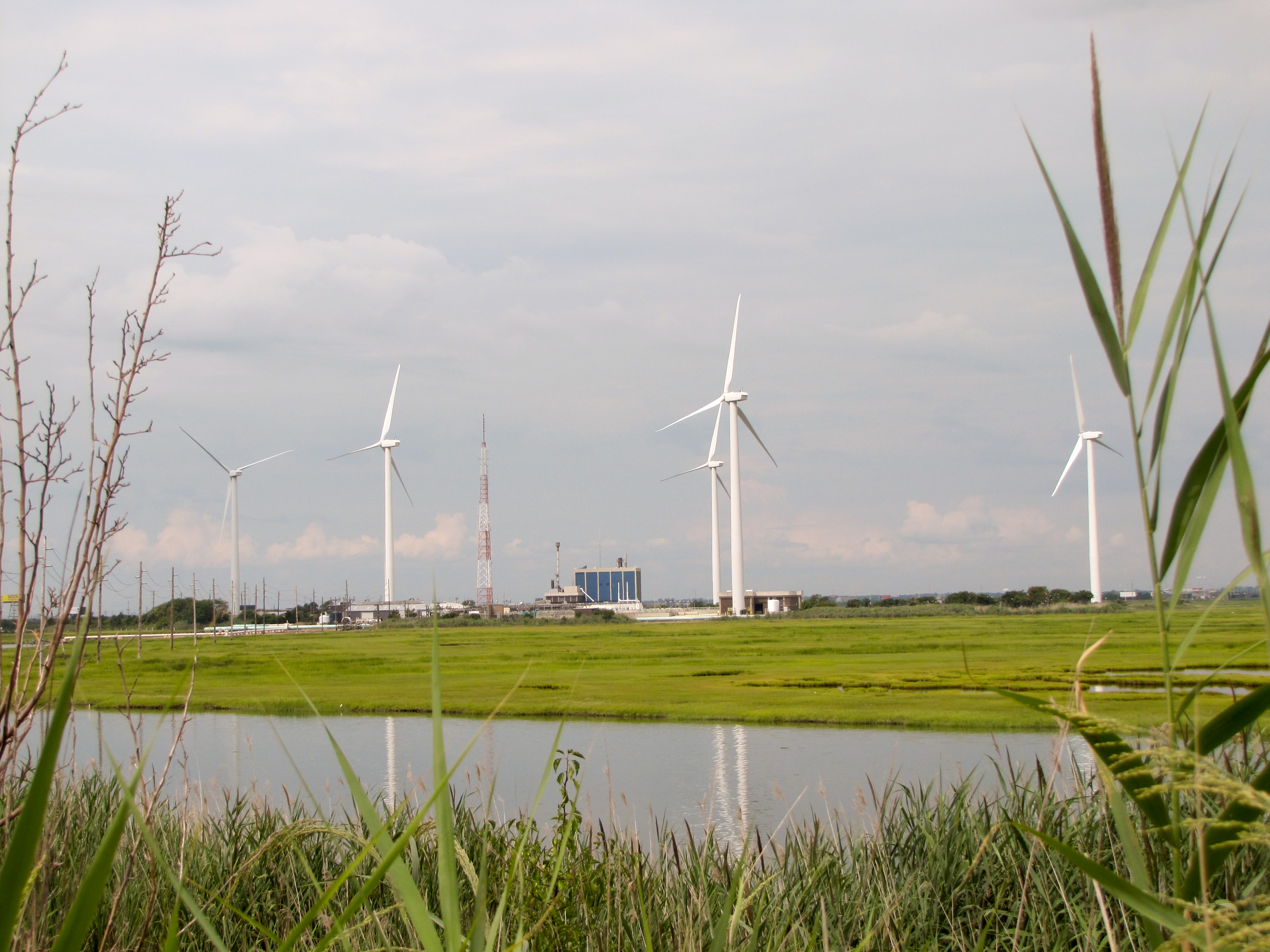
Jersey-Atlantic Wind Farm

=== Government ===
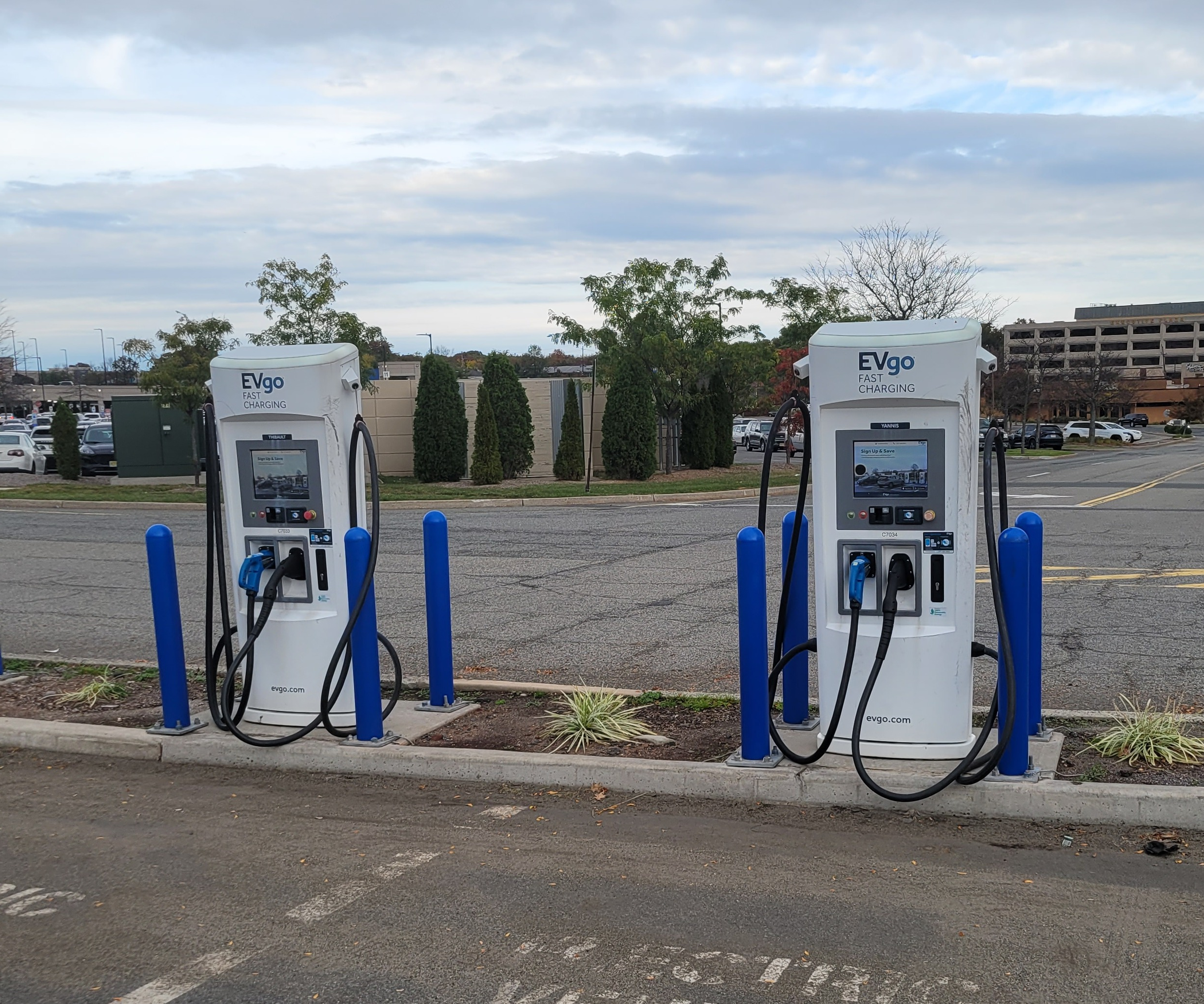
EVgo charging stand, Menlo Park Mall

The New Jersey Global Warming Response Act of 2007 sets targets for New Jersey to reduce greenhouse gas emissions: a reduction to 1990 levels by 2020, and a reduction of 80 percent from 2006 levels by 2050.

In December 2019, New Jersey joined consideration for a multi-state gasoline cap-and-trade program. The plan aims to reduce transportation-related tailpipe emissions, and would levy a tax on fuel companies based on carbon dioxide emissions. The most ambitious version of the plan is projected to reduce the area's tailpipe emissions by 25% between 2022 and 2032. The program is in the public comment phase, with individual states determining whether to participate. The program could begin as early as 2022.

=== University ===
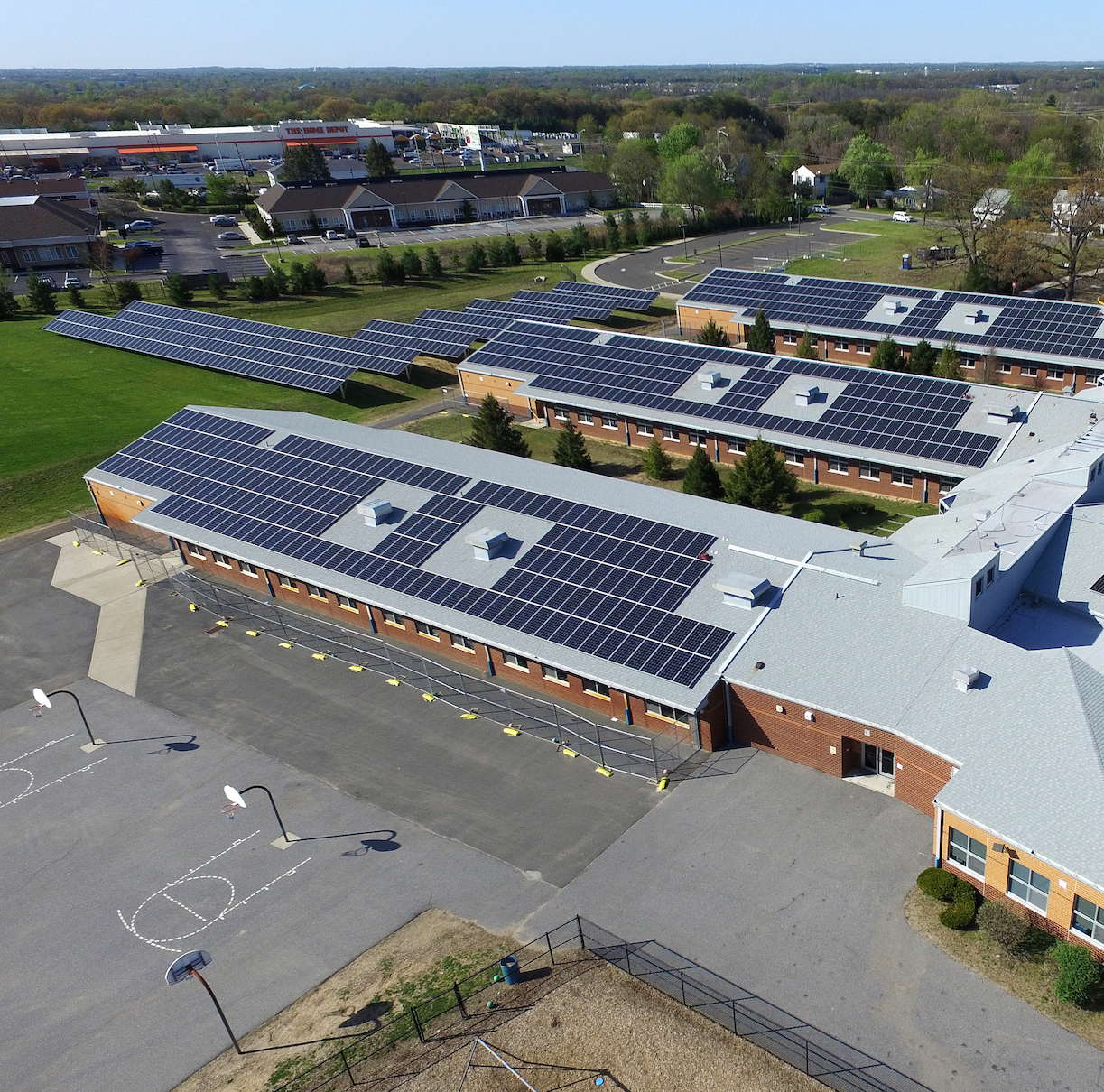
Solar roof installation, Delran

In 2011, the New Jersey Climate Change Alliance was formed at Rutgers University. The organization "is a collective of organizations and individuals that share the goal of advancing science-informed climate change strategies and policy at the state and local levels in New Jersey." "The Alliance is facilitated by Rutgers University through the Rutgers Climate Institute and the Bloustein School of Planning and Public Policy."

The Rutgers Climate Institute at Rutgers University states that it "is a University-wide effort to address one of the most important issues of our time through research, education and outreach." The Institute facilitates collaboration across different academic departments and focuses on outreach.

== See also ==
- Climate of New Jersey
- Effects of Hurricane Sandy in New Jersey
- Plug-in electric vehicles in New Jersey
