= Richard O'Sullivan (disambiguation) =

Richard O'Sullivan (1944–2026) was a British actor.

Richard (or Dick) O'Sullivan may also refer to:

- Richard O'Sullivan (filmmaker) (born 1968), American screenwriter, director, actor, producer, cinematographer, film editor, radio personality, and founder of Lost Colony Entertainment
- Richard O'Sullivan (teacher) (1826–1889), teacher and school inspector in Auckland
- Dick O'Sullivan, Irish boy featured on programme five of On the Street Where You Live
- Dick O'Sullivan, interim manager of Punchestown Racecourse

== See also ==
- Richard Sullivan (disambiguation)
- Rick O'Sullivan, the co-owner of Think Big (horse)
