= New Jersey stormwater management rules =

The New Jersey stormwater management rules were organized in 1983 and updated in 2004. The rules restrict building within 300-foot of "high quality water"; and stormwater and parking lot runoff at new developments must be diverted to a retention basin or a detention basin that are used for groundwater recharge to replenish the aquifer. The detention basins have the added effect of filtering urban runoff from parking lots of motor oil and other chemicals that would end up in storm sewers and eventually rivers and streams.

== History ==
New Jersey receives an average of 44 inches of precipitation each year. About 15 to 39 inches of that rain recharge the reservoirs and aquifers. The original stormwater management rules were passed in 1983 and changes were first proposed in 2002 by the New Jersey Department of Environmental Protection. In 2004 Governor James McGreevey signed into law two new stormwater rules. The new rules minimize the impact of new development by encouraging groundwater recharge by rainwater harvesting using detention ponds. It also controls development near waterways by creating a buffer.

== See also ==
- Kirkwood-Cohansey aquifer
- Drainage law
