= Drainage law =

Area of water law related to drainage of surface water

Drainage law is a specific area of water law related to drainage of surface water on real property. It is particularly important in areas where freshwater is scarce, flooding is common, or water is in high demand for agricultural or commercial purposes.

== In the United States ==
In the United States, regulation of drainage is typically done on the state and local level. In addition to whatever statutes or local ordinances may be in effect in a given locality, there are three basic legal doctrines which the various state courts recognize.

In the State of Michigan, drainage law is so important that most counties still elect a drain commissioner to regulate drainage of surface water.

=== Common enemy doctrine ===
The common enemy doctrine is a rule derived from English common law. It holds that because surface water is a "common enemy" of landowners, each landowner has the right to alter the drainage pattern of his land (for example by building dikes or drainage channels) without regard for the effects on neighboring parcels, as long as that water flows to where it otherwise would have naturally flowed. Typically, a landowner can capture surface water (e.g. by rain barrels or dams) as well, and lower landowners will not have a cause of action unless the diversion is malicious. This rule is followed by approximately half of the U.S. states, although some states have modified the doctrine to hold landowners liable for negligent damage to parcels of neighboring landowners.

=== Civil law rule ===
The civil law rule, so named because it is derived from the civil law systems of France and Spain, is effectively the opposite of the common enemy doctrine. It holds that the owner of a parcel of lower land must accept the natural drainage from higher parcels and cannot alter the drainage pattern of his own land to increase the drainage flow onto lower parcels. For this reason the rule is sometimes referred to as the "natural flow rule".

Application of the civil law rule in its purest form would inhibit development of land because virtually every improvement on a parcel alters natural drainage. For this reason this rule has been modified in those jurisdictions that use it in order to permit reasonable changes in natural flow, often weighing the competing interests of neighboring landholders with the benefit of the development of the parcel.

=== Reasonable use rule ===
The reasonable use rule presents an alternative to both the common enemy doctrine and the civil law rule. It allows a landowner to make "reasonable" alteration to the drainage pattern of his parcel, with liability only when the alteration causes "unreasonable" harm of neighboring parcels. Judicial mitigation of the common enemy doctrine and civil law rule often results in an approximation of the reasonable use rule.

Because the reasonable use rule presents a subjective standard, courts will often employ a balancing test to determine whether a landowner is liable to neighbors for alteration of drainage. For example, under the Restatement of Torts, the test was:

1. Was there reasonable necessity for the property owner to alter the drainage to make use of their land?
2. Was the alteration done in a reasonable manner?
3. Does the utility of the actor’s conduct reasonably outweigh the gravity of harm to others?

== In the United Kingdom ==
In the United Kingdom the Land Drainage Act 1991 decrees drainage of land in England and Wales, but does not cover sewerage and water supplies but the actual process of draining land itself. The act defines who is responsible for various aspects of land drainage and the different areas in which the law applies.

== See also ==
- Land Drainage Act
- Best management practice for water pollution
- New Jersey stormwater management rules
- United States groundwater law
- Water politics
