= New Jersey Tidelands Resource Council =

Government body in New Jersey, United States

The Tidelands Resource Council is a body of twelve members appointed by the Governor. The Council meets monthly and makes decisions to sell or rent state tidelands. All of the decisions must then be approved by the Commissioner of the Department of Environmental Protection, the Attorney General and the Governor. The council meets the first Wednesday of every month, with the exception of January, at NJ Civil Service Commission, 44 S. Clinton Ave., Trenton, NJ. Council meetings begin at 10 am and are open to the public.

== History ==
The passage of the Wharf Act of 1851 allowed upland property owners to reclaim or wharf out tidal lands otherwise claimed by the state. Then, in 1864, the Legislature created the Board of Riparian Commissioners, the earliest predecessor to the current Tidelands Resource Council. The Wharf Act was repealed in 1869 for those areas in New York Harbor. On the same day, the Legislature enacted the United Companies Act of 1869. Under this act the United Companies were authorized to reclaim and erect wharves and other improvements in front of any of their lands adjoining Kill Van Kull or any other tidewaters, and "when so reclaimed and improved to have, hold, possess and enjoy the same as owners thereof" subject to certain provisions. The Wharf Act was repealed in its entirety in 1891.

In 1967, the Supreme Court of New Jersey affirmed in the case of O'Neill v. State Highway Department that the state owns "all lands that are flowed by the tide up to the high-water line or mark." After the O'Neill decision, legislation was adopted that required title studies and surveys of the state's tidelands. The State of New Jersey eventually filed maps laying claim to properties in seventeen of New Jersey's twenty-one counties.

== Current ==
Use	2013 Rate	Minimum fee
Residential water	$0.53/ft2	$100.00
Commercial/Industrial	7% of Upland Value Equalized	$100.00
Boat, Yacht & Beach Clubs	$0.35/ft2	$100.00
Bridges	$0.03/ft2	$100.00
Utilities	$0.11/ft2	$1250.00
Aquaculture	$0.01/ft2	$100.00
Marinas	6% of Potential gross Income	None

Current members of the Council are:

- Stuart Challoner of Island Heights
- Philip J. Diberardino, Sr of Margate
- Edward “Ned” Gaine
- Joseph A. Grabas, CTP, NTP of Freehold
- Edward “Skip” Harrison
- Martha Maxwell-Doyle of Little Egg Harbor
- Andrew Raichle
- Mary Pat Robbie of Marlton, Chairperson
- Thomas C. Voltaggio of Cherry Hill
- Zoe Baldwin of Neptune Township
- Vacant

Tidelands Resource Council is the public body responsible for the stewardship of the State's riparian lands; that it is the responsibility of the council to determine whether applications for the lease, license, or grant of riparian lands are in the public interest; that it is the responsibility of the council to determine, in assessing applications for the lease, license, or grant of riparian lands, whether the State may have a future use for such lands; that the council must obtain the fair market value for the lease, license or grant of riparian lands in accordance with court decisions and legal opinions of the Attorney General.

=== Grants ===
The State of New Jersey currently will only sell grants of formerly flowed tidelands. Commonly, these are tidal streams or bays filled for development, or bulkhead areas where formerly flowed land exists behind the bulkhead.

Grants are made at current fair market value with some exceptions. A "good-faith discount" is offered to landowners who bought their property without knowing portions were claimed by the state. This occurs when the land was purchased before the maps were filed with the county clerk in 1982. The state also offers a "litigation risk" discount when the state's claim does not include aerial photographs showing remnants. A 15% pierhead line reduction may be used for grants outshore of the bulkhead line where a pierhead line exists. A condo association discount of 10% may be applied when the number of units is three (3) or more.

Grants are subject to a minimum consideration of $1,000.

== Maps ==
Various maps and photographic sources are used to determine ownership of tidelands.

Historical private map sources include:

- Insurance Map of Jersey City by I.B. Culver & Company 1866
- Insurance Map of the City of Hoboken by Arnois, Spielman & Co 1868

== Major Riparian Cases ==
Leonard v State Highway Department of N.J., 29 N.J. Super. 188 (App. Div. 1954)
Notice to riparian owners not required when state highway agency acquires land for highway purposes.
O'Neill v State High Department, 50 N.J. 307 (1967)
Landmark riparian lands decision. Defined the mean high water line.
Ward Sand and Materials Co. v. Palmer, 51 N.J. 51 (1968)
Disrepair of embankments to exclude tide may cause tidally re-flowed lands to revert to the state.
Borough of Wildwood Crest v. Masciarella, 51 N.J. 352 (1968)
Rules of erosion and accretion.
Garrett v. State, 118 N.J. Super. 594 (Ch Div. 1972)
Artificial avulsion rule.
LeCompte v. State, 125 N.J. Super. 352 (App. Div. 1972)
Back rent for prior occupation of riparian lands
LeCompte v. State, 128 N.J. Super. 552 (App. Div. 1974)
Fair market value for conveyances
Newark v. Natural Resources Council, DEP, 133 N.J. Super. 245 (Law Div. 1975)
Mapping procedures to determine title.
B.P. Oil, Inc. v. State, 153 N.J. Super. 389 (Law Div. 1977)
State has no obligation to convey riparian lands for an inadequate price.
Newark v. Natural Resource Council, 82 N.J. 530 (Law Div. 1980)
Established validity of biological delineation using spectral reflectance. Supported state ownership claims over tidally-flowed, non-navigable waters.
Dickinson v. The Fund for the Support of Free Public Schools, 95 N.J. 65, 84 (1983)
State satisfied the requirements to define and assert riparian claims on tidelands it had identified and formalized on maps.
Housing Authority of City of Atlantic City v. State, 188 N.J. Super. 145 (1984)
Natural avulsion may not cause land to revert to state ownership.

== Glossary ==
alluvion
the increase in the shore line due to sediment
avulsion
the sudden loss of shore land from a property, typically by flooding or a change in course of a river
bulk head line
a line offshore of which no solid fill is permitted
front foot grant
a grant based upon linear width along the frontage of a property
mean high water line
the average, or mean, of all high tides over a period of 18.6 years
metes and bounds
a description of land by listing compass directions and distances of the boundaries.
pierhead line
a line offshore of a bulkhead allowing for piers but where solid fill is not permitted
riparian grant
a grant of lands below the mean high water line
Statement of No Interest
A Statement of No Interest is an official document issued by the State of New Jersey attesting to the fact that a particular property or area is free from all state tidelands claims.
