= Drain commissioner =

Government official in Michigan, U.S.

A drain commissioner is an elected official in county government of the U.S. state of Michigan who is responsible for planning, developing and maintaining surface water drainage systems under Public Act 40 of 1956. In counties with a population under 12,000, the office of drain commissioner may be abolished with its statutory duties and responsibilities performed by the county's board of road commissioners. Unlike other county-wide officeholders, drain commissioners were created by statute and are not mandated by the Michigan Constitution. Drain commissioners are elected on the partisan ballot in presidential election years for a term of four years.

== History and reform ==
The office of drain commissioner dates to Michigan's statehood in 1837, as much of the state's land was swamps and wetlands. An early bill passed by the Michigan Legislature was a drainage act, which led to the creation of drain commissioners at the township level. In 1897, township drain commissioners were abolished and the position was transferred to county government.

Over the years, proposals have been made to reform and even abolish the office. Successful efforts have changed the law to allow individual counties to rename the office to public works commissioner or water resources commissioner.

An unsuccessful reform proposal in 2009 was led by the then-drain commissioner of Cheboygan County, Dennis Lennox, who sought to abolish the office in counties with a population of less than 35,000. This proposal was introduced in both houses of the Legislature after being approved by the Cheboygan County Board of Commissioners.

In 2012, the Schoolcraft County Board of Commissioners abolished the office of drain commissioner and transferred its duties and responsibilities to the county's road commissioners.

== Duties and responsibilities ==
It is the only elected office in Michigan that can directly levy taxes and borrow money without a vote of the people. This led one drain commissioner to declare he is more powerful than the governor. While the powers of the drain commissioner are immense, the office has become a sinecure in some counties, meaning it requires little to no responsibility.

Nevertheless, drain commissioners are responsible for overseeing the county's drains. In Michigan, a drain may be a natural or artificial creek or ditch, or a massive pipe for carrying storm water. The territory served by a particular drain, its watershed, is typically organized as a drainage district and the drain commissioner levies tax assessments and directs construction or maintenance of drains and culverts on behalf of each district. Drainage districts are public corporations, with legal rights similar to other political subdivisions of state government. Counties typically have dozens even hundreds of drainage districts.

== See also ==
- Government of Michigan
- Drainage law
