= Climate of New Jersey =

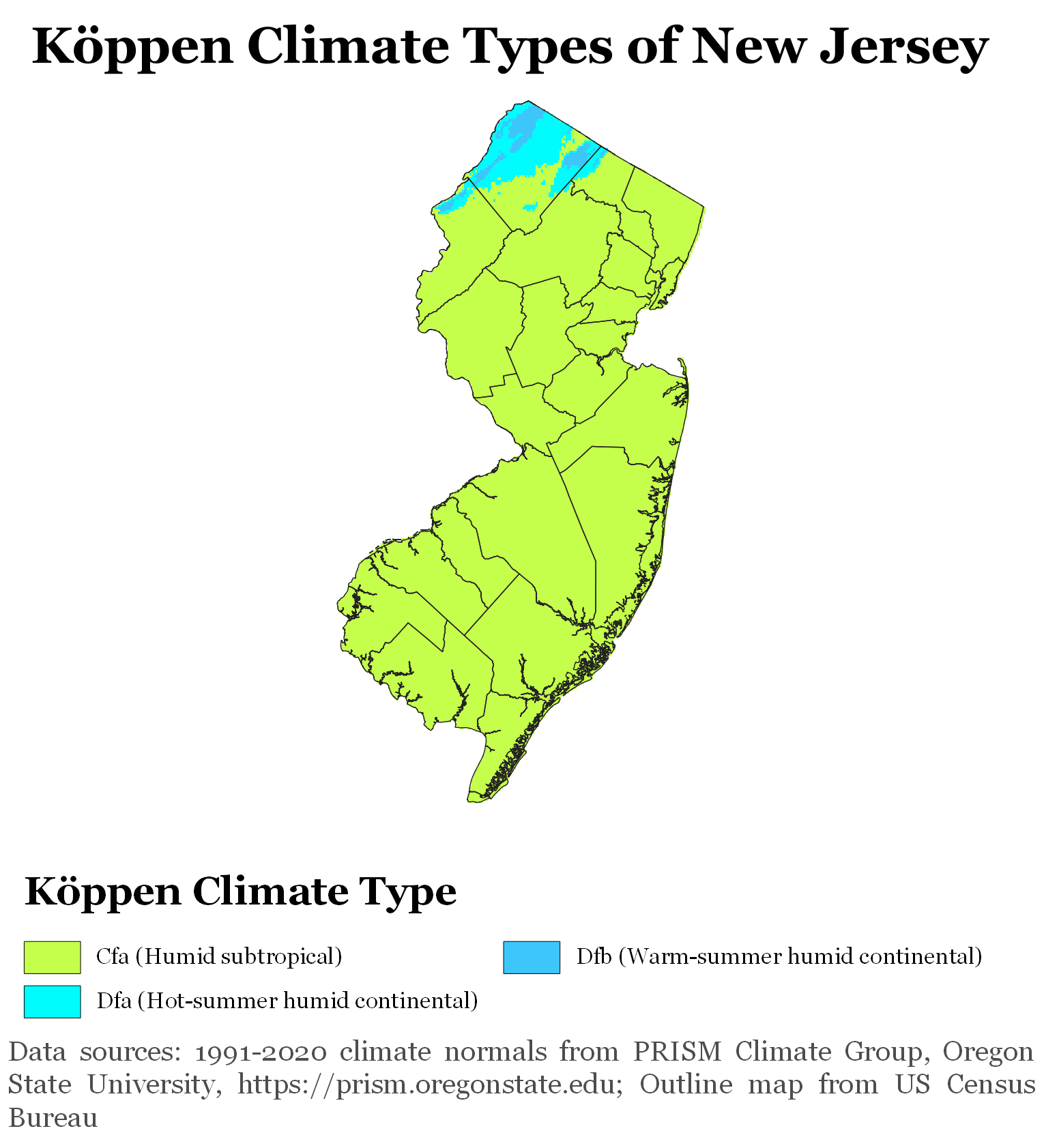
Köppen climate types of New Jersey, using 1991-2020 climate normals.

The climate of New Jersey per the global Köppen classification of the U.S. state of New Jersey is humid subtropical in almost all of New Jersey, including all of South Jersey and Central Jersey, with the vestiges of a humid continental climate remaining only in the northern extreme of North Jersey. The northwestern part of New Jersey is the snowiest due to its higher elevations, which earn it a Dfb classification. During winter, New Jersey can experience Nor'easters, which are snowstorms that affect the Northeastern United States, and Atlantic Canada. However, many would-be snow events in the state end up turning to rain due to warm ocean air being brought in by the storm and also by compressional heating of air from the west as it descends eastward of the Poconos Mountains from Pennsylvania. New Jersey's climate is shaped prominently by its proximity to the Atlantic Ocean, which provides moisture and moderates temperatures. According to climatology research by the U.S. National Oceanic and Atmospheric Administration, New Jersey has been the fastest-warming of all 50 U.S. states by average air temperature over a 100-year period beginning in the early 20th century, related to global warming.

== Temperatures ==
Average daily low temperature in January

Average daily high temperature in July

Temperatures are usually coolest in the northwestern part of the state and warmest in the southern part of the state. The temperature difference is greatest in the winter and the least in the summer. All parts of the state have recorded temperatures below 0 degrees Fahrenheit or -18 degrees Celsius and in excess of 100 degrees Fahrenheit or 38 degrees Celsius. The average number of freeze-free days ranges from 163 days in the highlands to 217 along the coast. The highest recorded temperature in the state of New Jersey was 43 °C or 110 °F on July 10, 1936 in Runyon and the lowest was −37 °C or −34 °F in River Vale on January 5, 1904. The hardiness zone ranges from 5b in high areas of Sussex County to 8a in parts of Atlantic City and Cape May.

== Precipitation ==
The average annual precipitation in New Jersey ranges from 40 inches (1,000 mm) along the southeastern coast to around 51 inches (1,300 mm) in the north-central part of the state. The driest season is usually autumn which has an average of 8 days per month with measurable precipitation. During other seasons the average month has between 9 and 12 days of precipitation. Most areas receive between 25-30 thunderstorms a year. While tornadoes are possible, they tend to be rare and weak. There are usually about five tornadoes reported each year statewide. The greatest 24-hour rainfall recorded was 14.81 inches (376 mm), which occurred in Tuckerton on August 19 - 20, 1939.

== Snowfall ==
Snow is relatively common in New Jersey, with most of it occurring between November 15 and April 15. Significant snowfall is much rarer along the coastline and in South Jersey than in Interior North Jersey. The record for 24-hour snowfall is 81 centimetres (32 in) in Rutherford on December 14, 1915. The greatest snow depth ever recorded was 130 centimetres (52 in) at the Canistear Reservoir in Vernon Township on February 5, 1961.

== Climate change ==
Climate change is affecting New Jersey faster than much of the rest of the United States. New Jersey has warmed up faster than any other U.S. state by average air temperature over a 100-year period beginning in the early 20th century. Additionally notable is that New Jersey's rapid urban and suburban development over 20th century has contributed to "warming faster" than all other U.S. states over the past century. This issue is called urban heat island effect. This is largely due to its small size and high urban to rural proportion than other states.

== Climate data for select New Jersey cities ==
Climate data for Atlantic City International Airport, 1991–2020 normals, (Note: Mean monthly maxima and minima (i.e. the highest and lowest temperature readings during an entire month or year) calculated based on data at said location from 1991 to 2020.) extremes 1874–present (Note: The official climatology station for Atlantic City was at the Weather Bureau Office downtown from January 1874 to 15 June 1958 and Atlantic City Int'l (ACY) in Egg Harbor Township since 16 June 1958. ACY's location in the Pine Barrens and distance away from the coast and urban heat island of downtown Atlantic City largely account for its markedly colder temperatures at night as compared to downtown; for example, from 1959 to 2013, there were 50 days with a low of 0 °F (−18 °C) or lower, while in the same period, the corresponding number of days at downtown was 2. The National Weather Service ceased regular snowfall observations at downtown after the winter of 1958–59.)
Month	Jan	Feb	Mar	Apr	May	Jun	Jul	Aug	Sep	Oct	Nov	Dec	Year
Record high °F (°C)	78 (26)	76 (24)	87 (31)	94 (34)	99 (37)	102 (39)	105 (41)	103 (39)	99 (37)	96 (36)	84 (29)	77 (25)	106 (41)
Mean maximum °F (°C)	63.5 (17.5)	64.8 (18.2)	73.2 (22.9)	83.2 (28.4)	89.3 (31.8)	94.5 (34.7)	96.9 (36.1)	94.6 (34.8)	90.1 (32.3)	82.8 (28.2)	72.7 (22.6)	65.3 (18.5)	98.1 (36.7)
Mean daily maximum °F (°C)	43.2 (6.2)	45.8 (7.7)	52.6 (11.4)	63.3 (17.4)	72.5 (22.5)	81.5 (27.5)	86.6 (30.3)	84.8 (29.3)	78.5 (25.8)	67.7 (19.8)	57.1 (13.9)	48.1 (8.9)	65.1 (18.4)
Daily mean °F (°C)	34.1 (1.2)	36.0 (2.2)	42.6 (5.9)	52.5 (11.4)	61.9 (16.6)	71.4 (21.9)	76.9 (24.9)	75.0 (23.9)	68.4 (20.2)	57.1 (13.9)	46.8 (8.2)	38.7 (3.7)	55.1 (12.8)
Mean daily minimum °F (°C)	25.1 (−3.8)	26.2 (−3.2)	32.6 (0.3)	41.7 (5.4)	51.4 (10.8)	61.3 (16.3)	67.2 (19.6)	65.2 (18.4)	58.2 (14.6)	46.4 (8.0)	36.6 (2.6)	29.4 (−1.4)	45.1 (7.3)
Mean minimum °F (°C)	6.5 (−14.2)	9.7 (−12.4)	16.1 (−8.8)	26.7 (−2.9)	36.0 (2.2)	46.2 (7.9)	55.9 (13.3)	53.8 (12.1)	43.5 (6.4)	31.0 (−0.6)	20.4 (−6.4)	14.0 (−10.0)	4.4 (−15.3)
Record low °F (°C)	−10 (−23)	−11 (−24)	2 (−17)	12 (−11)	25 (−4)	37 (3)	42 (6)	40 (4)	32 (0)	20 (−7)	10 (−12)	−7 (−22)	−11 (−24)
Average precipitation inches (mm)	3.38 (86)	3.23 (82)	4.52 (115)	3.32 (84)	3.34 (85)	3.58 (91)	4.47 (114)	4.59 (117)	3.55 (90)	4.14 (105)	3.37 (86)	4.47 (114)	45.96 (1,167)
Average snowfall inches (cm)	5.7 (14)	5.9 (15)	2.2 (5.6)	0.3 (0.76)	0.0 (0.0)	0.0 (0.0)	0.0 (0.0)	0.0 (0.0)	0.0 (0.0)	0.0 (0.0)	0.1 (0.25)	3.2 (8.1)	17.4 (44)
Average extreme snow depth inches (cm)	3.6 (9.1)	3.1 (7.9)	1.3 (3.3)	0.1 (0.25)	0.0 (0.0)	0.0 (0.0)	0.0 (0.0)	0.0 (0.0)	0.0 (0.0)	0.0 (0.0)	0.0 (0.0)	1.9 (4.8)	6.0 (15)
Average precipitation days (≥ 0.01 in)	10.8	10.4	10.9	11.4	10.5	9.9	9.9	9.2	8.5	8.9	8.9	10.8	120.1
Average snowy days (≥ 0.1 in)	3.0	3.2	1.2	0.1	0.0	0.0	0.0	0.0	0.0	0.0	0.0	1.4	8.9
Average relative humidity (%)	69.5	69.0	66.9	66.4	70.7	72.9	73.9	75.7	76.4	74.8	72.8	70.6	71.6
Average dew point °F (°C)	21.6 (−5.8)	23.2 (−4.9)	30.0 (−1.1)	37.9 (3.3)	49.5 (9.7)	59.4 (15.2)	64.8 (18.2)	64.2 (17.9)	57.7 (14.3)	46.4 (8.0)	37.0 (2.8)	27.0 (−2.8)	43.2 (6.2)
Mean monthly sunshine hours	150.8	157.9	204.5	218.9	243.9	266.2	276.3	271.3	227.6	200.5	147.4	133.8	2,499.1
Percentage possible sunshine	50	53	55	55	55	60	61	64	61	58	49	46	56
Average ultraviolet index	1.6	2.6	4.2	6.0	7.5	8.5	8.6	7.7	6.0	3.8	2.1	1.5	5.0
Source 1: NOAA (relative humidity, dew point and sun 1961–1990)
Source 2: UV Index Today (1995 to 2022)

Climate data for Newark, New Jersey (Newark Liberty Int'l), 1991–2020 normals, extremes 1843–present
Month	Jan	Feb	Mar	Apr	May	Jun	Jul	Aug	Sep	Oct	Nov	Dec	Year
Record high °F (°C)	74 (23)	80 (27)	89 (32)	97 (36)	99 (37)	103 (39)	108 (42)	105 (41)	105 (41)	96 (36)	85 (29)	76 (24)	108 (42)
Mean maximum °F (°C)	61.8 (16.6)	62.5 (16.9)	72.3 (22.4)	84.4 (29.1)	91.4 (33.0)	95.9 (35.5)	98.7 (37.1)	95.9 (35.5)	91.5 (33.1)	82.4 (28.0)	72.2 (22.3)	63.8 (17.7)	100.0 (37.8)
Mean daily maximum °F (°C)	40.0 (4.4)	43.0 (6.1)	50.9 (10.5)	62.6 (17.0)	72.6 (22.6)	81.8 (27.7)	86.9 (30.5)	84.7 (29.3)	77.7 (25.4)	66.0 (18.9)	54.9 (12.7)	44.8 (7.1)	63.8 (17.7)
Daily mean °F (°C)	32.8 (0.4)	35.1 (1.7)	42.5 (5.8)	53.3 (11.8)	63.3 (17.4)	72.7 (22.6)	78.2 (25.7)	76.4 (24.7)	69.2 (20.7)	57.5 (14.2)	47.0 (8.3)	38.0 (3.3)	55.5 (13.1)
Mean daily minimum °F (°C)	25.5 (−3.6)	27.2 (−2.7)	34.2 (1.2)	44.1 (6.7)	53.9 (12.2)	63.6 (17.6)	69.4 (20.8)	68.0 (20.0)	60.7 (15.9)	49.0 (9.4)	39.0 (3.9)	31.2 (−0.4)	47.1 (8.4)
Mean minimum °F (°C)	9.1 (−12.7)	12.1 (−11.1)	19.4 (−7.0)	32.3 (0.2)	42.5 (5.8)	52.5 (11.4)	61.9 (16.6)	59.2 (15.1)	48.3 (9.1)	36.1 (2.3)	25.9 (−3.4)	17.2 (−8.2)	7.0 (−13.9)
Record low °F (°C)	−13 (−25)	−14 (−26)	2 (−17)	13 (−11)	31 (−1)	38 (3)	46 (8)	45 (7)	34 (1)	22 (−6)	8 (−13)	−13 (−25)	−14 (−26)
Average precipitation inches (mm)	3.42 (87)	2.98 (76)	4.13 (105)	3.87 (98)	3.97 (101)	4.34 (110)	4.66 (118)	4.15 (105)	3.82 (97)	3.79 (96)	3.33 (85)	4.14 (105)	46.60 (1,184)
Average snowfall inches (cm)	9.1 (23)	10.1 (26)	5.6 (14)	0.5 (1.3)	0.0 (0.0)	0.0 (0.0)	0.0 (0.0)	0.0 (0.0)	0.0 (0.0)	0.2 (0.51)	0.6 (1.5)	5.4 (14)	31.5 (80)
Average extreme snow depth inches (cm)	5.6 (14)	6.3 (16)	3.2 (8.1)	0.2 (0.51)	0.0 (0.0)	0.0 (0.0)	0.0 (0.0)	0.0 (0.0)	0.0 (0.0)	0.1 (0.25)	0.4 (1.0)	3.7 (9.4)	10.8 (27)
Average precipitation days (≥ 0.01 in)	10.6	10.0	10.9	11.5	11.4	10.9	10.0	9.8	8.7	9.4	8.8	11.1	123.1
Average snowy days (≥ 0.1 in)	4.6	3.8	2.7	0.3	0.0	0.0	0.0	0.0	0.0	0.0	0.3	2.8	14.5
Average relative humidity (%)	65.4	63.3	59.9	57.5	62.0	63.0	63.4	66.2	67.9	66.3	66.5	66.7	64.0
Average dew point °F (°C)	19.2 (−7.1)	20.5 (−6.4)	27.1 (−2.7)	35.2 (1.8)	47.7 (8.7)	57.0 (13.9)	62.2 (16.8)	62.4 (16.9)	56.1 (13.4)	44.6 (7.0)	35.2 (1.8)	24.8 (−4.0)	41.0 (5.0)
Average ultraviolet index	2	3	4	6	7	8	8	8	6	4	2	1	5
Source 1: NOAA (relative humidity and dew point 1961–1989)
Source 2: Weather Atlas (UV)

Climate data for Newark
Month	Jan	Feb	Mar	Apr	May	Jun	Jul	Aug	Sep	Oct	Nov	Dec	Year
Average sea temperature °F (°C)	41.7 (5.4)	39.7 (4.3)	40.2 (4.5)	45.1 (7.3)	52.5 (11.4)	64.5 (18.1)	72.1 (22.3)	74.1 (23.4)	70.1 (21.2)	63.0 (17.3)	54.3 (12.4)	47.2 (8.4)	55.4 (13.0)
Source: Weather Atlas

Climate data for Trenton, New Jersey (Trenton–Mercer Airport) 1991–2020 normals, extremes 1865–present
Month	Jan	Feb	Mar	Apr	May	Jun	Jul	Aug	Sep	Oct	Nov	Dec	Year
Record high °F (°C)	73 (23)	78 (26)	87 (31)	93 (34)	99 (37)	100 (38)	106 (41)	105 (41)	101 (38)	94 (34)	83 (28)	76 (24)	106 (41)
Mean maximum °F (°C)	62.7 (17.1)	62.7 (17.1)	74.2 (23.4)	83.0 (28.3)	88.6 (31.4)	93.4 (34.1)	96.3 (35.7)	94.3 (34.6)	89.7 (32.1)	81.4 (27.4)	72.0 (22.2)	64.2 (17.9)	97.2 (36.2)
Mean daily maximum °F (°C)	39.7 (4.3)	42.8 (6.0)	50.8 (10.4)	62.9 (17.2)	72.4 (22.4)	81.0 (27.2)	86.0 (30.0)	84.0 (28.9)	77.1 (25.1)	65.5 (18.6)	54.5 (12.5)	44.4 (6.9)	63.4 (17.4)
Daily mean °F (°C)	32.0 (0.0)	34.3 (1.3)	41.7 (5.4)	52.5 (11.4)	62.0 (16.7)	71.0 (21.7)	76.3 (24.6)	74.4 (23.6)	67.4 (19.7)	55.7 (13.2)	45.4 (7.4)	36.8 (2.7)	54.1 (12.3)
Mean daily minimum °F (°C)	24.3 (−4.3)	25.9 (−3.4)	32.7 (0.4)	42.1 (5.6)	51.6 (10.9)	60.9 (16.1)	66.6 (19.2)	64.8 (18.2)	57.7 (14.3)	45.9 (7.7)	36.3 (2.4)	29.3 (−1.5)	44.8 (7.1)
Mean minimum °F (°C)	7.2 (−13.8)	10.0 (−12.2)	17.9 (−7.8)	29.0 (−1.7)	37.7 (3.2)	48.3 (9.1)	57.0 (13.9)	54.4 (12.4)	43.2 (6.2)	31.6 (−0.2)	21.8 (−5.7)	14.8 (−9.6)	5.1 (−14.9)
Record low °F (°C)	−16 (−27)	−14 (−26)	0 (−18)	11 (−12)	31 (−1)	39 (4)	46 (8)	39 (4)	34 (1)	21 (−6)	9 (−13)	−8 (−22)	−16 (−27)
Average precipitation inches (mm)	3.29 (84)	2.63 (67)	3.97 (101)	3.63 (92)	3.99 (101)	4.25 (108)	4.39 (112)	4.22 (107)	4.09 (104)	3.79 (96)	3.18 (81)	4.04 (103)	45.47 (1,155)
Average snowfall inches (cm)	7.9 (20)	8.6 (22)	4.9 (12)	0.5 (1.3)	0.0 (0.0)	0.0 (0.0)	0.0 (0.0)	0.0 (0.0)	0.0 (0.0)	0.1 (0.25)	0.5 (1.3)	4.3 (11)	26.8 (67.85)
Average precipitation days (≥ 0.01 in)	10.1	10.1	11.0	11.5	12.0	11.9	10.8	10.0	8.6	10.0	8.5	11.0	125.5
Average snowy days (≥ 0.1 in)	4.6	4.3	2.6	0.3	0.0	0.0	0.0	0.0	0.0	0.0	0.3	2.3	14.4
Average relative humidity (%)	65.4	61.7	58.0	57.0	62.1	66.1	66.2	68.8	69.8	68.8	66.9	66.5	64.8
Average dew point °F (°C)	21.7 (−5.7)	22.8 (−5.1)	28.1 (−2.2)	37.7 (3.2)	48.7 (9.3)	59.4 (15.2)	63.9 (17.7)	63.5 (17.5)	57.0 (13.9)	45.6 (7.6)	35.9 (2.2)	26.5 (−3.1)	42.7 (5.9)
Mean monthly sunshine hours	163.1	169.7	207.4	227.2	248.1	262.8	269.2	252.5	215.0	201.5	149.3	140.1	2,505.9
Percentage possible sunshine	54	57	56	57	56	58	59	59	57	58	50	48	56
Source 1: NOAA (sun 1961–1981)
Source 2: PRISM Climate Group (humidity and dew point)
