= Plug-in electric vehicles in New Jersey =

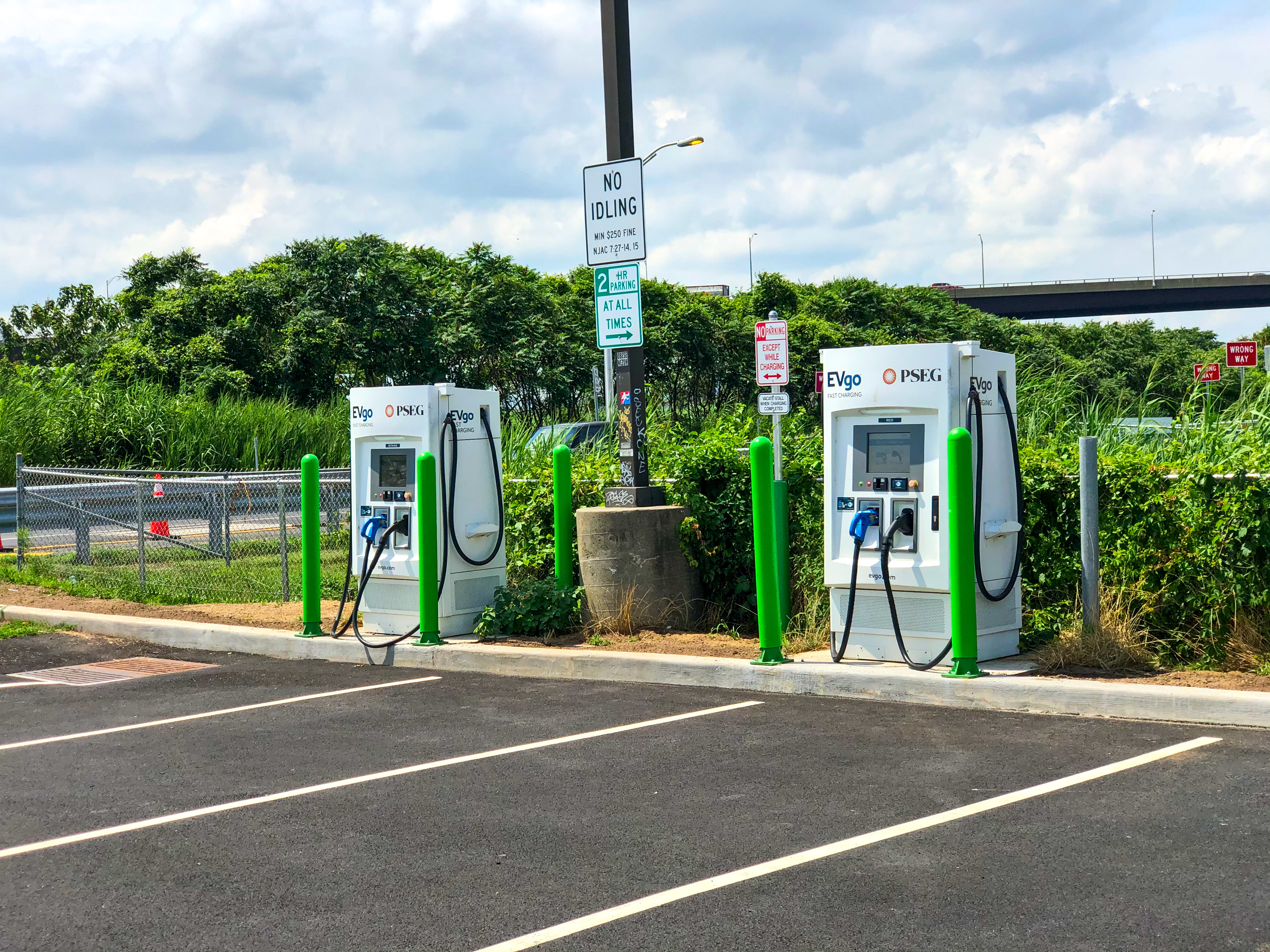
Electric Charging Station on the New Jersey Turnpike

As of December 2021, there were about 64,000 electric vehicles (including plug-in hybrid vehicles) in New Jersey. As of 2022, 5% of all new vehicles sold in the state were electric.

As of March 2022, there were 625 charging stations in New Jersey and the state had the lowest ratio of public charging stations to electric vehicles in the United States.

== Government policy ==
As of March 2022, the state government awards up to $5,000 in tax rebates for each electric vehicle purchase and offers other incentives such as exempting zero emission vehicles from state sales tax, and giving them HOV lane access and discounts on New Jersey Turnpike and Garden State Parkway tolls.

As of March 2022, New Jersey Transit plans to deploy its first electric buses in 2022, and transition 100% of its bus fleet to electric by 2040.

== Public opinion ==
A poll conducted in 2021 by Coltura showed that 58% of voters in New Jersey support requiring all new vehicles sold in the state to be electric by 2030.
