= Richard J. Sullivan (environmentalist) =

American environmental official (died 2013)

Richard J. Sullivan was an American engineer, political appointee, and environmentalist who was the first Commissioner of the New Jersey Department of Environmental Protection.

== Early life and education ==
Sullivan was born in Jersey City, New Jersey to Dennis and Mary Sullivan. After serving in the United States Navy from 1945 to 1946, he received a bachelor's of science degree in Mechanical Engineering from Stevens Institute of Technology, a masters of arts degree in English from Seton Hall University, and a master's degree in Public Health from Columbia University.

== Initial public service career ==
In 1950, Sullivan joined New Jersey state government as a public health engineer. He was a pioneer in early efforts to improve New Jersey's environment and was appointed Director of the new Division of Clean Air and Water, within the NJ Department of Health, in 1967.

== New Jersey Commissioner of Environmental Protection ==
In 1970, Governor William T. Cahill appointed Sullivan the first Commissioner of the New Jersey Department of Environmental Protection. Under his leadership at the DEP, New Jersey adopted sweeping protections of beaches, wetlands and the Meadowlands, expanded Green Acres land preservation efforts, and led efforts to pass clean air and water legislation that resulted in significant improvements in New Jersey's environment.

== Later career and death ==
After his career in state government, Sullivan served on the faculties at Princeton University and Stevens Institute, teaching environmental studies.

Following his university positions, Sullivan continued his strong advocacy of environmental causes. He co-founded New Jersey First, an environmental services firm of which he was president until 1999.

He also sat on numerous boards and commissions, including serving as chairman of the Pinelands Commission (appointed for successive terms by three governors) and president of the Fund for New Jersey.

Sullivan died on December 10, 2013, at his home in Wall Township, New Jersey.

== Legacy ==
Since 2000, the New Jersey Governor's Environmental Excellence Awards have been New Jersey's premier environmental awards program since 2000. Within these awards, the Richard J. Sullivan Award recognizes individuals who demonstrate exceptional leadership and outstanding accomplishment in safeguarding public health, protecting and enhancing New Jersey's diverse natural resources and creating vibrant, sustainable communities that provide economic opportunity for all, or have helped champion protective environmental justice legislation.

In 2001, Sullivan was recognized for his contributions to the Pinelands National Reserve with the dedication of the Richard J. Sullivan Center for Environmental Policy and Education at the Pinelands Commission headquarters.

In 2005, the Richard J. Sullivan Natural Area in Liberty State Park in Jersey City was named for him in recognition of over 50 years of dedication to improving New Jersey's environment.

In 2022, State Senator Jean Stanfield sponsored a bill that designated the NJDEP main office at 401 East State Street in Trenton as the Richard J Sullivan Building.
