= Jack Breit =

American artist from Florida

Jack Breit is an American artist from Florida. His work is part of the Leepa-Rattner Museum's permanent collection. Breit transitioned from photography to digital art. He curated the "Digital Fusion" art show at the Arts Center in downtown St. Petersburg in 2001. He had his first solo show in 1975 at the Beaux Arts Gallery in St. Petersburg, Florida. Breit is a 1969 graduate of the University of South Florida.
