= List of New Jersey state symbols =

List of official symbols of the State of New Jersey

List of state symbols
- Flag of New Jersey

- Seal of New Jersey

- Coat of arms of New Jersey
- Nickname: The Garden State
- Motto: Liberty and Prosperity
- Slogan: "New Jersey: Come See For Yourself"
- Song: None
- Foundation day: December 18, 1787

Living insignia
- Bird: Eastern goldfinch (Carduelis tristis)
- Butterfly: Black swallowtail butterfly
- Domestic animal: Seeing Eye Dog
- Fish: Brook trout (Salvelinus fontinalis)
- Flower: Common meadow violet (Viola sororia)
- Fruit: Blueberry (Vaccinium corymbosum)
- Insect: European honey bee (Apis mellifera)
- Mammal: horse (Equus caballus)
- Reptile: Bog turtle (Glyptemys muhlenbergii)
- Tree: Northern red oak (Quercus borealis maxima)
- Vegetable: Jersey tomato (Lycopersicon esculentum)

Inanimate insignia
- Color(s): Buff and Jersey Blue
- Dinosaur: Hadrosaurus foulkii
- Drink: Cranberry juice
- Folk dance: Square dance
- Mineral: Franklinite
- Shell: Knobbed whelk (Busycon carica gmelin)
- Ship: A. J. Meerwald
- Soil: Downer
- Other: Cryptid: Jersey Devil; Microbe: Streptomyces griseus; Memorial tree: Dogwood

State route marker

State quarter
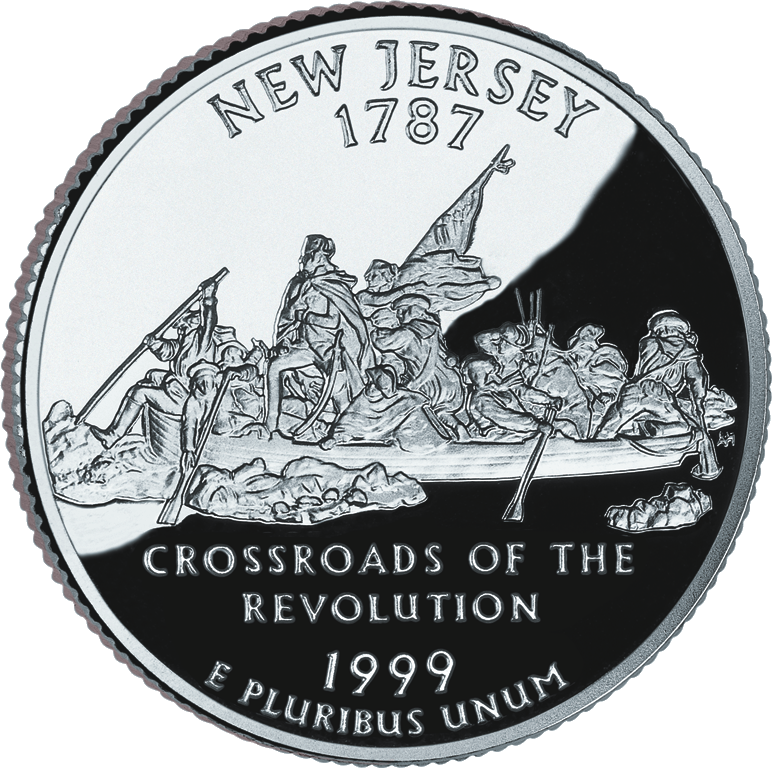
- Released in 1999

This is a list of official symbols of the U.S. state of New Jersey. Official symbols of New Jersey are codified in the laws of New Jersey.

== History ==
A decade-long campaign by a Haddon Township teacher led to the selection of Hadrosaurus foulkii as the official state fossil in June 1991. This example of the dinosaur was excavated in 1858 from a marl pit near Haddonfield as one of the most complete dinosaur skeletons to be reconstructed. It remains on display at the New Jersey State Museum, where it has been on display since 1931.

In what The New York Times described as a "food fight", Assemblymember Clare Farragher argued in 2003 that the tomato has a strong historical association with the Garden State and that "the Jersey tomato does have a unique taste" that derives from the characteristics of the soil on the Atlantic coast. Legislation ultimately passed in 2003 establishing the blueberry as New Jersey's official state fruit.

In online balloting, "New Jersey: Come See For Yourself" was selected by the 11,000 participants in 2006 as the winner, from a slogan originally submitted by a resident of Passaic, New Jersey. The Governor of New Jersey announced the new slogan in January 2006, after having previously rejected the slogan "We'll Win You Over", which had been developed by an advertising agency at the cost of $250,000 and was deemed to be "too negative and prone to ridicule". "Come See For Yourself" edged out second-place finisher "New Jersey: The Best Kept Secret" by approximately 100 votes.

On May 10, 2019, New Jersey became the second state in the United States to have an Official State Microbe, the bacterium Streptomyces griseus.

On January 21, 2020, New Jersey Governor Phil Murphy signed legislation that officially designates the Seeing Eye dog as the state dog of New Jersey.

On August 7, 2023, Senate President Nicholas Scutari, in his capacity as acting governor, signed a bill designating cranberry juice as New Jersey's state juice. The legislation was enacted after a successful proposal from Cinnaminson Township fourth grade students.

== See also ==
- List of New Jersey-related topics
- Lists of United States state insignia
