= Bettina Bedwell =

American journalist and fashion illustrator (1889–1947)

- Bettina Bedwell in the Tuileries Garden, circa 1937
- Born: January 13, 1889; Broken Bow, Nebraska
- Died: April 29, 1947 (aged 58); New York City, New York
- Occupations: journalist and fashion designer
- Spouse: Abraham Rattner (m. 1924)

Bettina Bedwell (January 13, 1889 – April 29, 1947) was an American journalist and fashion illustrator. She reported on fashion from Paris throughout the 1920s and 30s.

== Early life and education ==
Bettina Bedwell was born in Broken Bow, Nebraska on January 13, 1889. Her parents were Walter C. and Emma Moore Bedwell. She attended school in Denver and then studied at the Art Institute of Chicago.

== Mid-life and career ==
Bedwell moved to Paris in 1921 or 1922. She began reporting on fashion for the Chicago Tribune-New York News Syndicate in 1924. That year she also married Abraham Rattner, an American painter, in Paris.^{: 268}

In 1929, American author Kay Boyle began working for Bedwell as a "secretary." Boyle wrote to her family saying that the work included writing fashion articles for the Chicago Tribune, which appeared under Bedwell's name. Boyle and Bedwell became friends, continuing to work together and visit each other into the 1940s.^{: 164-5}

From 1929 until 1940, Bedwell was a "style spy" for Margaret Hayden Rorke of the Textile Color Card Association of the United States. Bedwell wrote weekly letters to Rorke, reporting on the color trends she saw on the streets, in restaurants, and in the couture houses of Paris. Her letters were often full of swatches and color samples. Rorke used Bedwell's letters and swatches to enhance her own color forecasting in the U.S.

Bedwell understood the pirating of Paris fashions well. She had reported on fashion bootlegging and "style pirates" in a 1930 article that appeared in the New York Times. Bedwell's own columns were sometimes accompanied by sewing patterns that copied the Parisian styles she reported on. Bedwell later put this knowledge to use in outlining a novel, Yellow Dusk (Hurst & Blackett, 1937), a thriller about drug smuggling and fashion theft set in a Paris couture house. The novel appeared under Bedwell's name, but it was ghostwritten from her outline by Kay Boyle, who was paid $250.

== Later life and death ==
Bedwell and Rattner left Paris in late 1939 to avoid the Nazi invasion. They settled in New York where Bedwell later died due to a kidney infection on April 29, 1947.
