= Coat of arms and flag of New Jersey =

U.S. state coat of arms and flag

Coat of arms of the State of New Jersey

Versions
- Great Seal of the State of New Jersey
- Armiger: State of New Jersey
- Adopted: 1777; 249 years ago (modified 1928)
- Crest: Upon a helm Or, a horse's head cabossed proper.
- Torse: Argent and azure, the mantling azure doubled argent.
- Shield: Azure; per pale three ploughs proper.
- Supporters: In dexter the goddess Liberty affronté carrying in her dexter hand a pole, proper, surmounted by a cap gules, with band azure at the bottom, displaying on the band six stars, argent; in sinister the goddess Ceres affronté bearing a cornucopia Or bearing apples, grapes, and plums proper
- Motto: Liberty and Prosperity
- Designer: Pierre Eugene du Simitiere

Flag of New Jersey
- Use: State flag
- Proportion: 3:5
- Adopted: May 11, 1896; 130 years ago
- Design: The state coat of arms centered on a buff colored field.

The coat of arms of New Jersey was adopted in 1777 and modified in 1928. It depicts a shield with three plows flanked by two women. Above the shield is a horse's head atop a knight's helmet. Below everything is a banner that reads Liberty and Prosperity 1776. The state seal of New Jersey depicts the coat of arms on a white disc surrounded by the state name. The flag of New Jersey was adopted on May 11, 1896. It features the coat of arms on a buff field.

== Coat of arms ==
=== Design ===
The coat of arms of the state of New Jersey includes:

- A shield with three plows, representative of New Jersey's agricultural tradition.
- A forward-facing helmet, representing state sovereignty.
- A horse's head as the crest of the helmet, representing speed and strength.
- The female figures Liberty and Ceres, representative of the state's motto (see next item). Liberty is holding a staff supporting a stylized Phrygian cap, a symbol of rebellion by patriots in the colonies; Ceres is holding an overflowing cornucopia.
- The streamer at the foot of the emblem contains the state motto of New Jersey, "Liberty and Prosperity", and the year of statehood, 1776.

The coat of arms contains a horse's head; beneath that is a helmet, showing that New Jersey governs itself, and it has three plows on a shield to highlight the state's agriculture tradition, which shows why the state has the nickname “Garden State.” The two Goddesses represent the state motto, “Liberty and Prosperity.” Liberty is on the left. She is holding a staff with a liberty cap on it, and the word “LIBERTY” is underneath her. The goddess on the right is Ceres, goddess of agriculture. She is holding a cornucopia with the word “PROSPERITY” written below her.

=== History ===
The coat of arms of New Jersey was originally designed by Pierre Eugene du Simitiere in 1777 and was modified slightly in 1928.

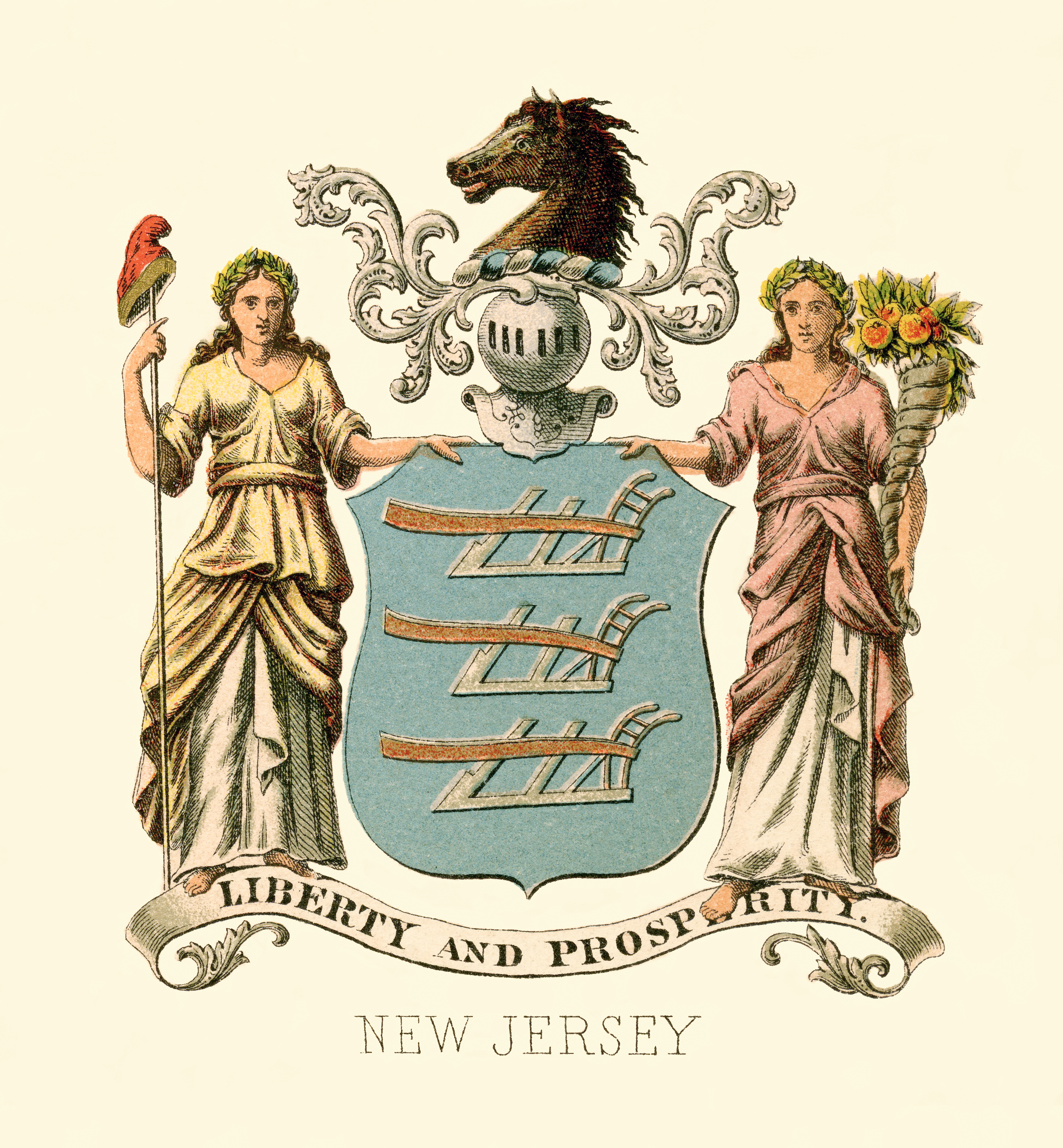
New Jersey state historical coat of arms (illustrated, 1876)

=== State seal ===
The seal is described in New Jersey statute Title 52, §2-1:

The great seal of this state shall be engraved on silver, which shall be round, of two and a half inches in diameter and three-eighths of an inch thick; the arms shall be three ploughs in an escutcheon, azure; supporters, Liberty and Ceres. The Goddess Liberty to carry in her dexter hand a pole, proper, surmounted by a cap gules, with band azure at the bottom, displaying on the band six stars, argent; tresses falling on shoulders, proper; head bearing over all a chaplet of laurel leaves, vert; overdress, tenne; underskirt, argent; feet sandaled, standing on scroll. Ceres: Same as Liberty, save overdress, gules; holding in left hand a cornucopia, or, bearing apples, plums and grapes surrounded by leaves, all proper; head bearing over all a chaplet of wheat spears, vert. Shield surmounted by sovereign's helmet, six bars, or; wreath and mantling, argent and azure. Crest: A horse's head, proper. Underneath the shield and supporting the goddesses, a scroll azure, bordered with tenne, in three waves or folds; on the upper folds the words "Liberty and Prosperity"; on the under fold in Arabic numerals, the figures "1776". These words to be engraved round the arms, viz., "The Great Seal of the State of New Jersey".

In 2015 a circular letter issued by the State of New Jersey Department of the Treasury addressed the issue of unapproved and incorrect versions of "The Great Seal of the State of New Jersey". Many incorrectly show the underskirt in blue and not argent.

== State flag ==
=== History ===
Unofficial flags (before 1896)

Digital reconstruction of state flag from 1854

In 1854, the first state flag was displayed over statehouse. It was very similar to the American flag. It had 13 stripes of red and white containing a blue canton with the state's coat of arms in the middle bearing 31 stars around it.

During the Civil War, state troops carried with them regimental flags bearing the states coat of arms. After the war a new state flag was adopted by the house. The flag was similar to the 1854 flag. It was an American flag but with no stars instead it bore the coat of arms of the state. The flag was only flown on during sessions of the legislature and holidays.

Digital reconstruction of state flag made after the Civil War

A state flag was displayed at the Battle of Kings Mountain Centennial in South Carolina, on October 7, 1880. Its design is unknown.

On June 28, 1884 a state flag bearing the coat of arms of state was raised over the Freehold's Court-House.

In 1889, Governor Green flew a state flag from his yacht Meteor. It was never described.

In 1891, a state flag was flown in front of Governor Leon Abbett mansion. In May of 1893, it was described as bearing the coat of arms of the state on its field.

In October of 1893, a huge party was being held in the city of Trenton celebrating the unveiling of the Trenton Battle Monument. The whole city was patriotically decorated, inside the state house hung some state flags belonging to the 13 original colonies. Raised high above the state flags was a National flag with the state coat of arms surround by 13 stars in the canton.

In April of 1894, the state house constructed a new 75 foot flag pole and ordered a new state flag to be on it. The flag had the same design of post-Civil War one.

Official flags (1896–present)

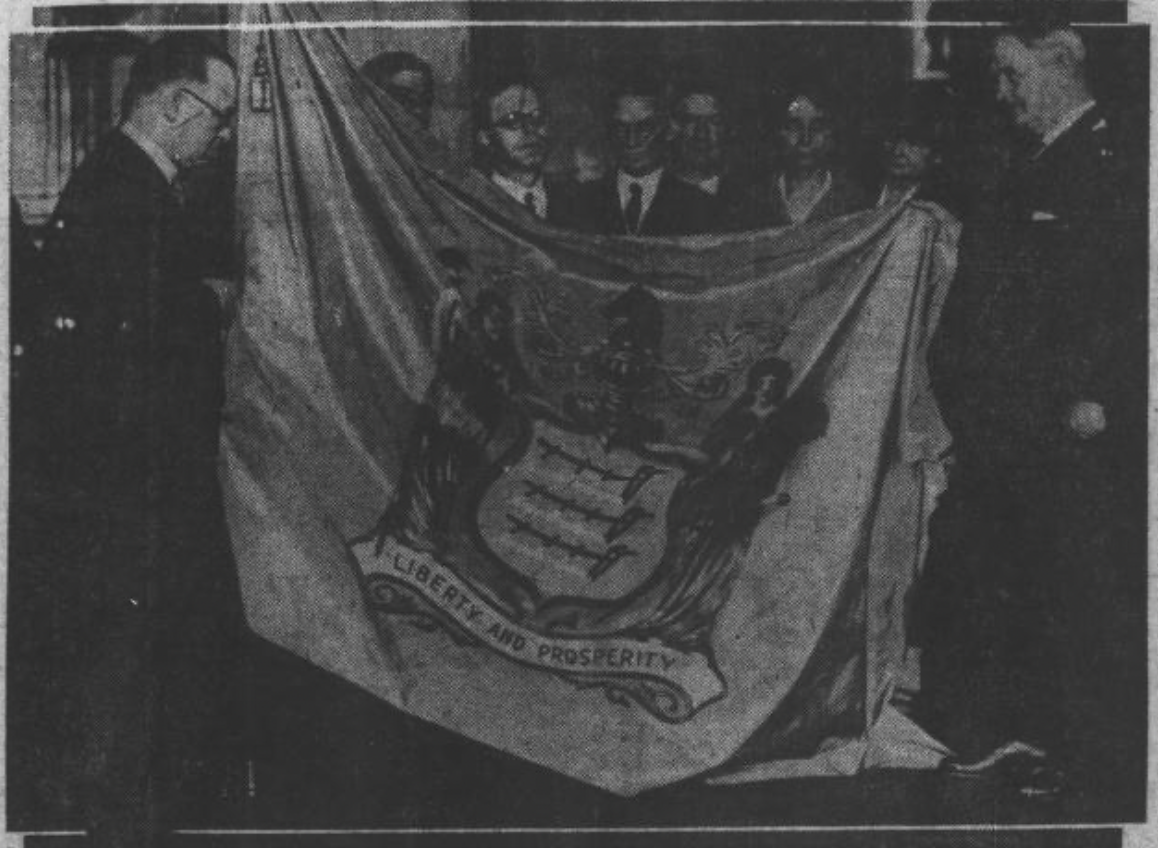
State flag from 1925

Ideas for adopting of a state flag started in 1894. According to the minutes of the New Jersey General Assembly for May 11, 1896, the date on which the Assembly officially adopted the flag, the buff color is due indirectly to George Washington, who had ordered on September 14, 1779, that the uniform coats of the New Jersey Continental Line be dark (Jersey) blue, with buff facings. Buff-colored facings had until then been reserved only for his own uniform and those of other Continental generals and their aides. Then, on February 14, 1780, the Continental War Officers in Philadelphia directed that the uniform coat facings of all regiments were to be the same as the background color of the regiments' state flag.

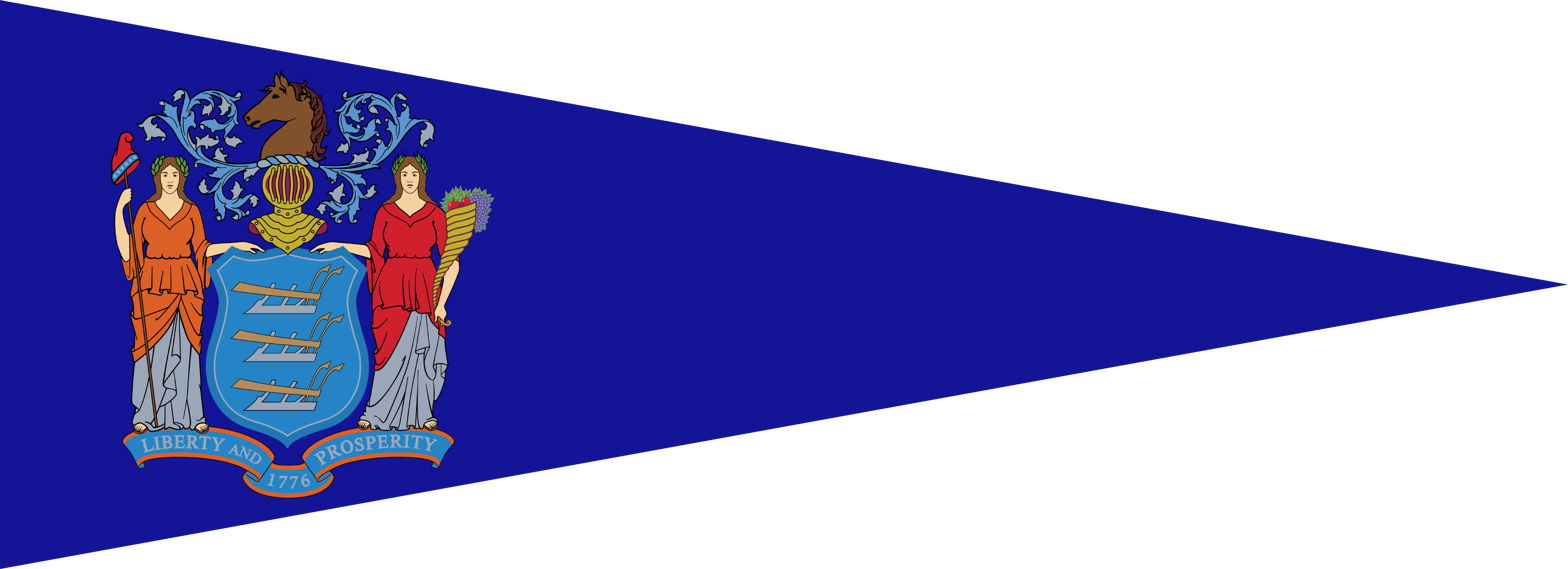
Digital reconstruction of New Jersey's Naval Militia flag, 1902

Digital reconstruction of state flag flown outside Governor Woodrow Wilson's residence, 1912

In 1902, Commander Washington Irving of state Naval Militia flew the Militia's pennant from the USS Portsmouth, which caused a controversy with US Naval command who ordered the pennant down from the masthead. The flag was later allowed to fly again. It was described as having a blue field with state coat of arms in the middle.

On the night of September 23, 1912 three men drove to Governor Woodrow Wilson's mansion. Their plan was to steal the state flag flying from flag pole in front, but the sound of the car woke up the Governor's son-in-law who went outside to confronted the thieves. The men instantly ran when they saw him and made it back to their car then drove off. The state flag was described as being similar to National flag but with the state's coat of arms in the canton instead of stars. The whole thing measured around 12 feet (3.6 m) wide and 20 feet (6 m) long.

In 1914, the Sons of the American Revolution held a large party in Newark celebrating George Washington wedding to Martha. During the event the state flag was presented to the society. The flag had a pain blue field with the state coat of arms in the center.

In 1920, President Woodrow Wilson went to Wildwood for a Veterans event. During the event a unique state flag was displayed. The flag had a yellow field with the state coat of arms in the middle.

=== Design ===
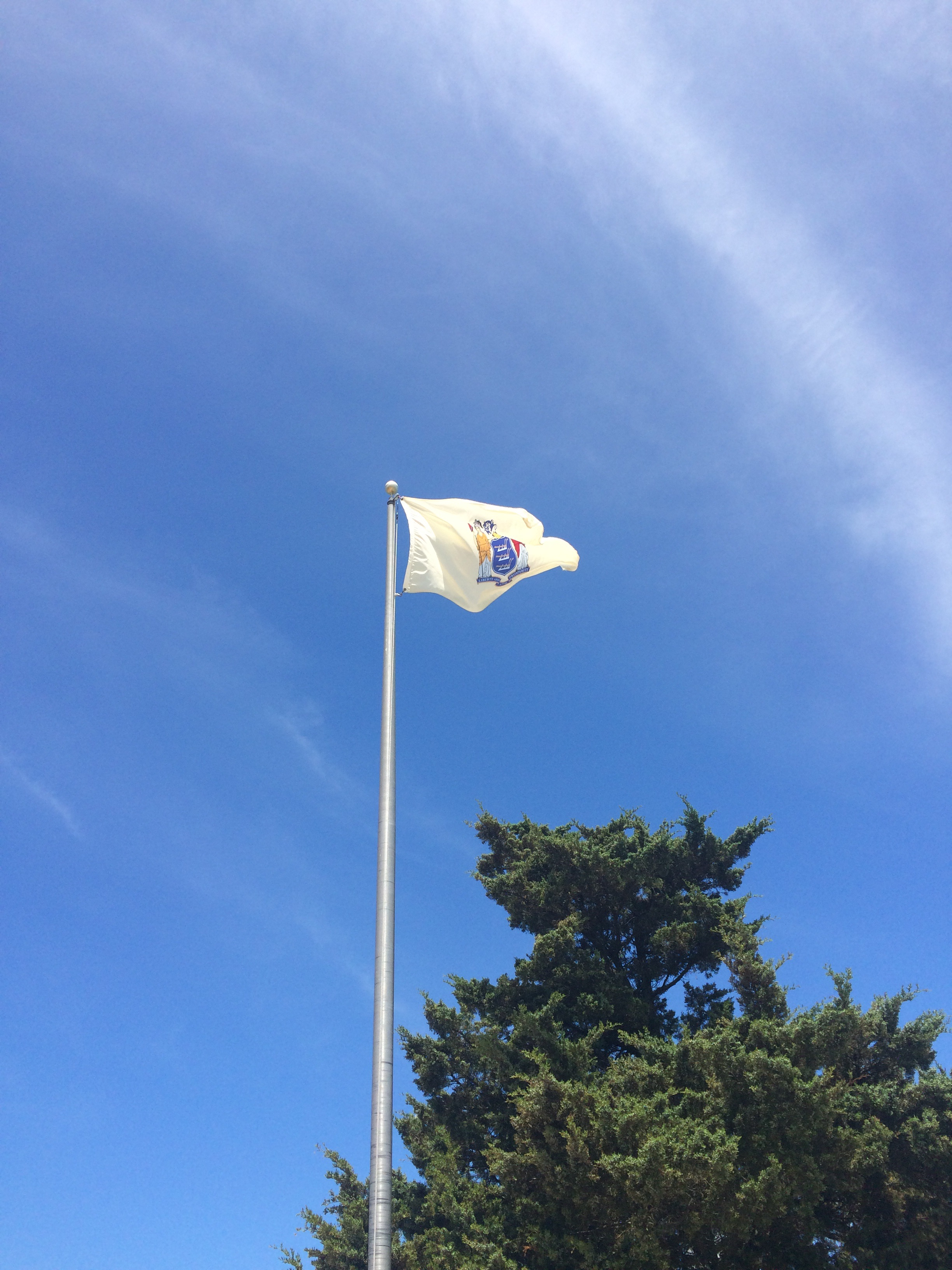
The flag of New Jersey near the bottom of the Cape May Lighthouse

The flag of the state of New Jersey includes the coat of arms of the state on a buff-colored background. In a 1965 law, the specific color shades of Jersey blue and buff were defined by the state. Using the Cable color system developed by the Color Association of the United States, Jersey Blue was defined as Cable No. 70087; Buff was defined as Cable No. 65015. The Office of the Secretary of State of New Jersey gives the blue and buff color hexadecimal equivalents as #2484C6 and #E1B584, respectively.

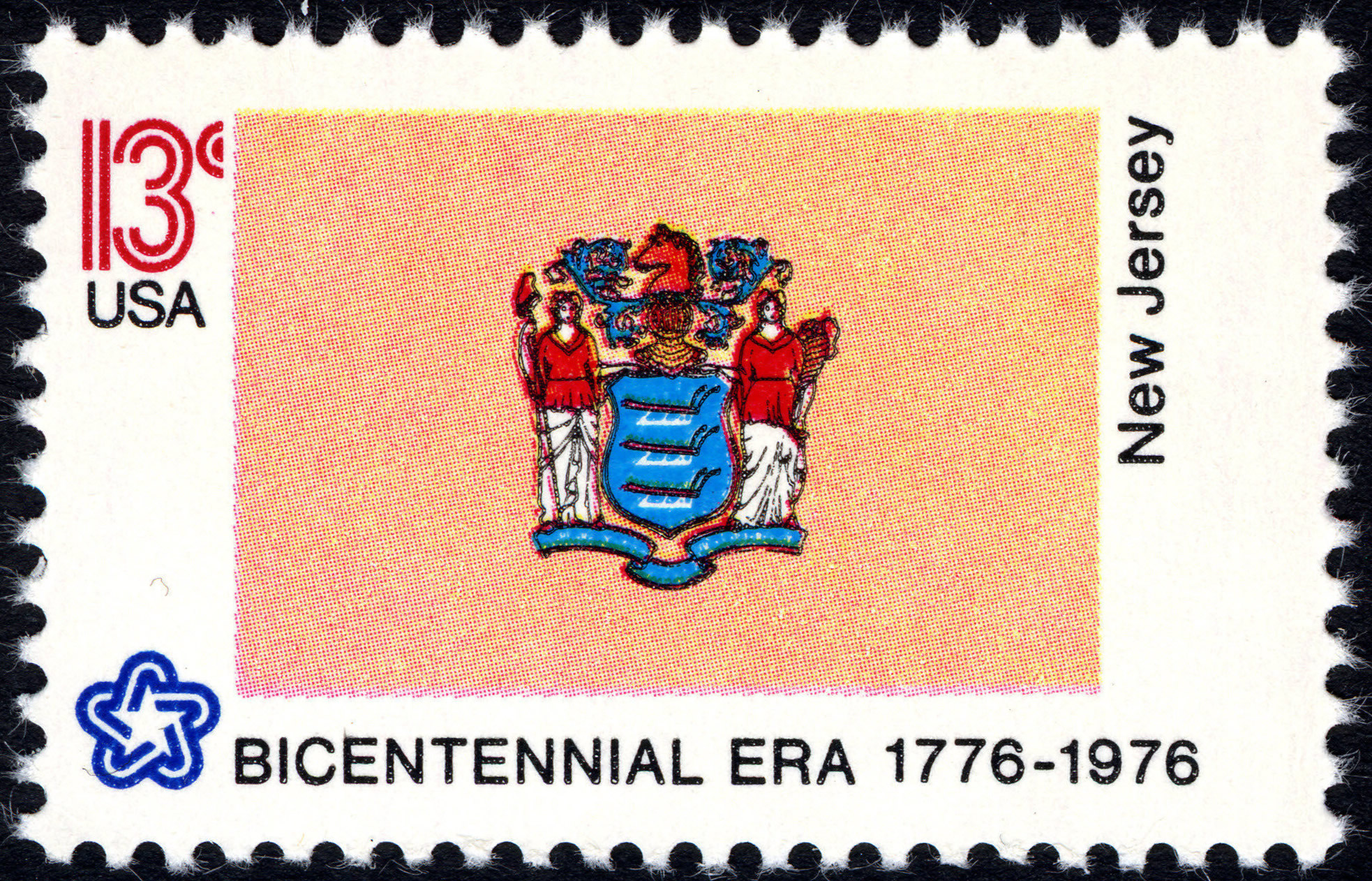
The New Jersey state flag as depicted in the 1976 bicentennial postage stamp series.

=== Flag proposals ===
NJ Advance Media and NJ.com ran a contest in 2016 to create a new flag for New Jersey, with nearly 400 designs being submitted. A panel of five judges narrowed the submissions down to ten finalists, which were then put to a public vote, with the official result based on the number of votes each design had after voting closed on March 6.

A winning design by Andrew Maris of Fair Haven was chosen, but no legislative action has been taken to authorize a new flag.

Winner - Andrew Maris

Third place - C. Erickson

Fourth place - Marmocet

Sixth place - Andrew Zega

Seventh place - Andrew Jones

Eighth place - Kenneth Huang

Ninth place - Dave Martucci

Tenth place - Joe Conklin

=== Other flags ===
Flag of the Port Authority of New York and New Jersey

New Jersey Tricentennial Flag, designed in 1964 to commemorate the 300th anniversary of the establishment of the Province of New Jersey

== Government seals of New Jersey ==
Seal of the New Jersey State Police

Seal of the attorney general of New Jersey

Seal of the New Jersey Department of Transportation

Seal of the New Jersey Board of Public Utilities

Seal of the New Jersey Turnpike Authority

== See also ==
- List of New Jersey state symbols
- Broad Seal War
