= Allen Leepa =

American artist, author, and educator

- Born: January 9, 1919; Brooklyn, New York
- Died: June 26, 2009 (aged 90); New Port Richey, Florida
- Education: Columbia University; Hans Hoffman School
- Known for: Modern Art

Allen Leepa (1919–2009) was an American artist, author, and educator from Michigan and Florida. He was born on January 9, 1919, in Brooklyn, New York, and died on June 26, 2009, in New Port Richey, Florida. He was a benefactor of the Leepa-Rattner Museum of Art and some of his works are included in its permanent collection. Esther Gentle was his mother and Abraham Rattner was his stepfather. He studied at the Hans Hoffman School and the Bauhaus School of Design. His art includes abstract paintings, lithographs, sculptures and sketches. He won a Childe Hassam Prize from the American Academy of Arts and Letters.

Leepa was an art professor at Michigan State University in East Lansing from 1945 until 1983. He earned a Master of Fine Arts and Doctor of Education degrees from Columbia University. The author of an art textbook, The Challenge of Modern Art, Leepa described art as an expression of humanity. Modern art helps to "reflect and find the form for a new kind of humanism in the world today by showing that creative expression and self-discovery can offer a basis for moral values."

== Personal life ==
His mother was Esther Gentle, a New York City sculptor, painter, printmaker, and gallery manager.
