= TCCA =

TCCA may refer to:

- Color Association of the United States, formerly known as Textile Color Card Association
- Transport Canada's Civil Aviation
- Toronto City Centre Airport (Billy Bishop Toronto City Airport)
- Trichloroisocyanuric acid
- Texas Court of Criminal Appeals
- Technical Committee on Computer Architecture, an IEEE group that supports and promotes research and events
