= Esther Gentle =

American artist

Esther Gentle Rattner
- Born: Esther Gentle; 1899; Brooklyn, New York
- Died: 1991 (aged 91–92)
- Known for: Sculpture
- Spouse: Abraham Rattner (m. 1949–1978)

Esther Gentle (1899 – 1991) was a New York City sculptor, painter, printmaker, and gallery manager. Gentle ran an art reproductions business, Esther Gentle Reproductions, and a New York City art gallery. Her work is part of the Leepa-Rattner Museum of Art's permanent collection.

Gentle was the first American woman sculptor given a one-person show at the Musée d’Art Moderne in Paris.

Esther Gentle and Abraham Rattner's papers were donated to the Archives of American Art, Smithsonian Institution.

== Personal life ==
She married Abraham Rattner in 1949. She was the mother of Dr. Allen Leepa. In 1921, prior to her Rattner marriage, she gave birth to twins Herbert (1921-2008) and Bernard Zipkin (1921-2016), by Harry Zipkin, a Brooklyn painter.

== Exhibitions ==
- 1963 Salon des Indépendants
- 1988 Ageless Perceptions, SOHO20
