= Hayden Rorke =

American actor (1910–1987)

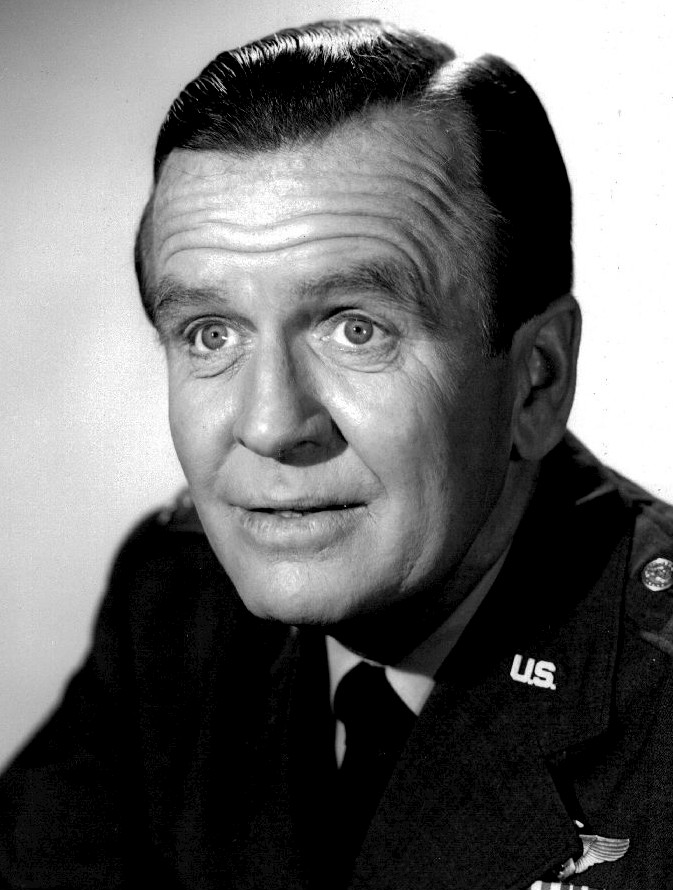
- as Dr. Bellows on I Dream of Jeannie
- Born: William Henry Rorke; October 23, 1910; Brooklyn, New York, U.S.
- Died: August 19, 1987 (aged 76); Toluca Lake, California, U.S.
- Resting place: Holy Cross Cemetery, Culver City, California, U.S.
- Years active: 1943–1985
- Partner: Justus Addiss
- Mother: Margaret Hayden Rorke

William Henry Rorke (October 23, 1910 – August 19, 1987), known professionally as Hayden Rorke, was an American actor best known for playing Colonel Alfred E. Bellows on the 1960s American sitcom I Dream of Jeannie.

== Early life ==
Rorke was born in Brooklyn, New York in 1910. He was the son of screen and stage actress Margaret Hayden Rorke, (Note: Rorke's obituary in the Los Angeles Times says, "His mother ... was a longtime textile industry figure and created colors used in the inaugural ball gowns of both Eleanor Roosevelt and Mamie Eisenhower.") and he took his stage name from her maiden name.

Rorke attended Brooklyn Preparatory School, a Jesuit school, where he served as president of the Dramatics Society and the Student Government, and was a member of the Omega Gamma Delta Fraternity. He continued his education at the American Academy of Dramatic Arts and began his stage career in the 1930s with the Hampden Theatrical Company. During World War II, he enlisted in the United States Army, where he made his film debut in the musical This Is the Army starring Ronald Reagan, for which he was uncredited as the stage manager and as a soldier in the background.

== Acting career ==
Following the war, he left the Army and worked in small parts on Broadway, returning to Hollywood for the film Lust for Gold (1949), again uncredited. However, it was an opening, and in later films, beginning with Rope of Sand, he is listed in the credits, although he again shows up uncredited in the Metro-Goldwyn-Mayer films Kim (1950) and The Magnificent Yankee (1950), as well as a few other MGM films including Father's Little Dividend (1951) and the Academy Award-winning An American in Paris (1951). In 1952, he played the role of crooked businessman and murderer Arne Mason in episode #90, "Word of Honor", of the television series The Lone Ranger. He also appeared in episode #125, "The Perfect Crime", in 1953. He also went uncredited as Clark Kent's psychiatrist in the "Adventures of Superman" episode "The Face and the Voice", and continued to appear in small film roles.

In 1957, Rorke played Steve, a film agent, in the television series Mr. Adams and Eve. He appeared in several guest roles on television, including Colonel Farnsworth in the short-lived 1964 sitcom No Time for Sergeants, based on the Andy Griffith film of the same name, but starring Sammy Jackson. He also appeared in three episodes of Perry Mason between 1960 and 1963. In his first role, he played the title character, Jay Holbrook, in "The Case of the Flighty Father", as Walter Caffrey in "The Case of the Violent Vest", and as Gage McKinney in "The Case of the Surplus Suitor." Rorke also appeared in television programs such as I Love Lucy, The Twilight Zone, Thriller (where he also plays a psychologist), Peter Gunn, The Andy Griffith Show, Bonanza, Barnaby Jones, Mister Ed, Wonder Woman, The George Burns and Gracie Allen Show, The Beverly Hillbillies, and The Love Boat.

Rorke was best known for his role as Dr. Alfred E. Bellows, the Air Force colonel and NASA medical officer in the television sitcom I Dream of Jeannie. Bellows was constantly suspicious of Tony Nelson (Larry Hagman), an astronaut under Bellows' supervision, who often behaved strangely. Bellows was never able to discover the true reason for Nelson's odd behavior and the doctor usually ended up making himself look foolish in front of his own superiors. Rorke's final appearance was reprising his role in the television reunion movie I Dream of Jeannie... Fifteen Years Later (1985).

In the early 1980s, Rorke returned to the theater, making a number of live stage appearances. In May, 1980, he starred with Joan Caulfield at the old Showboat Dinner Theatre in St. Petersburg, Florida, in The Pleasure of His Company. He also acted in Mr. Roberts in St. Louis, Missouri.

== Personal life and death ==
Rorke's I Dream of Jeannie co-star Barbara Eden described him as a "prince" who was a good friend to all and always managed to keep up the spirits of the Jeannie cast, even in difficult circumstances.

Eden also wrote in her 2011 autobiography Jeannie Out of the Bottle that Rorke was "unashamedly gay," and that he lived with his partner, television director Justus Addiss (of Mister Ed, among others), for many years in Studio City, along with their menagerie of dogs, until Addiss' death on October 26, 1979. The couple would often invite the Jeannie cast over for parties.

In 1987, Rorke died of multiple myeloma at his home in Toluca Lake at the age of 76. He was interred beside his mother at Holy Cross Cemetery in Culver City. He was survived by two brothers.

== Television ==
- The Lone Ranger (1950) 1x35 "Bullets for Ballots"
- I Love Lucy (1952) 1x21 "New Neighbor" as Tom O'Brien
- Adventures of Superman (1953) 2x10 "The Face and the Voice"
- Cheyenne (1956) 2x2 "The Long Winter" as Major George Early
- The Burns and Allen Show (1957) 7x21 "Going to Palm Springs" as a psychologist
- Mr. Adams and Eve (1957–1958) regular cast as Steve
- Steve Canyon (1959) "The Search" as Senator 'Smitty' Smith
- Perry Mason (1960) 3x26 "The Case of the Flighty Father" as Jay Holbrook and (1961) 4x24 "The Case of the Violent Vest" as Walter Caffrey
- The Twilight Zone (1961) 2x16 "A Penny For Your Thoughts" as Mr. Sykes
- Target: The Corruptors! (1961) 1x11 "Silent Partner" as Smith, and (1962) 1x30 License to Steal
- The Beverly Hillbillies (1963) 1x36 "Jethro's Friend" as Wilkins
- The Adventures of Ozzie and Harriet (1963) "Publicity For The Fraternity" as Professor Pauley
- Petticoat Junction (1964) 1x33 "A Millionaire for Kate" as H.J. Grant
- I Dream of Jeannie (1965-1970) regular cast as Dr. Alfred Bellows (129 episodes)
- Cannon (1975) 5x02 "The Deadly Conspiracy" as Knox
- The Love Boat (1977) 1x08 "The Understudy" as Mr. Humbertson

== Partial filmography ==
- This Is the Army (1943) - Soldier / Stage Manager (uncredited)
- Lust for Gold (1949) - Floyd Buckley (uncredited)
- Rope of Sand (1949) - Ingram
- Sword in the Desert (1949) - Capt. Beaumont
- Kim (1950) - Major Ainsley (uncredited)
- The Magnificent Yankee (1950) - Graham (uncredited)
- Inside Straight (1951) - Carlson
- Father's Little Dividend (1951) - Dr. Andrew Nordell
- Double Crossbones (1951) - Malcolm Giles
- Francis Goes to the Races (1951) - Rogers
- The Prince Who Was a Thief (1951) - Basra
- The Law and the Lady (1951) - Tracy Collans
- An American in Paris (1951) - Tommy Baldwin (uncredited)
- When Worlds Collide (1951) - Dr. Emery Bronson
- Starlift (1951) - Chaplain
- Room for One More (1952) - The Doctor (scenes deleted)
- Wild Stallion (1952) - Maj. Cullen
- Skirts Ahoy! (1952) - Doctor
- Above and Beyond (1952) - Dr. Ramsey
- Rogue's March (1953) - Maj. Fallow
- The Story of Three Loves (1953) - Mr. Thomas Clayton Campbell, Sr. (segment "Mademoiselle") (uncredited)
- The Stars Are Singing (1953) - Congressman Nolte (uncredited)
- Confidentially Connie (1953) - Prof. Simmons
- The Girl Next Door (1953) - Henry Fields
- South Sea Woman (1953) - Prosecution Lt. Fears
- Project Moonbase (1953) - General Greene
- The Robe (1953) - Caluus - Slave Auction Bidder (uncredited)
- Lucky Me (1954) - Tommy Arthur
- Drum Beat (1954) - President Ulysses S. Grant
- The Eternal Sea (1955) - Capt. William Buracker
- All That Heaven Allows (1955) - Dr. Dan Hennessy
- Tip on a Dead Jockey (1957) - J.R. Nichols (uncredited)
- This Happy Feeling (1958) - Mr. Booth
- The Restless Years (1958) - Mr. Booth
- Stranger in My Arms (1959) - Marcus Beasley
- Pillow Talk (1959) - Mr. Conrad
- I Aim at the Stars (1960) - U.S. Army Major
- Midnight Lace (1960) - Dr. Garver
- Parrish (1961) - Tom Weldon
- Tammy Tell Me True (1961) - Joshua Welling
- Back Street (1961) - Charley Claypole
- Pocketful of Miracles (1961) - Police Captain Moore
- Spencer's Mountain (1963) - Colonel Coleman
- The Thrill of It All (1963) - Billings
- The Unsinkable Molly Brown (1964) - Malcolm Broderick
- A House Is Not a Home (1964) - Bill Cameron
- I'd Rather Be Rich (1964) - MacDougall
- Youngblood Hawke (1964) - Mr. Givney
- The Night Walker (1964) - Howard Trent
- The Barefoot Executive (1971) - Clifford
- The Moneychangers (1976, TV Mini-Series) - Lewis Dorsey
- I Dream of Jeannie... Fifteen Years Later (1985, TV Movie) - Dr. Alfred Bellows
