= List of U.S. state colors =

Map of state colors in the United States. Official colors Officially proposed colors Unofficial colors, or unclear official status No known or officially no state colors

This is the official list of each state's colors.

== Arizona ==
Arizona's official colors are:

- Blue ("the same shade as that of the flag of the United States")
- Old gold

They were adopted in 1915.

== California ==
California's official colors are:

- Blue
- Gold

First used by the University of California, Berkeley in 1875, and officially adopted by the state in 1951, blue represents the sky and gold represents the California Gold Rush.

The colors are defined by several different standards in law:

- International Commission on Illumination:
  - Blue: Y 0.063 x 0.204 y 0.165
  - Gold: Y 0.449 x 0.474 y 0.458
- Munsell Renotation:
  - Blue: H V/C 7.3 PB 2.9/8.8
  - Gold: H V/C 2.0 Y 7.1/11.3
- Munsell Book Notation:
  - Blue: H V/C 7.2 PB 2.9/9.1
  - Gold: H V/C 1 Y 7.3/11

References:

- Color Association of the United States (Formerly Textile Color Card Association of New York, Inc.):
  - Blue: Yale Blue, cable number 70086, Standard Color Card of America, 9th edition.
  - Gold: Golden Yellow, cable number 65001, United States Army Card of Official Colors for Arms and Services.
- ISCC–NBS system:
  - Yale Blue: Deep purplish blue.
  - Golden Yellow: Vivid yellow.

== Delaware ==
Delaware's official colors are:

- Colonial blue
- Buff

Further, "colonial blue and buff, are designated by the Textile Color Card Association of the United States, Inc., New York, as 'arno blue' Cable No. 10663, and 'golden beige' Cable No. 10781 respectively; the color shades having been determined by Colorimetric Specifications of the National Bureau of Standards, United States Department of Commerce, in Test No. 2, 1/140565, dated November 18, 1954, which is on file with the Delaware Public Archives, Dover, Delaware."

== Hawaii ==
Hawaii does not have known official colors for the entire state. However, Hawaii has legislated an official color for each of its eight main islands:

- Red (Hawaiʻi)
- Pink (Maui)
- Golden yellow (Oʻahu)
- Purple (Kauaʻi)
- Green (Molokaʻi)
- Orange (Lānaʻi)
- White (Niʻihau)
- Gray (Kahoʻolawe)

In Pokémon Sun and Moon and Pokémon Ultra Sun and Ultra Moon, the Alola region, which is based on Hawaii, has each of its major natural islands named after the Hawaiian word for their respective base island's official color.

== Indiana ==
Indiana's official colors are:

- Blue
- Gold

== Louisiana ==
Louisiana's official colors are:

- Blue
- White
- Gold

They were adopted in 1972.

== Maryland ==
Maryland does not have known official state colors. Maryland's widely used unofficial colors are:

- Red
- White
- Black
- Gold

The colors come from the state flag, which in turn uses the Baltimore and Crossland crests of the Calvert family. Maryland flag imagery (and in turn, the four colors of the flag, in varying shades) are used extensively in official government branding.

== Massachusetts ==
Massachusetts's official colors are:

- Blue
- Green
- Cranberry

They were adopted in 2005. The colors represent Cape Cod Bay that the Pilgrims sailed over (blue), the Connecticut River Valley and the Berkshire mountains (green), and the state's cranberry industry which once produced 70 percent of the world's crop (cranberry)

== Minnesota ==
Minnesota does not have known official state colors.

Minnesota proposed in 2016 to make its official color

- Purple

in honor of the musician Prince; however, the motion did not succeed.

== Nevada ==
Nevada's official colors are:

- Silver
- Blue

Blue stands for Lake Tahoe and the mountain bluebird, while silver stands for the granite of the Sierra Nevada and the silver country of northern Nevada.

== New Hampshire ==
New Hampshire does not have known official state colors.

New Hampshire proposed in 2013 to make the colors

- Orange
- Red
- Yellow

its official state colors; however, the motion did not succeed.

== New Jersey ==
New Jersey's official colors are:

- Jersey Blue
- Buff

Using the Cable color system developed by the Color Association of the United States, Jersey Blue was defined as Cable No. 70087; Buff was defined as Cable No. 65015. The Office of the Secretary of State of New Jersey gives the blue and buff color hexadecimal equivalents as #2484C6 and #E1B584, respectively.

== New York ==
New York does not have known official state colors in law, but does define specific color shades in their official branding guide:

- Dark Blue
- Light Blue
- Gold

== North Carolina ==
North Carolina's official colors are:

- Red
- Blue

Specifically, the same shades "appearing in the North Carolina State flag and the American flag."

== Ohio ==
Ohio does not have known official state colors in law, but does define specific color shades in their official branding guide, inspired by the Flag of Ohio:

- Buckeye Blue
- Cardinal Red
- White

== Oklahoma ==
Oklahoma's official colors are:

- Green
- White

== Oregon ==
Oregon's official colors are:

- Navy blue
- Gold

They were adopted in 1959.

== Pennsylvania ==
Pennsylvania does not have known official state colors.

No official state colors are listed on the Commonwealth's State Symbols webpage, and no resolution or legislation designating state colors is known to exist.

Some sources erroneously cite blue and gold due to their prominence on the state license plate and the state flag, but these colors are coincidentally predominant on many current and historical US state license plates and on most blue "seal on a bedsheet" US state flags, including Pennsylvania's and at least 19 others.)

== South Carolina ==
South Carolina's official color is:

- Indigo blue

It was adopted in 2008.

== Vermont ==
Vermont does not have known official state colors.

Vermont proposed in 2007 to make the colors

- Green
- Gold

its official state colors; however, the motion did not succeed.

== Washington ==
Washington does not have known official state colors.

No official state colors are listed the state legislature's State Symbols webpage nor in Chapter 1.20 of the Revised Code of Washington (where other official symbols are designated). Some sources list dark green and gold/yellow, the two colors specified for the flag by law since 1925.

== West Virginia ==
West Virginia's official colors are:

- Old gold
- Blue

They were adopted in 1963.

== Wyoming ==
Wyoming does not have known official state colors.

Wyoming proposed in 2003 to make the colors

- Brown
- Yellow

its official state colors in honor of the University of Wyoming Cowboys 1980 football uniforms; however, the motion did not succeed.
