= Margaret Hayden Rorke =

American color standards expert, actress, and suffragist (1883–1969)

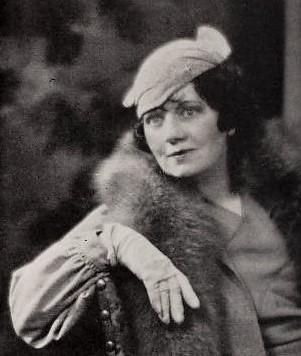
- c. 1936
- Born: Margaret Hayden; June 19, 1883; New York City, US
- Died: March 2, 1969 (aged 85); Los Angeles, California, US
- Occupations: Actress; businesswoman; activist
- Title: Managing director, Textile Color Card Association of the United States (1919–1954)
- Spouse: William Rorke (m. 1907; died 1941)
- Children: 4, including Hayden

Margaret Hayden Rorke (June 19, 1883 – March 2, 1969) was an American color standards expert, actress, and suffragist who was for nearly 40 years the managing director of the Textile Color Card Association of the United States. She is known as "the most influential 'color forecaster' of the 1920s and 30s."

== Early life ==
Margaret Nillie Hildegard Hayden was born in New York City on June 19, 1883 to William Richardson and Katherine Elizabeth (Farson) Hayden. Her father was a theatrical producer. She had a brief career as a theatrical actress under the name Marguerite Hayden, including a 1903 touring production of The Earl of Pawtucket and roles in A Romance of Athlone and Terence. On April 16, 1907, she married William Henry Rorke and stopped acting. The couple had four children (one of whom died in childhood), including the actor Hayden Rorke.

== Suffrage ==
In 1914, Rorke compiled and published Letters and Addresses on Woman Suffrage by Catholic Ecclesiastics. In her foreword, she explains that she was "prompted by the desire to correct the prevalent impression that the Catholic Church is officially opposed to Woman Suffrage."

== Career ==
Rorke was "the first professional color forecaster" and the managing director of the Textile Color Card Association of the United States (TCCA) for almost forty years. She joined the TCCA in 1918^{:91} and was appointed managing director in October 1919.^{:44}

Rorke helped standardize color in American manufacturing and influenced trends. At the suggestion of the chairman of the National Boot and Shoe Manufacturers Association's Styles Committee, Rorke published her first "Chart of Color Harmonies" in 1925.^{:166} By 1929, Rorke was working with the United States military to standardize colors for uniform fabrics and trim. She worked from 1926 to 1935 to standardize the colors of the American flag.^{:168–169}

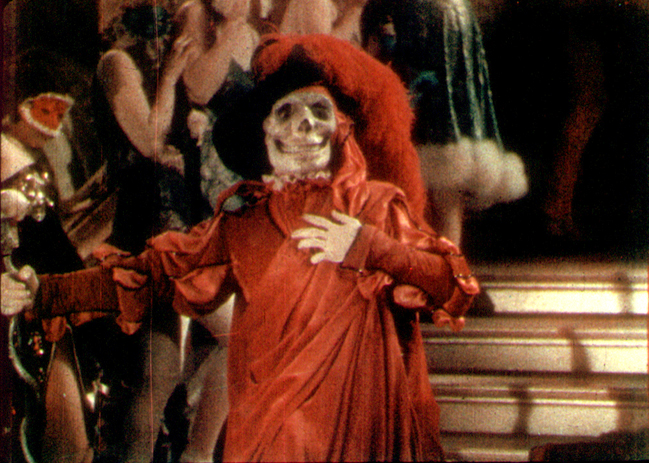
Rorke named "Phantom Red" after this scene in the Technicolor sequence from The Phantom of the Opera (1925)

Rorke employed "style spies" like Chicago Tribune foreign correspondent Bettina Bedwell, who kept her updated on Paris fashion trends for 11 years. Rorke and her team at TCCA incorporated the reports Bedwell sent into their own color forecasts, using the allure of Paris fashion to build the association's credibility.

Rorke advised industrial leaders in Manchester on setting up the British Colour Council.^{:53} In the U.S., Rorke was a founding member of the Inter-Society Color Council, promoting a "progressive model of cooperative associationism with designers, professors, and scientists who wanted to foster the free flow of color theories and methods."^{:188}

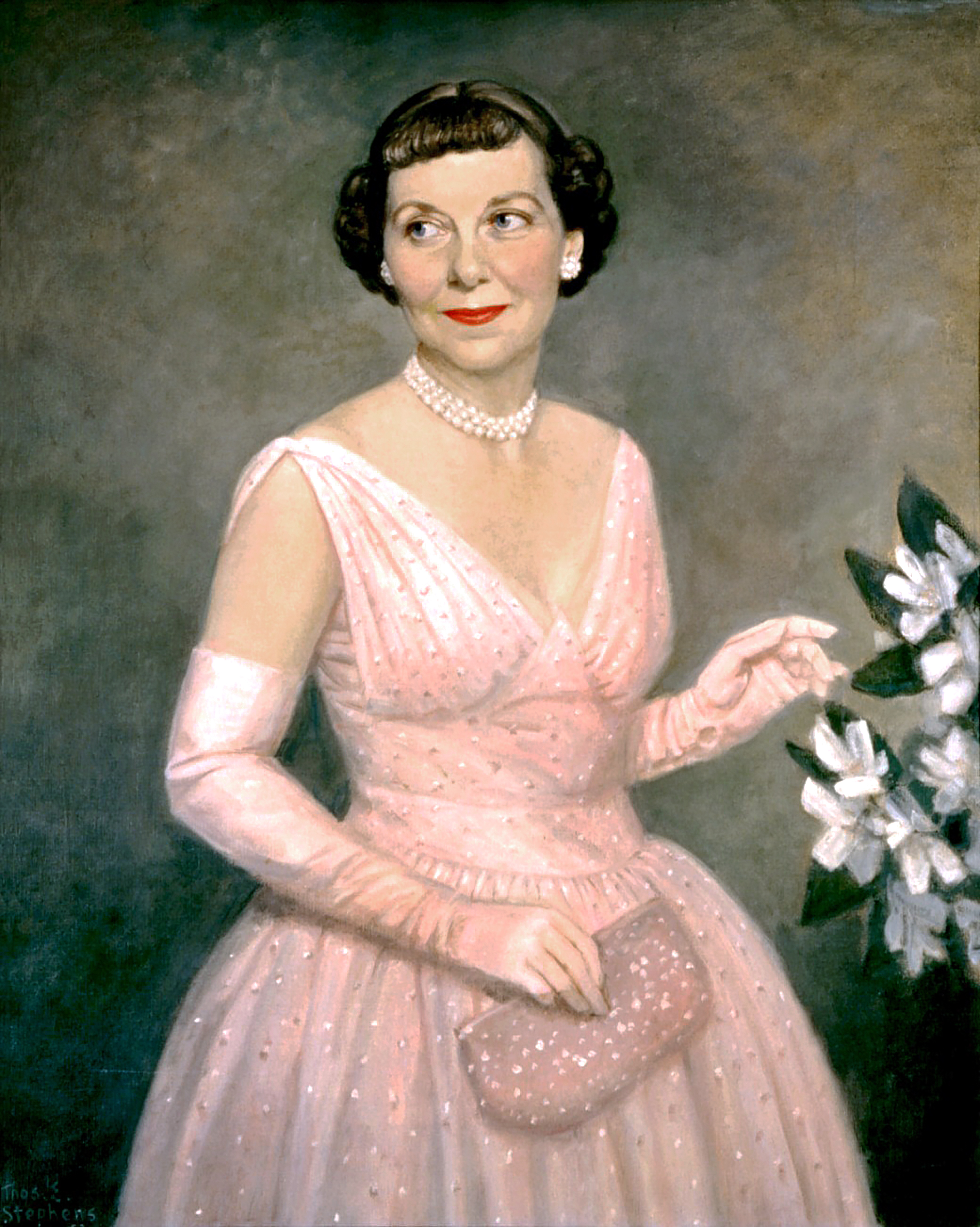
Mamie Eisenhower in "First Lady Pink," a color named by Margaret Hayden Rorke

Rorke also named colors, often tying names to notable cultural products or events. She named at least two colors—"Phantom Red" and "Sutter's Gold"—after films. In 1953, she "introduc[ed] a new color, First Lady Pink, which was the color of Mrs. [Mamie] Eisenhower's Inaugural Ball gown."

== Later years ==
Rorke retired from the TCCA in 1954^{:44} and moved to California shortly after. Her husband had died in 1941.Rorke died in Hollywood on March 2, 1969, at the age of 85. She was buried in Holy Cross Cemetery in Culver City.
