= Standard Color Reference of America =

The Standard Color Reference of America (and its supplement the U.S. Army Color Card) is a book of reference fabric swatches of different colors produced by The Color Association of the United States (CAUS), each color specified by “cable number” (and therefore sometimes known as cable colors). Until its 10th edition in 1981, the guide was called the Standard Color Card of America, and until 1955 the CAUS was called The Textile Color Card Association of the United States (TCCA). Thus, the guide was often referred to as the TCCA Color Card.

Among other uses, the American national flag and many state flags are officially specified based on the Standard Color Reference, as are those of a handful of other countries, such as the Philippines.

The Standard Color Reference of America was issued in 1915 for the purpose of simplifying color work by standardizing color for the U.S. The card offers a palette for color choice and at the same time help to facilitate the selection of colors. Primarily directed to the textile, fashion and environmental industries. It can be effectively used by everyone who has the responsibility of matching and combining colors. There are 16 pages of 12 colors each in the 10th edition. Each page offers a series of harmonious color combinations whether by color pairing or by groups. The Standard Color reference is a supplemented by a special U.S. Army Color Card showing, in silk ribbon form, the key shades of the U.S. Armed Forces, which are approved and accepted by the Quartermaster general. Like previously published editions, the new 1981 Standard reference presents a comprehensive palette for color choice and is a help to facilitate the selection and coordination of shades. Primarily directed to the fashion, textile and environmental industries. Note that the standards name or standard number will always signify the color so designated in this card. The names which have been adopted are purely descriptive and to be used only in such manner. In order to facilitate choice and coordination of colors, the pure silk samples have been arranged to afford the user a medium to visualize both the highlights and low-lights of each color. Therefore, when matching to a brilliant shiny surface use the satin side of the fabric; when matching to a dull surface use the flat side of the fabric.

— Tenth edition
