= Leepa-Rattner Museum of Art =

Art museum in Florida

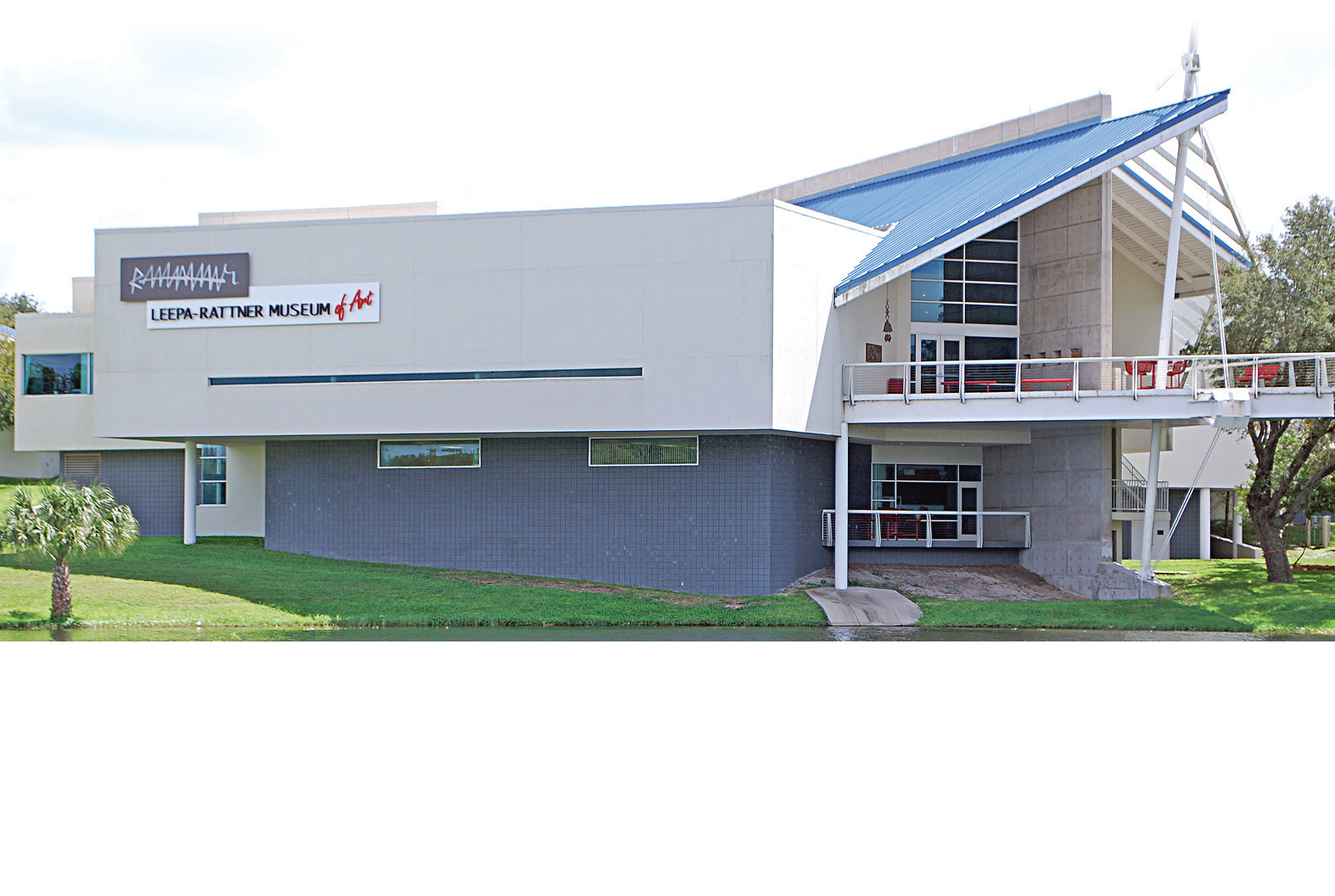

- Location of LRMA in Tarpon Springs Leepa-Rattner Museum of Art (the United States)
- Established: 22 January 2002
- Location: 600 Klosterman Road; Tarpon Springs Florida 34689; United States
- Coordinates: 28.12173°N 82.74651°W
- Type: Modern and Contemporary Art
- Director: Christine Renc-Carter
- Website: https://www.leeparattner.org/

The Leepa-Rattner Museum of Art (LRMA) is a modern and contemporary art museum located on the campus of St. Petersburg College in Tarpon Springs, Florida. The museum houses a permanent collection which includes paintings by Abraham Rattner and contemporary Florida sculpture including modern art by Abraham Rattner, Esther Gentle, and Allen Leepa, as well as by Rattner's contemporaries, Pablo Picasso, Henry Moore, Marc Chagall, Auguste Herbin, Georges Rouault, Hans Hofmann, and Max Ernst.

== History ==
The Leepa-Rattner Museum of Art was the result of a gift of art belonging to Allen Leepa (1919–2009) to the St. Petersburg College (then a two-year community college) in 1996. Leepa, a professor of art at Michigan State University from 1945 to 1983 and an abstract expressionist artist in his own right, was the stepson of Abraham Rattner (1893–1978) – a highly regarded 20th-century modern artist who was a friend and contemporary of Pablo Picasso and other early modernists in Paris in the 1920s and 1930s – and the son of Esther Gentle (1899–1991), a sculptor, painter, and printmaker. After his mother's death, Leepa inherited his stepfather's estate, which included works by Rattner and his contemporaries.

R. Lynn Whitelaw served as the museum's first director. He was succeeded by Victoria Cooke in 2011, Ann Larsen in 2013, Dr. Teresa Wilkins in 2019, and Christine Renc-Carter in 2022.

== Collection ==
The museum's 20th-century collection is made up of art from the estate of Abraham Rattner, donated by Allen and Isabelle Leepa, along with a collection of over 2,000 works of art by Rattner, Leepa, and Gentle which the Leepas had previously donated to the Tampa Museum of Art in 1997 and which the Tampa museum donated to the Leepa-Rattner Museum before the latter's opening. Rattner's retrospective works account for over 60% of the collection, including lithographs, tapestries, sculptures, clay works, paintings, and stained glass. Works by Pablo Picasso, Henry Moore, Marc Chagall, Max Ernst, and others are kept in storage and exhibited from time to time.

== Architecture ==
The museum was designed by Tampa architect Edward C. Hoffman Jr. and built by Creative Contractors, Inc. The interior of the museum resembles the bow of a ship, created by the effect of large skylights that sweep towards the rafters of the building. This image pays tribute to Tarpon Springs' fishing and sponge harvesting industries.

The 53,000 square feet (4,900 m^{2}) complex consists of three buildings in one – the museum, the Ellis Foundation Art Education Center, and the Michael M. Bennett Library – designed in such a way that the buildings appear as if they are pressed together. The Tampa Bay chapter of the American Institute of Architects presented the 2002 H. Dean Rowe FAIA Award of Excellence to Hoffman Architects for the museum design. On April 18, 2012, the American Institute of Architects' Florida Chapter placed the museum building on its list, "Florida Architecture: 100 Years. 100 Places."

== See also ==
Media related to Leepa-Rattner Museum of Art at Wikimedia Commons

- List of museums in Florida
