= Abraham Rattner =

American artist

- Born: July 8, 1895; Poughkeepsie, New York
- Died: February 14, 1978 (aged 84); New York, New York
- Known for: Painting
- Movement: Expressionism
- Spouses: Bettina Bedwell (m. 1924; died 1947); Esther Gentle (m. 1949)

Abraham Rattner (July 8, 1895 – February 14, 1978) was an American artist, best known for his richly colored paintings, often with religious subject matter. During World War I, he served in France with the U.S. Army as a camouflage artist.

== Early life ==
Rattner was born in Poughkeepsie, New York to a Russian-Jewish father and a Romanian-Jewish mother. He initially intended to be an architect, in pursuit of which he studied at George Washington University. Deciding instead to concentrate on painting, he then went on to study art at the Corcoran School of Art and the Pennsylvania Academy of the Fine Arts.

== Camouflage service ==
With the entry of the U.S. in World War I, Rattner was recruited to join the U.S. Army's American Camouflage Corps by that unit's commanding officer, Homer Saint-Gaudens, son of sculptor Augustus Saint-Gaudens (Behrens 2009). He was sent to France, where he was "promoted to sergeant, put in charge of camouflage research, and served at the front in the Second Battle of the Marne, Château-Thierry, Belleau Wood, and on the Hindenberg Line. He received a severe back wound which troubled him for the rest of his life" (Culkin 1980).

== Artist career ==
Rattner lived in Paris from 1920 until 1940, when he returned to New York City. He became known for his rich use of color and surrealist aspects of his work, which often pertained to religion. Although while living in Paris, he had met and studied the paintings of Claude Monet, his work is generally closer to that of Georges Rouault and Pablo Picasso. During World War II, he again volunteered for camouflage service, but was able to do very little (Culkin 1980). Later, he taught at several schools, including The New School, New York (1947–55), and Yale University, (1952–53).

== Personal life ==
In 1924, Rattner married an American art student and fashion illustrator named Bettina Bedwell, who later became the Paris fashion correspondent for the New York News-Chicago Tribune Syndicate. In 1947, she died suddenly from kidney infection. In 1949, he married Esther Gentle, a New York City sculptor, painter, printmaker, and business person, who ran an art reproductions business and a New York City art gallery. Rattner was also a long-time friend of the American writer Henry Miller, who wrote about their friendship in 1968 in A Word About Abraham Rattner. In 1942 Rattner together with Miller toured the United States. Miller wrote about it in The Airconditioned Nightmare.

== Collections ==
His artwork is in the Albright-Knox Art Gallery; Blanton Museum of Art; Buffalo, New York; Art Institute of Chicago; Baltimore Museum of Art; Detroit Institute of Arts; Montgomery Museum of Fine Arts, Montgomery, Alabama; Pennsylvania Academy of the Fine Arts, Philadelphia Museum of Art; Phillips Collection, Washington, D.C.; Wadsworth Atheneum, Hartford, Connecticut; Whitney Museum of American Art, New York City; Samuel P. Harn Museum of Art, Gainesville, Florida; and the Leepa-Rattner Museum of Art on the campus of St. Petersburg College in Tarpon Springs, Florida. He designed the stained glass east wall which dominates the interior of the Chicago Loop Synagogue (1960), described by architectural critic Brian de Breffny as "[p]erhaps the most beautiful synagogue interior in the United States."
