= Color Association of the United States =

Color trend forecasting and consulting organization

- Formerly: Textile Color Card Association of the United States (1915-1955)
- Type: Incentive Corporation Limited
- Industry: Entertainment Group
- Predecessor: Textile Color Card Association of the United States
- Founded: 1914 (as Textile Color Card Association of the United States); 1955 (as Color Association of the United States)
- Headquarters: United States
- Area served: Worldwide
- Website: www.colorassociation.com

The Color Association of the United States (CAUS), known until 1955 as the Textile Color Card Association of the United States (TCCA), is an independent color trend forecasting and color consulting service to the business community, known for its textile color swatch book, the Standard Color Reference of America (formerly the Standard Color Card of America).

== Purpose ==
As industry exploded after the Industrial Revolution certain industries especially in the textiles trade found the need to be able to better predict and set upcoming color and style trends. The Color Association of the United States (CAUS), then the Textile Color Card Association of the United States (TCCA), was formed to accomplish this goal. By implementing a standard, business could then plan upcoming product releases and marketing with better hope of success.

=== Mission ===
1. Issue color forecasts in the form of cards twice a year
2. Give directions in color trends to the market
3. Enable different segments of the market to coordinate their products by offering the formulas for the production of each forecast color
4. Buy products worldwide knowing they would coordinate at the point of sale
5. Serve as an information center for all kinds of color information.

The central purpose of setting trends and maintaining color standards is accomplished to this day in part through the publication of the "Standard Color Reference of America", and other swatch books.

== History ==
Prior to the creation of the TCCA in 1914, later to become The Color Association, hat makers took on the responsibility of color forecasting in the textile industry. Following the outbreak of World War I the information and supplies the milliners were using from Europe, especially France, was cut off. Textile manufacturers who had grown dependent of these color decisions decided to form their own committee, the TCCA, which immediately published a Standard Color Card.

Early on the TCCA set out to create what they termed "staple colors" that would facilitate the color coordination and consistency, especially among unrelated trades.

By 1930 the TCCA had built close ties to the United States government, especially in the military. The TCCA, under the managing direction of Margaret Hayden Rorke, played a major role in defining the colors and their names for all manner of government related items such as uniforms, ribbons, medals, and flags. For example, the modern Flag of the United States uses specific colors selected and named by the TCCA (Old Glory Red and Old Glory Blue).

Through the 1940s and 1950s the TCCA membership increased, including international companies. This expansion led to the creation of industry specific trends and color books sponsored by those industries and more direct consulting to individual companies.

To this day CAUS plays a major role in the determining of color trends for industry.

== Process of creating palettes ==
Many Color Cards or palettes are created for various industries each year. For each area of focus a committee panel is formed, consisting of eight to twelve people, referred in the business as the "Color Czars." Each member of the committee performs their own research on what colors they feel will, should, dominate the next few years in that industry. The committee then convenes and they debate the merits of the member selections. In the end they choose 44 colors that will make it to the palette. According to Forecaster Ken Charbonneau, the process is a lot of debate before consensus.

== Publications ==
=== The Color Compendium ===
by Augustine Hope and Margaret Walch

A fully illustrated encyclopedia focused entirely on color including scientific, technical, historical, and artistic concepts.

=== Color & Human Response ===
by Faber Birren

A hypothetical and scientific look at color and the human response.
