= Outline of Virginia =

U.S. state

The flag of Virginia

The obverse of the seal of Virginia

The location of the Commonwealth of Virginia in the United States of America

The following outline is provided as an overview of and topical guide to the U.S. state of Virginia:

Virginia (officially, the Commonwealth of Virginia) – U.S. state located in the South Atlantic region of the United States. Virginia is nicknamed the "Old Dominion" due to its status as a former dominion of the English Crown, and "Mother of Presidents" due to the most U.S. presidents having been born there. The geography and climate of the Commonwealth are shaped by the Blue Ridge Mountains and the Chesapeake Bay, which provide habitat for much of its flora and fauna. The capital of the Commonwealth is Richmond; Virginia Beach is the most populous city, and Fairfax County is the most populous political subdivision. The Commonwealth's estimated population as of 2013 is over 8.2 million.

== General reference ==
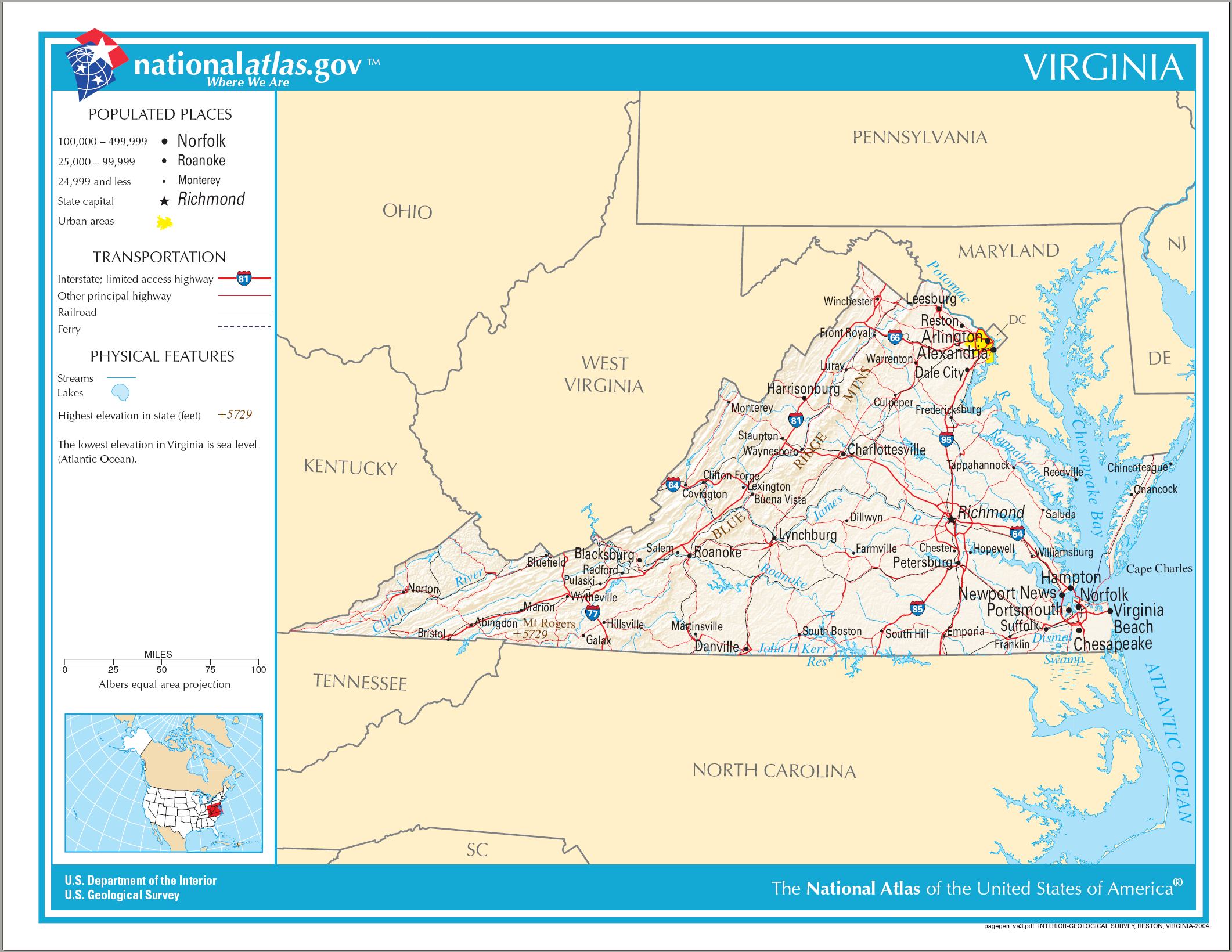
An enlargeable map of the Commonwealth of Virginia

- Names
  - Common name: Virginia
    - Pronunciation: /vərˈdʒɪniə/
  - Official name: Commonwealth of Virginia
  - Abbreviations and name codes
    - Postal symbol: VA
    - ISO 3166-2 code: US-VA
    - Internet second-level domain: .va.us
  - Nicknames
    - Mother of Presidents
    - The Old Dominion
    - The Commonwealth
- Adjectivals: Virginia, Virginian
- Demonym: Virginian

== Geography of Virginia ==
Geography of Virginia

- Virginia is: a U.S. state, a federal state of the United States of America
- Location
  - Northern Hemisphere
  - Western Hemisphere
    - Americas
      - North America
        - Anglo America
        - Northern America
          - United States of America
            - Contiguous United States
              - Eastern United States
                - East Coast of the United States
                - Mid-Atlantic states
                - Southeastern United States
              - Southern United States
- Population of Virginia: 8,001,024 (2010 U.S. Census)
- Area of Virginia: 42,774.59 sq mi (110,785.67 km^{2})
- Atlas of Virginia

=== Places in Virginia ===
- Historic places in Virginia
  - Abandoned communities in Virginia
    - Ghost towns in Virginia
  - National Historic Landmarks in Virginia
  - National Register of Historic Places listings in Virginia
    - Bridges on the National Register of Historic Places in Virginia
- National Natural Landmarks in Virginia
- National parks in Virginia
- State parks in Virginia

=== Environment of Virginia ===
Environment of Virginia

- Climate of Virginia
  - Climate change in Virginia
- Protected areas in Virginia
  - State forests of Virginia
- Superfund sites in Virginia

==== Natural geographic features of Virginia ====
- Lakes of Virginia
- Mountains of Virginia
- Gaps of Virginia
- Rivers of Virginia

=== Regions of Virginia ===
- Central Virginia
- Northern Virginia
- Southern Virginia

==== Administrative divisions of Virginia ====
An enlargeable map of the 95 counties and 38 independent cities of the Commonwealth of Virginia

- The 95 Counties and 38 Cities of the Commonwealth of Virginia
  - Municipalities in Virginia
    - Cities in Virginia
      - State capital of Virginia:
      - City nicknames in Virginia
    - Towns in Virginia
    - Unincorporated communities in Virginia

=== Demography of Virginia ===
Demographics of Virginia

== Government and politics of Virginia ==
Politics of Virginia

- Form of government: U.S. state government
- Virginia's congressional delegations
- Virginia State Capitol
- Elections in Virginia
  - Electoral reform in Virginia
- Political party strength in Virginia

=== Branches of the government of Virginia ===
Government of Virginia

==== Executive branch of the government of Virginia ====
- Governor of Virginia
  - Lieutenant Governor of Virginia
  - Secretary of State of Virginia
- State departments
  - Virginia Department of Transportation

==== Legislative branch of the government of Virginia ====
- Virginia General Assembly (bicameral)
  - Upper house: Virginia Senate
  - Lower house: Virginia House of Delegates

==== Judicial branch of the government of Virginia ====
Courts of Virginia

- Supreme Court of Virginia

=== Law and order in Virginia ===
Law of Virginia

- Cannabis in Virginia
- Capital punishment in Virginia
  - Individuals executed in Virginia
- Constitution of Virginia
- Crime in Virginia
- Gun laws in Virginia
- Law enforcement in Virginia
  - Law enforcement agencies in Virginia
    - Virginia State Police

=== Military in Virginia ===
- Virginia Air National Guard
- Virginia Army National Guard

=== Local government in Virginia ===
Local government in Virginia

== History of Virginia ==
History of Virginia

=== History of Virginia, by period ===
- Prehistory of Virginia
  - Native American tribes in Virginia
    - Powhatan
- English Colony of Virginia, 1584–1707
  - Roanoke Colony, 1585–1587
  - Jamestown, Virginia, 1607–1760
  - History of slavery in Virginia
  - Middle Plantation, Virginia, since 1632 (Williamsburg since 1698)
- French colony of Louisiane, 1699–1764
- British Colony of Virginia, 1707–1776
- French and Indian War, 1754–1763
  - Treaty of Fontainebleau of 1762
  - Treaty of Paris of 1763
- British Indian Reserve, 1763–1783
  - Royal Proclamation of 1763
  - Dunmore's War 1774
- American Revolutionary War, 1775–1783
  - United States Declaration of Independence of 1776
  - Treaty of Paris of 1783
- Commonwealth of Virginia since 1776
- Cherokee–American wars, 1776–1794
- First state to ratify the Articles of Confederation and Perpetual Union, signed July 9, 1778
- Northwestern territorial claims ceded 1784
- Tenth state to ratify the Constitution of the United States of America on June 25, 1788
- George Washington becomes the first President of the United States on April 30, 1789
- Separation of the Commonwealth of Kentucky, 1792
- Thomas Jefferson becomes the third President of the United States on March 4, 1801
- James Madison becomes the fourth President of the United States on March 4, 1809
- War of 1812, 1812–1815
- Treaty of Ghent, December 24, 1814
- James Monroe becomes the fifth President of the United States on March 4, 1817
- William Henry Harrison becomes ninth President of the United States on March 4, 1841
- John Tyler becomes the tenth President of the United States on April 4, 1841
- Mexican–American War, April 25, 1846 – February 2, 1848
- Zachary Taylor becomes 12th President of the United States on March 4, 1849
- Virginia in the American Civil War, 1861–1865
  - Confederate States of America, 1861–1865
    - Eighth state to declare secession from the United States on April 17, 1861
    - Eighth state admitted to the Confederate States of America on May 7, 1861
  - Manassas Campaign, July 2–21, 1861
    - First Battle of Bull Run, July 21, 1861
  - Battle of Hampton Roads, March 8–9, 1862
  - Valley Campaign, March 23 – June 9, 1862
  - Peninsula Campaign, March – July 1862
    - Battle of Seven Pines, May 31 – June 1, 1862
    - Seven Days Battles, June 25 – July 1, 1862
  - Northern Virginia Campaign, July 19 – September 1, 1862
    - Second Battle of Bull Run, August 29–30, 1862
  - Battle of Fredericksburg, December 11–15, 1862
  - Battle of Chancellorsville, May 1–4, 1863
  - Separation of the State of West Virginia, 1863
  - Bristoe Campaign, October 14 – November 9, 1863
  - Overland Campaign, May 5 – June 24, 1864
    - Battle of the Wilderness, May 5–7, 1864
    - Battle of Spotsylvania Court House, May 8–21, 1864
    - Battle of Cold Harbor, May 31 – June 12, 1864
  - Valley Campaigns, May 15 – October 19, 1864
  - Bermuda Hundred Campaign, May 6–20, 1864
  - Siege of Petersburg, June 9, 1864 – March 25, 1865
  - Appomattox Campaign, March 29 – April 9, 1865
    - Battle of Five Forks, April 1, 1865
    - Battle of Appomattox Court House, April 9, 1865
- Virginia in Reconstruction, 1865–1870
  - Eighth former Confederate state readmitted to the United States on January 26, 1870
- Woodrow Wilson becomes 28th President of the United States on March 4, 1913
- Shenandoah National Park established on December 26, 1935

=== History of Virginia, by subject ===
- List of Virginia state legislatures

== Culture of Virginia ==
Culture of Virginia

- Museums in Virginia
- Religion in Virginia
  - The Church of Jesus Christ of Latter-day Saints in Virginia
  - Episcopal Diocese of Virginia
- Scouting in Virginia
- State symbols of Virginia
  - Flag of the Commonwealth of Virginia
  - Great Seal of the Commonwealth of Virginia

=== The arts in Virginia ===
- Music of Virginia

=== Sports in Virginia ===
Sports in Virginia

- Professional sports teams in Virginia

== Economy and infrastructure of Virginia ==
Economy of Virginia

- Communications in Virginia
  - Newspapers in Virginia
  - Radio stations in Virginia
  - Television stations in Virginia
- Health care in Virginia
  - Hospitals in Virginia
- Transportation in Virginia
  - Airports in Virginia
  - Roads in Virginia
    - Interstate Highways in Virginia
    - State highways in Virginia

== Education in Virginia ==
Education in Virginia

- Schools in Virginia
  - School districts in Virginia
    - High schools in Virginia
  - Colleges and universities in Virginia
    - University of Virginia
    - Virginia State University

== See also ==
- Virginia
- Index of Virginia-related articles
