= Climate of Virginia =

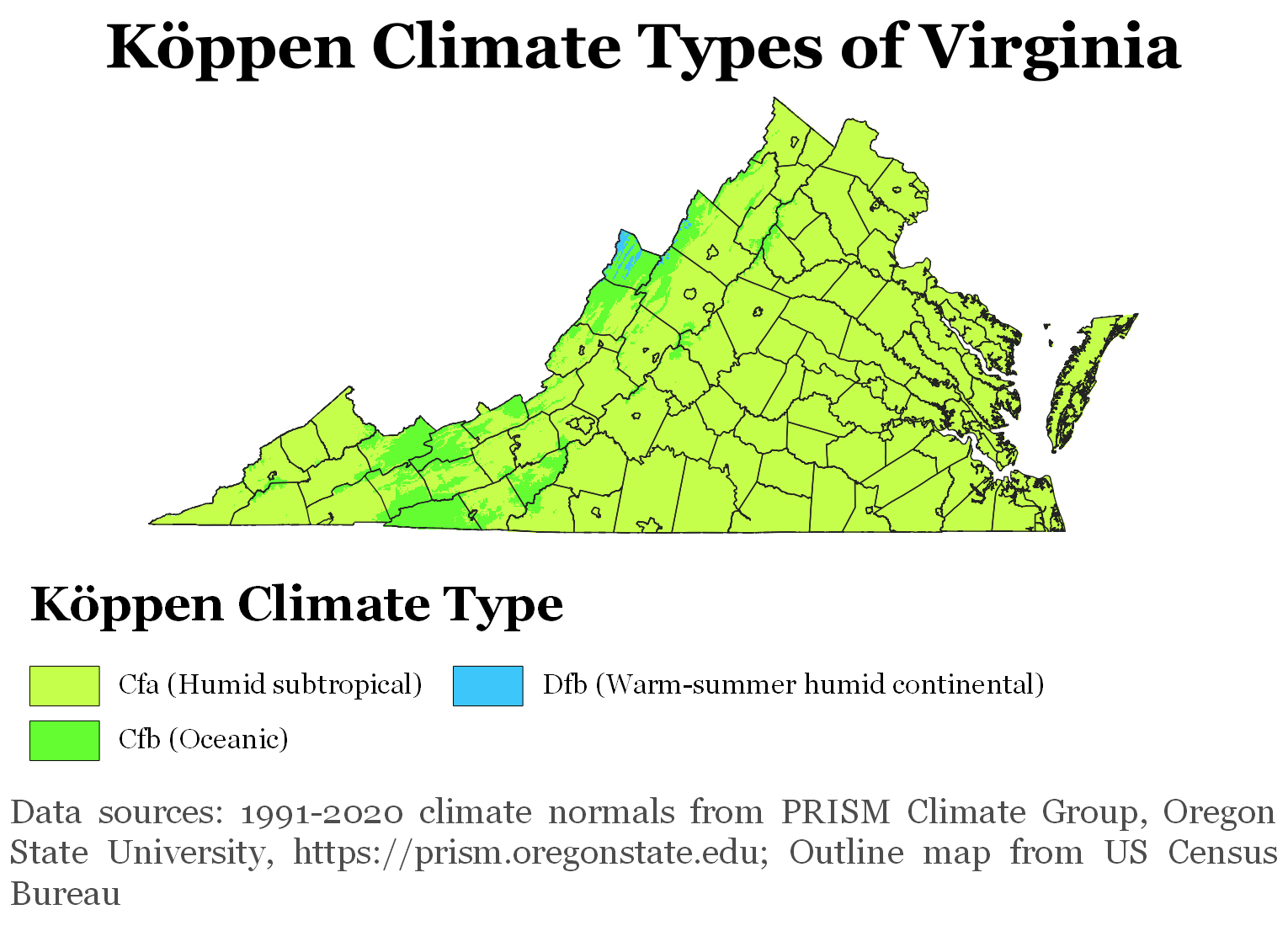
Köppen climate types of Virginia, using 1991-2020 climate normals

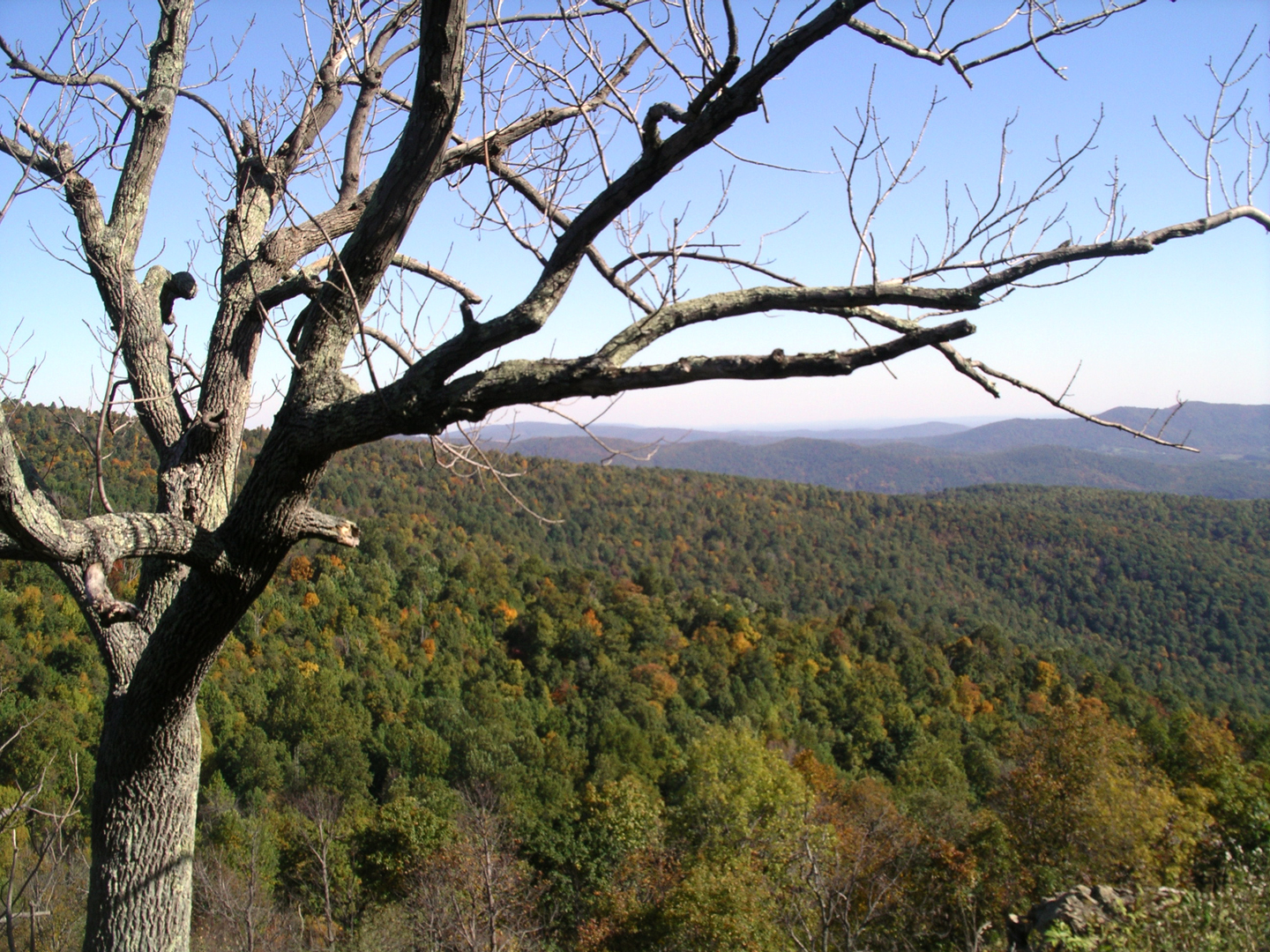
Due to the elevation, the Blue Ridge Mountains have a humid continental climate.

The climate of Virginia, a state on the east coast of the United States, is mild compared to more northern areas of the United States such as New England and the Midwest. Most of Virginia east of the Blue Ridge mountains, the southern part of the Shenandoah Valley, and the Roanoke Valley, has a humid subtropical climate (Köppen climate classification Cfa). In the mountainous areas west of the Blue Ridge, the climate is warm-summer humid continental (Köppen Dfb) or oceanic climate (Köppen Cfb). Severe weather, in the form of tornadoes, tropical cyclones, and winter storms, impacts the state on a regular basis. Central Virginia received significant snowfall of 51 centimetres (20 inches) in December 2009.

== Climate zones ==
The USDA Hardiness Zones for Virginia range from Zone 5A (-20°F to -15°F) in the mountains, to Zone 8B (15°F to 20°F) in areas of the Hampton Roads region.

A lot of variations occur because of the state's significant relief. Elevations in Virginia vary from sea level to Mount Rogers at 5,729 ft (1,746 m) above sea level, with major gradations occurring at the edges of the Atlantic Ocean, the end of the Piedmont, and the Blue Ridge and Allegheny chains of the Appalachian Mountains. The moderating influence of the ocean from the east, powered by the Gulf Stream, also creates the potential for hurricanes near the mouth of Chesapeake Bay. Cold air masses arrive over the mountains, especially in winter, which can lead to significant snowfalls when coastal storms known as noreasters move up the Atlantic coast.

The interaction of these elements with the state's topography create micro-climates in the Shenandoah Valley, the mountainous southwest, and the coastal plains that are slightly but noticeably distinct from each other.

== Statistics for selected cities ==
The highest recorded temperature is 110 °F (43 °C) at Balcony Falls on July 15, 1954, and the lowest recorded temperature is −30 °F (−34 °C) at Mountain Lake on January 22, 1985.

Climate data for Lynchburg, Virginia (Lynchburg Regional Airport), 1991–2020 normals, (Note: Mean monthly maxima and minima (i.e. the expected highest and lowest temperature readings at any point during the year or given month) calculated based on data at said location from 1991 to 2020.) extremes 1893–present (Note: Official records for Lynchburg were kept at the Weather Bureau Office from January 1893 to July 1944, and at Lynchburg Regional since August 1944. For more information, see ThreadEx)
Month	Jan	Feb	Mar	Apr	May	Jun	Jul	Aug	Sep	Oct	Nov	Dec	Year
Record high °F (°C)	80 (27)	82 (28)	92 (33)	95 (35)	100 (38)	104 (40)	106 (41)	105 (41)	102 (39)	98 (37)	85 (29)	79 (26)	106 (41)
Mean maximum °F (°C)	66.8 (19.3)	69.7 (20.9)	78.8 (26.0)	85.7 (29.8)	88.8 (31.6)	93.1 (33.9)	95.2 (35.1)	93.8 (34.3)	90.4 (32.4)	84.3 (29.1)	74.9 (23.8)	68.1 (20.1)	96.0 (35.6)
Mean daily maximum °F (°C)	46.0 (7.8)	49.6 (9.8)	58.2 (14.6)	68.8 (20.4)	75.9 (24.4)	83.2 (28.4)	86.9 (30.5)	85.2 (29.6)	78.9 (26.1)	68.9 (20.5)	58.2 (14.6)	49.0 (9.4)	67.4 (19.7)
Daily mean °F (°C)	35.9 (2.2)	38.8 (3.8)	46.4 (8.0)	56.1 (13.4)	64.2 (17.9)	72.0 (22.2)	76.0 (24.4)	74.5 (23.6)	68.0 (20.0)	57.0 (13.9)	46.5 (8.1)	38.9 (3.8)	56.2 (13.4)
Mean daily minimum °F (°C)	25.8 (−3.4)	28.0 (−2.2)	34.6 (1.4)	43.5 (6.4)	52.5 (11.4)	60.7 (15.9)	65.0 (18.3)	63.8 (17.7)	57.1 (13.9)	45.1 (7.3)	34.8 (1.6)	28.9 (−1.7)	45.0 (7.2)
Mean minimum °F (°C)	7.5 (−13.6)	12.3 (−10.9)	18.3 (−7.6)	28.7 (−1.8)	38.0 (3.3)	49.5 (9.7)	56.0 (13.3)	54.5 (12.5)	43.4 (6.3)	29.9 (−1.2)	20.9 (−6.2)	14.5 (−9.7)	5.1 (−14.9)
Record low °F (°C)	−10 (−23)	−11 (−24)	5 (−15)	20 (−7)	30 (−1)	40 (4)	49 (9)	45 (7)	35 (2)	21 (−6)	8 (−13)	−4 (−20)	−11 (−24)
Average precipitation inches (mm)	3.46 (88)	2.91 (74)	3.76 (96)	3.45 (88)	3.98 (101)	3.82 (97)	4.19 (106)	3.22 (82)	3.96 (101)	3.12 (79)	3.39 (86)	3.50 (89)	42.76 (1,086)
Average snowfall inches (cm)	3.5 (8.9)	3.6 (9.1)	2.4 (6.1)	0.1 (0.25)	0.0 (0.0)	0.0 (0.0)	0.0 (0.0)	0.0 (0.0)	0.0 (0.0)	0.0 (0.0)	0.0 (0.0)	2.0 (5.1)	11.6 (29)
Average precipitation days (≥ 0.01 in)	9.9	9.5	11.1	10.2	12.1	10.9	11.8	9.7	8.5	7.7	8.1	9.4	118.9
Average snowy days (≥ 0.1 in)	1.7	1.8	1.2	0.1	0.0	0.0	0.0	0.0	0.0	0.0	0.0	0.9	5.7
Mean monthly sunshine hours	167.0	168.2	221.7	243.7	272.3	287.5	273.4	256.6	226.5	215.4	169.6	155.9	2,657.8
Percentage possible sunshine	54	56	60	62	62	65	61	61	61	62	55	52	60
Source: NOAA (sun 1961–1990)

Climate data for Norfolk International Airport, Virginia (1991–2020 normals, (Note: Mean monthly maxima and minima (i.e. the expected highest and lowest temperature readings at any point during the year or given month) calculated based on data at said location from 1991 to 2020.) extremes 1874–present (Note: Official records for Norfolk kept January 1874 to December 1945 at the Weather Bureau Office in downtown, and at Norfolk Int'l since January 1946. For more information, see Threadex.))
Month	Jan	Feb	Mar	Apr	May	Jun	Jul	Aug	Sep	Oct	Nov	Dec	Year
Record high °F (°C)	84 (29)	82 (28)	92 (33)	97 (36)	100 (38)	102 (39)	105 (41)	105 (41)	100 (38)	95 (35)	86 (30)	82 (28)	105 (41)
Mean maximum °F (°C)	72.4 (22.4)	74.3 (23.5)	80.7 (27.1)	86.9 (30.5)	91.5 (33.1)	95.7 (35.4)	98.4 (36.9)	95.3 (35.2)	92.0 (33.3)	86.0 (30.0)	78.9 (26.1)	73.4 (23.0)	99.3 (37.4)
Mean daily maximum °F (°C)	50.7 (10.4)	53.4 (11.9)	60.1 (15.6)	70.0 (21.1)	77.4 (25.2)	85.2 (29.6)	89.4 (31.9)	86.9 (30.5)	81.4 (27.4)	72.3 (22.4)	62.1 (16.7)	54.7 (12.6)	70.3 (21.3)
Daily mean °F (°C)	42.2 (5.7)	44.2 (6.8)	50.7 (10.4)	60.1 (15.6)	68.3 (20.2)	76.7 (24.8)	81.1 (27.3)	79.2 (26.2)	74.0 (23.3)	63.7 (17.6)	53.3 (11.8)	46.1 (7.8)	61.6 (16.4)
Mean daily minimum °F (°C)	33.6 (0.9)	35.1 (1.7)	41.3 (5.2)	50.1 (10.1)	59.1 (15.1)	68.1 (20.1)	72.8 (22.7)	71.6 (22.0)	66.6 (19.2)	55.1 (12.8)	44.4 (6.9)	37.6 (3.1)	52.9 (11.6)
Mean minimum °F (°C)	18.7 (−7.4)	21.6 (−5.8)	27.4 (−2.6)	37.0 (2.8)	46.9 (8.3)	56.0 (13.3)	64.7 (18.2)	63.7 (17.6)	55.5 (13.1)	40.4 (4.7)	29.8 (−1.2)	23.9 (−4.5)	16.8 (−8.4)
Record low °F (°C)	−3 (−19)	2 (−17)	14 (−10)	23 (−5)	36 (2)	45 (7)	54 (12)	49 (9)	40 (4)	27 (−3)	17 (−8)	5 (−15)	−3 (−19)
Average precipitation inches (mm)	3.41 (87)	2.90 (74)	3.69 (94)	3.37 (86)	3.78 (96)	4.43 (113)	6.08 (154)	5.88 (149)	5.40 (137)	3.86 (98)	3.10 (79)	3.28 (83)	49.18 (1,249)
Average snowfall inches (cm)	3.2 (8.1)	1.5 (3.8)	0.4 (1.0)	0.0 (0.0)	0.0 (0.0)	0.0 (0.0)	0.0 (0.0)	0.0 (0.0)	0.0 (0.0)	0.0 (0.0)	0.0 (0.0)	1.1 (2.8)	6.2 (16)
Average precipitation days (≥ 0.01 in)	10.7	9.2	10.9	10.0	11.2	9.7	10.6	10.2	9.4	7.7	8.9	9.9	118.4
Average snowy days (≥ 0.1 in)	1.7	1.3	0.5	0.0	0.0	0.0	0.0	0.0	0.0	0.0	0.0	0.5	4.0
Average relative humidity (%)	66.3	65.6	64.6	62.8	68.8	70.6	73.3	75.2	74.4	72.1	68.5	67.0	69.1
Average dew point °F (°C)	27.9 (−2.3)	28.9 (−1.7)	35.8 (2.1)	43.2 (6.2)	54.5 (12.5)	63.1 (17.3)	68.2 (20.1)	68.0 (20.0)	62.4 (16.9)	51.3 (10.7)	41.7 (5.4)	32.7 (0.4)	48.1 (9.0)
Mean monthly sunshine hours	171.5	175.2	229.3	252.8	271.7	280.1	278.3	260.4	231.4	208.3	175.7	160.4	2,695.1
Percentage possible sunshine	56	58	62	64	62	64	62	62	62	60	57	53	61
Average ultraviolet index	2	4	5	7	8	10	9	9	7	5	3	2	6
Source 1: NOAA (relative humidity and sun 1961–1990)
Source 2: Weather Atlas (UV)

Climate data for Richmond International Airport, Virginia (1991–2020 normals, (Note: Mean monthly maxima and minima (i.e. the expected highest and lowest temperature readings at any point during the year or given month) calculated based on data at said location from 1991 to 2020.) extremes 1887–present (Note: Official records for Richmond kept January 1887 to December 1910 at downtown, Chimborazo Park from January 1911 to December 1929, and at Richmond Int'l since January 1930. For more information, see Threadex))
Month	Jan	Feb	Mar	Apr	May	Jun	Jul	Aug	Sep	Oct	Nov	Dec	Year
Record high °F (°C)	81 (27)	83 (28)	94 (34)	96 (36)	100 (38)	104 (40)	105 (41)	107 (42)	103 (39)	99 (37)	86 (30)	81 (27)	107 (42)
Mean maximum °F (°C)	70.1 (21.2)	72.6 (22.6)	80.5 (26.9)	87.7 (30.9)	91.5 (33.1)	96.6 (35.9)	98.6 (37.0)	96.7 (35.9)	92.9 (33.8)	86.4 (30.2)	77.1 (25.1)	71.7 (22.1)	99.6 (37.6)
Mean daily maximum °F (°C)	47.8 (8.8)	51.6 (10.9)	59.6 (15.3)	70.4 (21.3)	77.8 (25.4)	85.6 (29.8)	89.5 (31.9)	87.5 (30.8)	81.2 (27.3)	70.9 (21.6)	60.4 (15.8)	51.5 (10.8)	69.5 (20.8)
Daily mean °F (°C)	38.3 (3.5)	41.0 (5.0)	48.4 (9.1)	58.4 (14.7)	66.7 (19.3)	75.0 (23.9)	79.4 (26.3)	77.5 (25.3)	71.2 (21.8)	60.0 (15.6)	49.6 (9.8)	41.8 (5.4)	58.9 (14.9)
Mean daily minimum °F (°C)	28.8 (−1.8)	30.4 (−0.9)	37.2 (2.9)	46.4 (8.0)	55.7 (13.2)	64.5 (18.1)	69.2 (20.7)	67.6 (19.8)	61.1 (16.2)	49.0 (9.4)	38.8 (3.8)	32.1 (0.1)	48.4 (9.1)
Mean minimum °F (°C)	11.1 (−11.6)	16.0 (−8.9)	21.6 (−5.8)	31.9 (−0.1)	42.1 (5.6)	53.4 (11.9)	60.9 (16.1)	59.3 (15.2)	48.8 (9.3)	34.4 (1.3)	24.3 (−4.3)	18.2 (−7.7)	9.1 (−12.7)
Record low °F (°C)	−12 (−24)	−10 (−23)	10 (−12)	19 (−7)	31 (−1)	40 (4)	51 (11)	46 (8)	35 (2)	21 (−6)	10 (−12)	−2 (−19)	−12 (−24)
Average precipitation inches (mm)	3.23 (82)	2.61 (66)	4.00 (102)	3.18 (81)	4.00 (102)	4.64 (118)	4.37 (111)	4.90 (124)	4.61 (117)	3.39 (86)	3.06 (78)	3.51 (89)	45.50 (1,156)
Average snowfall inches (cm)	3.7 (9.4)	2.2 (5.6)	1.1 (2.8)	0.0 (0.0)	0.0 (0.0)	0.0 (0.0)	0.0 (0.0)	0.0 (0.0)	0.0 (0.0)	0.0 (0.0)	0.0 (0.0)	1.8 (4.6)	8.8 (22)
Average precipitation days (≥ 0.01 in)	10.0	9.0	10.8	10.5	11.1	10.6	11.4	9.4	9.3	8.1	8.4	10.0	118.6
Average snowy days (≥ 0.1 in)	1.9	1.7	1.0	0.6	0.0	0.0	0.0	0.0	0.0	0.0	0.1	0.9	5.6
Average relative humidity (%)	67.9	65.6	63.0	60.8	69.5	72.2	74.8	77.2	77.0	73.8	69.1	68.9	70.0
Average dew point °F (°C)	24.8 (−4.0)	26.4 (−3.1)	33.6 (0.9)	41.5 (5.3)	54.1 (12.3)	63.0 (17.2)	67.6 (19.8)	67.3 (19.6)	60.6 (15.9)	48.4 (9.1)	38.1 (3.4)	29.5 (−1.4)	46.2 (7.9)
Mean monthly sunshine hours	172.5	179.7	233.3	261.6	288.0	306.4	301.4	278.9	237.9	222.8	183.5	163.0	2,829
Percentage possible sunshine	56	59	63	66	65	69	67	66	64	64	60	55	64
Average ultraviolet index	2	3	5	7	8	9	9	9	7	5	3	2	6
Source 1: NOAA (relative humidity and sunshine hours 1961–1990)
Source 2: Weather Atlas

Climate data for Washington, D.C. (Reagan National Airport), 1991−2020 normals, (Note: Mean monthly maxima and minima (i.e. the expected highest and lowest temperature readings at any point during the year or given month) calculated based on data at said location from 1991 to 2020.) extremes 1872−present (Note: Official records for Washington, D.C. were kept at 24th and M Streets NW from January 1872 to June 1945, and at Reagan National Airport since July 1945.)
Month	Jan	Feb	Mar	Apr	May	Jun	Jul	Aug	Sep	Oct	Nov	Dec	Year
Record high °F (°C)	79 (26)	84 (29)	93 (34)	95 (35)	99 (37)	104 (40)	106 (41)	106 (41)	104 (40)	98 (37)	86 (30)	79 (26)	106 (41)
Mean maximum °F (°C)	66.7 (19.3)	68.1 (20.1)	77.3 (25.2)	86.4 (30.2)	91.0 (32.8)	95.7 (35.4)	98.1 (36.7)	96.5 (35.8)	91.9 (33.3)	84.5 (29.2)	74.8 (23.8)	67.1 (19.5)	99.1 (37.3)
Mean daily maximum °F (°C)	44.8 (7.1)	48.3 (9.1)	56.5 (13.6)	68.0 (20.0)	76.5 (24.7)	85.1 (29.5)	89.6 (32.0)	87.8 (31.0)	80.7 (27.1)	69.4 (20.8)	58.2 (14.6)	48.8 (9.3)	67.8 (19.9)
Daily mean °F (°C)	37.5 (3.1)	40.0 (4.4)	47.6 (8.7)	58.2 (14.6)	67.2 (19.6)	76.3 (24.6)	81.0 (27.2)	79.4 (26.3)	72.4 (22.4)	60.8 (16.0)	49.9 (9.9)	41.7 (5.4)	59.3 (15.2)
Mean daily minimum °F (°C)	30.1 (−1.1)	31.8 (−0.1)	38.6 (3.7)	48.4 (9.1)	58.0 (14.4)	67.5 (19.7)	72.4 (22.4)	71.0 (21.7)	64.1 (17.8)	52.2 (11.2)	41.6 (5.3)	34.5 (1.4)	50.9 (10.5)
Mean minimum °F (°C)	14.3 (−9.8)	16.9 (−8.4)	23.4 (−4.8)	34.9 (1.6)	45.5 (7.5)	55.7 (13.2)	63.8 (17.7)	62.1 (16.7)	51.3 (10.7)	38.7 (3.7)	28.8 (−1.8)	21.3 (−5.9)	12.3 (−10.9)
Record low °F (°C)	−14 (−26)	−15 (−26)	4 (−16)	15 (−9)	33 (1)	43 (6)	52 (11)	49 (9)	36 (2)	26 (−3)	11 (−12)	−13 (−25)	−15 (−26)
Average precipitation inches (mm)	2.86 (73)	2.62 (67)	3.50 (89)	3.21 (82)	3.94 (100)	4.20 (107)	4.33 (110)	3.25 (83)	3.93 (100)	3.66 (93)	2.91 (74)	3.41 (87)	41.82 (1,062)
Average snowfall inches (cm)	4.9 (12)	5.0 (13)	2.0 (5.1)	0.0 (0.0)	0.0 (0.0)	0.0 (0.0)	0.0 (0.0)	0.0 (0.0)	0.0 (0.0)	0.0 (0.0)	0.1 (0.25)	1.7 (4.3)	13.7 (35)
Average precipitation days (≥ 0.01 in)	9.7	9.3	11.0	10.8	11.6	10.6	10.5	8.7	8.7	8.3	8.4	10.1	117.7
Average snowy days (≥ 0.1 in)	2.8	2.7	1.1	0.0	0.0	0.0	0.0	0.0	0.0	0.0	0.1	1.3	8.0
Average relative humidity (%)	62.1	60.5	58.6	58.0	64.5	65.8	66.9	69.3	69.7	67.4	64.7	64.1	64.3
Average dew point °F (°C)	21.7 (−5.7)	23.5 (−4.7)	31.3 (−0.4)	39.7 (4.3)	52.3 (11.3)	61.5 (16.4)	66.0 (18.9)	65.8 (18.8)	59.5 (15.3)	47.5 (8.6)	37.0 (2.8)	27.1 (−2.7)	44.4 (6.9)
Mean monthly sunshine hours	144.6	151.8	204.0	228.2	260.5	283.2	280.5	263.1	225.0	203.6	150.2	133.0	2,527.7
Percentage possible sunshine	48	50	55	57	59	64	62	62	60	59	50	45	57
Average ultraviolet index	2	3	5	7	8	9	9	8	7	4	3	2	6
Source 1: NOAA (relative humidity, dew point and sun 1961−1990)
Source 2: Weather Atlas (UV)

Climate data for Dulles International Airport in Sterling, Virginia (1991−2020 normals, (Note: Mean monthly maxima and minima (i.e. the expected highest and lowest temperature readings at any point during the year or given month) calculated based on data at said location from 1991 to 2020.) extremes 1960−present)
Month	Jan	Feb	Mar	Apr	May	Jun	Jul	Aug	Sep	Oct	Nov	Dec	Year
Record high °F (°C)	79 (26)	80 (27)	89 (32)	93 (34)	97 (36)	102 (39)	105 (41)	104 (40)	100 (38)	96 (36)	84 (29)	79 (26)	105 (41)
Mean maximum °F (°C)	65.6 (18.7)	67.1 (19.5)	76.5 (24.7)	85.8 (29.9)	89.9 (32.2)	94.1 (34.5)	96.7 (35.9)	95.4 (35.2)	91.3 (32.9)	84.4 (29.1)	74.4 (23.6)	66.1 (18.9)	97.7 (36.5)
Mean daily maximum °F (°C)	42.6 (5.9)	46.1 (7.8)	54.8 (12.7)	66.8 (19.3)	75.0 (23.9)	83.1 (28.4)	87.6 (30.9)	86.3 (30.2)	79.3 (26.3)	67.8 (19.9)	56.5 (13.6)	46.5 (8.1)	66.0 (18.9)
Daily mean °F (°C)	33.9 (1.1)	36.4 (2.4)	44.2 (6.8)	55.0 (12.8)	64.0 (17.8)	72.5 (22.5)	77.2 (25.1)	75.7 (24.3)	68.6 (20.3)	56.6 (13.7)	46.0 (7.8)	37.7 (3.2)	55.7 (13.2)
Mean daily minimum °F (°C)	25.2 (−3.8)	26.7 (−2.9)	33.6 (0.9)	43.2 (6.2)	53.0 (11.7)	61.9 (16.6)	66.8 (19.3)	65.2 (18.4)	57.9 (14.4)	45.3 (7.4)	35.6 (2.0)	29.0 (−1.7)	45.3 (7.4)
Mean minimum °F (°C)	6.6 (−14.1)	9.6 (−12.4)	16.8 (−8.4)	27.8 (−2.3)	37.0 (2.8)	48.3 (9.1)	55.4 (13.0)	54.4 (12.4)	43.0 (6.1)	29.9 (−1.2)	20.6 (−6.3)	13.4 (−10.3)	3.8 (−15.7)
Record low °F (°C)	−18 (−28)	−14 (−26)	−1 (−18)	17 (−8)	28 (−2)	36 (2)	41 (5)	38 (3)	30 (−1)	15 (−9)	9 (−13)	−4 (−20)	−18 (−28)
Average precipitation inches (mm)	2.94 (75)	2.61 (66)	3.50 (89)	3.47 (88)	4.72 (120)	4.30 (109)	4.15 (105)	3.53 (90)	3.94 (100)	3.65 (93)	3.13 (80)	3.30 (84)	43.24 (1,098)
Average snowfall inches (cm)	6.9 (18)	7.0 (18)	3.9 (9.9)	0.1 (0.25)	0.0 (0.0)	0.0 (0.0)	0.0 (0.0)	0.0 (0.0)	0.0 (0.0)	0.0 (0.0)	0.3 (0.76)	2.8 (7.1)	21.0 (53)
Average extreme snow depth inches (cm)	4.3 (11)	4.3 (11)	2.5 (6.4)	0.0 (0.0)	0.0 (0.0)	0.0 (0.0)	0.0 (0.0)	0.0 (0.0)	0.0 (0.0)	0.0 (0.0)	0.1 (0.25)	1.9 (4.8)	7.5 (19)
Average precipitation days (≥ 0.01 in)	10.3	9.1	11.0	11.0	12.7	10.8	11.0	9.3	9.0	8.1	8.6	10.2	121.1
Average snowy days (≥ 0.1 in)	3.1	2.9	1.8	0.1	0.0	0.0	0.0	0.0	0.0	0.0	0.2	1.6	9.7
Average relative humidity (%)	68.1	66.0	63.9	62.6	70.4	72.3	73.0	74.8	75.4	73.0	70.0	69.6	69.9
Average dew point °F (°C)	20.7 (−6.3)	22.3 (−5.4)	30.2 (−1.0)	38.7 (3.7)	51.4 (10.8)	60.6 (15.9)	64.9 (18.3)	64.0 (17.8)	57.6 (14.2)	45.0 (7.2)	35.1 (1.7)	25.7 (−3.5)	43.0 (6.1)
Source: National Weather Service (relative humidity and dew point 1961–1990)

Climate data for Big Meadows, Virginia (station elevation 3,540ft)
Month	Jan	Feb	Mar	Apr	May	Jun	Jul	Aug	Sep	Oct	Nov	Dec	Year
Record high °F (°C)	68 (20)	66 (19)	78 (26)	87 (31)	89 (32)	88 (31)	95 (35)	92 (33)	90 (32)	84 (29)	75 (24)	68 (20)	95 (35)
Mean maximum °F (°C)	54.5 (12.5)	57.6 (14.2)	66.4 (19.1)	75.8 (24.3)	79.2 (26.2)	83 (28)	84.3 (29.1)	83.4 (28.6)	80.9 (27.2)	73.6 (23.1)	64.9 (18.3)	57.8 (14.3)	84.7 (29.3)
Mean daily maximum °F (°C)	36.1 (2.3)	38.3 (3.5)	45.9 (7.7)	56.9 (13.8)	65.5 (18.6)	72.3 (22.4)	75.4 (24.1)	74.1 (23.4)	68.1 (20.1)	58.7 (14.8)	48.0 (8.9)	38.9 (3.8)	56.5 (13.6)
Mean daily minimum °F (°C)	18.4 (−7.6)	19.7 (−6.8)	26.3 (−3.2)	35.7 (2.1)	45.5 (7.5)	53.4 (11.9)	57.2 (14.0)	55.9 (13.3)	49.8 (9.9)	39.8 (4.3)	30.4 (−0.9)	21.4 (−5.9)	37.8 (3.2)
Mean minimum °F (°C)	−2.2 (−19.0)	−0.8 (−18.2)	6.9 (−13.9)	17.8 (−7.9)	29.4 (−1.4)	39.7 (4.3)	46.2 (7.9)	44 (7)	34.2 (1.2)	23.1 (−4.9)	12.1 (−11.1)	2 (−17)	−6.4 (−21.3)
Record low °F (°C)	−29 (−34)	−14 (−26)	−6 (−21)	7 (−14)	18 (−8)	31 (−1)	34 (1)	31 (−1)	25 (−4)	12 (−11)	−1 (−18)	−15 (−26)	−29 (−34)
Average precipitation inches (mm)	3.56 (90)	3.06 (78)	4.06 (103)	4.03 (102)	4.73 (120)	4.71 (120)	4.54 (115)	4.88 (124)	5.12 (130)	4.86 (123)	4.35 (110)	3.61 (92)	51.51 (1,308)
Average snowfall inches (cm)	10.5 (27)	9.5 (24)	8.4 (21)	1.7 (4.3)	0 (0)	0 (0)	0 (0)	0 (0)	0 (0)	0.7 (1.8)	3.6 (9.1)	6.6 (17)	41.0 (104)
Average precipitation days	9	8	10	10	12	11	12	11	10	9	8	8	118
Average snowy days	7	6	4	1	0	0	0	0	0	0	3	5	28
Source: http://www.wrcc.dri.edu/cgi-bin/cliMAIN.pl?va0720

== Severe weather ==
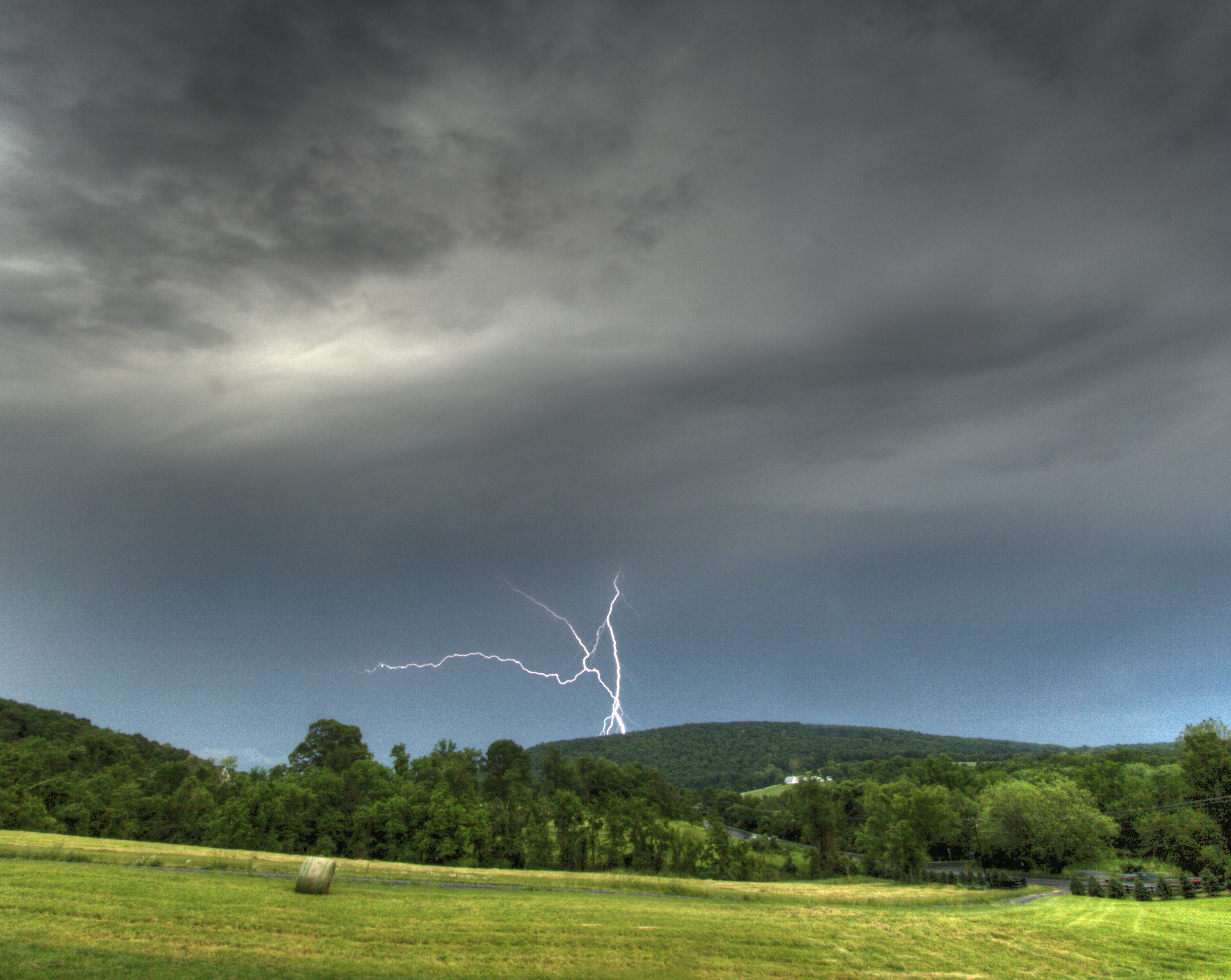
Thunderstorms are a frequent concern in Virginia.

Severe weather is a concern in Virginia. Hurricanes make the coastal area of Virginia vulnerable. Hurricane Isabel in 2003 brought much destruction from wind and rain, killing 10 directly and causing nearly two billion dollars in damage. Hurricane Gaston (2004) inundated Richmond after moving ashore South Carolina. Virginia is often struck with the remnants of systems which hit along the Gulf of Mexico coastline, which also bring torrential rain to the state. Hurricane Camille was an extreme example, bringing 27 inches (690 mm) of rainfall to portions of Nelson County in a matter of hours. Thunderstorms are an occasional concern with the state averaging anywhere from 35 to 45 days of thunderstorm activity annually.

Rainfall in Virginia is frequent, but does not normally get severe enough for floods. Virginia averages seven tornadoes annually, though most are F2 and lower on the Fujita scale. However, Virginia had eighty-five in 2004. Western Virginia has a lower rate of tornadoes.

== Climate change ==
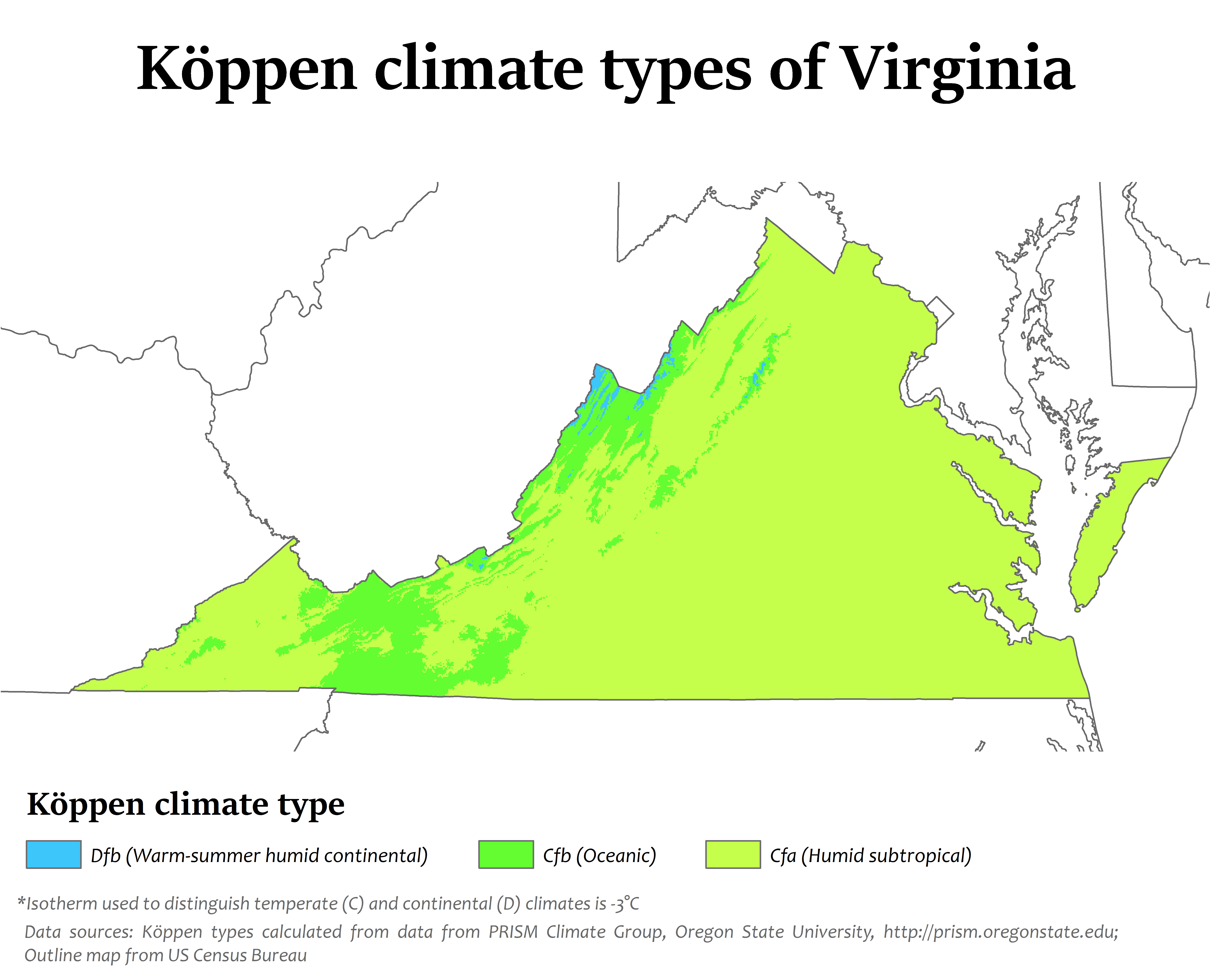
Köppen climate types in Virginia.

Climate change in Virginia encompasses the effects of climate change, attributed to man-made increases in atmospheric carbon dioxide in the U.S. state of Virginia.

The United States Environmental Protection Agency reports:

"Virginia's climate is changing. Most of the state has warmed about one degree (F) in the last century, and the sea is rising one to two inches every decade. Higher water levels are eroding beaches, submerging low lands, exacerbating coastal flooding, and increasing the salinity of estuaries and aquifers. The southeastern United States has warmed less than most of the nation. But in the coming decades, the region's changing climate is likely to reduce crop yields, harm livestock, increase the number of unpleasantly hot days, and increase the risk of heat stroke and other heat-related illnesses".

== Seasons ==
Winter in Virginia is characterized by large swings in temperature throughout and between days. This does not happen every day of the month, however. It may be 10 °C (50 °F) and windy one morning, and 21 °C (70 °F) and calm the next afternoon. Winters are cool; temperatures usually range from the 40s to the 60s Fahrenheit (4 to 15 C) in December; while in January, it typically is at or below freezing, especially in the mountains and the north, but can still be mild in the eastern and southern parts of the state, with temperatures in the 50s and 60s °F (10 to 15 °C) not uncommon. Snowfall is highly variable, occurring more heavily in some years, while in others it can be almost nonexistent. The most snow-prone region of the state is the Blue Ridge. Significant snowfall is most likely in Northern Virginia.

In the summer, temperatures are hot and humid. Precipitation is slightly greater. Temperatures are not extreme, ranging between the high 70s and mid 90s °F (25 to 35 °C); but humidity can make it feel hotter.

As for sunlight, Virginia is about average in state rankings. Areas on the Chesapeake Coast and Eastern Shore are brightest, while the west and north of the state is more cloudy. On the Winter Solstice, Virginia gets between 9 and 10 hours of sunlight. On the summer solstice, it gets between 14.5 and 15 hours.

== See also ==
- Environment of Virginia
- List of wettest known tropical cyclones in Virginia
- United States tropical cyclone rainfall climatology
