= Demographics of Virginia =

Historical population
Census	Pop.	Note	%±
1790	691,737		—
1800	807,557		16.7%
1810	877,683		8.7%
1820	938,261		6.9%
1830	1,044,054		11.3%
1840	1,025,227		−1.8%
1850	1,119,348		9.2%
1860	1,219,630		9.0%
1870	1,225,163		0.5%
1880	1,512,565		23.5%
1890	1,655,980		9.5%
1900	1,854,184		12.0%
1910	2,061,612		11.2%
1920	2,309,187		12.0%
1930	2,421,851		4.9%
1940	2,677,773		10.6%
1950	3,318,680		23.9%
1960	3,966,949		19.5%
1970	4,648,494		17.2%
1980	5,346,818		15.0%
1990	6,187,358		15.7%
2000	7,078,515		14.4%
2010	8,001,024		13.0%
2020	8,631,393		7.9%
2025 (est.)	8,880,107		2.9%
Sources: 1910–2020, 2025 Census Bureau Estimate

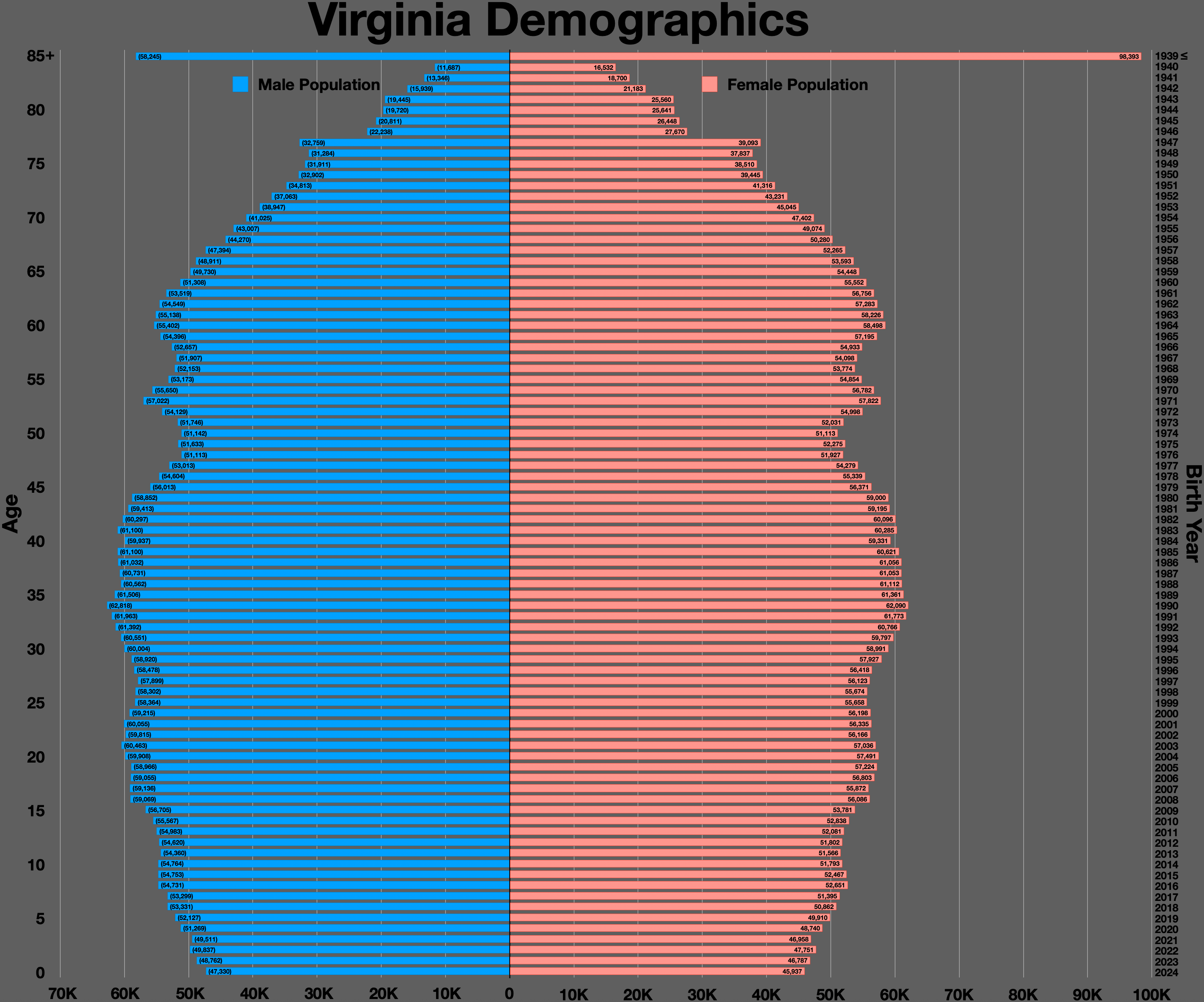
Virginia population pyramid

The demographics of Virginia are the various elements used to describe the population of the Commonwealth of Virginia and are studied by various government and non-government organizations. Virginia is the 12th-most populous state in the United States with over 8 million residents and is the 35th largest in area.

== Population of Virginia ==
As of the 2010 United States census, Virginia has a reported population of 8,001,024, which is an increase of 288,933, or 3.6%, from a previous estimate in 2007 and an increase of 922,509, or 13.0%, since the year 2000. This includes an increase from net migration of 314,832 people into the Commonwealth from 2000 to 2007. Immigration from outside the United States resulted in a net increase of 159,627 people, and migration within the country produced a net increase of 155,205 people. Also in 2009, 6.7% of Virginia's population were reported as under five years old, 23.4% under eighteen, and 12.1% were senior citizens-65+. The center of population of Virginia is located in Goochland County outside of Richmond.

Historical population

== Vital statistics ==
Year	Population	Live births	Deaths	Natural change	Crude birth rate (per 1,000)	Crude death rate (per 1,000)	Natural change (per 1,000)	Crude migration change (per 1,000)
2000	7,105,817	98,938	56,282	42,656	13.9	7.9	6.0	
2001	7,198,362	98,884	56,280	42,604	13.7	7.8	5.9	6.9
2002	7,286,873	99,672	57,196	42,476	13.7	7.8	5.9	6.3
2003	7,366,977	101,254	58,282	42,972	13.7	7.9	5.8	5.0
2004	7,475,575	103,933	56,550	47,383	13.9	7.6	6.3	8.2
2005	7,577,105	104,555	57,855	46,700	13.8	7.6	6.2	7.2
2006	7,673,725	107,817	57,690	50,127	14.1	7.5	6.6	6.1
2007	7,751,000	108,884	58,225	50,659	14.0	7.5	6.5	3.4
2008	7,833,496	106,686	59,100	47,586	13.6	7.5	6.1	4.5
2009	7,925,937	105,059	58,653	46,406	13.3	7.4	5.9	5.8
2010	8,025,105	103,002	59,032	43,970	12.8	7.4	5.4	6.9
2011	8,107,953	102,652	60,804	41,848	12.7	7.5	5.2	5.1
2012	8,197,400	103,013	61,564	41,449	12.6	7.5	5.1	5.9
2013	8,270,221	102,147	62,716	39,431	12.4	7.6	4.8	4.0
2014	8,334,206	103,300	63,598	39,702	12.4	7.6	4.8	2.9
2015	8,390,494	103,303	65,577	37,726	12.3	7.8	4.5	2.2
2016	8,445,270	102,460	66,473	35,987	12.1	7.9	4.2	2.2
2017	8,503,046	100,391	68,579	31,812	11.8	8.1	3.7	3.1
2018	8,547,370	99,843	69,359	30,484	11.7	8.1	3.6	1.6
2019	8,597,508	97,429	70,325	27,104	11.3	8.2	3.1	2.7
2020	8,637,303	94,749	80,596	14,153	11.0	9.3	1.7	3.0
2021	8,660,007	95,825	85,940	9,885	11.1	9.9	1.2	1.5
2022	8,681,038	95,630	82,935	12,695	11.0	9.6	1.4	1.0
2023	8,732,034	92,649	78,158	14,491	10.6	9.0	1.6	4.2
2024	8,819,642	94,054	77,311	16,743	10.7	8.8	1.9	8.0
2025	8,880,107	93,019	78,754	14,265	10.5	8.9	1.6	5.2

== Births data ==
Note: Births in table don't add up, because Hispanics are counted both by their ethnicity and by their race, giving a higher overall number.

Live Births by Single Race/Ethnicity of Mother
Race	2014	2015	2016	2017	2018	2019	2020	2021	2022	2023	2024
White	59,885 (58.0%)	59,244 (57.3%)	57,469 (56.1%)	55,540 (55.3%)	54,798 (54.9%)	52,997 (54.4%)	51,120 (53.9%)	52,069 (54.3%)	51,085 (53.4%)	49,171 (53.1%)	49,182 (52.3%)
Black	22,828 (22.1%)	23,029 (22.3%)	20,782 (20.3%)	21,101 (21.0%)	20,860 (20.9%)	20,339 (20.9%)	19,622 (20.7%)	19,170 (20.0%)	18,543 (19.4%)	17,607 (19.0%)	17,318 (18.4%)
Asian	8,356 (8.1%)	8,535 (8.1%)	7,909 (7.7%)	7,670 (7.6%)	7,625 (7.6%)	7,524 (7.7%)	6,945 (7.3%)	6,956 (7.2%)	7,140 (7.5%)	6,810 (7.4%)	7,123 (7.5%)
Pacific Islander	...	...	131 (0.1%)	125 (0.1%)	103 (0.1%)	127 (0.1%)	116 (0.1%)	103 (0.1%)	114 (0.1%)	115 (0.1%)	131 (0.1%)
American Indian	255 (0.2%)	254 (0.2%)	152 (0.1%)	155 (0.2%)	157 (0.2%)	144 (0.1%)	146 (0.1%)	134 (0.1%)	151 (0.2%)	111 (0.1%)	117 (0.1%)
Hispanic (any race)	13,490 (13.1%)	13,930 (13.5%)	14,230 (13.9%)	13,999 (13.9%)	14,397 (14.4%)	14,442 (14.8%)	14,806 (15.6%)	15,044 (15.7%)	15,943 (16.7%)	16,222 (17.5%)	17,296 (18.4%)
Total	103,300 (100%)	103,303 (100%)	102,460 (100%)	100,391 (100%)	99,843 (100%)	97,429 (100%)	94,749 (100%)	95,825 (100%)	95,630 (100%)	92,649 (100%)	94,054 (100%)

- Since 2016, data for births of White Hispanic origin are not collected, but included in one Hispanic group; persons of Hispanic origin may be of any race.

== Race and ethnicity ==
Racial composition	1990	2000	2010	2020 (Note: 2020 census results are not directly comparable to past results, due to changes in methodology.)
White	77.4%	72.3%	68.6%	60.3%
Black	18.8%	19.6%	19.4%	18.6%
Asian	2.6%	3.7%	5.5%	7.1%
Native	0.2%	0.3%	0.4%	0.5%
Native Hawaiian and other Pacific Islander	–	0.1%	0.1%	0.1%
Other race	0.9%	2.0%	3.2%	5.2%
Two or more races	–	2.0%	2.9%	8.2%

Virginia – Racial and ethnic composition Note: the US Census treats Hispanic/Latino as an ethnic category. This table excludes Latinos from the racial categories and assigns them to a separate category. Hispanics/Latinos may be of any race.
Race / Ethnicity (NH = Non-Hispanic)	Pop 1980	Pop 1990	Pop 2000	Pop 2010	Pop 2020	% 1980	% 1990	% 2000	% 2010	% 2020
White alone (NH)	4,179,453	4,701,650	4,965,637	5,186,450	5,058,363	78.17%	75.99%	70.15%	64.82%	58.60%
Black or African American alone (NH)	998,166	1,153,133	1,376,378	1,523,704	1,578,090	18.67%	18.64%	19.44%	19.04%	18.28%
Native American or Alaska Native alone (NH)	9,454	14,347	18,596	20,679	19,080	0.18%	0.23%	0.26%	0.26%	0.22%
Asian alone (NH)	66,102	154,183	259,277	436,298	610,612	1.24%	2.49%	3.66%	5.45%	7.07%
Native Hawaiian or Pacific Islander alone (NH)	x	x	3,380	5,061	6,195	x	x	0.05%	0.06%	0.07%
Other race alone (NH)	13,775	3,757	11,685	15,338	45,394	0.26%	0.06%	0.17%	0.19%	0.53%
Mixed race or Multiracial (NH)	x	x	114,022	181,669	404,910	x	x	1.61%	2.27%	4.69%
Hispanic or Latino (any race)	79,868	160,288	329,540	631,825	908,749	1.49%	2.59%	4.66%	7.90%	10.53%
Total	5,346,818	6,187,358	7,078,515	8,001,024	8,631,393	100.00%	100.00%	100.00%	100.00%	100.00%

=== 2025 American Community Survey one-year estimates ===
Racial Makeup of Virginia (2025): 1. White alone (58.1%); 2. Black alone (18.1%); 3. Native American alone (0.46%); 4. Asian Alone (7.69%); 5. Pacific Islander Alone (0.11%); 6. Other race alone (4.81%); 7. Two or more races (10.7%)	Racial/Ethnic Makeup of Virginia excluding Hispanics from racial categories (2025); NH=Non-Hispanic: 1. White NH (56.0%); 2. Black NH (17.9%); 3. Native American NH (0.22%); 4. Asian NH (7.63%); 5. Pacific Islander NH (0.06%); 6. Other race NH (0.56%); 7. Two or more races NH (5.68%); 8. Hispanic Any Race (11.9%)	Racial Makeup of Hispanics in Virginia (2025): 1. White alone (17.6%); 2. Black alone (2.21%); 3. Native American alone (1.98%); 4. Asian Alone (0.53%); 5. Pacific Islander Alone (0.40%); 6. Other race alone (35.6%); 7. Two or more races (41.7%)

The five largest reported ancestry groups in Virginia are: African American (19.6%), German (11.7%), American (11.4%), English (11.1%), and Irish (9.8%). Most of those claiming to be of "American" ancestry are actually of English descent, but have family that has been in the country for so long, in many cases since the early seventeenth century, that they choose to identify simply as "American". Most of Virginia's Black population are descended from enslaved Africans who worked its tobacco, cotton, and hemp plantations. Initially, these slaves came from west central Africa, primarily Angola. During the eighteenth century, however, about half of them were derived from various ethnicities located in the Niger Delta region of modern-day Nigeria. With continued immigration to Virginia of other European groups and the 19th-century sales of tens of thousands of enslaved Africans from Virginia to the Deep South, the percent of enslaved Africans fell from once being half of the total population. By 1860 slaves comprised 31% of the state's population of 1.6 million.

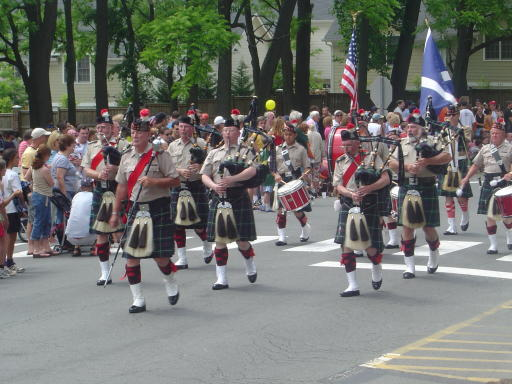
A Scottish bagpipe band marches in a Memorial Day parade in Falls Church.

In colonial Virginia the majority of free people of color were descended from marriages or relationships of white men (servants or free) and black women (slave, servant or free), reflecting the fluid relationships among working people. Many free black families were well-established and headed by landowners by the Revolution. From 1782 to 1818, a wave of slaveholders inspired by the Revolutionary ideals of equality freed slaves, until the legislature made manumissions more difficult. Some African Americans freed were those whose fathers were white masters, while others were freed for service. By 1860 there were 58,042 free people of color (black or mulatto, as classified in the census) in Virginia. Over the decades, many had gathered in the cities of Richmond and Petersburg where there were more job opportunities. Others were landowners who had working farms, or found acceptance from neighbors in the frontier areas of Virginia.

The twentieth-century Great Migration of blacks from the rural South to the urban North reduced Virginia's black population to about 20%. Today, African-Americans are concentrated in the eastern and southern Tidewater and Piedmont regions where plantation agriculture was the most dominant. The western mountains were settled primarily by people of heavily Scots-Irish ancestry. There are also sizable numbers of people of German descent in the northwestern mountains and Shenandoah Valley.

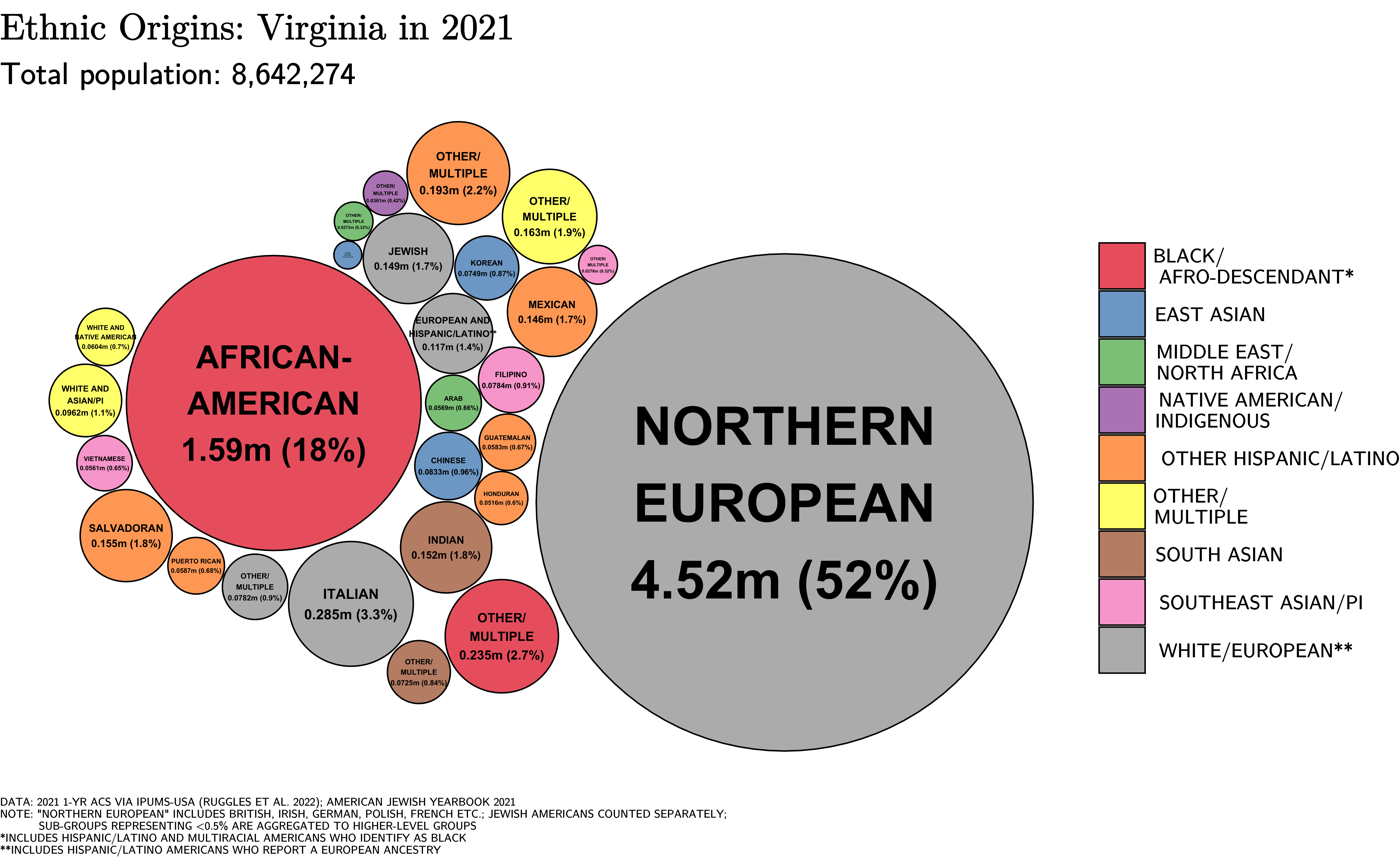
Ethnic origins in Virginia

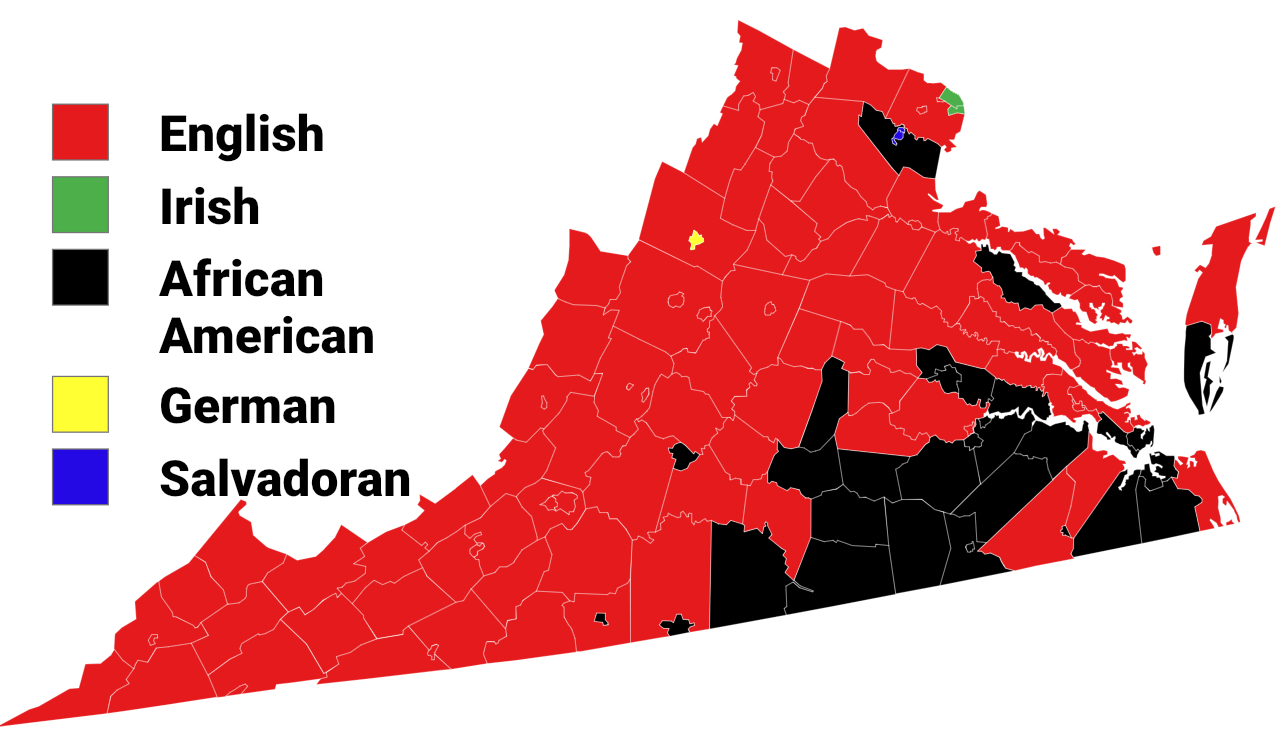
Largest alone or in any combination ethnic origin by county in Virginia, per the 2020 census

Because of recent immigration in the late 20th century and early 21st century, there are rapidly growing populations from Latin America, Asia, Africa, and the Caribbean, especially in Northern Virginia. Northern Virginia, which is a part of the DC metropolitan area, is one of the most diverse regions in the country. Virginia has one of the largest Salvadoran populations in the US, the vast majority of which is concentrated in Northern Virginia. Northern Virginia also has the largest Vietnamese population on the East Coast, with about 48,000 Vietnamese statewide as of 2007, their major wave of immigration followed the Vietnam War. The Hampton Roads area in southeastern Virginia, though it lags far behind Northern Virginia in diversity, is the second most populous in the state compared to other metro areas; aside from 'native' blacks and whites, Hampton Roads only has large populations of Filipinos, Mexicans, and Puerto Ricans. The Hampton Roads area has the highest percentage of Puerto Ricans of any metropolitan area in the Southern US outside Florida, and also has a sizable Filipino population with about 45,000 in the area, many of whom have ties to the U.S. Navy. As of 2005, 6.1% of Virginians are Hispanic and 5.2% are Asian. Virginia also continues to be home to eight Native American tribes recognized by the state, though all lack federal recognition status. Most Native American groups are located in the Tidewater region.

Romani people are present in Virginia.

== Languages ==
The Piedmont region is known for its dialect's strong influence on Southern American English. While a more homogenized American English is found in urban areas, various accents are also used, including the Tidewater accent, the Old Virginia accent, Appalachian English, and the anachronistic Elizabethan of Tangier Island.

Spanish, French, German and Korean are also spoken in the state.

Native American tribes spoke dialects of Algic, Iroquoian or Siouan.

== Religion ==
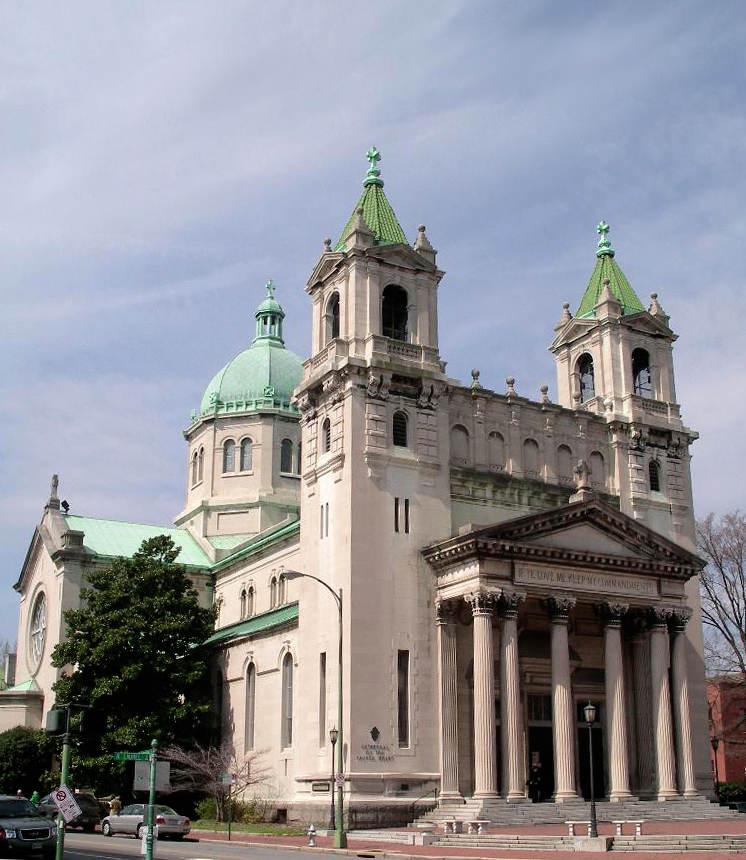
The Cathedral of the Sacred Heart is located in the Richmond's Fan district.

Religion (2008)
Christian	76%
Baptist	27%
Roman Catholic	11%
Methodist	8%
Lutheran	2%
Other Christian	28%
Judaism	1%
Islam	2.6%
Buddhism	1%
Hinduism	1%
Unaffiliated	18%

Virginia is predominantly Christian and Protestant; Baptists are the largest single group with 27% of the population as of 2008. Baptist denominational groups in Virginia include the Baptist General Association of Virginia, with about 1,400 member churches, which supports both the Southern Baptist Convention and the moderate Cooperative Baptist Fellowship; and the Southern Baptist Conservatives of Virginia with more than 500 affiliated churches, which supports the Southern Baptist Convention.

Roman Catholics are the second-largest religious group, and the group which grew the most in the 1990s. The Roman Catholic Diocese of Arlington includes most of Northern Virginia's Catholic churches, while the Diocese of Richmond covers the rest. The Virginia Conference is the regional body of the United Methodist Church. The Virginia Synod is responsible for the congregations of the Lutheran Church. The Episcopal Diocese of Virginia, Southern Virginia, and Southwestern Virginia support the various Episcopal churches. In November 2006, 15 conservative Episcopal churches voted to split from the Diocese of Virginia over its ordination of openly gay bishops and clergy; these churches continue to claim affiliation with the larger Anglican Communion through other bodies outside the United States. Though Virginia law allows parishioners to determine their church's affiliation, the diocese claims the secessionist churches' properties. The resulting property law case is a test for Episcopal churches nationwide.

Presbyterians, Pentecostals, Congregationalists, and Episcopalians each composed 1–3% of the population as of 2001. Among other religions, adherents of the Church of Jesus Christ of Latter-day Saints constitute 1.1% of the population, with 204 congregations in Virginia as of 2020, making Virginia the state with the highest percentage of Mormons east of the Mississippi. Fairfax Station is home to the Ekoji Buddhist Temple, of the Jodo Shinshu school, the Sikh Foundation of Virginia a Sikh Gurdwara, and the Hindu Durga Temple. Chesapeake, Virginia is home to the Guru Nanak Foundation of Tidewater Sikh Gurdwara. While a small population in terms of the state overall, organized Jewish sites date to 1789 with Congregation Beth Ahabah. Muslims are a rapidly growing religious group throughout the state through immigration. Megachurches in the state include Thomas Road Baptist Church, Immanuel Bible Church, and McLean Bible Church.

== Gallery ==
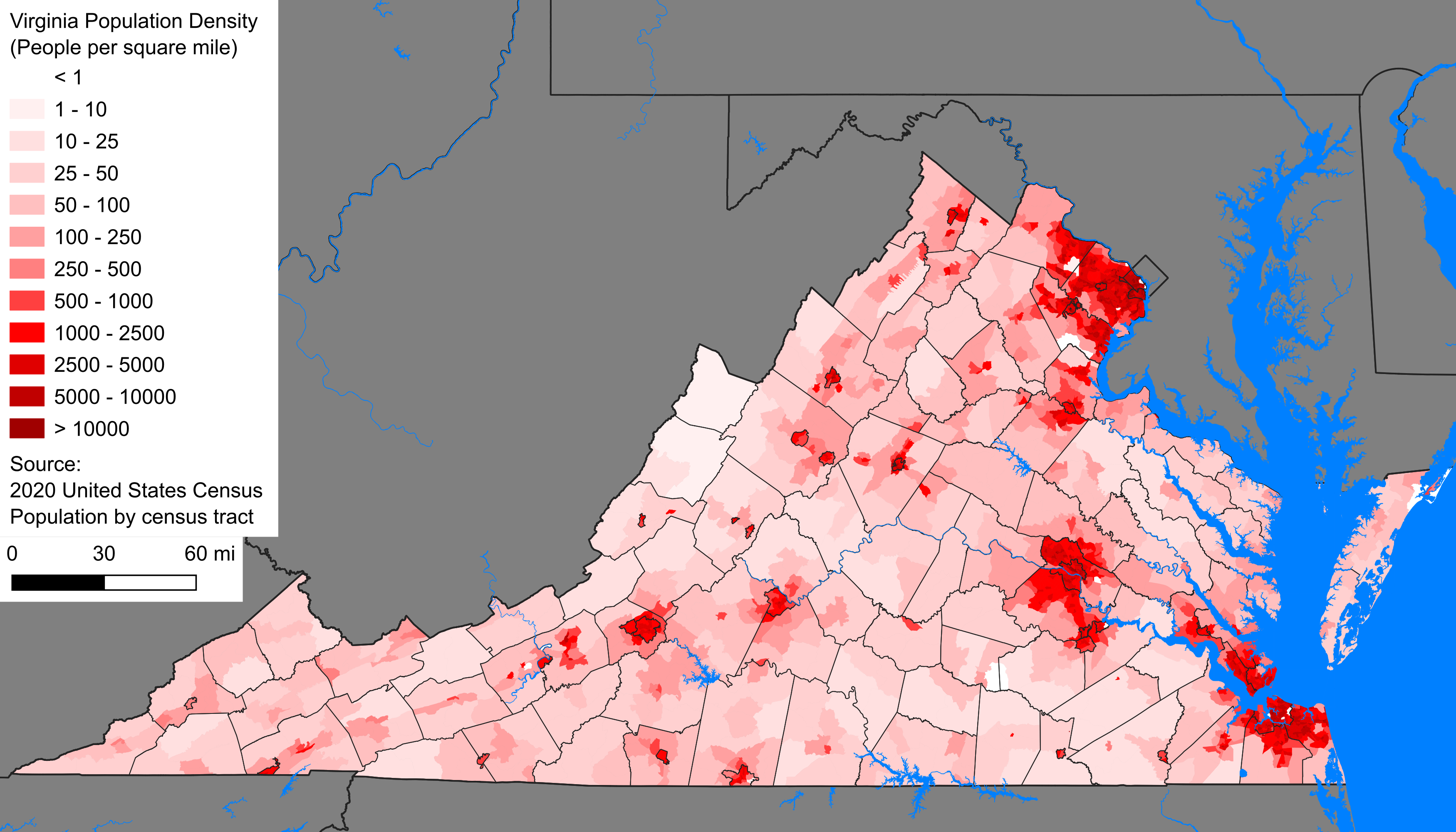
Population density of Virginia by census tract in 2020.

Virginia counties and cities by population density (population/ square mile) in 2015.

Virginia counties and cities by population in 2010.

Virginia counties and cities by population change from 2000 to 2010, in percentage.

Top 10 most populated cities in Virginia (2010).

== See also ==
- Virginia census statistical areas
- Native American tribes in Virginia
