= Immanuel Bible Church =

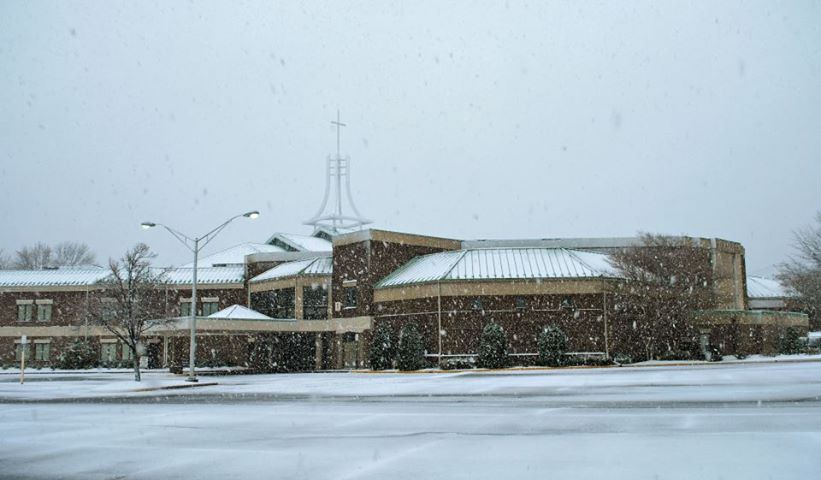
- Immanuel Bible Church
- Immanuel Bible Church
- Location: 6911 Braddock Rd., Springfield, VA 22151
- Country: United States
- Denomination: Non-denominational
- Website: immanuelbible.church

History
- Founded: 1964

Immanuel Bible Church is a non-denominational church located in Springfield, Virginia, United States.

== History ==
The church was founded in 1964 as a Baptist church (part of the General Association of Regular Baptists). The groundbreaking for the church's building took place in 1966. In 1984 the church became non-denominational.

== Immanuel Christian School ==
The school has been criticized for their anti-LGBT policies, which ban LGBTQ students and employees. This followed the decision of Karen Pence, second lady, to return as an art teacher in early 2019. The attention the school received as a result of this caused a media debate as to whether their policies are discriminatory.
