= Environment of Virginia =

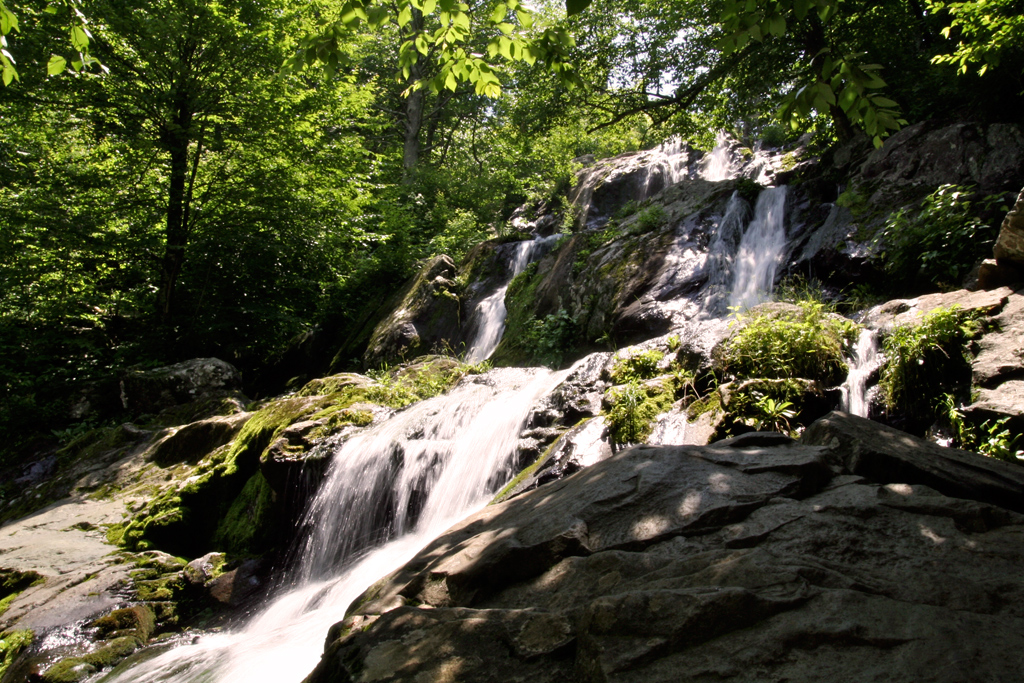
Dark Hollow Falls in Shenandoah National Park

The natural environment of Virginia encompasses the physical geography and biology of the U.S. state of Virginia. Virginia has a total area of 42,774.2 square miles (110,784.67 km^{2}), including 3,180.13 square miles (8,236.5 km^{2}) of water, making it the 35th-largest state by area. Forests cover 65% of the state, wetlands and water cover 6% of the land in the state, while 5% of the state is a mixture of commercial, residential, and transitional.

Virginia is bordered by Maryland and Washington, D.C. to the north and east; by the Atlantic Ocean to the east; by North Carolina and Tennessee to the south; by Kentucky to the west; and by West Virginia to the north and west. Due to a peculiarity of Virginia's original charter, its boundary with Maryland and Washington, D.C. does not extend past the low-water mark of the south shore of the Potomac River (unlike many boundaries that split a river down the middle). The southern border is defined as the 36° 30′ parallel north, though surveyor error led to deviations of as much as three arcminutes.

The state agencies whose primary foci are on the natural environment of Virginia are the Department of Conservation and Recreation (DCR), and the Department of Environmental Quality (DEQ).

== Physiogeographic regions and geology ==
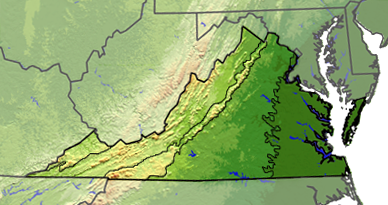
Virginia is divided into five geographic regions.

Geologically, Virginia is divided into five regions, while the EPA lists seven ecoregions with further precision. From east to west, the regions are as follows:

- The Tidewater is a coastal plain between the Atlantic coast and the Fall Line. It includes the Eastern Shore and major estuaries which enter the Chesapeake Bay. This region corresponds to the EPA's Middle Atlantic Coastal Plain (#63) and Southeastern Plains (#65) regions.

The Chesapeake Bay separates the contiguous portion of the Commonwealth from the two-county peninsula of Virginia's Eastern Shore. The bay was formed following a meteoroid impact crater during the Eocene. Many of Virginia's rivers flow into the Chesapeake Bay, including the Potomac, Rappahannock, James, and York, which create three peninsulas in the bay.

- The Piedmont is a series of sedimentary and igneous rock-based foothills east of the mountains which were formed in the Mesozoic. The region, known for its heavy clay soil, includes the Southwest Mountains. This region corresponds to the EPA's Piedmont (#45) and Northern Piedmont (#64) regions.
- The Blue Ridge Mountains are a physiographic province of the chain of Appalachian Mountains with the highest points in the state, the tallest being Mount Rogers at 5,729 feet (1,746 m). This corresponds to the EPA's Blue Ridge (#66) region.

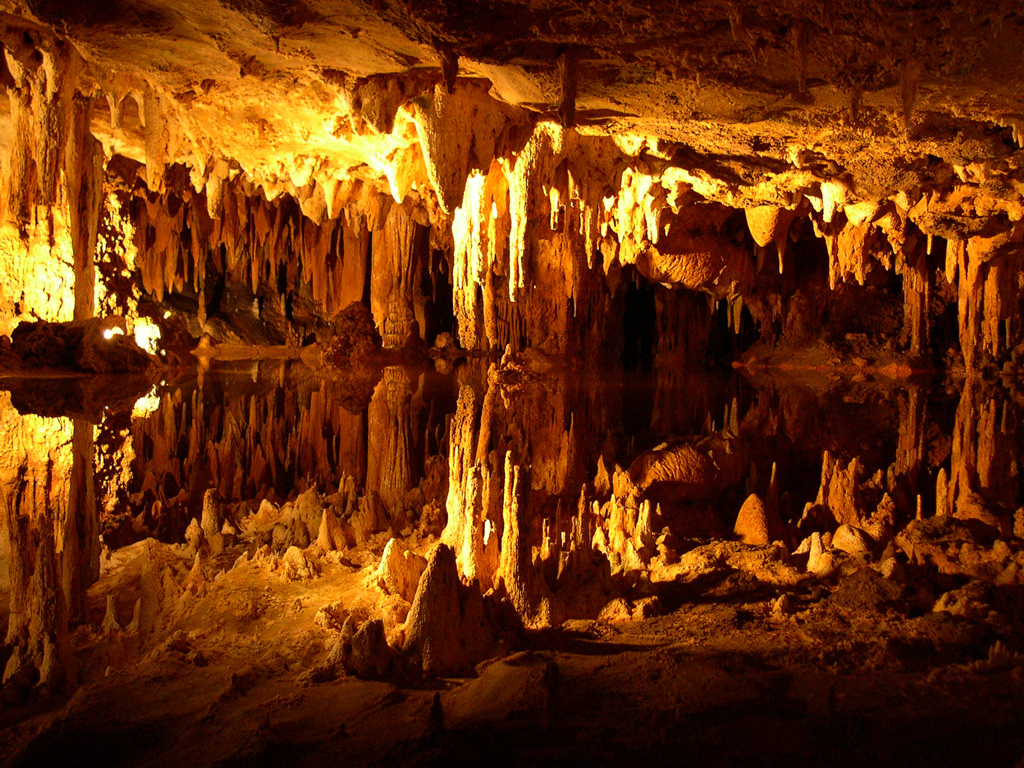
Reflecting Lake in Luray Caverns in the northern Shenendoah valley

- The Ridge and Valley region is west of the mountains, and includes the Great Appalachian Valley, which includes the Shenandoah Valley. This region corresponds to the EPA's Ridge and Valley (#67) region. The region is carbonate rock based (primarily limestone), and includes Massanutten Mountain. Because of the areas of carbonate rock and resulting karst formations, more than 4,000 caves exist in Virginia, with ten open for tourism. Likewise, another feature that resulted from limestone erosion in the valley region is the Natural Bridge.
- The Cumberland Plateau (also called the Appalachian Plateau) and the Cumberland Mountains are in the south-west corner of Virginia, below the Allegheny Plateau. In this region rivers flow northwest, with a dendritic drainage system, into the Ohio River basin. This region corresponds to the EPA's Central Appalachians (#69) region.

Coal mining takes place in the three mountainous regions at 40 distinct coal beds near Mesozoic basins. Besides coal, resources such as slate, kyanite, sand, and gravel are mined, with an annual value of almost $2 billion as of 2025.

Virginia has a low risk of earthquakes, especially in the northern part of the state. The Virginia seismic zone has not had a history of regular earthquake activity. Earthquakes are rarely above 4.5 in magnitude because Virginia is located centrally on the North American Plate, far from plate boundaries. Locations near tectonic plates suffer earthquakes frequently. The 1897 Giles County earthquake, at an estimated 5.9 magnitude, near Blacksburg, was the largest in Virginia. The largest since then was in August 2011, when a 5.8 magnitude quake struck near Mineral, Virginia and was felt moderately to strongly throughout the state.

== Climate ==
Virginia map of Köppen climate classification

The climate of Virginia varies according to location, and becomes increasingly warmer and humid farther south and east. Most of the state has a humid subtropical climate, from the Blue Ridge Mountains and southern Shenandoah Valley to the Atlantic coast. In the Blue Ridge Mountains, the climate becomes subtropical highland.

== Ecology ==
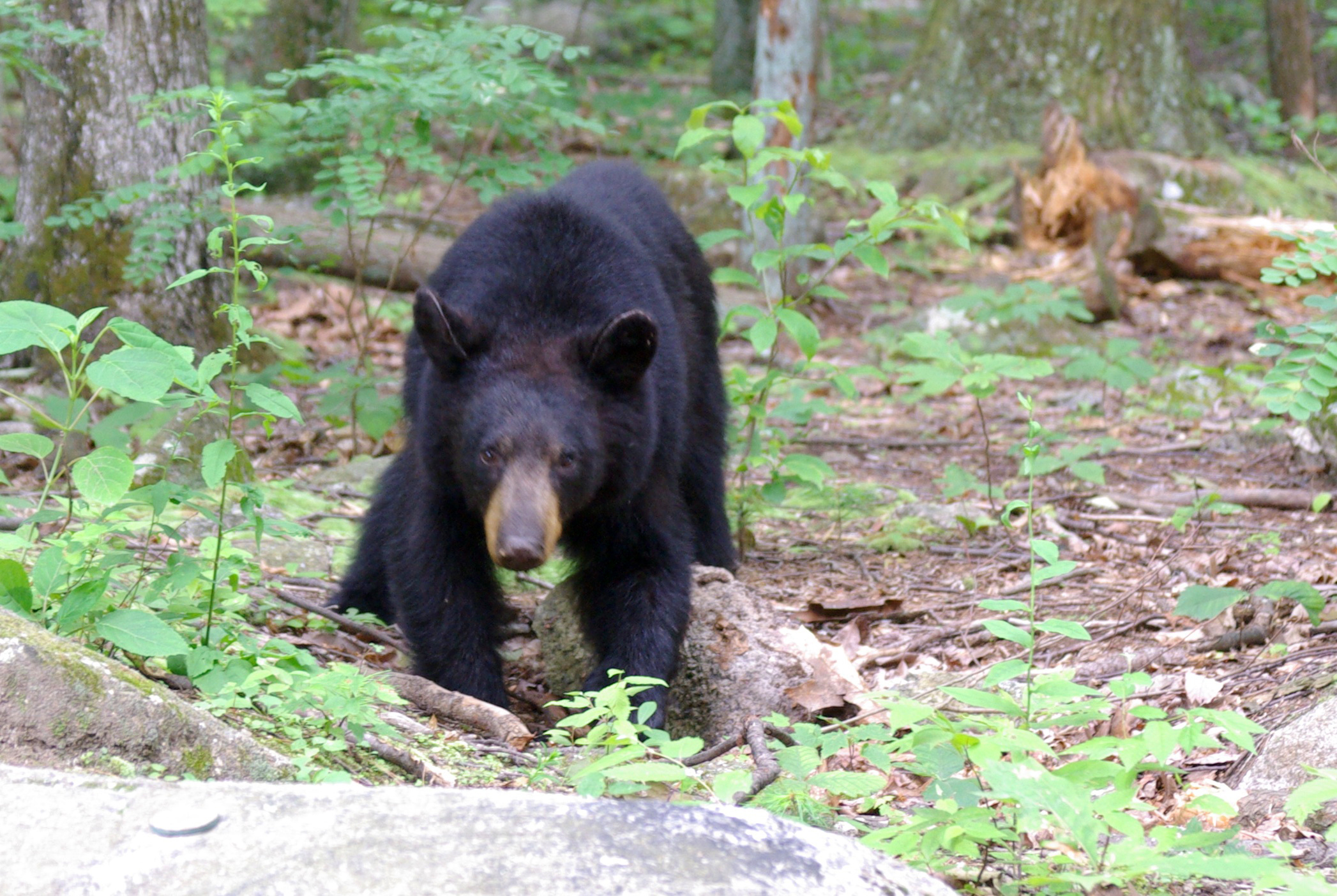
Black bear on Old Rag Mountain

The World Wildlife Fund defines four ecoregions in Virginia: Middle Atlantic coastal forests near the Atlantic coast in the southeast corner of the state, Southeastern mixed forests on the Piedmont, Appalachian-Blue Ridge forests on the Appalachian Mountains, and Appalachian mixed mesophytic forests in the far west.

According to the Virginia Department of Environmental Quality, the oak-hickory forest is the most common forest community in Virginia. Common species include white oak, red oak, black oak, scarlet oak, chestnut oak, mockernut hickory, pignut hickory, tulip poplar, maple, beech, dogwood, black cherry, black locust, and black walnut. The oak-pine forest is the second largest type of forest with the afore mentioned oaks and the addition of loblolly pine, shortleaf pine, Virginia pine, black gum, sweetgum, hickories, sycamore, red cedar, and tulip poplar. This type of forest is found primarily on the coastal plain and piedmont. Lowland hardwoods include willow oak, water oak, blackgum, sweetgum, cottonwood, willow, ash, elm, hackberry, and red maple.

The lower altitudes are more likely to have small but dense stands of moisture-loving hemlocks and mosses in abundance, with hickory and oak in the Blue Ridge. However, since the early 1990s, Gypsy moth infestations have eroded the dominance of oak forests. Other common trees and plants include chestnut, maple, tulip poplar, mountain laurel, milkweed, daisies, and many species of ferns. The largest areas of wilderness are along the Atlantic coast and in the western mountains, which are likely home to the largest populations of trillium wildflowers in North America.

Mammals include white-tailed deer, black bear, beaver, bobcat, coyote, raccoon, groundhog, Virginia opossum, gray fox, red fox, river otter, snowshoe hare, southern bog lemming, common eastern chipmunk, common mink, common muskrat, cotton mouse, eastern spotted skunk, striped skunk, fox squirrel, gray squirrel, northern flying squirrel, marsh rabbit, and eastern cottontail rabbit. Birds include cardinals, barred owls, Carolina chickadees, American crow, American goldfinch, American pipit, American robin, Baird's sandpiper, Baltimore oriole, barn owl, great blue heron, great horned owl, snow goose, herring gull, mallard, blue jay, swallow-tailed kite, American tree sparrow, American white pelican, brown pelican, bald-eagle, cattle egret, common loon, eastern bluebird, osprey, arctic peregrine falcon, red-tailed hawk, and wild turkeys. The peregrine falcon was reintroduced into Shenandoah National Park in the mid-1990s.

Walleye, brook trout, Roanoke bass, and blue catfish are among the 210 known species of freshwater fish. Running brooks with rocky bottoms are often inhabited by a plentiful amounts of crayfish and salamanders. The Chesapeake Bay is the nation's largest and most biologically diverse estuary and is home to many species, including blue crab, clams, oysters, scallops, Chesapeake ray, eel, bay anchovies, American shad, Atlantic croaker, Atlantic sturgeon, black drum, black seabass, blue fish, hickory shad, longnose gar, red drum, spot, and rockfish (also known as striped bass).

== Protected lands ==
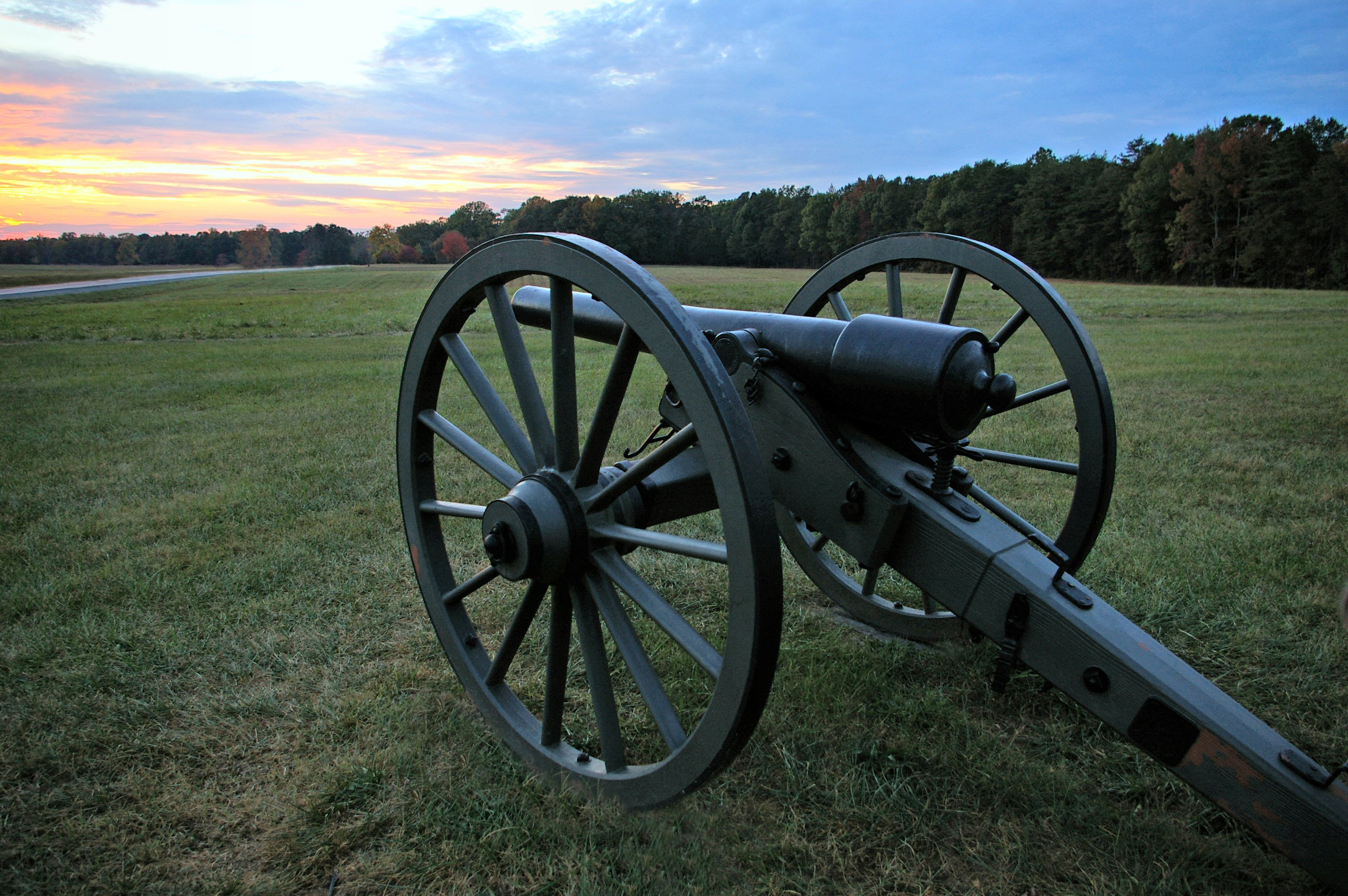
Cannon at the Fredericksburg and Spotsylvania National Military Park

Virginia has 30 National Park Service units, such as Great Falls Park and the Appalachian Trail, and one national park, the Shenandoah National Park. Shenandoah was established in 1935. Almost 40% of the park's area (79,579 acres/322 km^{2}) has been designated as wilderness under the National Wilderness Preservation System. Parkways, such as the George Washington Memorial Parkway and the Blue Ridge Parkway, which encompasses the scenic Skyline Drive, are among the most visited national park service sites nationwide.

Additionally, there are 34 Virginia state parks and 17 state forests, run by the Department of Conservation and Recreation and the Department of Forestry. The Chesapeake Bay, while not a national park, is protected by both state and federal legislation, and the jointly run Chesapeake Bay Program which conducts restoration on the bay and its watershed. The Great Dismal Swamp National Wildlife Refuge extends into North Carolina. Several open-air museums and battlefields are located in the state, such as Colonial Williamsburg, Richmond National Battlefield, and Fredericksburg and Spotsylvania National Military Park.

As of March 26, 2010, there were 31 Superfund sites in Virginia on the National Priorities List, as designated under the Comprehensive Environmental Response, Compensation, and Liability Act (CERCLA) environmental law. No additional sites are currently proposed for entry on the list. Four sites have been cleaned up and removed from the list.

== Bibliography ==
- Burnham, Bill; Burnham, Mary (2004). Hiking Virginia: A Guide to Virginia's Greatest Hiking Adventures. Guilford, CT: Globe Pequot. ISBN 0-7627-2747-0.
- Carroll, Steven; Miller, Mark (2002). Wild Virginia: A Guide to Thirty Roadless Recreation Areas Including Shenandoah National Park. Guilford, CT: Globe Pequot. ISBN 0-7627-2315-7.
- The Encyclopedia of Virginia. Vol. 1 (4 ed.). St. Clair Shores, MI: Somerset Publishers. 1999. ISBN 0-403-09753-3.
- Howard, Blair; Burnham, Mary; Burnham, Bill (2006). The Virginia Handbook (3 ed.). Edison, NJ: Hunter Publishing. ISBN 1-58843-512-1.
- Hubbard, Bill Jr. (2009). American Boundaries: The Nation, the States, the Rectangular Survey. Chicago: University of Chicago Press. ISBN 978-0-226-35591-7.
- Palmer, Tim (1998). America by Rivers. Washington, D.C.: Island Press. ISBN 1-55963-264-X.
- Pazzaglia, Frank James (2006). Excursions in Geology and History: Field Trips in the Middle Atlantic States. Boulder, CO: Geological Society of America. ISBN 0-8137-0008-6.
- Smith, Julian (2008). Moon Virginia: Including Washington, D.C. (4 ed.). Berkeley, CA: Avalon Travel. ISBN 978-1-59880-011-1.
