= Sports teams in Virginia =

Sports teams in Virginia include several professional teams, but no professional major-league teams. Virginia is the most populous U.S. state without a major professional sports league franchise playing within its borders, although two of the major-league teams representing Washington, D.C.—the NFL's Washington Commanders and NHL's Washington Capitals—have their practice facilities and operational headquarters in Northern Virginia.

== Major league teams ==
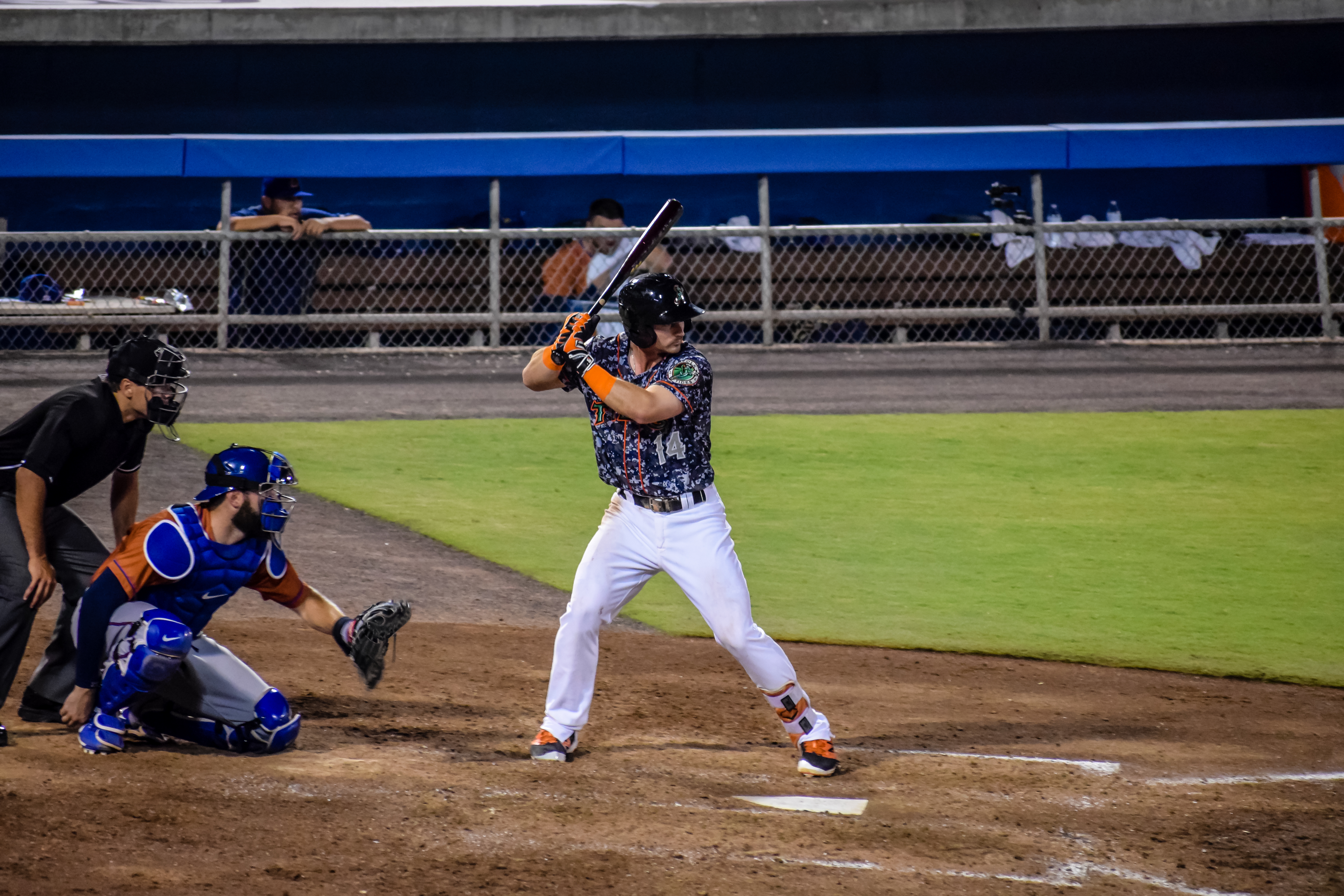
The Norfolk Tides play at Harbor Park in Norfolk.

There have been proposals to locate stadiums for Washington, D.C.–based teams in Northern Virginia or to locate teams in the Hampton Roads metro area surrounding Norfolk, but none have come to fruition. When Jack Kent Cooke decided to build a replacement for the aging RFK Stadium as home of the Washington Football team, he considered a site in Alexandria until public opposition developed. An attempt to bring a National Hockey League expansion franchise to Norfolk in the late 1990s was rejected by the NHL, with the expansion franchise instead becoming the Columbus Blue Jackets. However, the Washington Wizards played a preseason game at a high school in Alexandria, Virginia against the New York Knicks in 1978.

The Houston Astros were nearly sold and relocated to Northern Virginia in 1996, but Major League Baseball owners stepped in and scuttled the proposed transaction in order to give Houston time to approve a new stadium deal. A proposal to relocate the Montreal Expos to Norfolk was considered by Major League Baseball in 2004. MLB had also considered a site near Washington Dulles International Airport in Loudoun County as a possible new home for the Expos. However, a reluctance by state officials to dedicate funds to the project along with concern about traffic helped lead MLB to select Washington as the Expos' new home. The ownership of the Florida Marlins had mentioned Norfolk as one of the cities to which it could relocate the team, but the Marlins will now remain in South Florida for the foreseeable future since they moved to a new park in Miami in 2012, adopting their current name of Miami Marlins at that time.

The Virginia Squires played in the American Basketball Association from 1970 to 1976; the team was left out of that league's partial merger with the NBA after the 1975 and 1976 season.

== Other teams ==
The Virginia Destroyers played in the United Football League in 2011, and began playing in the 2012 season, however the Destroyers folded, along with the rest of the UFL.

Starting in 2021, Old Glory DC of Major League Rugby began playing at Segra Field near Leesburg, Virginia.

=== Other current teams ===
| Club | Sport | League |
|---|---|---|
| Fredericksburg Nationals | Baseball | Carolina League |
| Hill City Howlers | Baseball | Carolina League |
| Norfolk Tides | Baseball | International League |
| Richmond Flying Squirrels | Baseball | Eastern League |
| Salem RidgeYaks | Baseball | Carolina League |
| Virginia Valley Vipers | Basketball | 94x50 League |
| Hampton Hammerheads | Box lacrosse | Professional Box Lacrosse Association |
| Virginia Rampage | Dodgeball | National Dodgeball League |
| Blue Ridge Bobcats | Ice hockey | Federal Prospects Hockey League |
| Norfolk Admirals | Ice hockey | ECHL |
| Roanoke Rail Yard Dawgs | Ice hockey | SPHL |
| Charlottesville Alliance FC | Soccer | National Premier Soccer League |
| Hampton Roads Piranhas | Soccer | USL League Two |
| Lionsbridge FC | Soccer | USL League Two |
| Loudoun United FC | Soccer | USL Championship |
| Northern Virginia FC | Soccer | USL League Two |
| Northern Virginia United FC | Soccer | National Premier Soccer League |
| Richmond Kickers | Soccer | USL League One |
| Virginia Beach City FC | Soccer | National Premier Soccer League |
| Virginia Beach United FC | Soccer | USL League Two |
| Virginia Dream FC | Soccer | National Premier Soccer League |
