= List of Superfund sites in Virginia =

This is a list of Superfund sites in Virginia designated under the Comprehensive Environmental Response, Compensation, and Liability Act (CERCLA) environmental law. The CERCLA federal law of 1980 authorized the United States Environmental Protection Agency (EPA) to create a list of polluted locations requiring a long-term response to clean up hazardous material contaminations. These locations are known as Superfund sites, and are placed on the National Priorities List (NPL).

The NPL guides the EPA in "determining which sites warrant further investigation" for environmental remediation. As of December, 2022, there were 29 Superfund sites on the National Priorities List in Virginia. No additional sites have been proposed for the list as of 2023. Six sites have been cleaned up and removed from the list.

== Superfund sites ==
Deleted from National Priorities List

CERCLIS ID	Name	County/City	Reason	Proposed	Listed	Construction completed	Partially deleted	Deleted
VAD980551683	Abex Corp.	City of Portsmouth		06/24/1988	08/30/1990	–	–	–
VAD042916361	Arrowhead Associates/Scovill Corp.	Westmoreland Co.		06/24/1988	02/21/1990	09/27/2002	–	–
VAD990710410	Atlantic Wood Industries, Inc.	City of Portsmouth		06/10/1986	02/21/1990	–	–	–
VAD070358684	Avtex Fibers, Inc.	Warren Co.		10/15/1984	06/10/1986	–	–	–
VAD089027973	Buckingham County Landfill	Buckingham Co.		04/10/1985	10/04/1989	09/21/1998	–	–
VAD049957913	C & R Battery Co., Inc.	Chesterfield Co.		01/22/1987	07/22/1987	09/28/1993	–	–
VAD980712913	Chisman Creek	York Co.		12/30/1982	09/08/1983	12/21/1990	–	–
VAD059165282	Culpeper Wood Preservers, Inc.	Culpeper Co.		10/15/1984	10/04/1989	–	–	–
VA3971520751	Defense General Supply Center (DLA)	Chesterfield Co.		10/15/1984	07/22/1987	–	–	–
VAD980552095	Dixie Caverns County Landfill	Roanoke Co.		01/22/1987	10/04/1989	09/25/1997	–	09/28/2001
VAD980554984	First Piedmont Rock Quarry (Route 719)	Pittsylvania Co.						
VAD123933426	Former Nansemond Ordnance Depot	City of Suffolk						
VA6210020321	Fort Eustis (USARMY)	City of Newport News						
VAD003125374	Greenwood Chemical Co.	Albemarle Co.		01/22/1987	7/22/1987	09/30/2005	–	–
VAD980539878	H & H Inc., Burn Pit	Hanover Co.						
VAD980829030	Hidden Lane Landfill	Loudoun Co.						
VAD077923449	Kim-Stan Landfill	Alleghany Co.		04/23/1999	07/22/1999	08/03/2009	–	–
VAD007972482	L.A. Clarke & Son	Spotsylvania Co.						
VA2800005033	Langley Air Force Base/NASA Langley Research Center	City of Hampton		05/10/1993	05/31/1994	–	–	–
VA1170024722	Marine Corps Combat Development Command	Prince William Co.						
VAD980712970	Matthews Electroplating	Roanoke Co.		12/30/1982	09/08/1983	03/29/1988	–	01/19/1989
VA5170022482	Naval Amphibious Base Little Creek	City of Virginia Beach						
VA7170024684	Naval Surface Warfare Center Dahlgren Division	King George Co.		02/07/1992	10/14/1992	–	–	–
VA8170024170	Naval Weapons Station Yorktown	York Co.		02/07/1992	10/14/1992	–	–	–
VA6170061463	Norfolk Naval Base (Sewells Point Naval Complex)	City of Norfolk						
VA1170024813	Norfolk Naval Shipyard	City of Portsmouth						
VA3170024605	NWS Yorktown - Cheatham Annex	York Co.						
VAN000306115	Peck Iron and Metal	City of Portsmouth		04/09/2009	11/04/2009	–	–	–
VAD071040752	Rentokil, Inc. (Virginia Wood Preserving Division)	Henrico Co.		01/22/1987	03/31/1989	09/02/1999	–	–
VAD980831796	Rhinehart Tire Fire Dump	Frederick Co.		10/15/1984	06/10/1986	09/27/2002	–	09/30/2005
VAD003127578	Saltville Waste Disposal Ponds	Smyth Co.						
VAD003117389	Saunders Supply Company	City of Suffolk						
VA5170000181	St. Julien's Creek Annex (USNavy)	City of Chesapeake	Site contaminated with metals and PAHs.	02/04/2000	07/27/2000	–	–	–
VAD980917983	Suffolk City Landfill	City of Suffolk		06/24/1988	02/21/1990	09/30/1992	–	01/24/1995
VAD980705404	U.S. Titanium	Nelson Co.						

== See also ==
- List of Superfund sites in the United States
- List of environmental issues
- List of waste types
- TOXMAP
