= Climate change in Virginia =

Climate change in the US state of Virginia

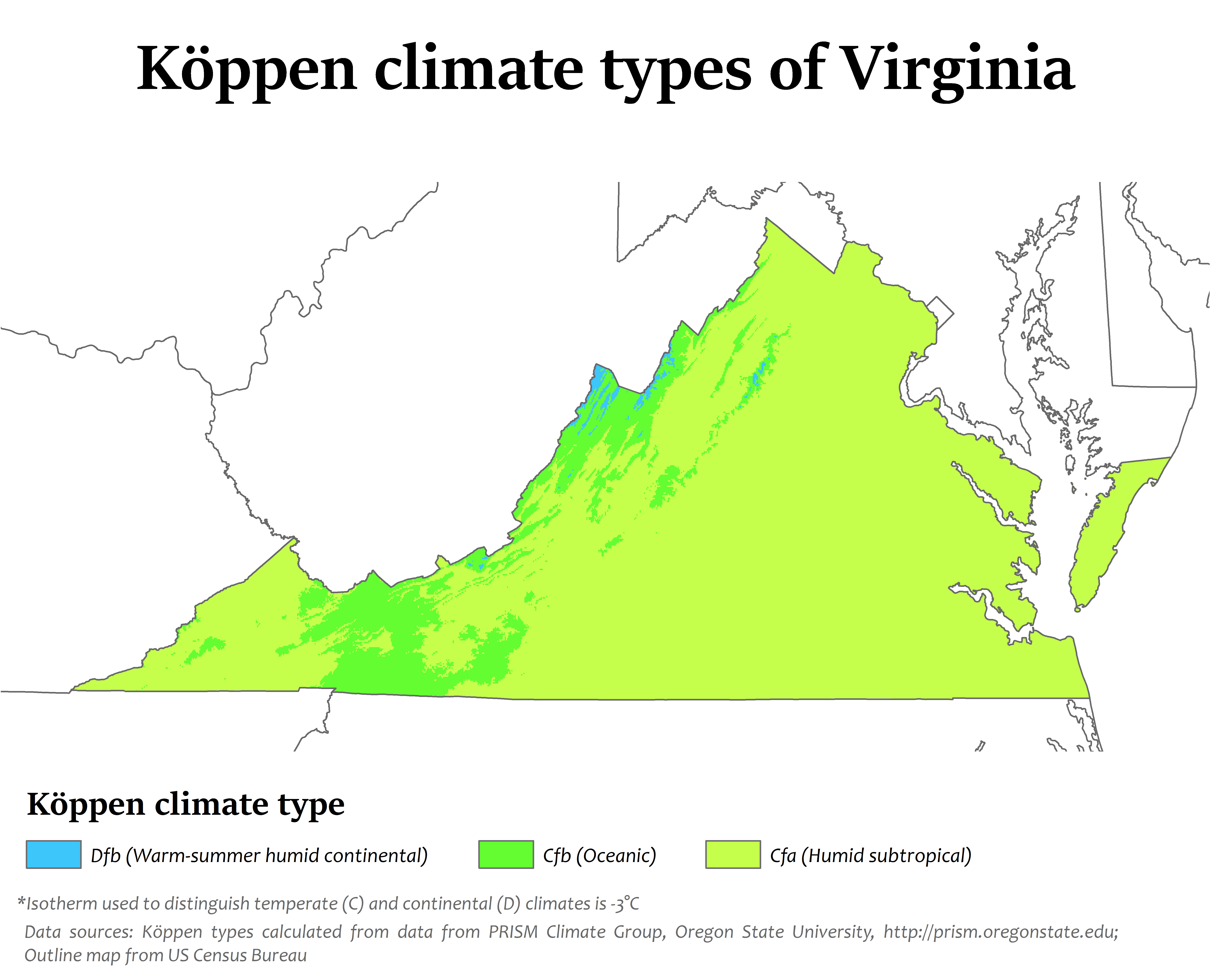
Köppen climate types in Virginia.

Climate change in Virginia encompasses the effects of climate change, attributed to man-made increases in atmospheric carbon dioxide in the U.S. state of Virginia.

The United States Environmental Protection Agency reports:

"Virginia's climate is changing. Most of the state has warmed about one degree (F) in the last century, and the sea is rising one to two inches every decade. Higher water levels are eroding beaches, submerging low lands, exacerbating coastal flooding, and increasing the salinity of estuaries and aquifers. The southeastern United States has warmed less than most of the nation. But in the coming decades, the region's changing climate is likely to reduce crop yields, harm livestock, increase the number of unpleasantly hot days, and increase the risk of heat stroke and other heat-related illnesses".

== Climate policy in Virginia ==
Several local communities have enacted plans to limit the effects of climate change. In the wake of Hurricane Matthew and the flooding of over 2,000 homes, the city of Virginia Beach took an unusual and aggressive stance on some new floodplain developments. The city rejected plans for building in the floodplain by large developers. The subsequent lawsuit and legal judgment may result in far-reaching consequences for future local climate change adaptation. After the developers took the city to court over the rejected plans, the courts ruled the city's actions acceptable. This makes future land buybacks and risky development project rejection more palatable from a legal perspective in the future.

After Hurricane Matthew, Norfolk purchased land from 18 landowners whose homes were destroyed in the hurricane. Some community-members and developers in Norfolk expressed similar concerns about tax base and growth, as were discussed in Virginia Beach and elsewhere regarding retreat.

== Observed effects of climate change ==
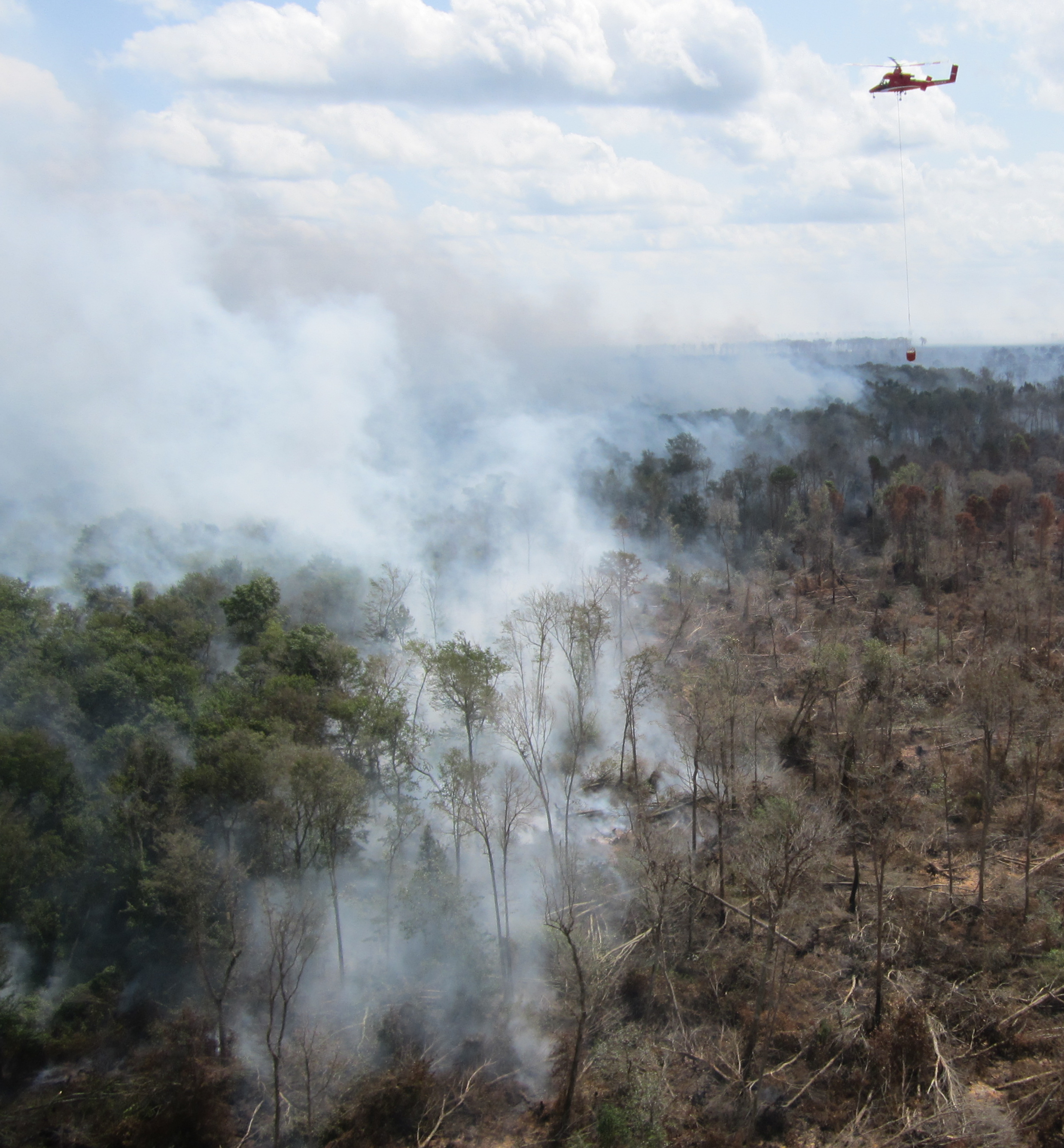
A helicopter fighting wildfires in the Great Dismal Swamp.

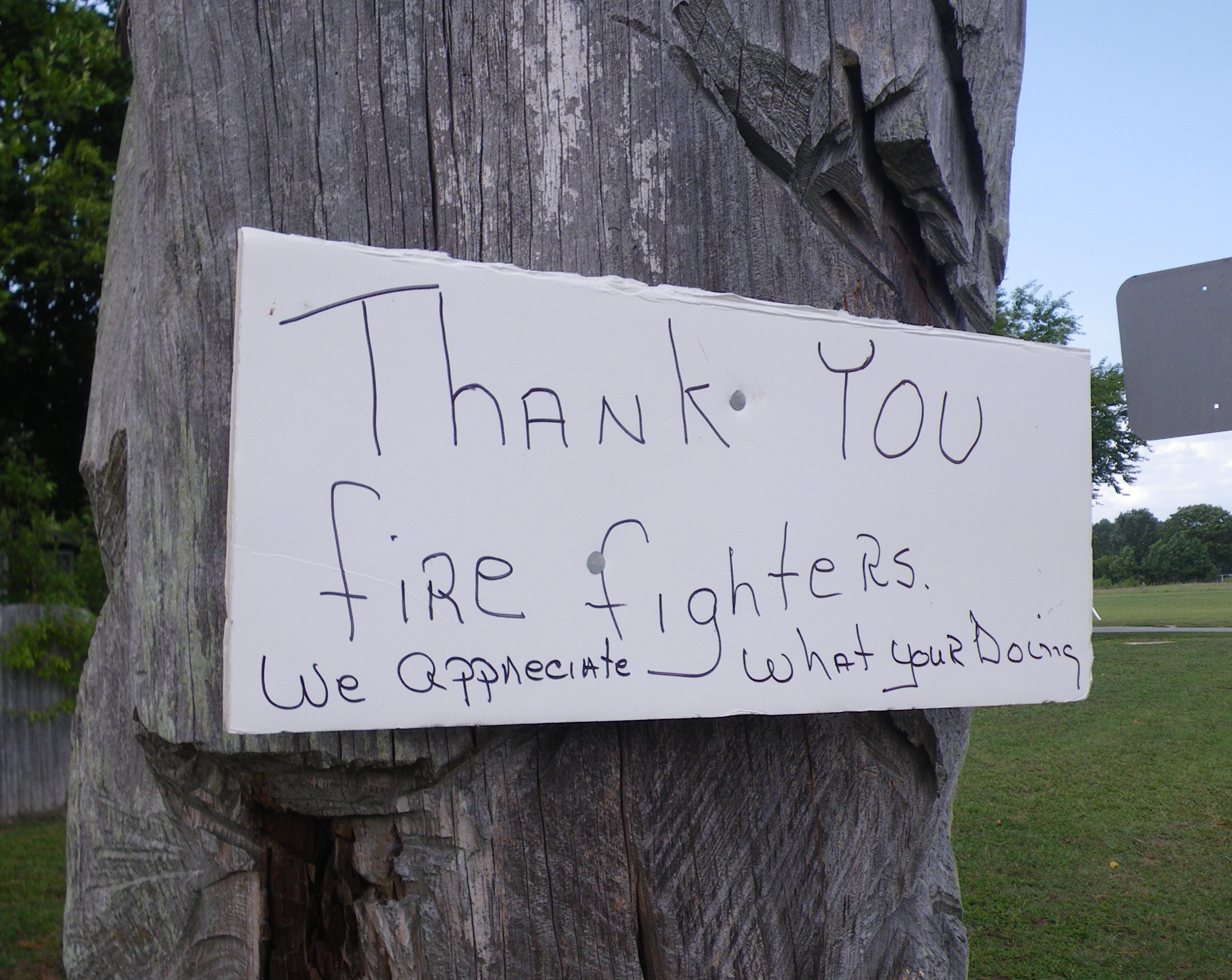
A sign thanking firefighters from a 2011 wildfire.

Documentation shows that tropical storms and hurricanes have intensified over the past 20 years. Despite there being more potential energy in warming oceans, scientists are not sure if the recent intensification will become a long-term trend. What is a given, though, is that hurricane wind speeds and rainfall will likely increase as the climate warms.

In June 2019, it was reported that climate change was already having an effect on local fishing industries, causing declines in some fish populations that had long been found in Virginia waters.

Already, there has been a measured change in Virginia's weather. In 2022, the amount of extreme heat days in Richmond was eight more than the amount of extreme heat days experienced in 1979.

== Projected effects of climate change ==
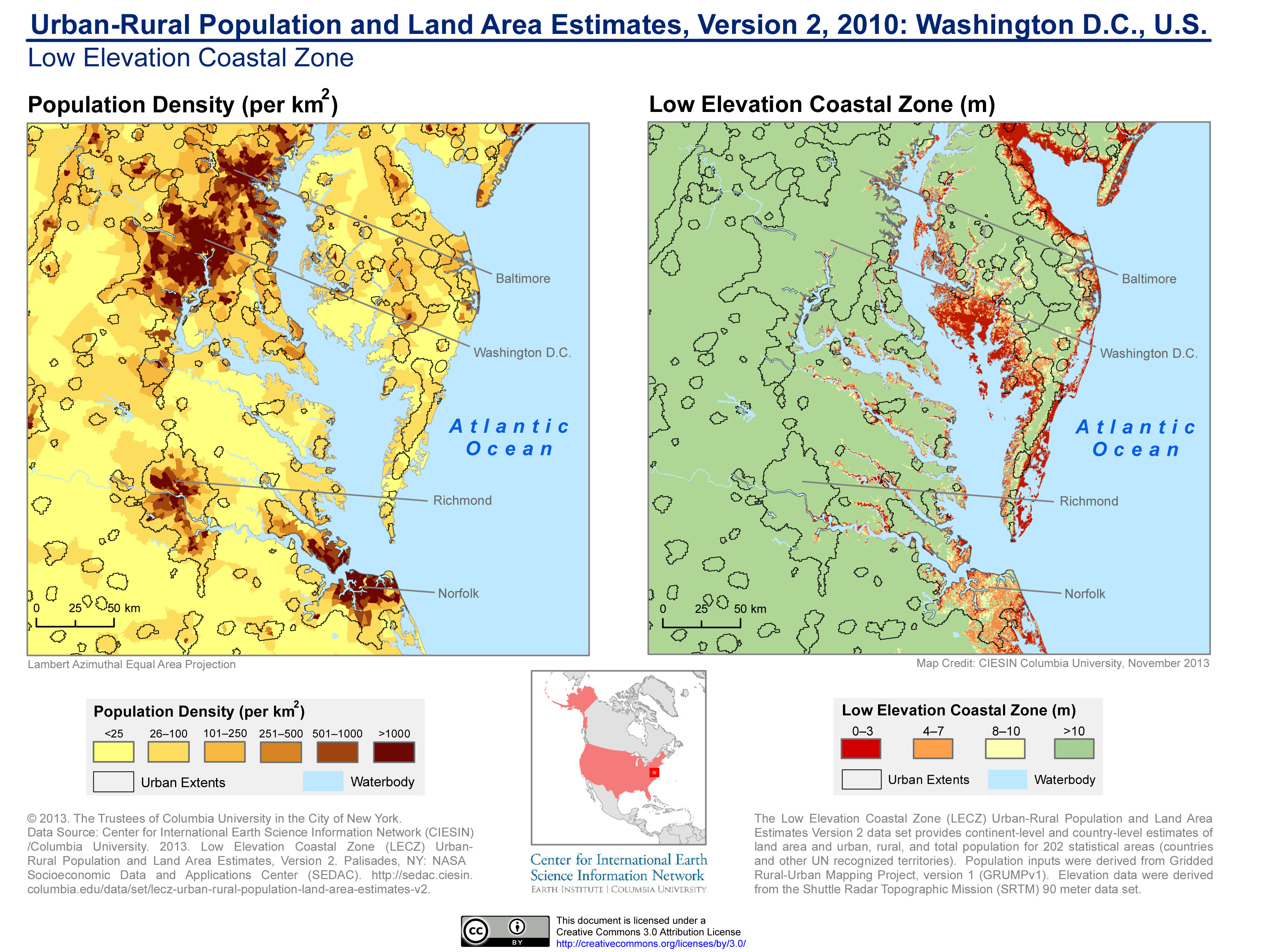
Population density and elevation above sea level around the Chesapeake Bay (2010).

It is predicted that seventy years from now, temperatures are more likely to be above 95°F approximately 20 to 40 days per year in the southeastern half of the state. This is in comparison to the 10 days a year in 2016. This will result in more air conditioning usage, which will strain the electrical grid.

On average, the sea level along Virginia's coast is increasing, mainly due to the land sinking. Such sinking is exacerbated by the withdrawal of groundwater faster than it can be replaced. The combination of both sea level rise and the sinking of land has resulted in costal Virginia experiencing one of the fastest sea level rise in the United States. If the average temperature of the oceans and atmosphere continue to rise, it is predicted that Virginia's sea level will rise sixteen inches to four feet in the next century.

Due to increased sea levels, the lowest dry land is submerged, morphing into tidal wetland or open water. The freshwater wetlands found in the upper tidal areas of the Potomac, Rappahannock, James, and York rivers create their own land by capturing floating sediments, and are predicted to keep pace with the rising sea over the next 100 years. But, the majority of the salt marshes located along the brackish areas of these rivers and the Chesapeake Bay are at risk of being lost if the seas rise by three feet. The wetlands found in Back Bay National Wildlife Refuge and the North Landing River are more vulnerable, as those are at risk of vanishing if the sea levels rise by only two feet. In general, the state is at risk of losing as much as 89% of the current tidal wetlands by 2080 due to climate change if there is not proper mitigation.

Overall, a higher ocean level increases the chances that storm waters will wash over barrier islands or open new inlets. It is estimated by the United States Geological Survey that Virginia's barrier islands are at risk of being lost to erosion or being broken up by new inlets if the sea level rises two feet by 2100. This same beach erosion will put the oceanfront property of Virginia Beach under threat unless measures are taken to offset erosion. Bay beaches and tidal flats are also at risk from the rising sea levels.

Another result of sea level rise is salt water mixing with freshwater further inland and upstream, affecting bodies of water like bays, rivers, and wetlands. This can result in groundwater becoming contaminated, along with soils becoming to salty for farming and/or forests. An example is how the York River has freshwater swamps along its tidal tributaries that contain standing dead trees from saltwater.

Ignoring whether or not storms increase in intensity, coastal infrastructure and homes will face higher flooding rates as the sea level rises. This is because the higher sea levels will result in higher storm surges, therefore putting more people at risk. A lot of roads, ports, and railways are at risk to the impacts caused directly by higher sea levels and storms. Most of the densely populated Hampton Roads area is at risk of being flooded by a major hurricane, with the area already experiencing a dramatic increase of street flooding over the past few years. The Poquoson and other communities along the Chesapeake are so close to sea level that water found in roadside ditches moves with the tides. Higher sea levels and more intense storms will cause more flooding in those communities, causing an increase in flood insurance rates and higher deductibles for wind damage found in homeowner insurance policies.

The increased amount of rainfall could further exacerbate flooding across the state. The average amount of precipitation during heavy storms increased by 27 percent between 1958 and 2012 in the southeast portion of Virginia. This trend of increasingly severe rainstorms is predicted to continue if climate change remains untouched.

=== Coastal ecosystems ===
The loss of tidal marshes has the ability to cause harm to the fish and birds that depend on these marshes for food and/or shelter. The small insects and marine organisms that reside in the marshes are important food sources for rockfish, crabs, and other commercially important species. The bluefish, sea trout, striped bass, and summer flounder will go in and out of these marshes for shelter and food. Along the Chesapeake Bay, various birds inhabit the most vulnerable marshes, like the bald eagle, great blue heron, snowy egret, and American black duck. The marshes along the Atlantic coast provide forage for shorebirds like sandpipers and plovers. There are also several species of geese and ducks that winter over in the marshes.

Bay beaches are a key habitat for the diamondback terrapin, which uses these beaches as nesting ground. Losing bay beaches would not only cause harm to the terrapin, but also to tiger beetles, sand fleas, snails, several crab species, and horseshoe crabs. When these species disappear, birds would lose an important food source along with them. The changing temperatures would also disrupt ecosystems, as if water temperatures exceed 86°F in the summertime, eelgrass would be at risk of being lost. This would cause a loss of habitat for the summer flounder, bay scallop, and the blue crab. Canvasback ducks, brants, and American black ducks would also lose a source of food.

=== Agriculture ===
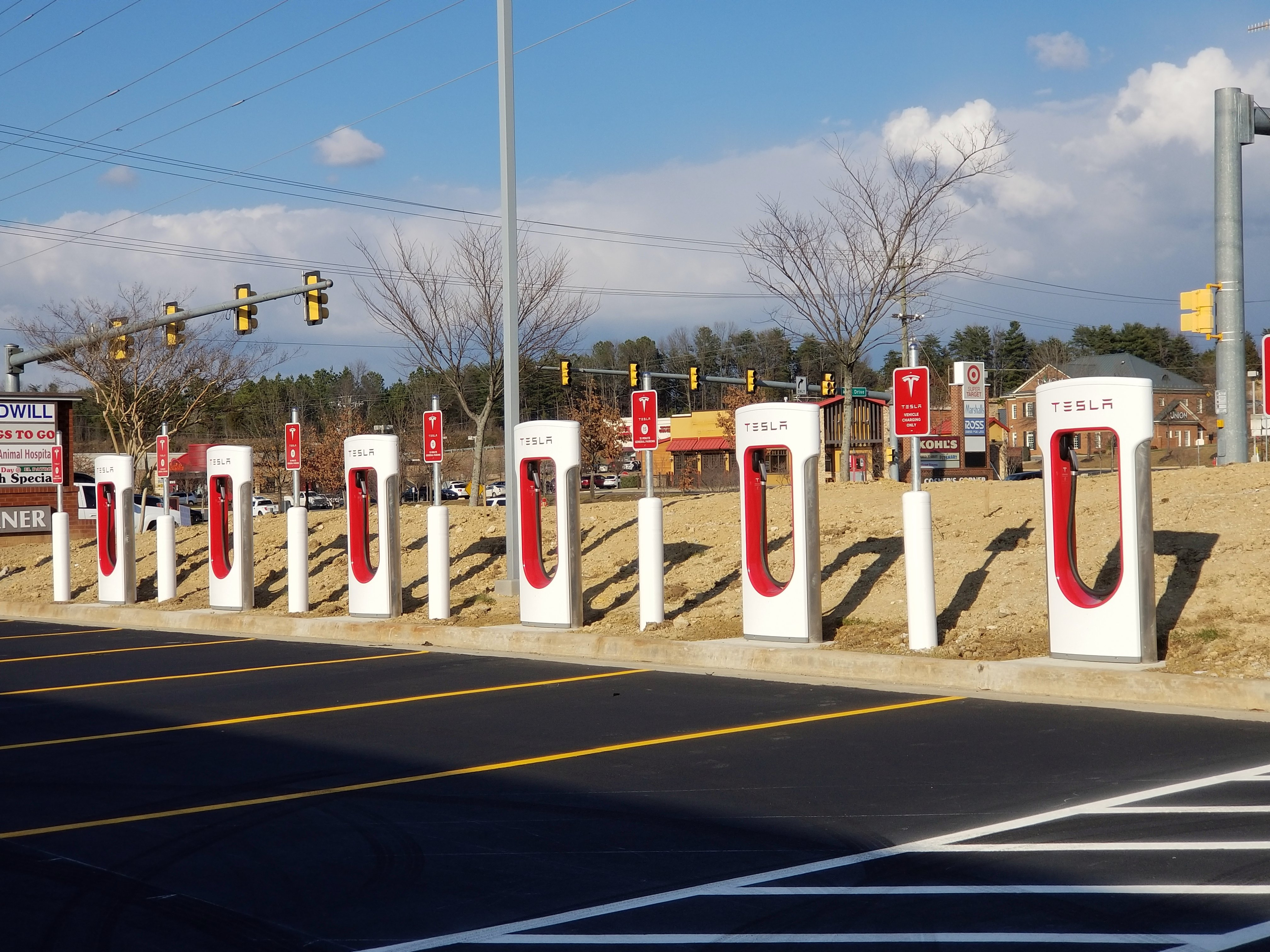
Tesla Superchargers in Fredericksburg.

The changes in the climate will result in both harmful and beneficial effects on farming. The higher temperatures are predicted to cause a reduction in livestock productivity. This is due to how heat stress causes disruptions to animals' metabolism.

It is theorized that, over the next few decades, hotter summers will decrease corn yields. But, at the same time, the higher concentrations of atmospheric CO2 could cause an increase in crop yields, with the fertilizing effect offsetting the harmful effects of heat on crops like cotton, wheat and peanuts (assuming that there is adequate water levels). As temperatures rise, the need for irrigation will increase, causing a greater strain on available resources. Where there is already scarce water, the increasingly severe droughts will likely cause a reduction in crop yields. At the same time, though, the rainfall in Virginia will become less spread out over a period of time and more clustered around certain events, causing an increase in erosion and dangerous flooding.

== See also ==
- Plug-in electric vehicles in Virginia
