= Area codes 334 and 483 =

Area code in southeastern Alabama, United States

Coordinates: 31°45′N 85°50′W

Southeastern Alabama numbering plan area 334

Area codes 334 and 483 are telephone area codes in the North American Numbering Plan (NANP) for southeastern Alabama. 334 was created on January 15, 1995, in an area code split of area code 205, in which the Montgomery and Mobile Local Access and Transport Areas (LATAs) received the new code. It was the first new area code in Alabama since the introduction of the area code system in 1947. To permit a transition period for the reconfiguration of equipment, such as computers and fax machines, calls terminating in the new numbering plan area (NPA) could be dialed by either area code 205 through May 13, 1995. 483 was added in 2026 forming an overlay complex.

The numbering plan area was the southern half of Alabama, comprising the Montgomery, Auburn-Opelika, and Dothan metropolitan areas, as well as Phenix City, and the Alabama side of the Columbus, Georgia metro area.

In 2001, the southwestern part of the numbering plan area was split off with Area code 251, including Mobile.

Area code 334 was the first interchangeable NPA code, not having the middle digit of 0 or 1, officially preceding Washington area code 360 by one minute.

NANPA projections in 2023 suggested an impending exhaustion of central office codes in southeastern Alabama by early 2026. On March 5, 2024 the Alabama Public Service Commission approved an all-services distributed overlay with the new area code 483 for relief with an in-service date of February 23, 2026. For customer education, permissive ten-digit dialing was scheduled for the period from July 23, 2025 to January 23, 2026, after which ten-digit dialing became mandatory.

== See also ==
- List of Alabama area codes
- List of North American Numbering Plan area codes

Alabama area codes: 205/659, 251, 256/938, 334
	North: 205/659, 256/938	
West: 205/659, 251	334/483	East: 706/762, 229
	South: 251, 850	
Georgia area codes: 229, 404, 478, 678/470/943, 706/762, 770, 912
Florida area codes: 239, 305/786/645, 321, 352, 386, 407/689, 561/728, 727, 772, 813/656, 850/448, 863, 904/324, 941, 954/754
