= Area code 242 =

Telephone area code of The Bahamas

Coordinates: 24°15′N 76°00′W

Area code 242 is the telephone area code in the North American Numbering Plan (NANP) for The Bahamas. The area code was created on October 1, 1996, in a split of the Caribbean numbering plan area (NPA) with area code 809. A permissive dialing period allowed the use of area code 809 until March 31, 1997.

When in The Bahamas, only the seven-digit number is required for local calls, but to call the Bahamas from other countries within the North American Numbering Plan, e.g., the United States, and Canada, the local number is prefixed with 1 and 242.

242 spells BHA, an abbreviation of Bahamas on the alphanumeric telephone keypad.

== See also ==
- List of North American Numbering Plan area codes
- Area codes in the Caribbean

Bahamas area codes: 242
	North: Atlantic Ocean	
West: 305/786, 754/954, 561	242	East: Atlantic Ocean
	South: 649, country code +53 in Cuba	
Florida area codes: 239, 305/786/645, 321, 352, 386, 407/689, 561/728, 727, 772, 813/656, 850/448, 863, 904/324, 941, 954/754
Turks and Caicos Islands area codes: 649
