= Area code 912 =

Telephone area code for southeastern Georgia, United States

Coordinates: 32.08233°N 81.09652°W

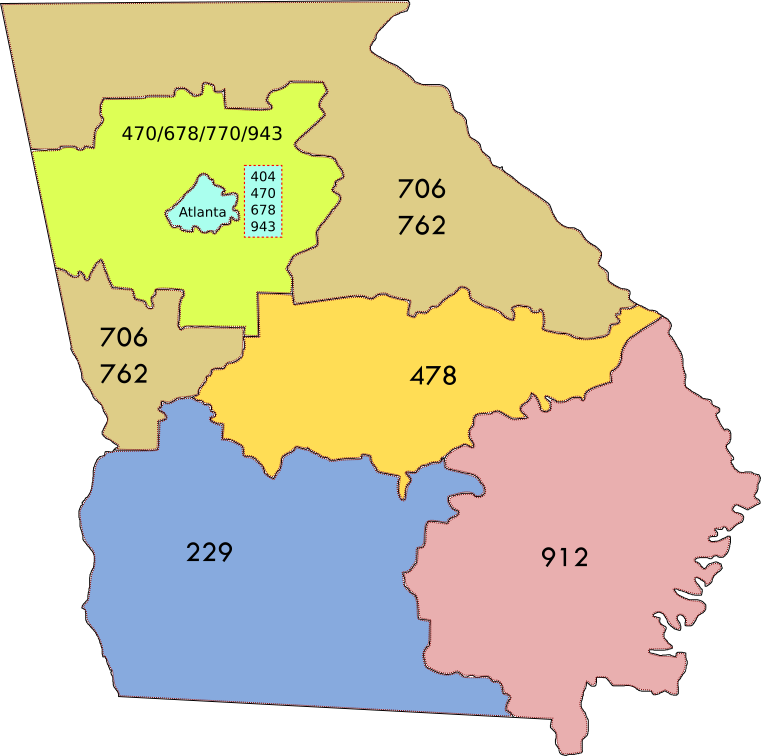

Area code 912 is a telephone area code in the North American Numbering Plan (NANP) for the southeastern part of the U.S. state of Georgia. The numbering plan area contains Savannah, Richmond Hill, Hinesville, Vidalia, Metter, Reidsville, Homerville, Waycross, Brunswick, Folkston, Douglas, Statesboro, Ludowici, Jesup and Kingsland. The area code was created in 1954 in an area code split from area code 404, which had been assigned to the entire state in 1947.

In May 2025, the Georgia Public Service Commission announced the future conversion of the NPA into an overlay complex with new area code 565 in relief of anticipated central office code exhaustion by 2028.

== History ==
In 1947, when the American Telephone and Telegraph Company (AT&T) divided North America into numbering plan areas (NPAs) for the first nationwide telephone numbering plan, the state of Georgia received only one area code, 404, for the entire state. The city of Atlanta operated one of the eight Regional Centers in the nationwide telephone toll routing system.

On July 1, 1954, the state was divided into two numbering plan areas. The area from Macon southward, including Savannah and Albany, received area code 912. Area code 404 was reduced to the northern half of the state, from the Tennessee and North Carolina borders as far south as Columbus and Augusta.

Despite the presence of Savannah, Albany and Macon, the southern half of Georgia is not nearly as densely populated as the northern half. As a result, 912 remained the sole area code for south Georgia for 46 years. In contrast, north Georgia went from one numbering plan area to three during the 1990s, plus an overlay for the Atlanta area. By the end of the 1990s, 912 was facing exhaustion due to the proliferation of cell phones and pagers, especially in Savannah, Macon, and Albany.

On August 1, 2000, area code 912 was reduced in size in a three-way split to permit more central office codes in the southern half of the state. Savannah and the eastern portion retained 912. The western portion, centered on Albany, was assigned area code 229, while the northern portion, centered on Macon, received area code 478. Permissive dialing of 912 continued across southern Georgia until August 1, 2001.

Prior to October 2021, area code 912 had telephone numbers assigned for the central office code 988. In 2020, 988 was designated nationwide as a dialing code for the National Suicide Prevention Lifeline, which created a conflict for exchanges that permit seven-digit dialing. This area code was therefore scheduled to transition to ten-digit dialing by October 24, 2021.

NANPA projections of October 2022 suggested that the coastal Georgia NPA will require exhaustion relief around 2027. An overlay complex with 912 and area code 565 was approved in May 2025.

=== Service area ===
Numbering plan area 912 includes the counties of Appling, Atkinson, Bacon, Brantley, Bryan, Bulloch, Camden, Candler, Charlton, Chatham, Clinch, Coffee, Echols (part with area code 229), Effingham, Emanuel (part with area code 478), Evans, Glynn, Jeff Davis, Liberty, Long, McIntosh, Montgomery, Pierce, Screven, Tattnall, Telfair (part with area code 229), Toombs, Treutlen, Ware, Wayne, and Wheeler.

== See also ==
- List of Georgia area codes
- List of North American Numbering Plan area codes

Georgia area codes: 229, 404, 478, 678/470/943, 706/762, 770, 912
	North: 478, 803/839, 843/854	
West: 229	912	East: Atlantic Ocean, 441
	South: 386, 324/904	
South Carolina area codes: 803/839, 843/854, 864/821
Florida area codes: 239, 305/786/645, 321, 352, 386, 407/689, 561/728, 727, 772, 813/656, 850/448, 863, 904/324, 941, 954/754
