= Georgia State Route 93 =

State highway in Georgia, United States

State Route 93
- SR 93 highlighted in red

Route information
- Maintained by GDOT
- Length: 60.9 mi (98.0 km)

Major junctions
- South end: US 319 / SR 35 in Thomasville
- SR 111 from Cairo to north of Cairo; US 84 / SR 38 / SR 188 in Cairo; US 19 / SR 3 / SR 300 in Pelham; SR 37 near Sale City; SR 112 in Lester
- North end: US 19 / SR 3 / SR 300 in Baconton

Location
- Country: United States
- State: Georgia
- Counties: Grady, Thomas, Mitchell

Highway system
- Georgia State Highway System; Interstate; US; State; Special
← SR 92	→ SR 94

State Route 93 (SR 93) is a state highway in southwest part of the U.S. state of Georgia. The highway runs 60.9 miles (98.0 km) from near Thomasville north to Cairo, north to Pelham, northeast to Hinsonton, north to Lester, and west to Baconton.

== Route ==
SR 93 begins at an intersection with US 319/SR 35 near Thomasville, in the southeastern part of Grady County And Thomas County. It heads north-northwest. After traveling through Beachton, it curves to the north-northeast. It curves to a nearly due-northwestern direction before going to the north. The highway curves to the northwest before crossing over the Ochlockonee River. Northwest of this crossing is one over Little Tired Creek. A short distance later, it enters Cairo. It intersects the western terminus of 12th Avenue SE, which leads to Grady General Hospital. The highway then curves back to a northerly direction. Between 6th Avenue SE and Syrupmaker Drive, it passed Cairo High School. At its intersection with SR 111 (4th Avenue SE), the two highways begin a concurrency. An intersection with the western terminus of a different segment of 4th Avenue SE leads to the Heritage Industrial Complex. Between 2nd Avenue SE and 1st Avenue NE, they cross over some railroad tracks of CSX. At 1st Avenue NE, they intersect the western terminus of SR 38 Spur. A few blocks later, they intersect US 84/SR 38 and the western terminus of SR 188, which takes on the 5th Street NE name. Here, SR 93 and SR 111 turn left and follow US 84 and SR 38 for approximately five blocks. At North Broad Street, SR 93 and SR 111 split off from US 84/SR 38. The two highways travel to the north-northeast. After curving to a nearly due-north direction, they leave the city. They curve to the northeast and cross over Little Tired Creek. A short distance later SR 111 splits off to the northeast, while SR 93 curves to the north. It crosses over West Branch Barnetts Creek and then Big Branch. The highway curves back to the northeast and enters the south-central portion of Mitchell County.

SR 93 curves to the north for a brief portion before resuming its northeastern direction. It intersects the eastern terminus of SR 262. The highway enters the city limits of Pelham. It passes Pelham High School and Pelham Elementary School. At Grady Street, the highway turns left onto Church Street and heads to the north-northwest. At the southwestern corner of an intersection of Mathewson Avenue SW, it passes the headquarters for the Pelham City School District. It curves to the north and intersects the eastern terminus of SR 65 (Hand Avenue). Here, SR 93 turns right and travels to the east. Between West Rail Road Street and East Rail Road Street, it crosses over some railroad tracks of CSX. The highway turns left onto East Rail Road Street and travels to the north-northwest. Almost immediately, it curves to the northeast, off of East Rail Road Street and onto Curry Street. The highway curves to the east-southeast Just prior to leaving the city is the first intersection with US 19/SR 3/SR 300. It curves back to the northeast and crosses over Big Creek. After crossing over Little Creek, it travels through Cotton. SR 93 then crosses over Lost Creek before beginning a curve to the north-northeast just to the southwest of Hinsonton. South-southwest of Sale City is an intersection with SR 37. The highway curves to the north-northeast and crosses over the Little Ochlockonee River. Then, it enters Sale City and curves to the north. On the southeastern corner of the intersection with Maple Street is the Sale City Public Library. About three blocks later, it intersects the western terminus of SR 270. After leaving the city, it curves to the north-northwest and then back to the north-northeast. It crosses over Raccoon Creek. The highway curves to the northwest and then to the north. In Lester, the highway intersects SR 112 and the southern terminus of Gravel Hill Road. Here, SR 93 turns left, onto SR 112, and travels to the southwest. SR 93 splits off of SR 112 and travels to the west-northwest. It curves to a northwesterly direction. It makes a gradual curve to the southwest and then to the west-southwest. It curves to the west and passes the North Mitchell County Elementary School. On the eastern edge of the city limits of Baconton, it meets its northern terminus, the second intersection with US 19/SR 3/SR 300. Here, the roadway continues as Lester Road NE.

The only portion of SR 93 that is part of the National Highway System, a system of routes determined to be the most important for the nation's economy, mobility, and defense, is the entire length of the US 84/SR 38 concurrency in Cairo, on SR 111.

== Major intersections ==
County	Location	mi	km	Destinations	Notes
Grady	Beachton	0.0	0.0	US 319 / SR 35 – Tallahassee, Thomasville	Southern terminus
Grady	Cairo	12.0	19.3	SR 111 south (4th Avenue SE) – Calvary, Historic downtown	Southern end of SR 111 concurrency
Grady	Cairo	12.4	20.0	SR 38 Spur east (1st Avenue NE)	Western terminus of SR 38 Spur
Grady	Cairo	12.8	20.6	US 84 east / SR 38 east – Thomasville SR 188 east (5th Street NE north) – Ochlocknee	Southern end of US 84/SR 38 concurrency; western terminus of SR 188, which takes on the 5th Street NE name
Grady	Cairo	13.3	21.4	US 84 west / SR 38 west / North Broad Street south – Bainbridge, Historic downtown	Northern end of US 84/SR 38 concurrency
Grady		17.1	27.5	SR 111 north – Meigs	Northern end of SR 111 concurrency
Mitchell		29.6	47.6	SR 262 west – Vada, Climax	Eastern terminus of SR 262
Mitchell	Pelham	31.3	50.4	SR 65 west (Hand Avenue west) / Church Street north – Hopeful	Eastern terminus of SR 65, which takes on the Hand Avenue name
Mitchell	Pelham	31.5	50.7	Dixie Highway south (Railroad Street)	Southern end of Dixie Highway Scenic Byway concurrency
Mitchell	Pelham	31.8	51.2	Dixie Highway north (Glausier Street)	Northern end of Dixie Highway Scenic Byway concurrency
Mitchell	Pelham	32.3	52.0	US 19 / SR 3 / SR 300 – Thomasville, Albany	
Mitchell		43.5	70.0	SR 37 – Camilla, Moultrie	
Mitchell	Sale City	45.9	73.9	SR 270 east – Doerun	Western terminus of SR 270
Mitchell	Lester	53.9	86.7	SR 112 north / Gravel Hill Road north – Sylvester, Ashburn	Southern end of SR 112 concurrency; southern terminus of Gravel Hill Road
Mitchell	Lester	54.3	87.4	SR 112 south – Camilla	Northern end of SR 112 concurrency
Mitchell	Baconton	60.9	98.0	US 19 / SR 3 / SR 300 / Lester Road NE west – Camilla, Albany	Northern terminus; eastern terminus of Lester Road NE; former SR 93 north
1.000 mi = 1.609 km; 1.000 km = 0.621 mi: Concurrency terminus
