= National Register of Historic Places listings in Mitchell County, Georgia =

Mitchell County, Georgia, has 10 properties and districts listed on the National Register of Historic Places (NRHP).

This National Park Service list is complete through NPS recent listings posted September 4, 2026.

== Current listings ==
	Name on the Register	Image	Date listed	Location	City or town	Description
1	Bacon Family Homestead		November 25, 1983 (#83003591)	W. Durham St. and Albany Bainbridge Stage Rd. 31°22′43″N 84°10′24″W	Baconton	
2	Baconton Commercial Historic District	Baconton Commercial Historic District	December 1, 1983 (#83003603)	E. Walton and E. Durham Sts., N. Railroad and S. Railroad Aves., and GA 3; 31°22′30″N 84°09′42″W	Baconton	
3	Camilla Commercial Historic District	Camilla Commercial Historic District	April 18, 1985 (#85000862)	Roughly bounded by Broad, S. Scott and N. Scott Sts. 31°13′52″N 84°12′37″W	Camilla	
4	George W. Jackson House	George W. Jackson House	December 1, 1983 (#83003595)	333 E. Walton St. 31°22′30″N 84°09′11″W	Baconton	1898-built Late Victorian house now serving as Baconton's city hall
5	James Price McRee House	James Price McRee House	December 11, 1979 (#79000734)	181 E. Broad St. 31°13′50″N 84°12′07″W	Camilla	1907 Classical Revival-style house currently housing the Southern Georgia Regional Commission
6	Mount Enon Church and Cemetery		December 22, 1983 (#83003596)	Old Stage Coach Rd. 31°23′57″N 84°06′50″W	Baconton	
7	Pelham Commercial Historic District	Pelham Commercial Historic District	March 24, 1983 (#83000238)	Roughly bounded by RR tracks, Church, Blythe, Jackson Sts. & Hand Ave. 31°07′31″N 84°09′12″W	Pelham	
8	South Railroad Historic District	South Railroad Historic District	December 1, 1983 (#83003597)	S. Railroad Ave., GA 3, and Seaboard Coast Line RR tracks 31°22′16″N 84°09′51″W	Baconton	
9	Walton Street-Church Street Historic District	Walton Street-Church Street Historic District	December 1, 1983 (#83003602)	Walton and Church Sts. 31°22′29″N 84°09′24″W	Baconton	
10	Georgia Williams Nursing Home		April 8, 2011 (#11000180)	176 Dyer St. 31°14′12″N 84°12′28″W	Camilla	Georgia Traveler website
