= Greenough, Georgia =

- Unincorporated community
- Location within Georgia Location within the United States
- Coordinates: 31°19′00″N 84°06′06″W
- Country: United States
- State: Georgia
- County: Mitchell
- Elevation: 292 ft (89 m)
- Time zone: UTC-5 (Eastern (EST))
  - Summer (DST): UTC-4 (EDT)
- ZIP code: 31730
- Area code: 229
- GNIS feature ID: 326307

Greenough is an unincorporated community located in Mitchell County, Georgia, United States. It lies at the intersection of GA 112, Stage Coach, Tuton and Greenough roads. Palm Road also is in the area.

== Geography ==
Greenough's latitude is at 31.317 and its longitude is at -84.102. Its elevation rests at 292 feet (89 m). Greenough appears on the Sale City U.S. Geological Survey Map.
