= Greenwood, Georgia =

- Unincorporated community
- Location within Georgia Location within the United States
- Coordinates: 31°11′53″N 84°20′24″W
- Country: United States
- State: Georgia
- County: Mitchell
- Elevation: 151 ft (46 m)
- Time zone: UTC-5 (Eastern (EST))
  - Summer (DST): UTC-4 (EDT)
- ZIP code: 31730
- Area code: 229

Greenwood is an unincorporated community located in Mitchell County, Georgia, United States.

== History ==
Greenwood was laid out about 1880 and named for the live oak trees near the original town site.

== Geography ==
Greenwood sits on the intersection of GA Highway 97 and Greenwood Road. Fox Run Road, Kurbo Lane, Pipeline Road, Sassafras Tea Road, Richards Lane, and Flats Road also rest in the area.

Greenwood's latitude is at 31.198 and its longitude is at -84.34. Its elevation rests at 151 feet (46 m). Greenwood appears on the Branchville U.S. Geological Survey Map.

== Churches ==
The Greenwood Free Will Baptist Church sits in the area as well as the Anitoch Baptist Church.
