= Flint, Georgia =

- Unincorporated community
- Location within Georgia Location within the United States
- Coordinates: 31°18′59″N 84°10′45″W
- Country: United States
- State: Georgia
- County: Mitchell
- Elevation: 184 ft (56 m)
- Time zone: UTC-5 (Eastern (EST))
  - Summer (DST): UTC-4 (EDT)
- ZIP code: 31716
- Area code: 229

Flint is an unincorporated community located in Mitchell County, Georgia, United States.

== History ==
The community was named after the Flint River. An early variant name was "Cochrans Mill".

== Geography ==
Flint's latitude is at 31.317 and its longitude is at -84.179. Its elevation rests at 184 feet (56 m). Flint appears on the Baconton South U.S. Geological Survey Map and lies at the intersection of U.S. 19 and Tution Road. Flint Road, River Road, and Saint Mary's Road also lie in the area.
