= South Railroad Historic District =

Historic district in Georgia, United States

- U.S. National Register of Historic Places
- U.S. Historic district
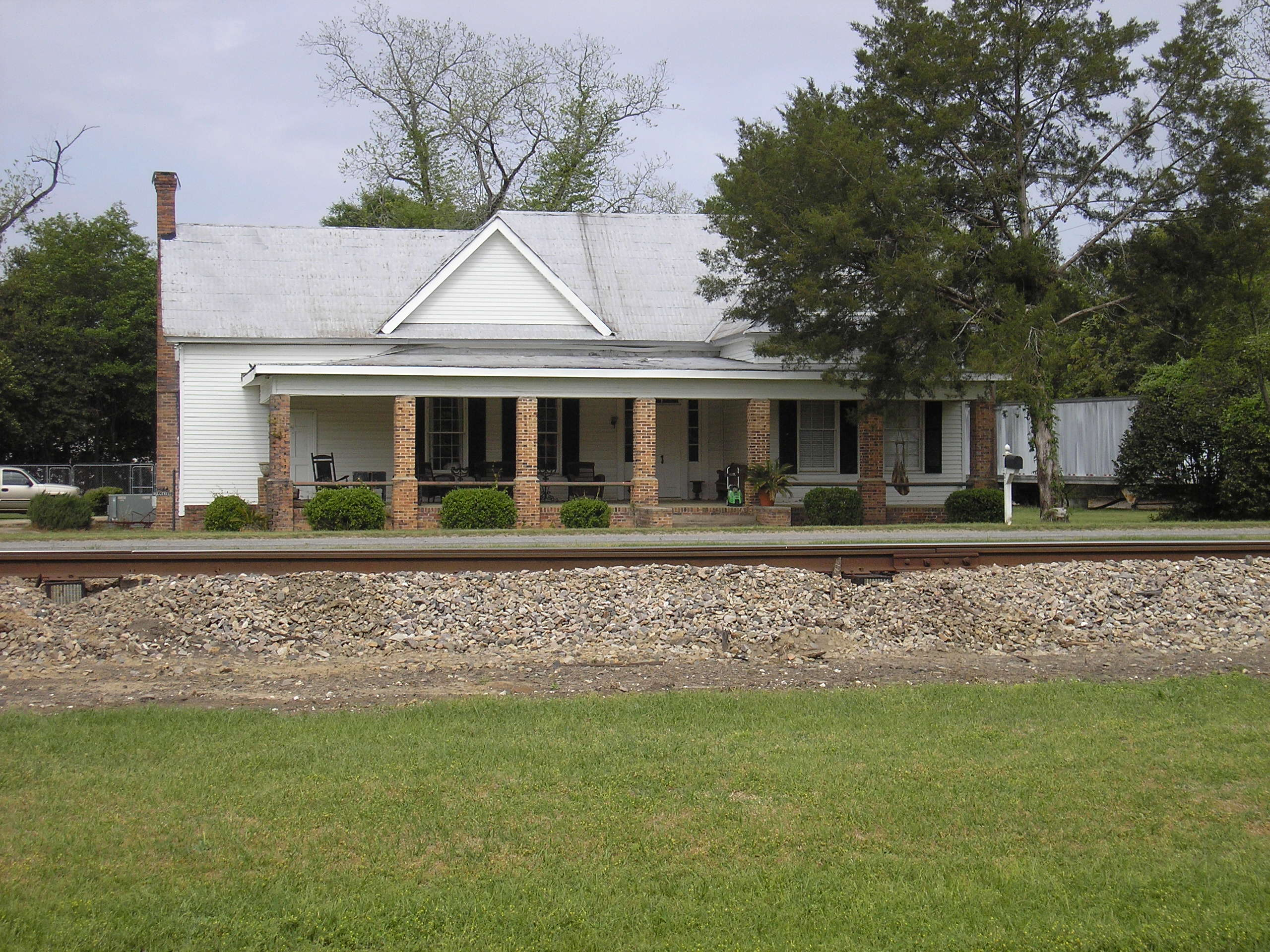

- Location within Georgia Location within the United States
- Location: S. Railroad Ave., GA 3, and Seaboard Coast Line RR tracks, Baconton
- Coordinates: 31.371111°N 84.164167°W
- Area: 22 acres (8.9 ha)
- Built: 1900
- Built by: Glausier, Thomas Jefferson
- Architectural style: Bungalow/craftsman, Late Victorian
- MPS: Baconton MRA
- NRHP reference No.: 83003597
- Added to NRHP: December 1, 1983

The South Railroad Historic District in Baconton, Georgia is a 22-acre (8.9 ha) historic district that was listed on the National Register of Historic Places in 1983.

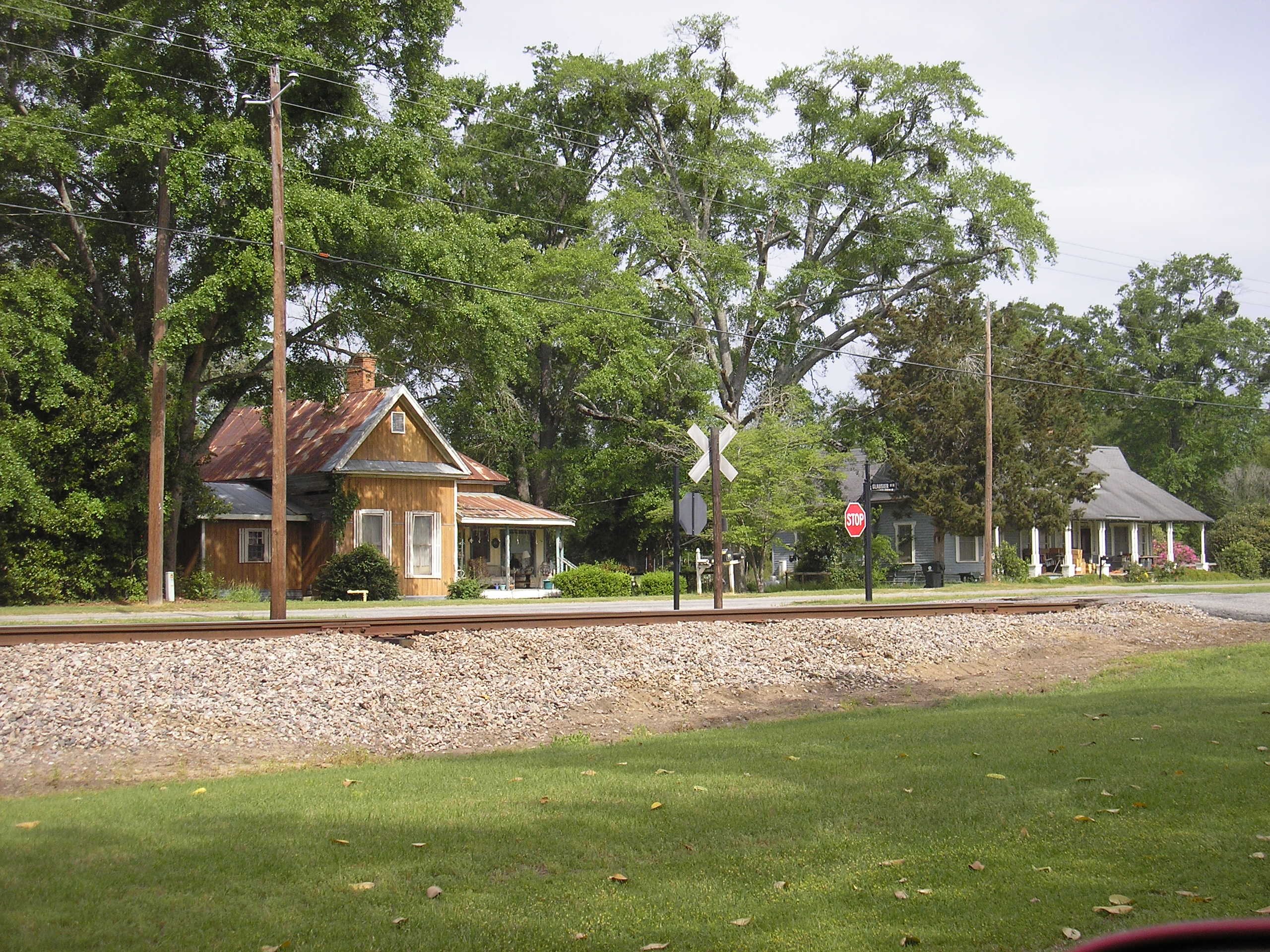

It included seven one-story or one-and-a-half-story houses built before 1927 and a service station.

The district was one of three in Baconton listed on the National Register at the same time, as part of a review of all historic resources in Baconton, along with the George W. Jackson House.
