= Bacon Family Homestead =

Historic house in Georgia, United States

- U.S. National Register of Historic Places
- Location within Georgia Location within the United States
- Location: West of the intersection of Durham St. and the old Albany-Bainbridge Stage Rd., vicinity of Baconton, Georgia
- Coordinates: 31.37856°N 84.17335°W
- Area: 443.8 acres (179.6 ha)
- Built: 1913
- Built by: Multiple
- Architectural style: Rustic
- NRHP reference No.: 83003591
- Added to NRHP: November 25, 1983

The Bacon Family Homestead is a 443.8-acre (1.796 km^{2}) property in Mitchell County, Georgia which was listed on the National Register of Historic Places in 1983.

It is associated with Robert J. Bacon, Jr. (1880-1946), who helped establish Baconton's first "crackery", a pecan shelling plant, in 1919.

The homestead includes an early twentieth century rustic style house, a historic outbuilding, locations of several former outbuildings, historic landscape features, and a pecan grove on a narrow property that extends to the Flint River. The house is a one-story with unpainted board and batten siding. Carpentry detailing includes eaves that are boxed and returned.
