= Mount Enon Church and Cemetery =

Historic church in Georgia, United States

- U.S. National Register of Historic Places
- Location within Georgia Location within the United States
- Nearest city: Baconton, Georgia
- Coordinates: 31°23′57″N 84°6′50″W
- Area: 8 acres (3.2 ha)
- Built: 1889
- NRHP reference No.: 83003596
- Added to NRHP: December 22, 1983

Mount Enon Church and Cemetery is a historic church in Mitchell County, Georgia near Baconton. It is a one-story wood frame country church built in 1889 on a brick pier foundation.

It was added to the National Register in 1983, and then was the third-oldest church in the county.

It served the community of Gum Pond, which had population of 400 at one point, until the community, which could not compete with Baconton, disappeared. The church is the only remaining building of that community and ceased services in 1928. In the era of its National Register listing, it was the center for an annual commemorative event by descendants of the congregation.
