= Mitchell County High School =

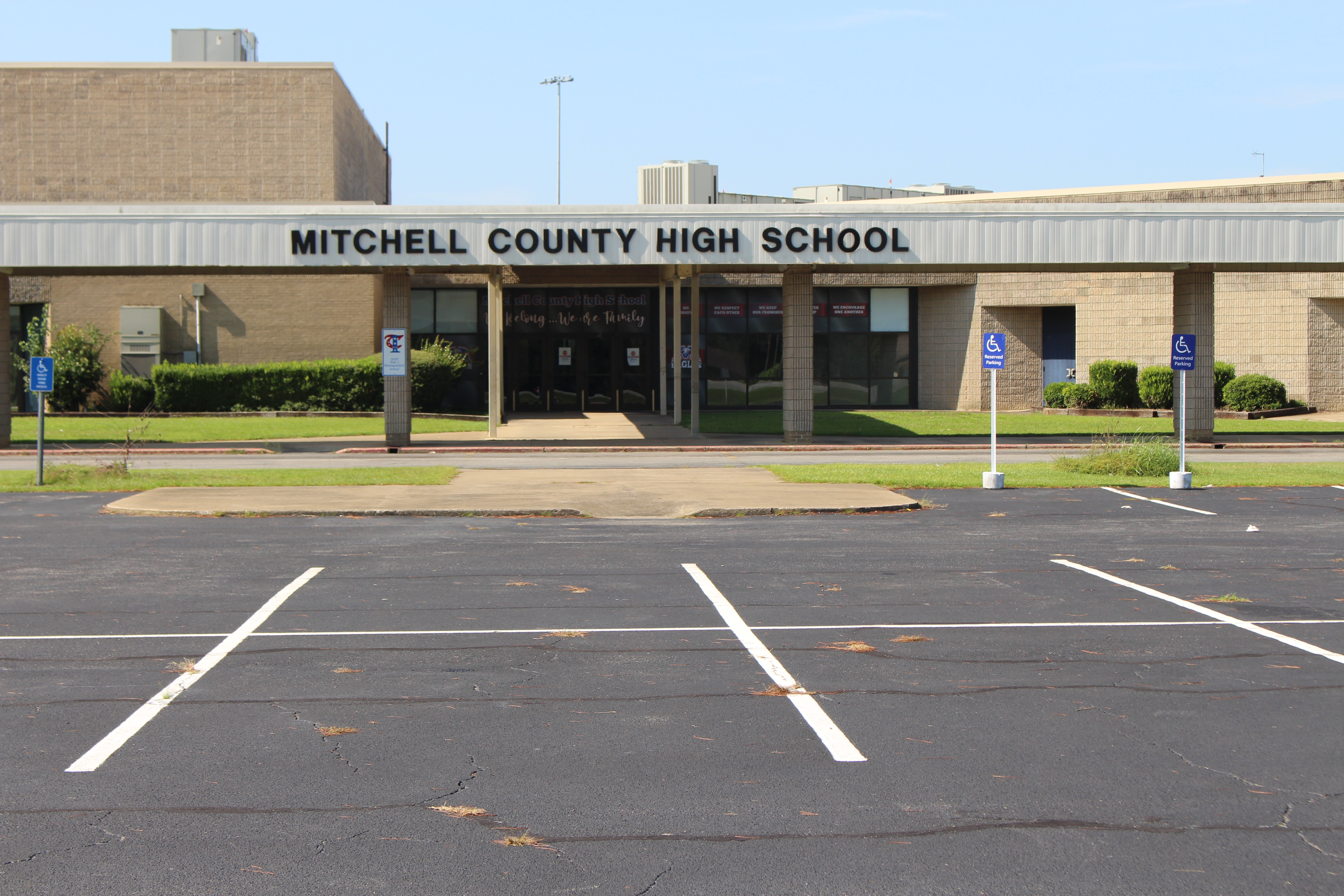

Location
- 1000 Newton Road; Camilla, Georgia 31730-5411; United States; 31°14′37″N 84°14′21″W

Information
- Type: Public secondary
- Motto: Be at the RIGHT place, at the RIGHT time, doing the RIGHT thing and you will NEVER go wrong.
- Established: Mitchell-Baker High School (1981 - 2008) Mitchell County High School (2008 - present)
- Oversight: Mitchell County School District
- Principal: Anthony Brown
- Teaching staff: 38.60 (FTE)
- Grades: 9-12
- Enrollment: 334 (2024-2025)
- Student to teacher ratio: 8.65
- Campus: Rural
- Colors: Red, white, and blue
- Mascot: Eagle
- Newspaper: Eagles Nest
- Distinctions: 2007 Governor's Cup, 48th in GHSGT ranking statewide
- Website: Mitchell County High School

Mitchell County High School is a secondary school located in Camilla, Georgia, United States. It is a part of the Mitchell County School District. The school educates students in grades 9–12.

Its district includes all areas in Mitchell County except for Pelham.

== Academics ==
Mitchell County High offers a curriculum that includes college prep, AP, and SWGTC courses, which allow students to earn college credit while working towards their high school diplomas.

MCHS has a Fine Arts department, which includes band.

== School stadium ==
Mitchell County High School's Eagle's Stadium is also used by Mitchell County Middle School. The stadium is located at Mitchell County High School in Camilla, Ga.

Home games for high school are played on Friday and Saturday nights; middle school and most junior varsity games are played on Thursdays.

== Sports ==
- Basketball (boys' and girls')
- Baseball
- Cheerleading
- Football
- Softball
- Track & Field
- Volleyball
- Tennis
- Esports (To come into effect in 2027)

== Administration ==
- Mr. Anthony Brown, Principal
- Mr. Ross Worsham, AP over Athletics & Discipline
- Ms. LaKeisha Coleman, AP over Curriculum, Instruction, & MTSS

== Notable alumni ==
- Jumaine Jones, professional basketball forward for Bnei HaSharon of Israel
- Al Pinkins, former assistant basketball coach for the Ole Miss Rebels men's basketball team
- Grover Stewart, NFL defensive tackle for the Indianapolis Colts
