= Saco, Georgia =

- Unincorporated community
- Location within Georgia Location within the United States
- Coordinates: 31°11′07″N 84°05′01″W
- Country: United States
- State: Georgia
- County: Mitchell
- Time zone: UTC-5 (Eastern (EST))
  - Summer (DST): UTC-4 (EDT)
- ZIP code: 31779
- Area code: 229

Saco is an unincorporated community located in Mitchell County, Georgia, United States.

== Geography ==
Saco is located at the intersection of Tanglewood Road and Stage Coach Road. John Collins Road, Drew C. White Road, Hinsonton Road, and Lake Pleasant Church Road lie in the area. Little Creek runs through the area.
