= Pebble City, Georgia =

- Unincorporated community
- Location within Georgia Location within the United States
- Coordinates: 31°14′52″N 84°04′40″W
- Country: United States
- State: Georgia
- County: Mitchell
- Elevation: 364 ft (111 m)
- Time zone: UTC-5 (Eastern (EST))
  - Summer (DST): UTC-4 (EDT)
- ZIP code: 31784
- Area code: 229

Pebble City is an unincorporated community located in Mitchell County, Georgia, United States.

== Geography ==
County Line sits at the intersection of Georgia Highway 37 and Pebble City Road. Stage Coach Road, Sales City Road, and Antioch Road also lie in the area. The town's water sources are Lost Creek, and Rigsby Lake.
