= Hinsonton, Georgia =

- Unincorporated community
- Location within Georgia Location within the United States
- Coordinates: 31°10′47″N 84°01′43″W
- Country: United States
- State: Georgia
- County: Mitchell
- Elevation: 338 ft (103 m)
- Time zone: UTC-5 (Eastern (EST))
  - Summer (DST): UTC-4 (EDT)
- Area code: 229

Hinsonton is an unincorporated community located in Mitchell County, Georgia, United States.

== Geography ==
Hinsonton's latitude is at 31.18 and its longitude is at -84.029. Its elevation rests at 338 feet (103 m). Hinsonton appears on the Cotton U.S. Geological Survey Map.

== Churches ==
Hinsonton Baptist Church rests in the area.
