= Rogerville, Georgia =

- Unincorporated community
- Location within Georgia Location within the United States
- Coordinates: 31°09′38″N 84°06′41″W
- Country: United States
- State: Georgia
- County: Mitchell
- Time zone: UTC-5 (Eastern (EST))
  - Summer (DST): UTC-4 (EDT)
- Area code: 229

Rogerville is an unincorporated community located in Mitchell County, Georgia, United States.

== Geography ==
Rogerville is settled at the intersection of Radiator Road and John Collins Road. Millpond Road, Store Road, Tomato Road, Smith Road, Drew C. White Road, and Nicks Road run through the area.
