= Walton Street–Church Street Historic District =

Historic district in Georgia, United States

- U.S. National Register of Historic Places
- U.S. Historic district
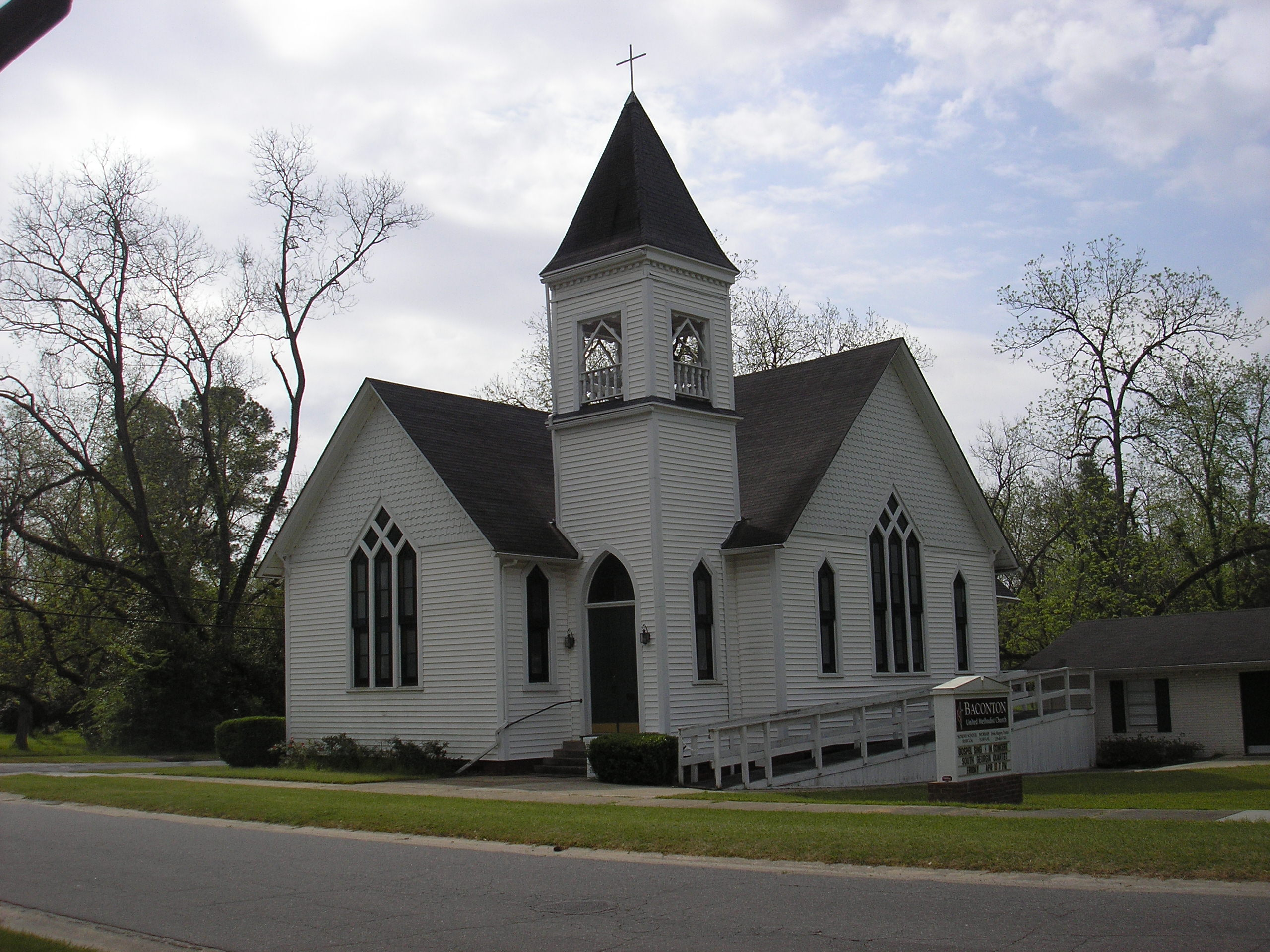

- Location within Georgia Location within the United States
- Location: Walton and Church Sts., Baconton, Georgia
- Coordinates: 31.374722°N 84.156667°W
- Area: 66 acres (27 ha)
- Built: 1900
- Built by: Glausier, Thomas Jefferson
- Architectural style: Late 19th and 20th Century Revivals, Late Victorian
- MPS: Baconton MRA
- NRHP reference No.: 83003602
- Added to NRHP: December 1, 1983

The Walton Street–Church Street Historic District in Baconton, Georgia is a 66-acre (27 ha) historic district that was listed on the National Register of Historic Places in 1983. The listing included 17 contributing buildings.

It includes 15 houses constructed between 1900 and the 1930s, in styles including late Victorian Eclectic, Neo-classical, and Georgian styles, plus some influence of the Prairie School and the Craftsman movements. Most are wood-frame buildings; some have brick veneer. Thomas Jefferson Glausier, a builder, may be associated with some of the buildings.

It includes a turn-of-the-20th-century historic Methodist church, prominent on the corner of Walton Street and Church Street, and a brick school.

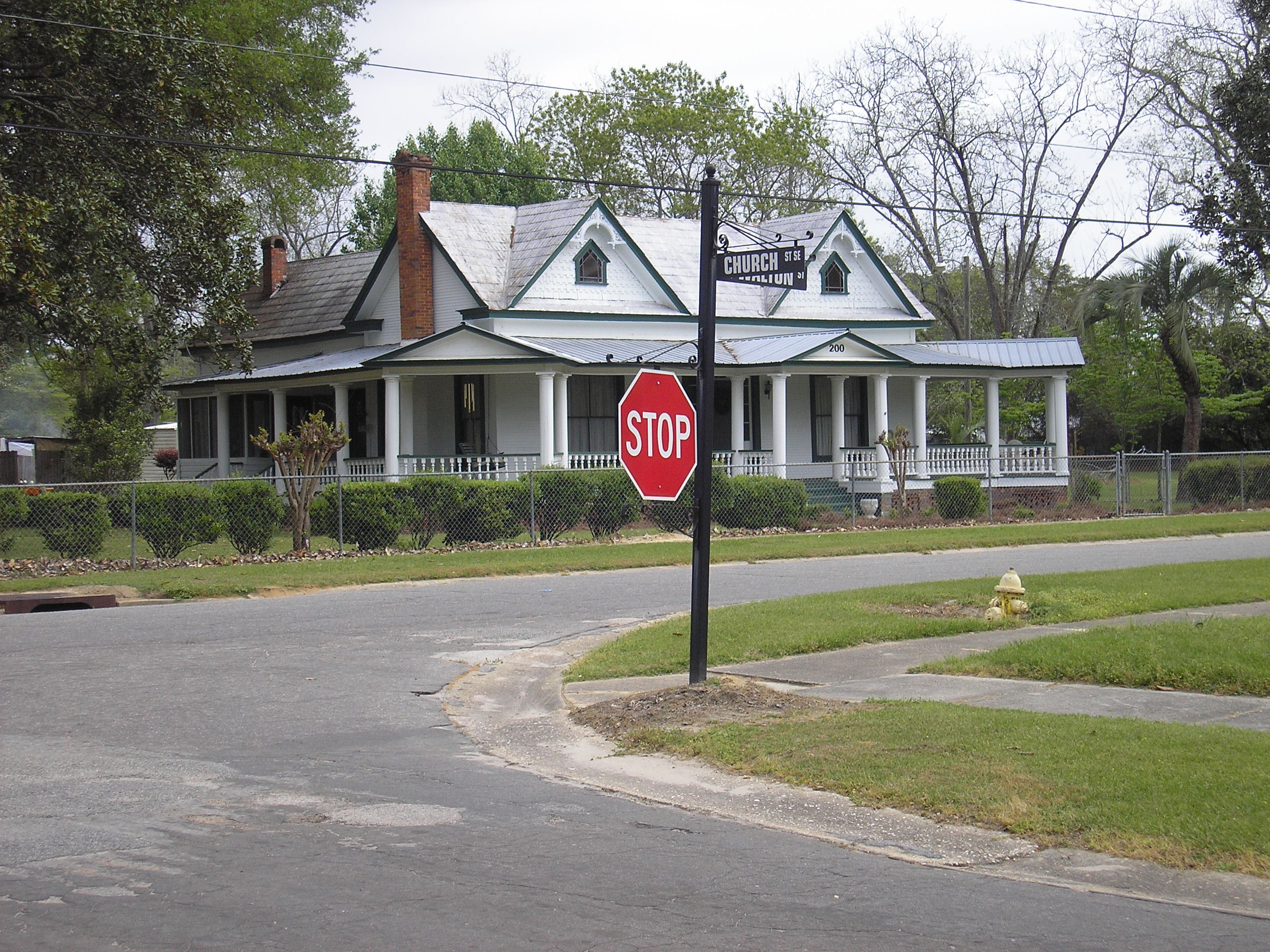
House at 200 Walton

The east side of Baconton was developed on land formerly owned by George W. Jackson. The George W. Jackson House stands at the former end of Walton Street, outside the district, and is separately listed on the National Register.

The district was one of three in Baconton listed on the National Register at the same time as the Jackson house, as part of a review of all historic resources in Baconton.
