= Laney, Georgia =

- Unincorporated community
- Location within Georgia Location within the United States
- Coordinates: 31°12′31″N 84°01′36″W
- Country: United States
- State: Georgia
- County: Mitchell
- Elevation: 351 ft (107 m)
- Time zone: UTC-5 (Eastern (EST))
  - Summer (DST): UTC-4 (EDT)
- ZIP code: 31784
- Area code: 229

Laney is an unincorporated community located in Mitchell County, Georgia, United States.

== Geography ==
Laney's latitude is at 31.209 and its longitude is at -84.027. Its elevation rests at 351 feet. Laney appears on the Cotton U.S. Geological Survey Map. It is located at the intersection of Lake Pleasant Church Rad and Laney Road. Georgia Highway 93, Baker Road, Mount Zion Road, and West County Line Road also lie in the area. A small creek runs through the town.
