= Mitchell County School District =

School district in Georgia (U.S. state)

Mitchell County School System

Address
- 108 South Harney Street Camilla, Georgia, 31730-2065; United States
- Coordinates: 31.227164°N 84.208740°W

District information
- Grades: Pre-school - 12
- Superintendent: Veronica Brown
- Accreditations: Southern Association of Colleges and Schools; Georgia Accrediting Commission

Students and staff
- Enrollment: 2,855
- Faculty: 273

Other information
- Telephone: (229) 321-7002
- Website: www.mitchell.k12.ga.us

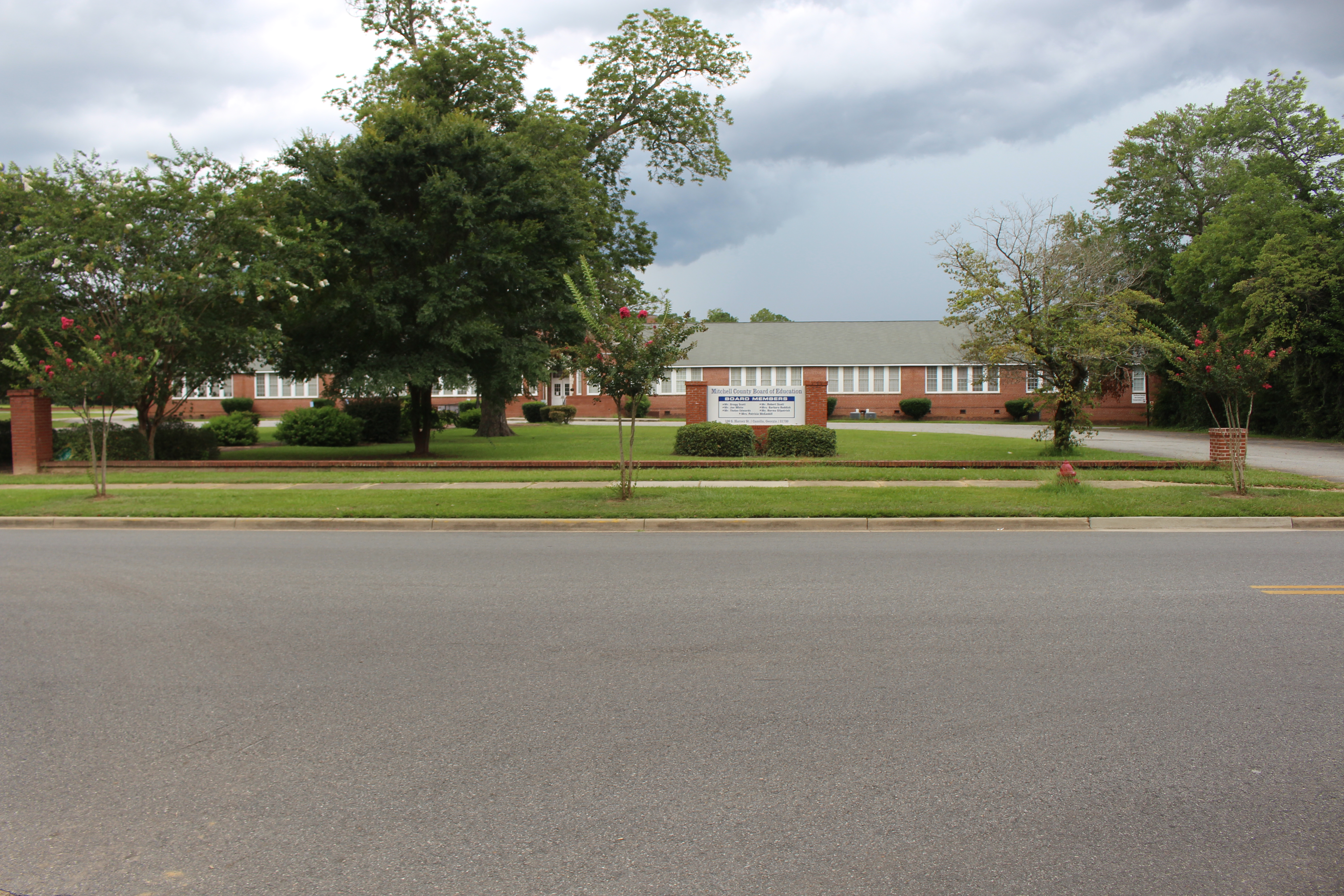
District headquarters

The Mitchell County School District is a public school district in Mitchell County, Georgia, United States, based in Camilla. It serves the communities of Baconton, Camilla, and Sale City, as well as the Mitchell County portion of Meigs.

Its boundary includes all of Mitchell County except for areas in Pelham.

== Schools ==
The Mitchell County School System has one primary school, one elementary school, one middle school, and one high school.

Schools:

- Mitchell County Primary School
- Mitchell County Elementary School
- Mitchell County Middle School
- Mitchell County High School
