= Petty, Georgia =

- Unincorporated community
- Location within Georgia Location within the United States
- Coordinates: 31°15′37″N 84°09′22″W
- Country: United States
- State: Georgia
- County: Mitchell
- Time zone: UTC-5 (Eastern (EST))
  - Summer (DST): UTC-4 (EDT)
- Area code: 229

Petty is an unincorporated community located in Mitchell County, Georgia, United States.

== Geography ==
Petty's latitude is at 31.178517 and its longitude is at -84.1679591. Petty lies at the end of Ironweed Road. Mayhaw Lane, Midway Road, Back 9 Road, Old Georgia Highway/Route 3, Hog Haw Road, Mount Zion Church Road, Microwave Road, and US Route 19 run through the area. Howell Lake is the area's primary water source.

== Churches ==
Pleasant View Missionary Baptist Church is the area's church.

== Demographics ==
As of 2011 Petty is a small farming community.

== Civil ==
Petty sports many abandoned houses (one being on Mayhaw Lane). It also has a plant that employs many of the town's residents. Fritz Horse Farm is one of the town's farms. The town was settled on a railroad crossing which rests at the end of Ironweed Road.

== Cemeteries ==
Pinecrest Memory Gardens is the town's cemetery.
