= Baconton Commercial Historic District =

Historic district in Georgia, United States

- U.S. National Register of Historic Places
- U.S. Historic district
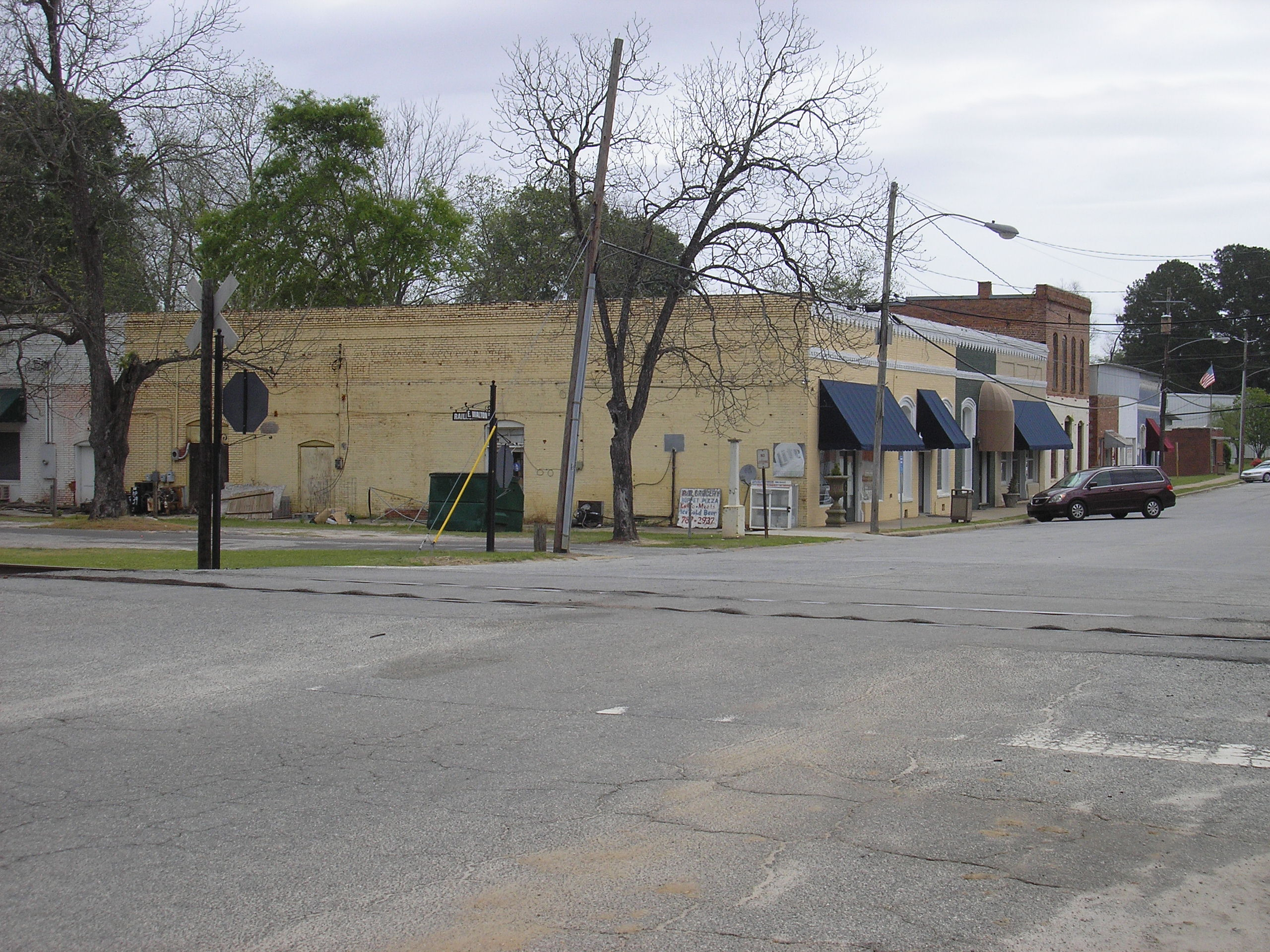

- Location within Georgia Location within the United States
- Location: E. Walton and E. Durham Sts., N. Railroad and S. Railroad Aves., and GA 3, Baconton
- Coordinates: 31.375°N 84.161667°W
- Area: 10 acres (4.0 ha)
- Built: 1900
- Built by: Glausier, Thomas Jefferson
- MPS: Baconton MRA
- NRHP reference No.: 83003603
- Added to NRHP: December 1, 1983

The Baconton Commercial Historic District is a 10-acre (4.0 ha) historic district in Baconton, Georgia that was listed on the National Register of Historic Places in 1983.

It then included 12 contributing buildings, which are mostly one-story brick commercial or warehouse buildings. The district also includes the Winchester Hotel, on E. Durham Street, which was built in the 1890s, enlarged after 1900, and operated into the 1930s. In 1983 it was a single family residence. Adjacent is the former home of the bookkeeper of the Jackson Supply Company.

Major Robert J. Bacon, Sr., was the original landowner of the area.

The district was one of three in Baconton listed on the National Register at the same time, as part of a review of all historic resources in Baconton, along with the George W. Jackson House.
