= Adelaide, Georgia =

- Unincorporated community
- Location within Georgia Location within the United States
- Coordinates: 31°16′01″N 84°08′55″W
- Country: United States
- State: Georgia
- County: Mitchell
- Elevation: 200 ft (61 m)
- Time zone: UTC-5 (Eastern (EST))
  - Summer (DST): UTC-4 (EDT)
- ZIP code: 31730 (Camilla)
- Area code: 229

Adelaide is an unincorporated community located near Camilla, Georgia, United States. Camilla is located in Mitchell County.

The community once had a post office. The elevation is 200 feet (61 m).
