= List of Florida area codes =

The U.S. state of Florida is serviced with 23 telephone area codes in the North American Numbering Plan (NANP).

- 239: Southwest coast: all of Lee County, Collier County, mainland Monroe County excluding Florida Keys; includes Cape Coral, Fort Myers, Naples, Everglades City
- 305: Overlay with 645 and 786 for Miami-Dade County and the Florida Keys
- 321: Partial overlay with 407 and 689 for Orlando, Cocoa Beach, St. Cloud and central eastern Florida. Also: Exclusive code for Space Coast: Cape Canaveral, Melbourne, Titusville, Cocoa Beach
- 324: Overlay with 904 for Jacksonville, Jacksonville Beach, Fernandina Beach, Orange Park and surrounding communities.
- 352: Dunnellon, Gainesville, Inverness, Lady Lake, Ocala, Spring Hill, The Villages, Wildwood and central Florida
- 386: Daytona Beach, Lake City, Live Oak, Crescent City and northern and eastern Florida
- 407: Overlay with 689 and most of 321 for Orlando, Cocoa Beach, Kissimmee, St. Cloud and central eastern Florida
- 448: Overlay with 850 for Pensacola, Tallahassee, Panama City and the Florida panhandle
- 561: Overlay with 728 for all of Palm Beach County: West Palm Beach, Boca Raton, Boynton Beach, Delray Beach, Belle Glade.
- 645: Overlay complex with 305 and 786 for Miami-Dade County and the Florida Keys
- 656: Overlay with 813 for all of Hillsborough County, including Tampa, Plant City; inland areas of Pasco County, and parts of Oldsmar in Pinellas County
- 689: Overlay with 407 and part of 321 for Orlando, Cocoa Beach, Kissimmee, St. Cloud and central eastern Florida
- 727: Majority of Pinellas County including Clearwater, St. Petersburg, excluding parts of Oldsmar; coastal third of Pasco County
- 728: Overlay with 561 for all of Palm Beach County: West Palm Beach, Boca Raton, Boynton Beach, Delray Beach, Belle Glade.
- 754: Overlay with 954 for all of Broward County: Fort Lauderdale, Hollywood, Coral Springs
- 772: Vero Beach, Port Saint Lucie, Fort Pierce, Sebastian, Stuart and central eastern Florida
- 786: Overlay with 305 and 645 for Miami-Dade County and the Florida Keys
- 813: Overlay with 656 for all of Hillsborough County, including Tampa, Plant City; inland areas of Pasco County, and parts of Oldsmar in Pinellas County, overlays with 656
- 850: Overlay with 448 for Pensacola, Navarre, Tallahassee, Panama City and the Florida panhandle
- 863: Lakeland, Arcadia, Avon Park, Clewiston, Bartow, Sebring, Winter Haven, Poinciana and south central Florida
- 904: Overlay with 324 for Jacksonville, St. Augustine, Starke, Green Cove Springs and northeastern Florida
- 941: Gulf Coast immediately south of Tampa Bay: all of Manatee County. Sarasota County, and Charlotte County; includes Bradenton, Port Charlotte, Sarasota, Punta Gorda
- 954: Overlay with 754 for all of Broward County: Fort Lauderdale, Hollywood, Coral Springs

When the original North American area codes were introduced for a nationwide telephone numbering plan in 1947, the entire state was a single numbering plan area (NPA) with area code 305. In 1953, area code 813 was introduced for the western coast of Florida, and 904 was assigned for northern Florida in 1965. In 1988, area code 407 was introduced for the Orlando area. In 1995, area code 954 was introduced for Broward County. In 1996, area code 239 was introduced for southwest Florida and area code 352 for the areas around Gainesville and Ocala. Many new area codes were introduced in the first two decades of the 21st century, as a result of city expansion and the growth of telecommunication services.
