= Meigs, Georgia =

- City
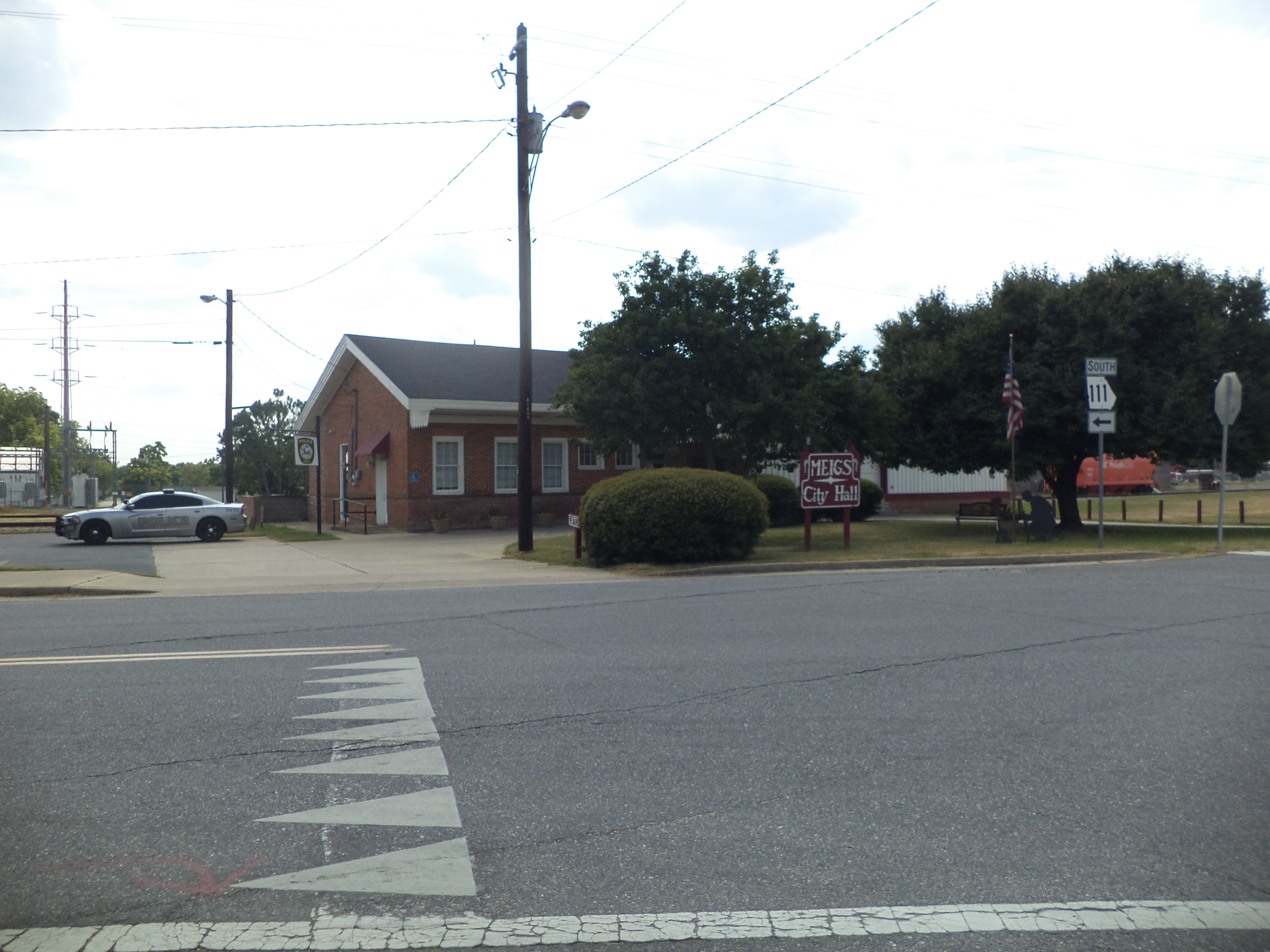
- Meigs City Hall and police station

- Location in Thomas County and the state of Georgia
- Coordinates: 31°4′22″N 84°5′28″W
- Country: United States
- State: Georgia
- Counties: Thomas, Mitchell

Area
  - Total: 1.60 sq mi (4.14 km^{2})
  - Land: 1.56 sq mi (4.03 km^{2})
  - Water: 0.042 sq mi (0.11 km^{2})
- Elevation: 341 ft (104 m)

Population (2020)
  - Total: 928
  - Density: 596/sq mi (230.3/km^{2})
- Time zone: UTC-5 (Eastern (EST))
  - Summer (DST): UTC-4 (EDT)
- ZIP code: 31765
- Area code: 229
- FIPS code: 13-50680
- GNIS feature ID: 0318004
- Website: https://www.cityofmeigs.gov/

Meigs is a city in Thomas County, Georgia, United States, with a small portion extending north into Mitchell County. The population was 928 at the 2020 census, down from 1,035 in 2010.

== History ==
The Georgia General Assembly incorporated Meigs as a town in 1889. The city is named after William Allen Meigs (1862–1913), a successful turpentine dealer for the town.

== Geography ==
Meigs is located in northwestern Thomas County at 31°4′22″N 84°5′28″W (31.072664, -84.090988). A small portion of Mitchell County within 4,000 feet (1,200 m) of the center of town is also within the city limits.

According to the United States Census Bureau, the city has a total area of 1.6 square miles (4.1 km^{2}), of which 1.6 square miles (4.1 km^{2}) are land and 0.04 square miles (0.10 km^{2}), or 2.75%, are water.

U.S. Route 19 passes just east of the city limits, leading southeast 19 miles (31 km) to Thomasville, the Thomas county seat, and northwest 5 miles (8 km) to Pelham. Georgia State Route 111 passes through the center of Meigs on Marshall Street and Depot Street; it leads northeast 20 miles (32 km) to Moultrie and southwest 16 miles (26 km) to Cairo.

== Demographics ==
Historical population
Census	Pop.	Note	%±
1900	617		—
1910	697		13.0%
1920	1,011		45.1%
1930	1,000		−1.1%
1940	927		−7.3%
1950	1,125		21.4%
1960	1,236		9.9%
1970	1,226		−0.8%
1980	1,231		0.4%
1990	1,120		−9.0%
2000	1,090		−2.7%
2010	1,035		−5.0%
2020	928		−10.3%
U.S. Decennial Census; 1850-1870 1870-1880; 1890-1910 1920-1930; 1940 1950 1960; 1970 1980 1990; 2000 2010

Meigs racial composition as of 2020
Race	Num.	Perc.
White (non-Hispanic)	255	27.48%
Black or African American (non-Hispanic)	576	62.07%
Asian	3	0.32%
Other/Mixed	19	2.05%
Hispanic or Latino	76	8.08%

As of the 2020 United States census, there were 928 people, 394 households, and 235 families residing in the city.

Circa 2024 the population was 1,035. The population by county breakdown was as follows: 993 in Thomas County and 42 in Mitchell County.

== Education ==
Residents in Thomas County are in the Thomas County School District.

Residents in Mitchell County are in the Mitchell County School District.
