= Branchville, Georgia =

- Unincorporated community
- Location within Georgia Location within the United States
- Coordinates: 31°09′02″N 84°18′56″W
- Country: United States
- State: Georgia
- County: Mitchell

Area
  - Total: 98.5 sq mi (255 km^{2})
- Elevation: 140 ft (43 m)

Population (2007)
  - Total: 1,090
  - Density: 11/sq mi (4.2/km^{2})
- Time zone: UTC-5 (Eastern (EST))
  - Summer (DST): UTC-4 (EDT)
- Area code: 229

Branchville is an unincorporated community located in Mitchell County, Georgia, United States.

== History ==
A variant name was "Faircloth". The present name is after Colonel W. Branch, a pioneer citizen.
