= Lester, Georgia =

- Unincorporated community
- Location within Georgia Location within the United States
- Coordinates: 31°22′11″N 84°02′42″W
- Country: United States
- State: Georgia
- County: Mitchell
- Time zone: UTC-5 (Eastern (EST))
  - Summer (DST): UTC-4 (EDT)
- Area code: 229

Lester is an unincorporated community located in Mitchell County, Georgia, United States.

== Geography ==
Lester sits at the intersection of Georgia Highway 112 and Georgia Highway 93. Cut Road, Gravel Hill Road, Morey Hill Road, Teal Road, Frazier Road, Blackwell Lane, and Breast Station Road also rest in the area.
