= Sale City, Georgia =

- Town
- Interactive map of Sale City, Georgia
- Coordinates: 31°15′47″N 84°1′20″W
- Country: United States
- State: Georgia
- County: Mitchell

Area
  - Total: 1.83 sq mi (4.75 km^{2})
  - Land: 1.83 sq mi (4.75 km^{2})
  - Water: 0 sq mi (0.00 km^{2})
- Elevation: 358 ft (109 m)

Population (2020)
  - Total: 354
  - Density: 193.1/sq mi (74.54/km^{2})
- Time zone: UTC-5 (Eastern (EST))
  - Summer (DST): UTC-4 (EDT)
- ZIP code: 31784
- Area code: 229
- FIPS code: 13-68096
- GNIS feature ID: 0322327
- Website: https://salecityga.com/

Sale City is a town in Mitchell County, Georgia, United States. The population was 354 at the 2020 census.

== History ==
A post office called Sale City was established in 1904. The community was named after founder T.D. Sale. The Georgia General Assembly incorporated Sale City as a town in 1910.

== Geography ==
Sale City is located in eastern Mitchell County at 31°15′47″N 84°1′20″W (31.262970, -84.022182). Georgia State Route 93 passes through the town center, leading southwest 14 miles (23 km) to Pelham and northwest 15 miles (24 km) to Baconton. State Route 270 leads northeast 8 miles (13 km) to Doerun, while Camilla, the Mitchell County seat, is 12 miles (19 km) to the west.

According to the United States Census Bureau, Sale City has a total area of 1.8 square miles (4.7 km^{2}), of which 0.002 square miles (1.3 acres), or 0.10%, are water.

== Demographics ==
Historical population
Census	Pop.	Note	%±
1910	402		—
1920	537		33.6%
1930	506		−5.8%
1940	329		−35.0%
1950	289		−12.2%
1960	275		−4.8%
1970	323		17.5%
1980	336		4.0%
1990	324		−3.6%
2000	319		−1.5%
2010	380		19.1%
2020	354		−6.8%
U.S. Decennial Census; 1850-1870 1870-1880; 1890-1910 1920-1930; 1940 1950 1960; 1970 1980 1990; 2000 2010

Sale City racial composition as of 2020
Race	Num.	Perc.
White (non-Hispanic)	235	66.38%
Black or African American (non-Hispanic)	78	22.03%
Other/Mixed	7	1.98%
Hispanic or Latino	34	9.6%

As of the 2020 United States census, there were 354 people, 173 households, and 124 families residing in the city.
