= Pelham City School District =

School district in Georgia (U.S. state)

Address
- 188 W Railroad Street South Pelham, Georgia, 31779-1608; United States
- Coordinates: 31.119414°N 84.151335°W

District information
- Grades: Pre-school - 12
- Superintendent: Floyd Fort
- Accreditation(s): Southern Association of Colleges and Schools; Georgia Accrediting Commission

Students and staff
- Enrollment: 1,627
- Faculty: 101

Other information
- Telephone: (229) 294-8715
- Fax: (229) 294-2760
- Website: www.pelham-city.k12.ga.us

The Pelham City School District is a public school district in Mitchell County, Georgia, based in Pelham. It serves the city of Pelham, with the district boundary being that of the city.

== Schools ==
The Pelham City School District has one elementary school, one middle school, and one high school.

Schools:

- Pelham Elementary School
- Pelham City Middle School
- Pelham High School
