= Cotton, Georgia =

- Unincorporated community
- Location within Georgia Location within the United States
- Coordinates: 31°09′42″N 84°04′01″W
- Country: United States
- State: Georgia
- County: Mitchell
- Elevation: 325 ft (99 m)
- Time zone: UTC-5 (Eastern (EST))
  - Summer (DST): UTC-4 (EDT)
- ZIP code: 31765
- Area code: 229

Cotton is an unincorporated community located in Mitchell County, United States.

== History ==
Cotton was originally called "Mapleton", and under the latter name was founded in 1899. The Georgia General Assembly incorporated the place in 1913 as the "Town of Cotton", with municipal corporate limits extending in a one-half mile radius from the central railroad depot. The present name is after the local cotton growing industry. Cotton's town charter was dissolved in 1995.

== Geography ==
Cotton's latitude is at 31.162 and its longitude is at -84.067. Its elevation rests at 325 feet (99 m). Cotton appears on the Cotton South U.S. Geological Survey Map.
