= Pelham High School (Georgia) =

Location
- 720 Barrow Avenue; Pelham, Georgia 31779; United States
- Coordinates: 31°6′47″N 84°9′53″W

Information
- Teaching staff: 36.00 (FTE)
- Enrollment: 395 (2023–2024)
- Student to teacher ratio: 10.97
- Colors: Blue, gold and white
- Nickname: Hornets

Pelham High School is a public high school located in Pelham, Georgia, United States. The school serves grades 9–12 in the Pelham City School District.

Its boundary is that of the City of Pelham.

The school colors are navy blue, white, and gold. The school mascot is the Hornet.

== Athletics ==
- Baseball
- Softball (girls')
- Basketball (boys' and girls')

The Lady Hornets basketball team has won four state championships.

- Cross country
- Football
- Golf
- Tennis
- Track and field

The PHS track team won the 2010 Class A Boys' State Championship.

- Wrestling
- Cheerleading
