= Area codes 850 and 448 =

Area codes in Florida, United States

Area codes 850 and 448 are telephone area codes in the North American Numbering Plan for the Florida panhandle, including Pensacola, Tallahassee and Panama City. Area code 850 was created in 1997 in a split of 904 and area code 448 was assigned as a second code to the same area in an overlay plan in 2019.

== History ==
When the American Telephone and Telegraph Company (AT&T) designed the initial version of the first nationwide telephone numbering plan for Operator Toll Dialing, the predecessor of the North American Numbering Plan (NANP), in 1947, the entire state of Florida was designated a single numbering plan area (NPA), and assigned the area code 305. In 1953, the western part of the peninsula from the Tampa Bay area southward received area code 813, and in 1965, North Florida from the panhandle to Jacksonville was assigned area code 904 to mitigate the demand for telephone service for the state's growth in population. For 30 years, North Florida remained a single NPA until 1995, when the southern part of the region was split off with area code 352. Continued demand put new pressure on the numbering resources, and within a year, further relief action was in the planning stage. The result was that the far western part of the panhandle (south of the Alabama state line) became a new numbering plan area with area code 850. Permissive dialing in the numbering plan area began June 23, 1997, and mandatory dialing commenced on March 23, 1998.

=== Original plan ===
Area code 850 was originally intended to be the relief code used in the 1995 split of the 904 area code. The Jacksonville, Tallahassee, Panama City and Pensacola LATAs, and the Florida portion of the Mobile, Alabama, LATA were to retain 904 while the Daytona Beach and Gainesville LATAs changed to 850. This plan was abandoned in favor of a plan that moved only the Gainesville LATA to a new area code, this time 352 (FLA on the telephone keypad) and kept the Daytona Beach LATA in then-904 along with the rest of northern Florida. The reason for changing from 850 to 352 was a potential dialing conflict with the 407-850 exchange and some rate centers in the Gainesville LATA with 7-digit local dialing into the 407 area code. Political pressure from the tourism industry in Daytona Beach resulted in that area being kept in the then-904 area code.

The Florida Public Service Commission had planned a three-way split of 904 to take place in 1997. The Jacksonville LATA was proposed to receive area code 234 while the Daytona Beach LATA would change to area code 386. The panhandle would have retained 904. Outcry from the public and business community in the Jacksonville region was significant since Jacksonville is the largest urban area in northern Florida, and would thus face a greater expense and burden to change phone numbers, reprogram cell phones and update printed materials than other parts of the area code. When an area code is split, normal practice calls for the old area code to be retained by the largest city in the former area code territory in order to minimize disruption. There was also opposition from NANPA and the Federal Communications Commission. These two agencies objected because the split would have been unbalanced by creating a new code just for Daytona Beach. The Florida PSC changed course and adopted the plan that was ultimately implemented with the panhandle, including Tallahassee, moving to 850 and Jacksonville and Daytona Beach retaining 904. Area code 234 has since been placed into service in Ohio as an overlay with area code 330.

=== Relief planning for an overlay ===
Area code 850 exhausted its available supply of central office codes in May 2021. Based on previous exhaust forecasts, the Florida Public Service Commission began relief planning to provide additional numbering capacity for NPA 850. In an initial planning meeting on May 16, 2019, industry members recommended an all-services overlay as the preferred relief method. NANPA subsequently filed a request with the Florida Public Service Commission to approve a new area code overlaying 850. The Florida Public Service Commission approved the industry's all-services overlay recommendation on November 5, 2019. The new area code, 448, was officially assigned to overlay 850. Ten-digit dialing became mandatory on May 22, 2021. The in-service date, when first central office code assignment can become effective, is June 22, 2021. The first central office code assignment within the 448 area code occurred on May 14, 2021.

== Service area ==
The numbering plan area comprises the following cities:

- Altha
- Apalachicola
- Aucilla
- Bascom
- Bonifay
- Blountstown
- Bradfordville
- Bristol
- Callaway
- Campbellton
- Capitola
- Carrabelle
- Cantonment
- Century
- Chaires
- Chattahoochee
- Chipley
- Cinco Bayou
- Cottondale
- Crawfordville
- Crestview
- DeFuniak Springs
- Destin
- Eastpoint
- Ensley
- Esto
- Fort Braden
- Fort Walton Beach
- Freeport
- Graceville
- Grand Ridge
- Greenville
- Gretna
- Gulf Breeze
- Havana
- Jacob City
- Jay
- Keaton Beach
- Laguna Beach
- Lamont
- Laurel Hill
- Lloyd
- Lynn Haven
- Madison
- Malone
- Marianna
- Mary Esther
- Mexico Beach
- Miccosukee
- Milton
- Miramar Beach
- Monticello
- Mossy Head
- Navarre
- Newport
- Niceville
- Noma
- Pace
- Panacea
- Panama City
- Panama City Beach
- Paxton
- Pensacola
- Perry
- Ponce de Leon
- Port Saint Joe
- Quincy
- Rosemary Beach
- Santa Rosa Beach
- Shalimar
- Shell Point
- Sneads
- Sopchoppy
- Southport
- Springfield
- St. George Island
- St. Marks
- Tallahassee (state capital)
- Valparaiso
- Vernon
- Waukeenah
- Wausau
- Westville
- Wewahitchka
- Woodville

== See also ==
- List of Florida area codes
- List of North American Numbering Plan area codes

Florida area codes: 239, 305/786/645, 321, 352, 386, 407/689, 561/728, 727, 772, 813/656, 850/448, 863, 904/324, 941, 954/754
	North: 229, 251, 334	
West: 251	area code 850	East: 352, 386
	South: Gulf of Mexico	
Alabama area codes: 205/659, 251, 256/938, 334
Georgia area codes: 229, 404, 478, 678/470/943, 706/762, 770, 912
