= Area codes 904 and 324 =

Telephone area code for northeast Florida, United States

Area codes 904 and 324 are telephone area codes in the North American Numbering Plan for most of the First Coast (northeast) region of the U.S. state of Florida. The numbering plan area comprises most of the metropolitan area of Jacksonville. It includes all of Duval County, St. Johns County, Nassau County, and almost all of Baker County and Clay County. Area code 904 was created in an area code split of area code 305 in 1965. In 2024, the numbering plan received a second area code, 324 , through the creation of an overlay complex to mitigate central office code exhaustion and provide additional telephone numbers in the area.

== History ==
In 1947, the American Telephone and Telegraph Company (AT&T) designated the entire state of Florida as a single numbering plan area, and assigned area code 305 as a destination routing code for Operator Toll Dialing. The southwest portion was split off in 1953 with area code 813. The northern half of Florida, including Jacksonville, was assigned area code 904 in 1965.

This configuration persisted through 1988, when the east coast of Florida from Palm Beach County north through Brevard County, as well as the Orlando metropolitan area was assigned area code 407.

In 1995, central Florida surrounding Ocala and Gainesville was removed from 904 by the creation of area code 352. Later in 1995, the Florida Public Service Commission planned a three-way split to relieve the overcrowded 904 area code. In this plan, the Jacksonville area would be reassigned to the proposed area code 234, while the Daytona Beach LATA would be assigned area code 386. The Pensacola, Panama City, and Tallahassee areas would have kept area code 904. Area codes 234 was eventually assigned to an overlay complex in Akron, Ohio.

Complaints from the public and businesses in the Jacksonville region, as well as opposition from NANPA and the Federal Communications Commission, compelled the Florida PSC to adopt a different plan. The panhandle was assigned to area code 850, with Jacksonville, Daytona Beach, and the surrounding areas keeping area code 904.

With the proliferation of cellular telephones, facsimile machines, pocket pagers, and other telephone devices, area code 904 was projected for exhaustion of central office prefixes within four years. Rapid population growth around Jacksonville, Daytona Beach, and the rural areas between Tallahassee and Jacksonville required separate area codes for each. During planning for this division, it was determined that the northwestern portion of the old 904 territory was growing too quickly to stay in 904, even though it was not growing as fast as were the areas closer to Jacksonville. Although this northwestern portion of 904 was not nearly large enough for its own area code, the two nearest area codes, 850 and 352, were growing too quickly to absorb this portion of 904.

This left only three viable solutions: split the Jacksonville metropolitan area into two numbering plan areas, overlay 904 with a second code, mandating ten-digit dialing which was a new concept at the time, or create two noncontiguous sections of a new numbering plan area. The Florida Public Service Commission, which oversees telecommunication in Florida, opted for the latter solution, and these two noncontiguous sections received area code 386 in July 2001.

Since 904 was projected to exhaust in 2024, a new area code, 324, was approved to serve the same geographic area of area code 904, since February 26, 2024, requiring ten-digit dialing. Permissive dialing began in August 2023. An alternative option that was considered was a boundary elimination overlay with 386 (erasing the 2001 split and its non-contiguous area) but that would result in a relatively short period of relief.

== See also ==
- List of Florida area codes
- List of North American Numbering Plan area codes

Florida area codes: 239, 305/786/645, 321, 352, 386, 407/689, 561/728, 727, 772, 813/656, 850/448, 863, 904/324, 941, 954/754
	North: 912	
West: 386	904/324	East: Atlantic Ocean
	South: 386, 352	
Georgia area codes: 229, 404, 478, 678/470/943, 706/762, 770, 912
