= Area code 386 =

Area code for areas of northern and northeastern Florida

Area code 386 is a telephone area code in the North American Numbering Plan in the U.S. state of Florida. The numbering plan area comprises the counties of Columbia, Flagler, Hamilton, Lafayette, Suwannee, Union, the vast majority of Volusia County (with the exception of the unincorporated area of Osteen), and smaller portions of Alachua County and Putnam County. The Deltona–Daytona Beach–Ormond Beach metropolitan area is the most populous metro area in 386. The area code was created in an area code split of 904 in 2001.

== Service area ==
Numbering plan area 386 is one of the few in North America that is not geographically contiguous on land. The eastern section comprises most of Volusia County, with the exception of the southwest (the unincorporated town of Osteen), all of Flagler County, the northernmost portion of Alachua County, and far eastern Putnam County. The western section covers all of Columbia, Hamilton, Lafayette, Suwannee, and Union counties. Daytona Beach and its suburbs are by far the most populous cities in 386.

== History ==
When the American Telephone and Telegraph Company created the area code system for a nationwide telephone numbering plan in 1947, the entire state was a single numbering plan area (NPA), and received area code 305. In 1953, the southwestern part of the state became area code 813, while 305 continued to serve the rest of the state. In 1965, everything north of Orlando and the Space Coast was given area code 904. There remained three area codes in Florida until the mid-1980s, when Florida's explosive growth forced further divisions. However, north Florida is not as densely populated as the rest of the state. As a result, 904 remained the sole area code for north Florida for more than 30 years.

In 1997, the 904 numbering plan area was split three ways. Most of the Florida Panhandle, essentially, the area from Tallahassee westward, was split off with area code 850, Gainesville and the Nature Coast received area code 352, while Jacksonville and Daytona Beach retained the existing area code 904. Although this was intended as a long-term solution, the advent of cell phones, pagers, and other auxiliary devices put pressure on the 904 numbering resources within four years. Along with the rapid growth of both Jacksonville and Daytona Beach, suggested that the two cities would need to be in separate numbering plan areas.

Once service demand became too large to be served by one area code, the Daytona Beach/Halifax Area Chamber of Commerce discovered that area code 386 was unassigned. The digits spell out FUN on the alphanumeric telephone keypad, suitable to promote the Fun Coast area. Other government officials and residents were encouraged to lobby the Florida Public Service Commission, the body who oversees telecommunication development in Florida, to reserve this area code.

In relief planning, it was discovered that the northwestern portion of the 904 area code, comprising several exurban and rural areas west of Jacksonville, was too large to stay in 904, even though it was not growing as fast as the areas closer to Jacksonville. While this northwest portion of 904 was not nearly large enough for its own area code, the two area codes nearest to 904, 850 and 352, were growing too quickly to absorb this portion of 904.

This left only three viable solutions: split the Jacksonville metro area, overlay 904 with a second code, or make two non-contiguous sections of a new area code. The Florida Public Service Commission opted for the third solution, and these two non-contiguous sections became area code 386. There were some on the commission who saw the odd split in area code 386 as a temporary measure. However, under current projections, 386 will remain in its noncontiguous state beyond 2040. Despite the rapid growth of the Daytona Beach area, it is nowhere near exhaustion.

When area code 386 was formed, DeBary and Deltona, which had been in 407, were switched from 407 to 386. In the interim permissive dialing period for DeBary, it was reachable in area codes 407 and 386 but never in area code 904.

Area code 386 was activated for service on February 15, 2001.

== See also ==
- List of Florida area codes
- List of North American Numbering Plan area codes

Florida area codes: 239, 305/786/645, 321, 352, 386, 407/689, 561/728, 727, 772, 813/656, 850/448, 863, 904/324, 941, 954/754
	North: 229, 904/324, 912	
West: 352, 850/448	386	East: 904/324, Atlantic Ocean
	South: 321/407/689, 352	
Georgia area codes: 229, 404, 478, 678/470/943, 706/762, 770, 912
