= Area codes 954 and 754 =

Area codes for Broward County, Florida

Area codes 954 and 754 are the telephone area codes in the North American Numbering Plan (NANP) for Broward County, Florida. Notable cities in the numbering plan area are Fort Lauderdale, Plantation, Hollywood, Parkland, Sunrise, Pompano Beach, Coral Springs, Deerfield Beach, Davie, Weston, Dania Beach, Oakland Park and Pembroke Pines.

Area code 954 went into service on September 11, 1995, in a split of area code 305, which was the original and sole area code for Florida in 1947, when AT&T created the first nationwide telephone numbering plan. By 1995, Broward County had used 305 for 48 years, and numerous splits over the years had made area code 305 more or less coextensive with the Miami–Fort Lauderdale area. This split was intended as a long-term solution, but within five years 954 was already close to exhaustion due to South Florida's explosive growth and the proliferation of auxiliary devices, such as cell phones, pagers, and fax machines.

In November 2000, the Florida Public Service Commission approved the use of an overlay area code to service Broward County, after a telecommunications industry group sought alternatives to relieve the strain on the county. It was projected that 954 was to be exhausted by the third quarter of 2002. The North American Numbering Plan Administration (NANPA) announced on December 4, 2000, an area code overlay plan for relief, assigning area code 754 to the same territory in Broward County. The area code was activated on August 1, 2001 and began use on April 1, 2002. As the overlay plan required, ten-digit dialing became mandatory in Broward. As 954 exchanges are exhausted, new numbers use area code 754.

== See also ==
- List of Florida area codes
- List of NANP area codes

Florida area codes: 239, 305/786/645, 321, 352, 386, 407/689, 561/728, 727, 772, 813/656, 850/448, 863, 904/324, 941, 954/754
	North: 561/728	
West: 239, 863	754/954	East: 242 (The Bahamas), Atlantic Ocean
	South: 305/786/645	
Bahamas area codes: 242
