= Area codes 561 and 728 =

Telephone area codes in Palm Beach County, Florida

Area codes 561 and 728 are telephone area codes in the North American Numbering Plan (NANP) for Palm Beach County in the U.S. state of Florida. 561 was created on May 13, 1996, in a split of area code 407. The numbering plan area (NPA) comprises nearly every major city in the county, the largest of which being West Palm Beach, Boca Raton, Wellington, Boynton Beach, Jupiter, Delray Beach, and Belle Glade. On March 10, 2023, area code 728 was added to the same numbering plan area to form an all-services distributed overlay.

Within only five years of creation, NPA 561 was experiencing rapid exhaustion of central office codes from growth of service demands in the Palm Beaches/Treasure Coast region and the proliferation of cell phones. In mitigation, the northern part of 561, the Treasure Coast, was split off with area code 772 in 2002. This service configuration in the region was sufficient for twenty-one years until on January 4, 2022, the Florida Public Service Commission approved an all-services overlay for the NPA, with an effective in-service date of March 10, 2023.

A permissive dialing period was not necessary for this overlay, because area code 561 already had a ten-digit dialing requirement, because prior to October 2021, it had telephone numbers assigned for the central office code 988. In 2020, 988 was designated nationwide as a dialing code for the National Suicide Prevention Lifeline, which created a conflict for exchanges that permit seven-digit dialing. Calls with the numbering plan area therefore required ten-digit dialing by October 24, 2021.

== See also ==
- List of Florida area codes
- List of North American Numbering Plan area codes

Florida area codes: 239, 305/786/645, 321, 352, 386, 407/689, 561/728, 727, 772, 813/656, 850/448, 863, 904/324, 941, 954/754
	North: 772	
West: 863, 239	561/728	East: 242, Atlantic Ocean
	South: 754/954	
Bahamas area codes: 242
