= Area codes 305, 786, and 645 =

Area codes in southern Florida

Area codes 305, 786, and 645 are telephone area codes in the North American Numbering Plan (NANP) for Miami, Florida, Miami-Dade County, and the part of Monroe County in the Florida Keys in the United States. The mainland portion of Monroe County is served by area code 239.

== History ==
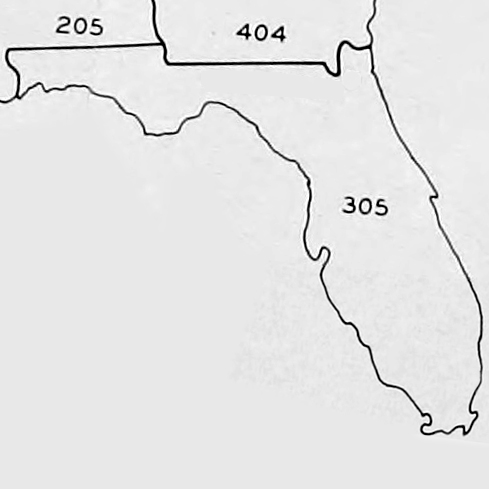
Original NANP area codes of Florida and surrounding states.

In 1947, the American Telephone and Telegraph Company (AT&T) announced the first nationwide telephone numbering plan and divided the United States and Canada into 86 numbering plan areas and assigned the original North American area codes, a unique code for each area, to speed the connection times for operator toll dialing.

The state of Florida was a single numbering plan area with area code 305. In 1953, with the development of direct distance dialing, the western part of the peninsula from the Tampa Bay area south, which was serviced mostly by General Telephone (GTE), was designated as a separate numbering plan area with area code 813.

As a result of the increase in the state's population, North Florida from the Panhandle to Jacksonville was assigned area code 904 with a permissive dialing period beginning July 6, 1965, and mandatory dialing beginning January 1, 1966.

On April 16, 1988, the east coast of Florida from Palm Beach County north through Brevard County, as well as the Orlando metropolitan area, was assigned area code 407.

On September 11, 1995, Broward County was split from 305 and assigned area code 954. It was predicted that the new area code would delay but not prevent phone numbers in the 305 area code from being completely used up in a few years.

Within two years, the reconfigured area code 305 was close to exhaustion due to growth in Dade County from the increasing popularity of cell phones and pagers. In mitigation, area code 786 was installed as an overlay on March 1, 1998. The overlay numbering plan area originally comprised only Miami-Dade County, although it was clear the remainder of area code 305 would eventually be overlaid with area code 786. Monroe County was added to area code 786 on September 1, 2001.

The Florida Public Service Commission approved a third area code for the Miami region on February 25, 2022. Area code 645 was activated on August 4, 2023, before the anticipated exhaust of central office codes in 305 and 786, which was likely to occur in 2023.

== In popular culture ==
- Recording artist Armando Pérez, better known as Pitbull, was born and raised in Miami, and has nicknamed himself "Mr. 305."
- Spanish singer Enrique Iglesias, who resides in Miami, formerly used "@enrique305" as his account name on Twitter.
- A web-based magazine in Miami is called 305 Magazine.

== See also ==
- List of Florida area codes
- List of North American Numbering Plan area codes

Florida area codes: 239, 305/786/645, 321, 352, 386, 407/689, 561/728, 727, 772, 813/656, 850/448, 863, 904/324, 941, 954/754
	North: 754/954	
West: 239	305/786/645	East: 242 (The Bahamas)
	South: Cuba	
Bahamas area codes: 242
