= George W. Jackson House =

Historic house in Georgia, United States

- U.S. National Register of Historic Places
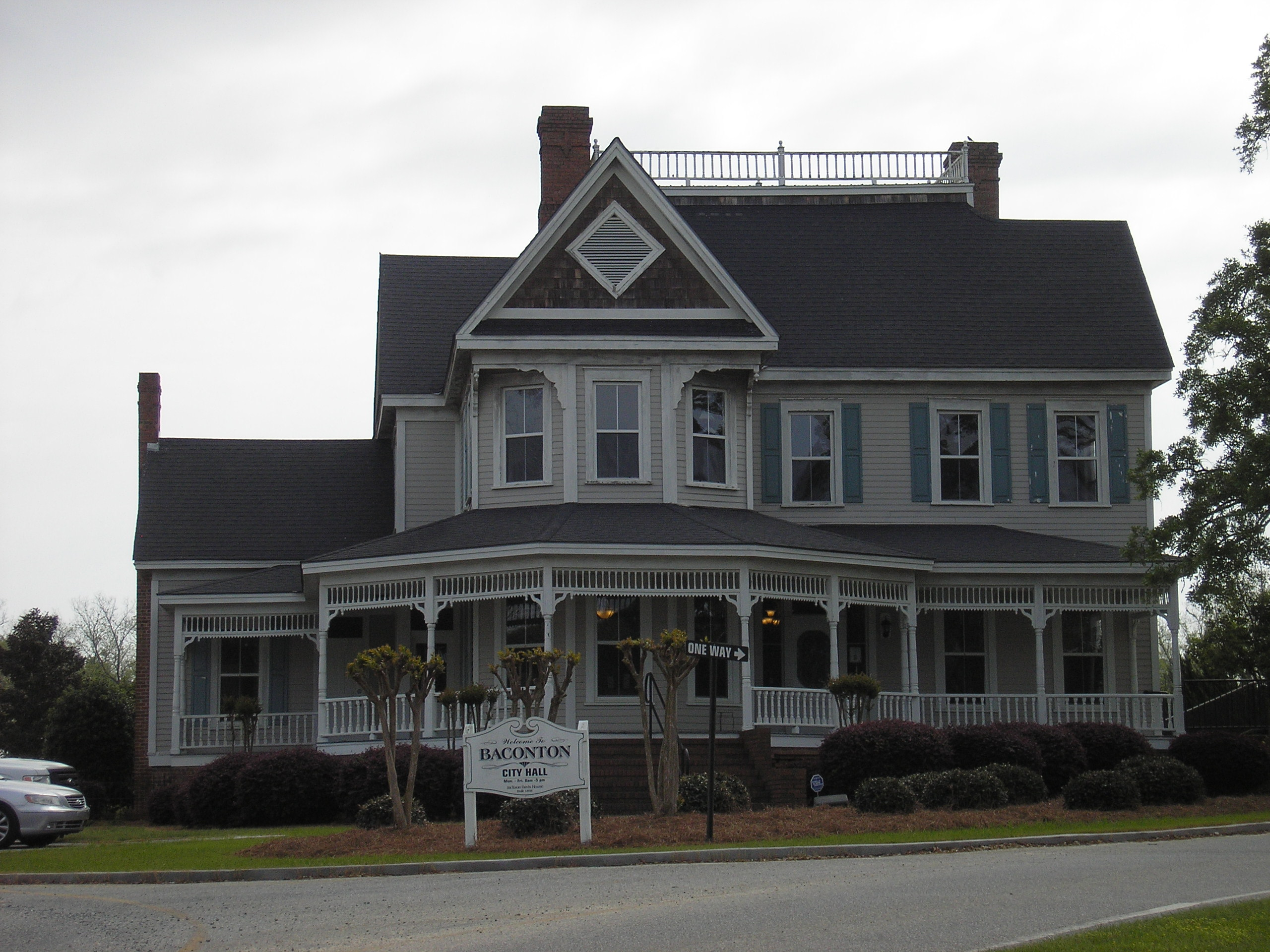

- Location within Georgia Location within the United States
- Location: 333 E. Walton St. (was formerly 102 S. Jackson St.), Baconton, Georgia
- Coordinates: 31.375077°N 84.152922°W
- Area: 19 acres (7.7 ha)
- Built: 1898
- Architectural style: Late Victorian
- MPS: Baconton MRA
- NRHP reference No.: 83003595
- Added to NRHP: December 1, 1983

The George W. Jackson House, in Baconton, Georgia, is a historic house built in 1898 that now serves as Baconton's city hall. It was listed on the National Register of Historic Places in 1983.

The main house was built in 1898 in Late Victorian style. It is a two-story frame house on a brick pier foundation.

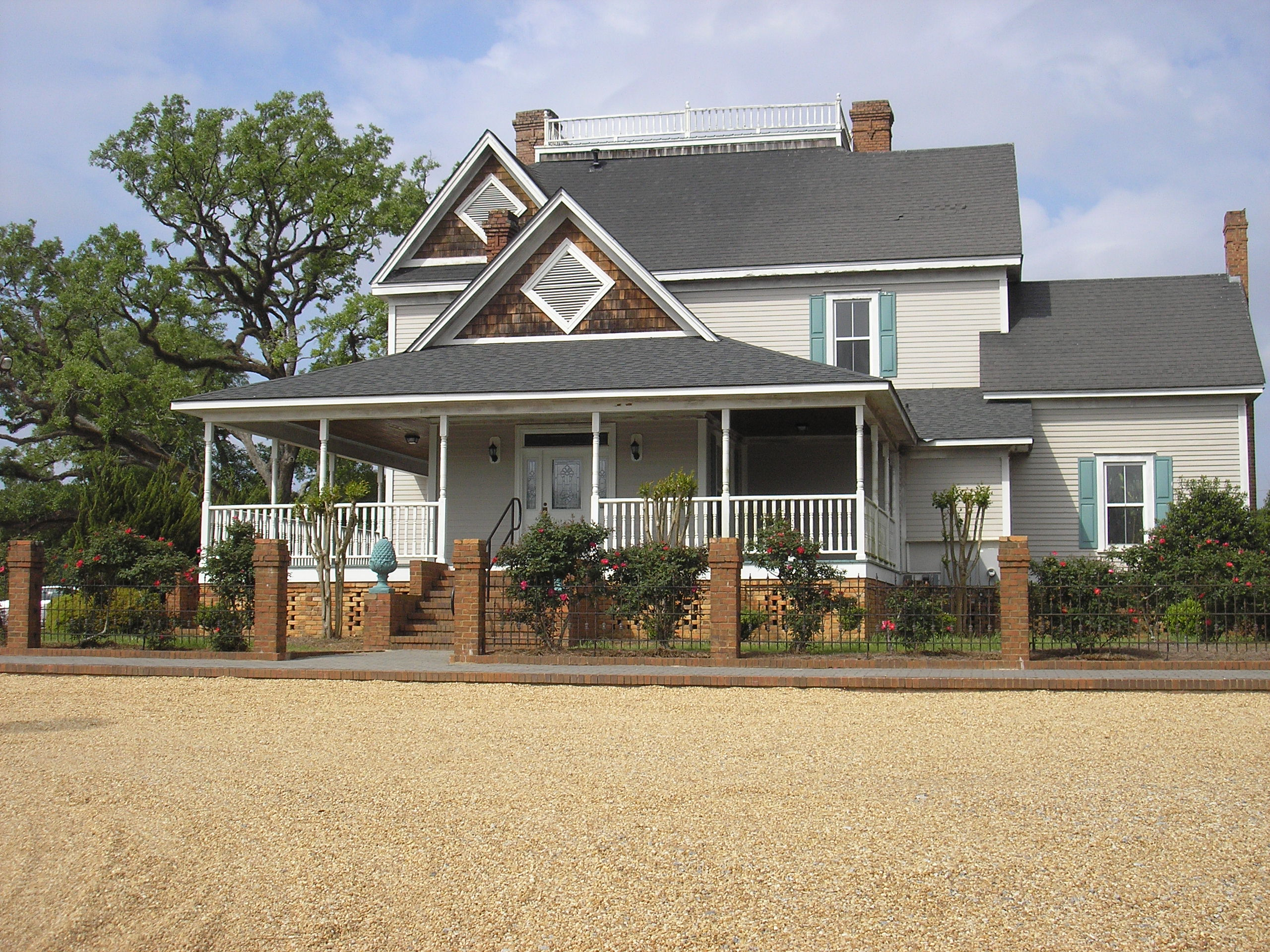
Back of house

The house was occupied by George Washington Jackson (1845-1914) then Eulelia Peacock Jackson (1854-1932).

The east side of the town of Baconton was developed from land owned by G.W. Jackson, and centered around the Methodist Church to which Jackson belonged. The house is on a slight rise at what was, in 1983, the east end of Walton Street; U.S. Highway 19 was to its east beyond a pecan grove. By 2013, Walton Street was continued and divided to go on both sides of the house and connect to the highway; the street and a gas station/convenience store property and a commercial store property facing the highway infringe upon the former historic property.

It was one of a number of Baconton area historic properties and districts that were evaluated for NRHP listing in 1983.

The 1983 listing included five contributing buildings and one contributing site on 19 acres (7.7 ha).

By 2017, development has changed the general area somewhat since the house was listed in 1983. Back then, there were pecan groves stretch on the east, south, and northeast of the house; in 2017 there are baseball fields northeast of the Walton St. & Jackson St. intersection that seem not to have been present in 1983.

In 1983 there were several dilapidated one-story outbuildings: a barn, a wagon shed, and a crib. And there was a one-story cook's house with two exterior brick chimneys, located on Jackson Street south of the main house. By 2013, the outbuildings are not apparent in Google satellite or street view, suggesting they are gone.
