= Area code 229 =

Telephone area code for southwest Georgia, United States

Coordinates: 31.57688°N 84.17617°W

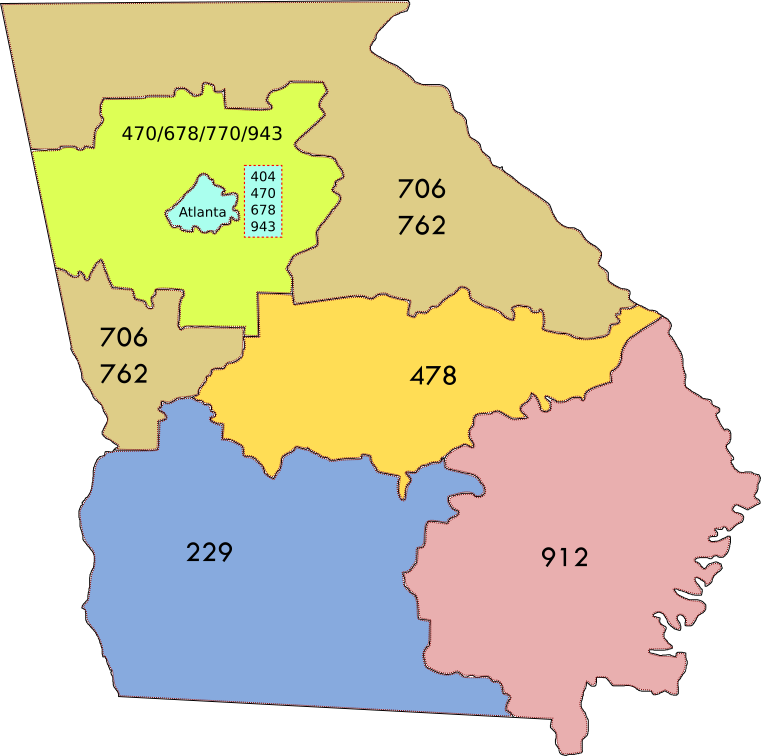

Area code 229 is a telephone area code in the North American Numbering Plan for the southwest corner of the U.S. state of Georgia. The numbering plan area includes the cities of Albany, Valdosta, Adel, Leesburg, Bainbridge, Americus, Vienna, Fitzgerald, Ocilla, Cairo, Moultrie, Thomasville, McRae-Helena, and Tifton.

The area code was created on August 1, 2000 in a three-way split of area code 912, which had served the southern half of Georgia for forty-six years. Savannah and the eastern portion retained area code 912, while Macon and the northern portion were assigned to area code 478. A one-year permissive dialing period was in effect until August 1, 2001 for ten-digit dialing into the numbering plan area, but several local routes remained available with seven-digit dialing.

Projections of October 2021 indicated that the area code is not expected to need relief until 2029.

== Service area ==
The service area comprises the following Georgia counties:

- Baker
- Ben Hill
- Berrien
- Brooks
- Calhoun
- Clay
- Colquitt
- Cook
- Crisp
- Decatur
- Dodge (part with area code 478)
- Dooly County, Georgia (part with area code 478)
- Dougherty
- Early
- Echols (part with area code 912)
- Grady
- Irwin
- Lanier
- Lee
- Lowndes
- Marion
- Miller
- Mitchell
- Pulaski (part with area code 478)
- Quitman
- Randolph
- Schley
- Seminole
- Stewart
- Sumter
- Telfair (part with area code 912)
- Terrell
- Thomas
- Tift
- Turner
- Webster
- Wilcox
- Worth

== In popular culture ==
229 spells ABY on the alphanumeric telephone keypad, which is an abbreviation of the city of Albany and the IATA airport code for Southwest Georgia Regional Airport"2011–2015 NPIAS Report, Appendix A" (PDF). National Plan of Integrated Airport Systems. Federal Aviation Administration. October 4, 2010. in the numbering plan area.

Georgia area codes: 229, 404, 478, 678/470/943, 706/762, 770, 912
	North: 706/762, 478	
West: 334	229	East: 912
	South: 850/448, 386	
Alabama area codes: 205/659, 251, 256/938, 334
Florida area codes: 239, 305/786/645, 321, 352, 386, 407/689, 561/728, 727, 772, 813/656, 850/448, 863, 904/324, 941, 954/754
