= Mitchell County, Georgia =

County in Georgia, United States

- County
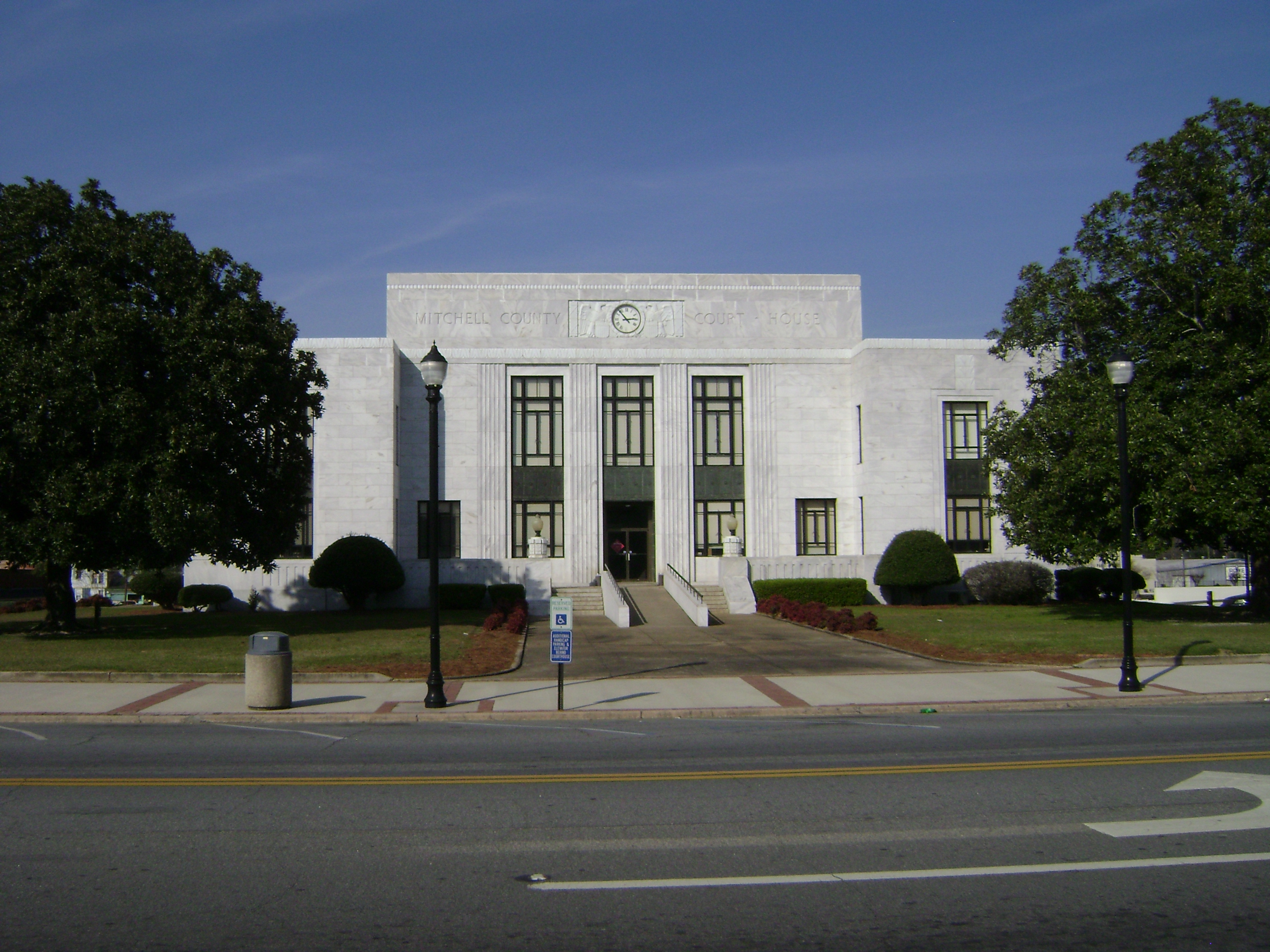
- Mitchell County Courthouse (Built 1936), Camilla

- Location within the U.S. state of Georgia
- Coordinates: 31°13′N 84°11′W
- Country: United States
- State: Georgia
- Founded: 1857; 169 years ago
- Seat: Camilla
- Largest city: Camilla

Area
  - Total: 514 sq mi (1,330 km^{2})
  - Land: 512 sq mi (1,330 km^{2})
  - Water: 1.7 sq mi (4.4 km^{2}) 0.3%

Population (2020)
  - Total: 21,755
  - Estimate (2025): 20,467 ▼
  - Density: 42/sq mi (16/km^{2})
- Time zone: UTC−5 (Eastern)
  - Summer (DST): UTC−4 (EDT)
- Congressional district: 2nd
- Website: www.mitchellcountyga.net

Mitchell County is a county in the U.S. state of Georgia. As of the 2020 census, the population was 21,755. The county seat is Camilla. Mitchell County was created on December 21, 1857.

== Etymology ==
Sources conflict as to whether Mitchell County was named for David Brydie Mitchell, the 27th Governor of Georgia, or for Henry Mitchell, a general in the Revolutionary War. However, it is most likely that the county was named for General Henry Mitchell, as a marker outside of the Mitchell County Courthouse says, "However, the Georgia Laws of 1857 (pages 38-40), creating Mitchell County, say the county was named in honor of Gen. Henry Mitchell...."

== History ==
Mitchell County was created out of Baker County on December 21, 1857. It is the state's 123rd county.

== Geography ==
According to the U.S. Census Bureau, the county has a total area of 514 square miles (1,330 km^{2}), of which 512 square miles (1,330 km^{2}) is land and 1.7 square miles (4.4 km^{2}) (0.3%) is water.

The bulk of Mitchell County is located in the Lower Flint River sub-basin of the ACF River Basin (Apalachicola-Chattahoochee-Flint River Basin). The county's southeastern corner, bordered by a line from Sale City southwest through Pelham, is located in the Lower Ochlockonee River sub-basin of the same Ochlockonee River basin.

=== Major highways ===
- U.S. Route 19 / State Route 3 / State Route 300
- State Route 37
  - State Route 37 Connector
- State Route 65
- State Route 93
- State Route 97
- State Route 111
- State Route 112
- State Route 262
- State Route 270
- State Route 311

=== Adjacent counties ===
- Dougherty County (north)
- Worth County (northeast)
- Colquitt County (east)
- Thomas County (southeast)
- Grady County (south)
- Decatur County (southwest)
- Baker County (west)

== Communities ==
=== Cities ===
- Baconton
- Camilla
- Meigs (partly in Thomas County)
- Pelham

=== Towns ===
- Sale City

=== Unincorporated communities ===
- Adelaide
- Branchville
- Cotton
- DeWitt
- Flint
- Greenough
- Greenwood
- Hinsonton
- Hopeful
- Laney
- Lester
- Pebble City
- Petty
- Rogerville
- Saco
- Vada (partly in Decatur County)

== Demographics ==
Historical population
Census	Pop.	Note	%±
1860	4,308		—
1870	6,633		54.0%
1880	9,392		41.6%
1890	10,906		16.1%
1900	14,767		35.4%
1910	22,114		49.8%
1920	25,588		15.7%
1930	23,620		−7.7%
1940	23,261		−1.5%
1950	22,528		−3.2%
1960	19,652		−12.8%
1970	18,956		−3.5%
1980	21,114		11.4%
1990	20,275		−4.0%
2000	23,932		18.0%
2010	23,498		−1.8%
2020	21,755		−7.4%
2025 (est.)	20,467	▼	−5.9%
U.S. Decennial Census; 1790-1880 1890-1910; 1920-1930 1930-1940; 1940-1950 1960-1980; 1980-2000 2010

=== Racial and ethnic composition ===
Mitchell County, Georgia – Racial and ethnic composition Note: the US Census treats Hispanic/Latino as an ethnic category. This table excludes Latinos from the racial categories and assigns them to a separate category. Hispanics/Latinos may be of any race.
Race / Ethnicity (NH = Non-Hispanic)	Pop 1980	Pop 1990	Pop 2000	Pop 2010	Pop 2020	% 1980	% 1990	% 2000	% 2010	% 2020
White alone (NH)	10,841	10,338	11,746	10,894	10,106	51.35%	50.99%	49.08%	46.36%	46.45%
Black or African American alone (NH)	10,029	9,611	11,423	11,185	10,054	47.50%	47.40%	47.73%	47.60%	46.21%
Native American or Alaska Native alone (NH)	4	51	41	60	37	0.02%	0.25%	0.17%	0.26%	0.17%
Asian alone (NH)	22	15	61	120	108	0.10%	0.07%	0.25%	0.51%	0.50%
Native Hawaiian or Pacific Islander alone (NH)	x	x	8	4	0	x	x	0.03%	0.02%	0.00%
Other race alone (NH)	8	0	8	18	41	0.04%	0.00%	0.03%	0.08%	0.19%
Mixed race or Multiracial (NH)	x	x	154	189	445	x	x	0.64%	0.80%	2.05%
Hispanic or Latino (any race)	210	260	491	1,028	964	0.99%	1.28%	2.05%	4.37%	4.43%
Total	21,114	20,275	23,932	23,498	21,755	100.00%	100.00%	100.00%	100.00%	100.00%

=== 2020 census ===
As of the 2020 census, there were 21,755 people, 8,156 households, and 5,454 families residing in the county. The median age was 42.3 years, with 21.6% of residents under the age of 18 and 19.0% of residents aged 65 years or older.

For every 100 females there were 103.0 males, and for every 100 females age 18 and over there were 103.2 males. 24.2% of residents lived in urban areas, while 75.8% lived in rural areas.

The racial makeup of the county was 47.2% White, 46.5% Black or African American, 0.2% American Indian and Alaska Native, 0.5% Asian, 0.0% Native Hawaiian and Pacific Islander, 2.8% from some other race, and 2.7% from two or more races. Hispanic or Latino residents of any race comprised 4.4% of the population.

Among the 8,156 households in the county, 28.9% had children under the age of 18 living with them and 36.7% had a female householder with no spouse or partner present. About 29.3% of all households were made up of individuals and 13.5% had someone living alone who was 65 years of age or older.

There were 9,036 housing units, of which 9.7% were vacant. Among occupied housing units, 63.5% were owner-occupied and 36.5% were renter-occupied. The homeowner vacancy rate was 1.3% and the rental vacancy rate was 8.0%.

== Education ==
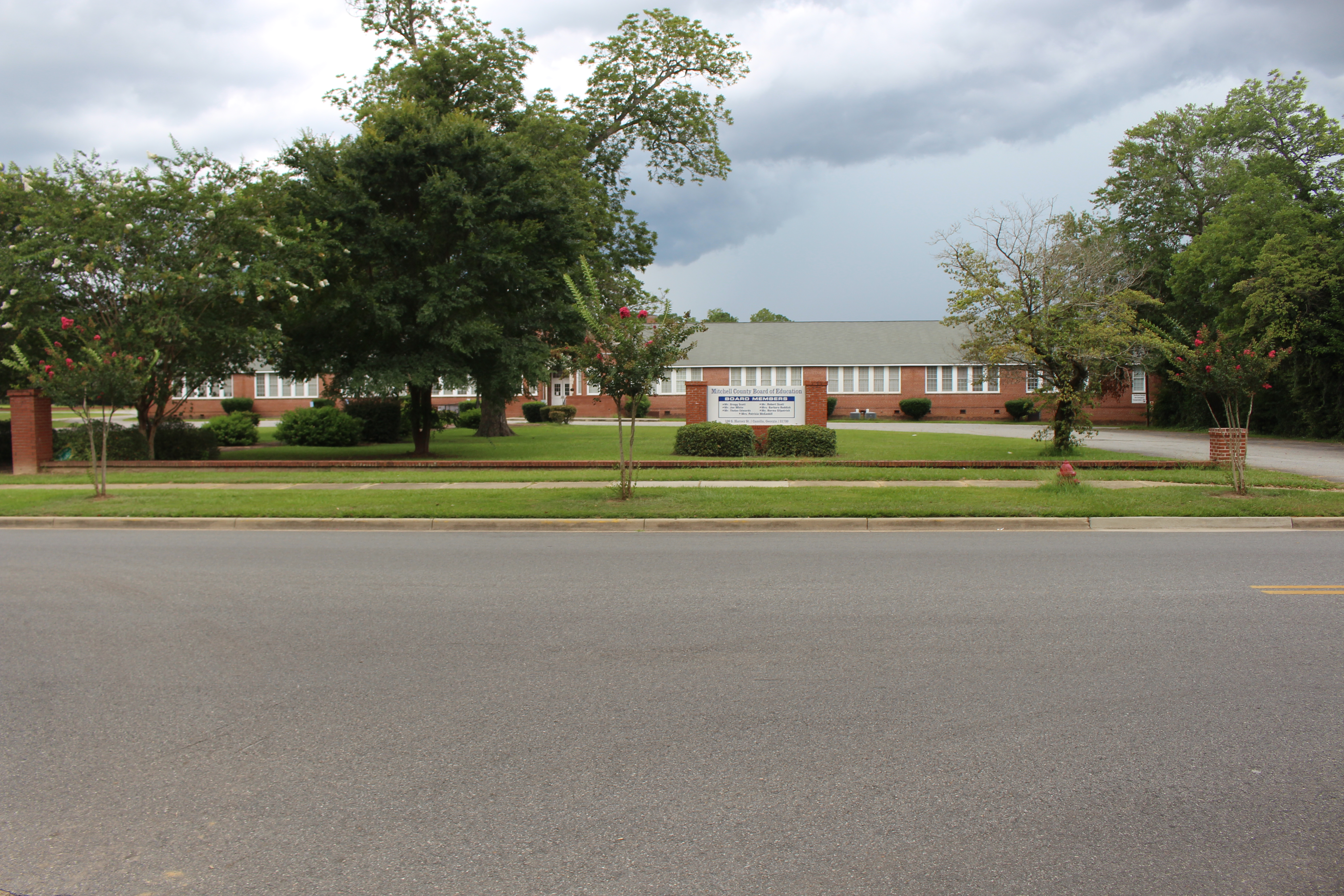
Mitchell County School District headquarters

The Mitchell County School District operates public schools in the majority of the county, although Pelham City School District includes the city limits of Pelham.

Andersonville Theological Seminary has its headquarters based in Camilla. The seminary's headquarters consists of two administrative buildings. Most of the seminary's students take online classes to complete their degree programs, but in January 2020 the school started to provide on-site courses at their location in Camilla.

== Politics ==
As of the 2020s, Mitchell County is a Republican stronghold, voting 58% for Donald Trump in 2024. For elections to the United States House of Representatives, Mitchell County is part of Georgia's 2nd congressional district, currently represented by Sanford Bishop. For elections to the Georgia State Senate, Mitchell County is part of District 12. For elections to the Georgia House of Representatives, Mitchell County is part of District 171.

United States presidential election results for Mitchell County, Georgia
Year	Republican		Democratic		Third party(ies)	
Year	No.	%	No.	%	No.	%
1912	150	12.54%	1,046	87.46%	0	0.00%
1916	96	9.07%	921	87.05%	41	3.88%
1920	144	13.41%	930	86.59%	0	0.00%
1924	51	6.09%	736	87.83%	51	6.09%
1928	143	9.53%	1,358	90.47%	0	0.00%
1932	15	0.71%	2,097	99.06%	5	0.24%
1936	79	3.32%	2,297	96.47%	5	0.21%
1940	155	6.78%	2,131	93.22%	0	0.00%
1944	226	9.40%	2,179	90.60%	0	0.00%
1948	152	7.35%	1,453	70.30%	462	22.35%
1952	601	16.44%	3,054	83.56%	0	0.00%
1956	382	12.26%	2,735	87.74%	0	0.00%
1960	430	11.64%	3,264	88.36%	0	0.00%
1964	3,265	73.17%	1,197	26.83%	0	0.00%
1968	731	12.97%	1,256	22.29%	3,647	64.73%
1972	2,400	68.18%	1,120	31.82%	0	0.00%
1976	1,572	25.91%	4,495	74.09%	0	0.00%
1980	2,231	38.10%	3,566	60.89%	59	1.01%
1984	2,737	49.51%	2,791	50.49%	0	0.00%
1988	2,590	53.29%	2,260	46.50%	10	0.21%
1992	1,917	33.08%	3,052	52.67%	826	14.25%
1996	2,033	36.39%	3,165	56.66%	388	6.95%
2000	2,790	48.11%	2,971	51.23%	38	0.66%
2004	3,885	53.42%	3,360	46.20%	27	0.37%
2008	4,201	51.66%	3,872	47.61%	59	0.73%
2012	4,155	50.18%	4,081	49.28%	45	0.54%
2016	4,279	54.30%	3,493	44.33%	108	1.37%
2020	4,935	55.06%	3,993	44.55%	35	0.39%
2024	5,150	58.02%	3,701	41.69%	26	0.29%

United States Senate election results for Mitchell County, Georgia2
Year	Republican		Democratic		Third party(ies)	
Year	No.	%	No.	%	No.	%
2020	4,921	55.47%	3,832	43.20%	118	1.33%
2020	4,309	54.86%	3,546	45.14%	0	0.00%

United States Senate election results for Mitchell County, Georgia3
Year	Republican		Democratic		Third party(ies)	
Year	No.	%	No.	%	No.	%
2020	2,538	28.82%	2,598	29.50%	3,670	41.68%
2020	4,300	54.64%	3,569	45.36%	0	0.00%
2022	3,986	56.78%	2,953	42.07%	81	1.15%
2022	3,716	57.05%	2,798	42.95%	0	0.00%

Georgia Gubernatorial election results for Mitchell County
Year	Republican		Democratic		Third party(ies)	
Year	No.	%	No.	%	No.	%
2022	4,197	59.52%	2,829	40.12%	26	0.37%

== Notable people ==
- George Thornewell Smith - former Lieutenant Governor of Georgia and state court judge

== See also ==
- National Register of Historic Places listings in Mitchell County, Georgia
- List of counties in Georgia
