= Area code 727 =

Area code for Pinellas County, Florida, United States

Area code 727 is a telephone area code in the North American Numbering Plan (NANP) for a narrow coastal region in the U.S. state of Florida west of Tampa including St. Petersburg and Clearwater.

== History ==
727 was going to be introduced in an area code overlay to 813. At the time, overlays were a new concept and since overlays result in mixing area codes within the same area (issuing the new code to new numbers) requiring 10-digit dialing, they were often met with public resistance. GTE (now part of Frontier Communications), the dominant carrier in most of the Tampa Bay Area, switched the proposal to a split plan.

The split largely followed county lines, with the notable exception of Oldsmar, most of which stayed in 813. Oldsmar's trunk is wired into the Tampa line, and it would have been too expensive for GTE to rewire it.

== Service area ==
Area code 727 covers Pinellas County, Florida (including St. Petersburg, Clearwater, and Pinellas Park, among many other municipalities, but excluding the majority of Oldsmar), and the western third of Pasco County (including Port Richey, New Port Richey, and Holiday). For 43 years, the 13 counties around Tampa Bay, including cities such as Sarasota, Ellenton, and Port Charlotte were in area code 813. In 1998, Pinellas County and the western part of Pasco County were split into area code 727.

== See also ==
- List of Florida area codes
- List of NANP area codes

Florida area codes: 239, 305/786/645, 321, 352, 386, 407/689, 561/728, 727, 772, 813/656, 850/448, 863, 904/324, 941, 954/754
| | North: 352 | |
| West: Gulf of Mexico | 727 | East: 813/656 |
| | South: 941 | |
