= Area code 352 =

Telephone area code for Ocala, Florida

Area code 352 is a telephone area code in the North American Numbering Plan for the area around Gainesville, Florida. It was split from area code 904 in 1995.

The numbering plan area includes all of Dixie, Gilchrist, Levy, Marion, Citrus, Sumter, Lake (with the exception of Montverde, Florida), and Hernando counties, and all but the extreme north of Alachua County. It also includes the southern and eastern tips of Bradford County, the west edge of northern Putnam County, the southwestern part of Clay County, the northeast and north central parts of Pasco county, and the Steinhatchee and Tennile communities in southern Taylor County.

Prior to October 2021, area code 352 had telephone numbers assigned for the central office code 988. In 2020, 988 was designated nationwide as a dialing code for the National Suicide Prevention Lifeline, which created a conflict for exchanges that permit seven-digit dialing. This area code was therefore scheduled to transition to ten-digit dialing by October 24, 2021.

Per March 2023 projections, 352 is expected to exhaust its central office code pool in late 2027, requiring mitigation action by the numbering administrators.

== See also ==
- List of Florida area codes
- List of North American Numbering Plan area codes

Florida area codes: 239, 305/786/645, 321, 352, 386, 407/689, 561/728, 727, 772, 813/656, 850/448, 863, 904/324, 941, 954/754
	North: 386, 904/324	
West: 850/448, Gulf of Mexico	352	East: 321/407/689, 386
	South: 727, 813/656, 863	
