= Area code 772 =

Area code in Florida, United States

Area code 772 is a telephone area code in the North American Numbering Plan (NANP) for the Treasure Coast in the east central part of the U.S. state of Florida. The numbering plan area (NPA) includes Sebastian, Fellsmere, Vero Beach, Fort Pierce, Port St. Lucie, Jensen Beach, Stuart, Hobe Sound, and Indiantown. The area code was created in 2002 in a split from area code 561, in relief of numbering pool exhaustion due in part to the increase of cell phone users.

The Treasure Coast was served by four area codes in about a 15-year span.

Since 1947, the numbering plan area (NPA) was served for 41 years by area code 305, until area code 407 was created in 1988. After belonging to NPA 561 since 1996, it finally split off with area code 772 in 2002. Today, despite the Treasure Coast's rapid growth, 772 is nowhere near exhaustion; NANP projections estimate that the region will not need another area code until at least 2069.

== See also ==
- List of Florida area codes
- List of North American Numbering Plan area codes

Florida area codes: 239, 305/786/645, 321, 352, 386, 407/689, 561/728, 727, 772, 813/656, 850/448, 863, 904/324, 941, 954/754
| | North: 321 | |
| West: 321/407/689, 863 | 772 | East: Atlantic Ocean |
| | South: 561/728 | |
