= Area codes 813 and 656 =

Telephone area code for Tampa, Florida

Area codes 813 and 656 are area codes in the North American Numbering Plan for the U.S. state of Florida in the city of Tampa, Florida, and its surrounding areas, such as Zephyrhills and Oldsmar. In 2022, due to exhaustion of central office prefixes, area code 656 was added to the service area forming an overlay complex.

== Service area ==
Area codes 656 and 813 are assigned to a numbering plan area (NPA) that comprises all of Hillsborough County, the city of Oldsmar in Pinellas County, and the central and southeastern portions of Pasco County. The northeastern portion of Pasco County has area code 352, while the western portion uses area code 727.

== History ==
In 1947, the American Telephone and Telegraph Company (AT&T) announced the first nationwide telephone numbering plan and divided the United States and Canada into 86 numbering plan areas and assigned the original North American area codes, a unique code for each area, to speed the connection times for Operator Toll Dialing.

The state of Florida was a single numbering plan area with area code 305. In 1953, with the development of Direct Distance Dialing, the western part of the peninsula from the Tampa Bay area south, which was serviced mostly by General Telephone (GTE), was designated as a separate numbering plan area with area code 813. The new number plan area stretched along the Gulf Coast from Pasco County to Collier County and included the cities of St. Petersburg, Sarasota, Fort Myers, and Lakeland.

On May 28, 1995, thirteen counties south and east of Hillsborough County, from Manatee County to Collier County, split from the numbering plan area 813 after 39 years in the coverage area and were assigned area code 941.

Although the 1995 split was intended to be a long-term solution, within only three years, 813 was close to exhaustion again because of the rapid growth of telephone service in the Tampa Bay area and the proliferation of cell phones and pagers. The Florida Public Service Commission decided to assign area code 727 as another area code for the region. It was originally planned to be an overlay on 813. However, overlays were still a new concept, and the mixing of area codes in the same region, and the resulting requirement for ten-digit dialing, met considerable resistance. As a result, the area of most of Pinellas County (except Oldsmar) and western Pasco County were split off on February 1, 1999 and received area code 727.

Oldsmar kept area code 813 despite being in Pinellas. Oldsmar was a tributary service area to the Tampa area, and tributary routes were in general not cut across NPA boundaries. Oldsmar is also located on the Pinellas/Hillsborough line, and was the only local exchange that was a local call to both cities. Most of the dialup Internet access numbers and alarm system reporting numbers in Tampa and St. Petersburg were located in Oldsmar. GTE and the Florida Public Service Commission wanted to spare alarm companies and ISPs the cost of reprogramming and replacing systems that could not handle 10 digit dialing.

In 2022, the available telephone numbers for area code 813 were expected to be exhausted during the third quarter of 2022. As a result, the North American Numbering Plan Administrator authorized an "all services overlay", which was approved by the Florida Public Service Commission on March 31, 2020. The new area code 656 started service on February 22, 2022, but only after all available central office prefixes of 813 had been assigned. This required ten-digit dialing within the numbering plan area.

== See also ==
- List of Florida area codes
- List of North American Numbering Plan area codes

Florida area codes: 239, 305/786/645, 321, 352, 386, 407/689, 561/728, 727, 772, 813/656, 850/448, 863, 904/324, 941, 954/754
	North: 352	
West: 727	656/813	East: 863
	South: 941	
