= Area codes 407 and 689 =

Area codes for Orlando, Florida

Coordinates: 28°32′24″N 81°22′48″W

Area codes 407 and 689 are telephone area codes in the North American Numbering Plan (NANP) for the city of Orlando and surrounding areas in the U.S. state of Florida. The numbering plan area (NPA) includes Orange, Osceola and Seminole counties, as well as small portions of Volusia and Lake counties.

Area code 407 was created in 1988 in a split of area code 305, Florida's original area code of 1947. When assigned, 407 included not only most of Central Florida, but also the Palm Beaches and Treasure Coast. In 1996, Palm Beach, Martin, Indian River, and St. Lucie counties were split from the numbering plan area and received area code 561. The latter area code has since been split to form area code 772.

In October 2000, Brevard County was split off with area code 321. At the same time, 321 was also overlaid on Orange, Osceola, and Seminole counties. The small portion of Volusia County that was located in 407 (the Deltona area) continued to use only 407. In 2003, it was announced that all new telephone numbers in the three counties would no longer be issued in 321, although 321 numbers in the Orlando metro area would keep that area code.

In 2001, Deltona was switched to area code 386 when 386 was split from 904. All of 407 is now overlaid with 321 and 689.

Area code 689 was assigned as an overlay of 407 (but not the standalone 321 area) in June 2019. Assignments in 321 remain frozen and primarily focused on Brevard County.

== See also ==
- List of Florida area codes
- List of NANP area codes

Florida area codes: 239, 305/786/645, 321, 352, 386, 407/689, 561/728, 727, 772, 813/656, 850/448, 863, 904/324, 941, 954/754
	North: 386	
West: 352, 863	area code 407/689/part of 321	East: 321 standalone, 772
	South: 772, 863	
