= Area code 863 =

Telephone area code for south-central Florida

Area code 863 is a telephone area code in the North American Numbering Plan for a part of south-central Florida. The numbering plan area comprises the Heartland, as well as Polk County in Central Florida. Some of the larger cities in the numbering plan area include Lakeland, Bartow, Winter Haven, Lake Wales, Sebring, Clewiston, Avon Park, Arcadia, Poinciana, and Okeechobee City.

== History ==
Numbering plan area (NPA) 863 used to be part of NPA 305, which was originally the entire state of Florida. In 1953, the southwest Florida coast was split off with area code 813, while all of north Florida was split off with area code 904 in 1965. The southeast portion retained 305. Area code 813 was unmodified for 43 years until 1996, when the 13 counties outside of the immediate Tampa Bay area (all but Hillsborough, Pinellas, and Pasco counties) were assigned area code 941. In 1999, numbering plan area 863 took its current form as the coastal counties kept 941, while the rest received area code 863.

== Service area ==
Numbering plan area 863 includes the total area of the following counties: Polk, Hardee, Highlands, Glades, and Hendry. It also includes almost the entire areas of De Soto and Okeechobee counties, and small parts of Hillsborough, and St. Lucie counties.

Area code 863 is Florida's first land-locked area code (not counting the northwest portion of area code 386).

== See also ==
- List of Florida area codes
- List of North American Numbering Plan area codes

Florida area codes: 239, 305/786/645, 321, 352, 386, 407/689, 561/728, 727, 772, 813/656, 850/448, 863, 904/324, 941, 954/754
	North: 321/407/689, 352	
West: 813/656, 941	863	East: 561/728, 772
	South: 239, 954/754	
