= Area code 321 =

Area code for east central Florida

Area code 321 is an area code in the North American Numbering Plan (NANP) for Brevard and Seminole counties, and the Space Coast region in the U.S. state of Florida. The area code was activated in 2000, as an overlay for the Orlando area.

Prior to October 2021, the area code had telephone numbers assigned for the central office code 988, which created conflicts given the designation of 988 as a three-digit code for the National Suicide Prevention Lifeline. In 2020, the Federal Communications Commission ordered 82 area codes to transition to ten-digit dialing, including 321, in the area not overlaid by 407. Per the timeline set by the North American Numbering Plan Administrator (NANPA), permissive dialing began on April 24, 2021, and 10-digit dialing was required on October 24, 2021.

American Space Museum volunteer Robert Osband petitioned the creation of area code 321. The code refers to the countdown sequence which has launched many spacecraft from Cape Canaveral.

== See also ==
- List of Florida area codes
- List of North American Numbering Plan area codes

Florida area codes: 239, 305/786/645, 321, 352, 386, 407/689, 561/728, 727, 772, 813/656, 850/448, 863, 904/324, 941, 954/754
| | North: 386 | |
| West: 407/689/part of 321 | 321 | East: Atlantic Ocean |
| | South: 772 | |
