= Area code 239 =

Area code in southwestern Florida

Area code 239 is a telephone area code in the North American Numbering Plan (NANP) for a part of Southwestern Florida. The numbering plan area (NPA) includes Lee and Collier counties, small parts of Hendry and Charlotte counties and the Everglades National Park in Mainland Monroe County. The area code was activated for service on March 11, 2002, in an area code split in which the southern half of NPA 941, from North Fort Myers, was renumbered with 239. A permissive dialing period ended on March 10, 2003.

== Service area ==
- Alva
- Bonita Springs
- Buckingham
- Cape Coral
- Captiva
- Cypress Lake
- East Naples
- Estero
- Everglades City
- Fort Myers
- Fort Myers Beach
- Golden Gate
- Golden Gate City
- Golden Gate Estates
- Harlem Heights
- Immokalee
- Iona
- Lehigh Acres
- Lely
- Marco Island
- McGregor
- Naples
- Naples Manor
- North Fort Myers
- North Naples
- Pine Island
- Punta Rassa
- Saint James City
- San Carlos Park
- Sanibel
- Suncoast Estates
- Tice
- Vanderbilt Beach
- Whiskey Creek

== See also ==
- List of Florida area codes
- List of North American Numbering Plan area codes

Florida area codes: 239, 305/786/645, 321, 352, 386, 407/689, 561/728, 727, 772, 813/656, 850/448, 863, 904/324, 941, 954/754
	North: 863, 941	
West: Gulf of Mexico	239	East: 305/786/645, 954/754
	South: 305/786/645 (Keys)	
