= Area code 941 =

Telephone area code for Southwest Florida

Area code 941 is a telephone area code in the North American Numbering Plan for a southwest coastal portion of the U.S. state of Florida. Introduced on May 28, 1995, the numbering plan area includes the counties of Manatee, Sarasota, and Charlotte, areas along the Sun Coast of southwestern Florida, USA. It is the area code for North Port-Bradenton-Sarasota, Florida Metropolitan Statistical Area.

DeSoto County, Charlotte County, Hardee County, Polk County, Okeechobee County, Glades County, and Hendry County were part of this area code until 1999, when area code 863 was created, and Lee County and Collier County were part of 941 until March 2003 when area code 239 was created. Before the designation of area code 941, the region was originally served by 305, then by area code 813.

Prior to October 2021, area code 941 had telephone numbers assigned for the central office code 988. In 2020, 988 was designated nationwide as a dialing code for the National Suicide Prevention Lifeline, which created a conflict for exchanges that permit seven-digit dialing. This area code was therefore scheduled to transition to ten-digit dialing by October 24, 2021.

== See also ==
- List of Florida area codes
- List of North American Numbering Plan area codes

Florida area codes: 239, 305/786/645, 321, 352, 386, 407/689, 561/728, 727, 772, 813/656, 850/448, 863, 904/324, 941, 954/754
	North: 813/656	
West: Gulf of Mexico	941	East: 863
	South: 239	
