= Baconton, Georgia =

- City
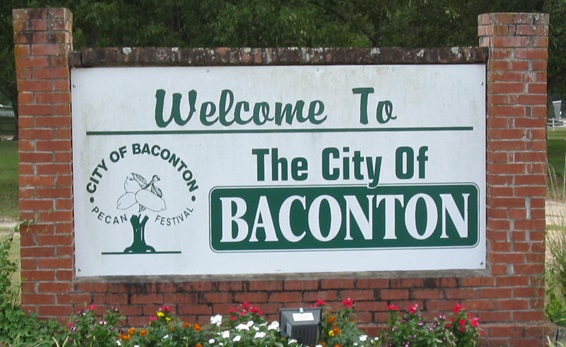
- Motto: Baconton welcome sign located at the intersection of US-19 & GA-93

- Location in Mitchell County and the state of Georgia
- Coordinates: 31°22′34″N 84°9′41″W
- Country: United States
- State: Georgia
- County: Mitchell

Area
  - Total: 1.95 sq mi (5.05 km^{2})
  - Land: 1.95 sq mi (5.05 km^{2})
  - Water: 0 sq mi (0.00 km^{2})
- Elevation: 174 ft (53 m)

Population (2020)
  - Total: 856
  - Density: 438.6/sq mi (169.34/km^{2})
- Time zone: UTC-5 (Eastern (EST))
  - Summer (DST): UTC-4 (EDT)
- ZIP code: 31716
- Area code: 229
- FIPS code: 13-04840
- GNIS feature ID: 0331077
- Website: www.cityofbaconton.net

Baconton is a city in Mitchell County, Georgia, United States. As of the 2020 census, the city had a population of 856, down from 915 in 2010.

== History ==
Baconton was incorporated in 1903. The community was named after Major Robert James Bacon, an original owner of the town site.

== Geography ==
Baconton is located in northern Mitchell County at 31°22′34″N 84°9′41″W (31.376002, -84.161468). U.S. Route 19 runs along the eastern border of the city, leading south 10 miles (16 km) to Camilla, the county seat, and north 16 miles (26 km) to Albany.

According to the United States Census Bureau, Baconton has a total area of 2.0 square miles (5.2 km^{2}), all land. The Flint River passes 1 mile (1.6 km) to the west of the city.

Soils of Baconton are mostly well drained or somewhat excessively drained. They have grayish brown loamy sand topsoils overlying yellowish brown or red sandy clay loam subsoils. All belong to the Ultisol soil order. Where agricultural or urban development have not occurred, these soils support mixed forests dominated by pines and oaks.

== Demographics ==
Historical population
| Census | Pop. | Note | %± |
|---|---|---|---|
| 1910 | 391 | | — |
| 1920 | 568 | | 45.3% |
| 1930 | 498 | | −12.3% |
| 1940 | 504 | | 1.2% |
| 1950 | 500 | | −0.8% |
| 1960 | 564 | | 12.8% |
| 1970 | 710 | | 25.9% |
| 1980 | 763 | | 7.5% |
| 1990 | 623 | | −18.3% |
| 2000 | 804 | | 29.1% |
| 2010 | 915 | | 13.8% |
| 2020 | 856 | | −6.4% |
U.S. Decennial Census; 1850-1870 1870-1880; 1890-1910 1920-1930; 1940 1950 1960; 1970 1980 1990; 2000 2010

=== Racial and ethnic composition ===
Baconton city, Georgia – Racial and ethnic composition Note: the US Census treats Hispanic/Latino as an ethnic category. This table excludes Latinos from the racial categories and assigns them to a separate category. Hispanics/Latinos may be of any race.
| Race / Ethnicity (NH = Non-Hispanic) | Pop 2000 | Pop 2010 | Pop 2020 | % 2000 | % 2010 | % 2020 |
|---|---|---|---|---|---|---|
| White alone (NH) | 301 | 347 | 338 | 37.44% | 37.92% | 39.49% |
| Black or African American alone (NH) | 480 | 533 | 479 | 59.70% | 58.25% | 55.96% |
| Native American or Alaska Native alone (NH) | 7 | 2 | 2 | 0.87% | 0.22% | 0.23% |
| Asian alone (NH) | 0 | 6 | 5 | 0.00% | 0.66% | 0.58% |
| Native Hawaiian or Pacific Islander alone (NH) | 1 | 0 | 0 | 0.12% | 0.00% | 0.00% |
| Other race alone (NH) | 0 | 0 | 3 | 0.00% | 0.00% | 0.35% |
| Mixed race or Multiracial (NH) | 6 | 17 | 23 | 0.75% | 1.86% | 2.69% |
| Hispanic or Latino (any race) | 9 | 10 | 6 | 1.12% | 1.09% | 0.70% |
| Total | 804 | 915 | 856 | 100.00% | 100.00% | 100.00% |

=== 2020 census ===
As of the 2020 United States census, there were 856 people, 335 households, and 288 families residing in the city.

== Education ==
The Mitchell County School District serves Baconton students, as well as Camilla students.

- Public Schools
  - North Mitchell County Elementary School
- Charter Schools
  - Baconton Community Charter Schools
