= Area codes 423 and 729 =

Area code in East Tennessee, United States

Numbering plan area 423 (red), today overlaid with 729 since 2025

Area codes 423 and 729 are telephone area codes in the North American Numbering Plan (NANP) for the U.S. state of Tennessee. The numbering plan area comprises two geographically disjoined areas of East Tennessee, separated by numbering plan area 865, as well as portions of Van Buren and Sequatchie counties in Middle Tennessee.

Principal cities in the northern part of the numbering plan area are Morristown, Greeneville, and the Tri-Cities (Kingsport, Johnson City, Bristol). The principal cities in the south are Chattanooga and Cleveland.

== History ==
When the American Telephone and Telegraph Company created the first nationwide telephone numbering plan for Operator Toll Dialing, the predessessor of the North American Numbering Plan, in 1947, Tennessee was a single numbering plan area (NPA) with area code 901. In 1954, 901 was reduced to West Tennessee, while the rest of the state received area code 615.

In 1995, the eastern portion of 615, including Knoxville, Chattanooga, and the Tri-Cities, was split off with area code 423. This was the first new area code in the state in 41 years.

The boundary between 423 and 615 roughly followed the line between the Eastern and Central time zones; generally, Tennessee's share of the Eastern Time Zone was in 423. As a result, the state's three area codes were roughly coextensive with the traditional Grand Divisions of Tennessee. The new 423 served almost all of East Tennessee, with 615 serving Middle Tennessee and 901 serving West Tennessee.

The Tennessee Regulatory Authority intended this configuration to be a long-term solution. However, within only three years, 423 was already close to exhaustion due to the proliferation of cell phones and pagers, particularly in Knoxville and Chattanooga. It soon became apparent that East Tennessee needed another area code, even though this would have forced many residents and businesses to change their numbers for the second time in a decade.

On November 1, 1999, area code 865 was created for Knoxville and most of the central portion of East Tennessee. Permissive dialing of 423 continued across East Tennessee until April 22, 2000. Relief planning discovered that the Tri-Cities had too much traffic to follow Knoxville into 865, but were not large enough for a new area code through a three-way split. This left the Tennessee Regulatory Authority with two options–a split plan that would create two non-contiguous sections of 423, or implement 865 as an overlay complex for all of East Tennessee. The Tennessee Regulatory Authority selected the first option, since overlays were a new concept at the time, and had encountered some resistance due to the need for ten-digit dialing.

Normal practice would have called for Knoxville to retain 423, as it was the largest city in the numbering plan area. However, the Tennessee Regulatory Authority asked for Knoxville to receive 865 because on an alpha-numeric telephone keypad, those numbers correspond to VOL (Volunteers) the nickname for the sports teams at the University of Tennessee.

This created one of the few area codes in the nation that is not contiguous, as 865 is almost entirely surrounded by 423 except on the east. Although this seemed to be a temporary solution, the North American Numbering Plan Administration initially determined that the reconfigured 423 would not be exhausted until around 2010. With the 2002 implementation of number pooling in the southern portion of the area code (the Chattanooga area), the Tennessee Regulatory Authority projects that 423 will remain in its unusual, non-contiguous state until 2025. Even after that, an overlay of 423 was approved ensuring the configuration will be maintained.

On May 30, 2023, the Tennessee Public Utility Commission approved the all-service overlay of area code 423 with area code 729. Permissive ten-digit dialing started on August 5, 2024, and became mandatory on August 5, 2025. Central office code activations for 729 could begin on September 5, 2025, the official in-service date, provided that all assignable 423-central office codes have been exhausted.

== See also ==
- List of Tennessee area codes
- List of North American Numbering Plan area codes

Tennessee area codes: 423, 615/629, 731, 865, 901, 931
	North: 606, 276	
West: 931	423/729	East: 336, 828
	South: 256, 706/762	
Alabama area codes: 205/659, 251, 256/938, 334
Georgia area codes: 229, 404, 478, 678/470/943, 706/762, 770, 912
Kentucky area codes: 270/364, 502, 606, 859
Virginia area codes: 276, 434, 540/826, 703/571, 757/948, 804/686
North Carolina area codes: 252, 336/743, 704/980, 828, 910/472, 919/984
