= Area codes 706 and 762 =

Area codes for northern and west central Georgia, United States

Coordinates: 33.95735°N 83.37680°W

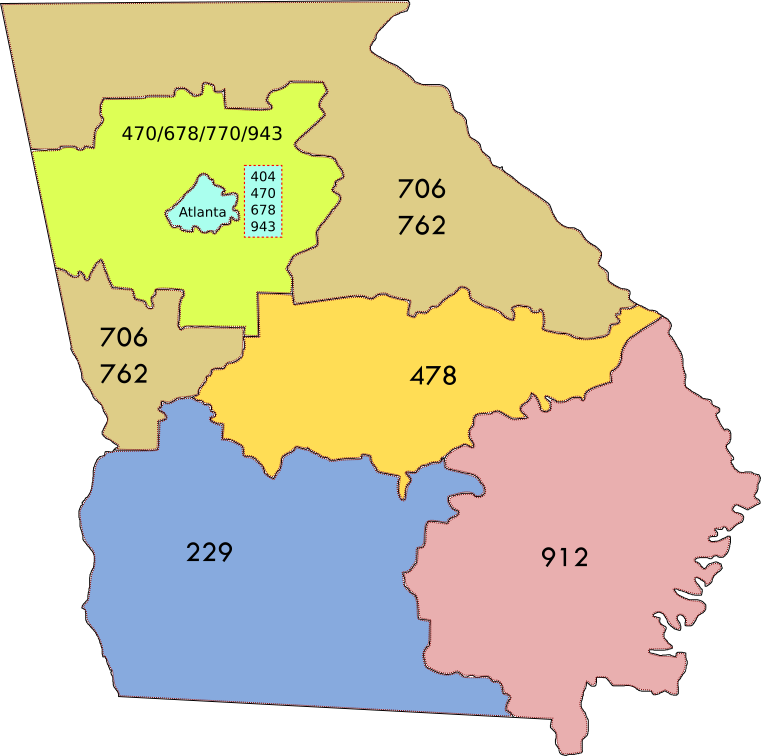

Area codes 706 and 762 are telephone area codes in the North American Numbering Plan (NANP) for the northern and west central parts of Georgia, but excluding metropolitan Atlanta.

The numbering plan area (NPA) is divided into three disconnected geographical regions. A small section is in west-central Georgia, in the region around Columbus. This is bordered by area code 334 to the west in Alabama, area code 478 to the east, area code 229 to the south, and metro Atlanta's 404, 678, 770, and 470. It does not border the landline area of 404, only the cellphone area. Additionally, the Yatesville rate center is in area codes 706 and 762, but not adjacent to any other rate center in 706/762. The Yatesville rate center shares a small border with 770 to the north, but is almost surrounded by 478 to the south, east, and west.

The major section of 706 wraps around from Rome in northwest Georgia, east through the mountains past Dahlonega, meeting its narrowest point at Toccoa, then broadening south to Athens and Augusta. It touches Alabama's area code 256/938 and 334 on the far west, Tennessee's area code 423 on the northwest, North Carolina's area code 828 and Upstate South Carolina's area code 864 to the north-northeast, and midlands area codes 803 and 839 to the east, and middle Georgia's 478 and metro Atlanta as above.

== History ==
When the North American Numbering Plan was created in 1947, the entire state of Georgia was assigned area code 404. On July 1, 1954, the southern portion of the state, from Macon southward, was split off with area code 912. Area code 404 was limited to the northern half of the state, from the Tennessee and North Carolina state lines as far south as Columbus and Augusta. This configuration remained in place for 38 years.

In 1992, almost all of the territory outside the Atlanta area was split off with area code 706. 706 consisted of a horseshoe-shaped region that completely wrapped around the inner ring of Atlanta. It also included a number of southern exurbs of Atlanta. However, the residents of these area objected to no longer being associated with 404. Shortly after 706 commenced service, BellSouth returned several of these areas to the 404 numbering plan area. The boundary was redrawn in such a way that isolated Columbus and the surrounding area from the rest of 706.

BellSouth and the Georgia Public Service Commission recognized that Atlanta's growth still placed heavy demand on 404 numbering resources. They had already planned to introduce 770 as the area code for Atlanta's suburban ring later in the 1990s. However, the return of the southern exurbs forced the GPSC to activated 770 for service in 1995, a few years sooner than planned.

In June 2005, the GPSC announced that 706 had nearly exhausted its capacity of new central office prefixes. On June 24, 2005, the NANPA assigned area code 762 for this purpose. However, the Columbus area was not large enough for its own area code, but was too large to stay in 706. For this reason, it was decided to make 762 an overlay, with permissive dialing allowed on September 3. On April 1, 2007, ten-digit dialing became mandatory in the overlay area.

Despite the rapid growth in 706/762's main section (particularly the northern portion), it is nowhere near exhausting. Projections expected the area to remain in its unusual, non-contiguous state until after 2049.

Prior to 1990, area code 706 was used for dialing parts of the Baja California areas of Mexico from the United States.

== Service area ==
The 706/762 overlay serves the following counties: Banks, Burke (part with area code 478), Chattooga, Catoosa, Chattahoochee, Clarke, Columbia, Dade, Dawson, Elbert, Fannin, Franklin, Floyd, Gilmer, Glascock, Gordon, Greene, Habersham, Hancock, Harris, Hart, Heard, Jackson, Jasper, Jefferson (part with area code 478), Jenkins, Lincoln, Lumpkin, Madison, McDuffie, Meriwether, Morgan, Murray, Muscogee, Oconee, Oglethorpe, Putnam, Rabun, Richmond, Stephens, Talbot, Taliaferro, Towns, Troup, Union, Upson (part with area code 478), Walker, Warren, White, Whitfield, and Wilkes

== See also ==
- List of Georgia area codes
- List of North American Numbering Plan area codes

Georgia area codes: 229, 404, 478, 678/470/943, 706/762, 770, 912
	North: 423	
West: 256/938, 334/483	706/762	East: 821/864
	South: 229, 478	
Alabama area codes: 205/659, 251, 256/938, 334
Tennessee area codes: 423, 615/629, 731, 865, 901, 931
North Carolina area codes: 252, 336/743, 704/980, 828, 910/472, 919/984
South Carolina area codes: 803/839, 843/854, 864/821
