= Area codes 803 and 839 =

Area codes in central South Carolina, United States

Coordinates: 33°45′N 80°54′W

Area codes 803 and 839 are telephone area codes in the North American Numbering Plan (NANP) for the central part of the U.S. state of South Carolina. The numbering plan area (NPA) is anchored by the city of Columbia, the state capital and encompasses the entirety of the Midlands region. It also includes most of the South Carolina portions of the Charlotte, North Carolina and Augusta, Georgia metropolitan areas. 839, an all-service overlay, was approved by the South Carolina Public Service Commission in 2019.

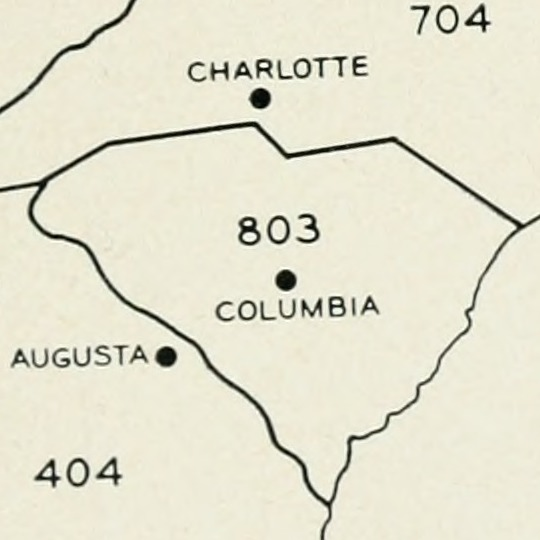
Original numbering plan area 803

Area code 803 is one of the original 86 area codes assigned in 1947, when it was assigned to serve the entire state. It remained the state's sole area code for 48 years.

By the early 1990s, the state's growth, especially in the Upstate, Columbia, the Charlotte suburbs, Charleston and the Grand Strand, made it clear that South Carolina needed another area code. In 1995, the Upstate was split off into a separate numbering plan area with area code 864.

While this was intended as a long-term solution, the continued growth of telecommunication service in Columbia, the Charlotte suburbs, and the Lowcountry demanded further relief within just two years. As a result, in 1998 the Lowcountry was assigned area code 843.

In May 2020, numbering plan area 803 was converted into an overlay plan by adding area code 839 for new central office code assignments. This implementation made ten-digit dialing mandatory in the numbering plan area as of April 2020. A permissive dialing period had been granted since October 2019.

== Service area ==
=== Major cities ===
- Aiken pop. 29,494
- Columbia pop. 133,803
- Rock Hill pop. 74,342
- Sumter pop. 40,524

=== Counties ===
- Richland
- Sumter
- Kershaw
- Fairfield
- Lee
- Clarendon
- Orangeburg
- Calhoun
- Lexington
- Aiken
- Lancaster
- York
- Chester
- Newberry
- Barnwell
- Bamberg
- Edgefield
- Allendale

== See also ==
- List of North American Numbering Plan area codes
- List of South Carolina area codes

South Carolina area codes: 803/839, 843/854, 864/821
	North: 704/980	
West: 821/864, 706/762, 478	803/839	East: 843/854
	South: 478, 912, 843/854	
North Carolina area codes: 252, 336/743, 704/980, 828, 910/472, 919/984
Georgia area codes: 229, 404, 478, 678/470/943, 706/762, 770, 912
