= Area code 606 =

Telephone area code in eastern Kentucky

Kentucky's numbering plan areas and area codes

Area code 606 is a telephone area code in the North American Numbering Plan for the eastern half of south-central and the eastern part of the Commonwealth of Kentucky. Cities and towns in the numbering plan area include Ashland, Morehead, Hazard, Middlesboro, Somerset, Stanford, London, Corbin, Greenup, Paintsville, Pikeville and Maysville. Most of its service area lies within the Kentucky region known as the Eastern Kentucky Coalfield. It runs along the entire length of the state's borders with Virginia and West Virginia.

== History ==
Area code 606 was created in 1954 in a split of the 502 numbering plan area. It initially comprised the entire eastern half of Kentucky, as far west as Lexington and Northern Kentucky, the Kentucky side of the Cincinnati area. Notably, it was one of the first three area codes with "0" as the middle digit that were not assigned to an entire state; the others were area code 507 in Minnesota and area code 607 in New York state.

In 1999, most of the northwestern portion of the old 606 territory, including Lexington and Northern Kentucky, split off with area code 859. Precedent would have had Lexington and Northern Kentucky keep 606, as this was the largest population center in the numbering plan area. Lexington and Northern Kentucky combined accounted for almost two-thirds of the population of the former 606 territory. However, the rural portion of 606 is one of the poorest areas of the nation; 16 of the 100 poorest counties in the nation are in 606. The Kentucky Public Service Commission and BellSouth (now part of AT&T), the dominant service provider in the area at the time, decided to let the rural portion retain 606 to spare residents and businesses the expense and burden of having to change telephone numbers, which would have also required en masse reprogramming of cell phones. Also, 859 on a standard telephone keypad can be translated into "UKY", a reference to the University of Kentucky, the state's flagship institution of higher learning, located in Lexington.

With the great majority of the old 606's landlines and cell phones transferring to 859, the split left 606 as one of the most thinly populated numbering plan areas in the country. As of 2022, it was not projected to exhaust until about 2034.

== See also ==
- List of Kentucky area codes
- List of North American Numbering Plan area codes

Kentucky area codes: 270/364, 502, 606, 859
	North: 326/937, 220/740, 283/513	
West: 859, 270/364	606	East: 304/681, 276
	South: 423, 931	
Ohio area codes: 216, 330/234, 419/567, 440/436, 513/283, 614/380, 740/220, 937/326
Tennessee area codes: 423, 615/629, 731, 865, 901, 931
Virginia area codes: 276, 434, 540/826, 703/571, 757/948, 804/686
West Virginia area codes: 304/681
