= Area codes 864 and 821 =

Area codes in upstate South Carolina, United States

Coordinates: 34°39′N 82°20′W

Area codes 864 and 821 are telephone overlay area codes in the North American Numbering Plan (NANP) for the western third of the U.S. state of South Carolina. The numbering plan area (NPA) comprises the areas of Greenville, Spartanburg, Anderson, and twelve surrounding counties. Other cities in the numbering plan area include Clemson, Gaffney, Greer, and Mauldin. It is largely coextensive with the Upstate region.

Area code 864 was created on December 3, 1995, in a split of numbering plan area 803. Previously, 803 had been South Carolina's sole area code for 48 years, making South Carolina one of the most populated states with a single area code.

Projections of 2021 anticipated the requirement of relief from telephone number exhaustion in the Upstate region with a new area code for 2024 or 2025. On November 28, 2022, the NANP Administrator (NANPA) and the South Carolina Public Service Commission set the in-service date for overlay area code 821 to August 19, 2024, after a permissive dialing period from January 19, 2024, to July 19, 2024. Activations of central office codes for 821 began in November 2024. With this assignment, seven-digit dialing became extinct in South Carolina; 843 and 803 had been overlaid in 2015 and 2020, respectively.

== See also ==
- List of North American Numbering Plan area codes
- List of South Carolina area codes

South Carolina area codes: 803/839, 843/854, 864/821
	North: 828, 704/980	
West: 706/762	864/821	East: 803/839
	South: 706	
North Carolina area codes: 252, 336/743, 704/980, 828, 910/472, 919/984
Georgia area codes: 229, 404, 478, 678/470/943, 706/762, 770, 912
