= Area code 828 =

Area code for western North Carolina, United States

North Carolina area codes

Area code 828 is a telephone area code in the North American Numbering Plan (NANP) for most of the western third of the U.S. state of North Carolina. The numbering plan area (NPA) comprises the Blue Ridge Mountains and most of the Foothills. The largest city is Asheville.

Area code 828 was split from the 704 numbering plan area on March 22, 1998, to provide relief from numbering plan exhaustion brought about by the popularity of pagers and cell phones.

In 2026, with the number of possible phone numbers running out, the North Carolina Utilities Commission approved an overlay for the 828 area code. The proposed overlay code is 451.

== Service area ==
Among the cities and towns in the 828 numbering plan area are: Asheville, Boone, Conover, Hendersonville, Hickory, Lenoir, Marion, Morganton, Murphy, and Newton.

The city of Hickory is often grouped with the Charlotte metropolitan area, but uses 828 rather than Charlotte's area codes 704 and 980.

Other communities include:

- Andrews
- Bakersville
- Banner Elk
- Barnardsville
- Black Mountain
- Blowing Rock
- Bryson City
- Burnsville
- Brevard
- Cashiers
- Columbus
- Cherokee
- Canton
- Dillsboro
- Franklin
- Flat Rock
- Granite Falls
- Hayesville
- Highlands
- Hildebran
- Hot Springs
- Hudson
- Maggie Valley
- Maiden
- Mars Hill
- Marshall
- Newland
- Old Fort
- Qualla
- Robbinsville
- Rosman
- Rutherfordton
- Spruce Pine
- Sylva
- Taylorsville
- Topton
- Valdese
- Waynesville
- Weaverville
- Whittier

== See also ==
- List of North Carolina area codes

North Carolina area codes: 252, 336/743, 704/980, 828, 910/472, 919/984
	North: 423, 336/743	
West: 423, 865	Area code 828	East: 336/743, 704/980,
	South: 706/762, 864/821	
Tennessee area codes: 423, 615/629, 731, 865, 901, 931
South Carolina area codes: 803/839, 843/854, 864/821
Georgia area codes: 229, 404, 478, 678/470/943, 706/762, 770, 912
