= Area code 434 =

Area code for southern Virginia, United States

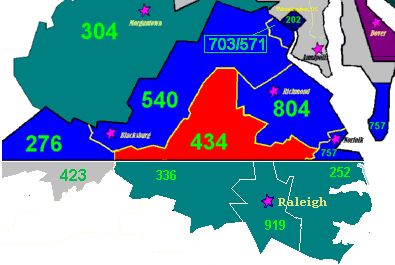
The area colored red indicates the geographical region of Virginia served by area code 434

Area code 434 is a telephone area code in the North American Numbering Plan (NANP) for the south-central area of the Commonwealth of Virginia. Lynchburg is the most populous city in the numbering plan area.

Area code 434 serves the cities of Charlottesville, Lynchburg, Danville, South Boston, and Emporia. The numbering plan area comprises Albemarle County, Fluvanna County, Buckingham County, Nelson County, Amherst County, Appomattox County, Campbell County, Pittsylvania County, Halifax County, Charlotte County, Prince Edward County, Nottoway County, Lunenburg County, Mecklenburg County, Brunswick County, and Greensville County, as well as a portion of Greene County, southwestern Louisa County, eastern Bedford County, southern Cumberland County, southwestern Sussex County, far western Southampton County, southeastern Dinwiddie County, and southern Prince George County.

== History ==
In December 2000, the Virginia State Corporation Commission announced that area code 804 would be split because central office prefixes had been anticipated to be depleted by April 2002. Area code 434 was officially effective as of June 1, 2001, on which date long-distance telephone calls could be made using either area code 804 or 434. After January 15, 2002, telephone calls made to numbers within the region required dialing the correct area code.

== Service area ==
- Altavista
- Amherst
- Appomattox
- Blackstone
- Campbell County
- Charlottesville
- Chase City
- Chatham
- Clarksville
- Concord
- Crewe
- Danville
- Earlysville
- Emporia
- Farmville
- Gretna
- Hurt
- Kenbridge
- Keysville
- Lunenburg
- Lynchburg
- Palmyra
- Prospect
- Ruckersville
- Scottsville
- South Boston
- South Hill
- Stanardsville
- Victoria

== See also ==
- List of Virginia area codes
- List of NANP area codes

Virginia area codes:
	North: 540/826	
West: 276, 540/826	area code 434	East: 804/686, 757/948
	South: 252, 336/743, 919/984	
North Carolina area codes: 252, 336/743, 704/980, 828, 910/472, 919/984
Tennessee area codes: 423, 615/629, 731, 865, 901, 931
