= Area code 276 =

Telephone area code for southwestern Virginia

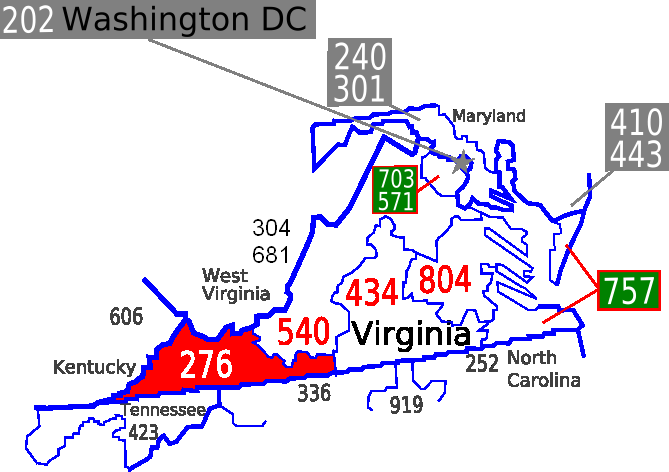
Numbering plan area (red) of area code 276

Area code 276 is a telephone area code in the North American Numbering Plan (NANP) for the southwestern part of the U.S. state of Virginia. It was established by a split of area code 540 on September 1, 2001.

Prior to October 2021, area code 276 had telephone numbers assigned for the central office code 988. In 2020, 988 was designated nationwide as a dialing code for the National Suicide Prevention Lifeline, which created a conflict for exchanges that permit seven-digit dialing. This area code was therefore scheduled to transition to ten-digit dialing by October 24, 2021.

== Service area ==
Within the service area are the following independent cities:

- Bristol
- Galax
- Martinsville
- Norton

The following counties are also located in the numbering plan area:

- Bland
- Buchanan
- Carroll
- Dickenson
- Grayson
- Henry
- Lee
- Patrick
- Russell
- Scott
- Smyth
- Tazewell
- Washington
- Wise
- Wythe

== See also ==
- List of North American Numbering Plan area codes
- List of Virginia area codes

Virginia area codes: 276, 434, 540/826, 703/571, 757/948, 804/686
	North: 304/681, 540	
West: 606	276	East: 434
	South: 336, 423	
North Carolina area codes: 252, 336/743, 704/980, 828, 910/472, 919/984
Tennessee area codes: 423, 615/629, 731, 865, 901, 931
West Virginia area codes: 304/681
