= Index of Virginia-related articles =

The location of the Commonwealth of Virginia in the United States of America

The following is an alphabetical list of articles related to the United States Commonwealth of Virginia.

== 0–9 ==
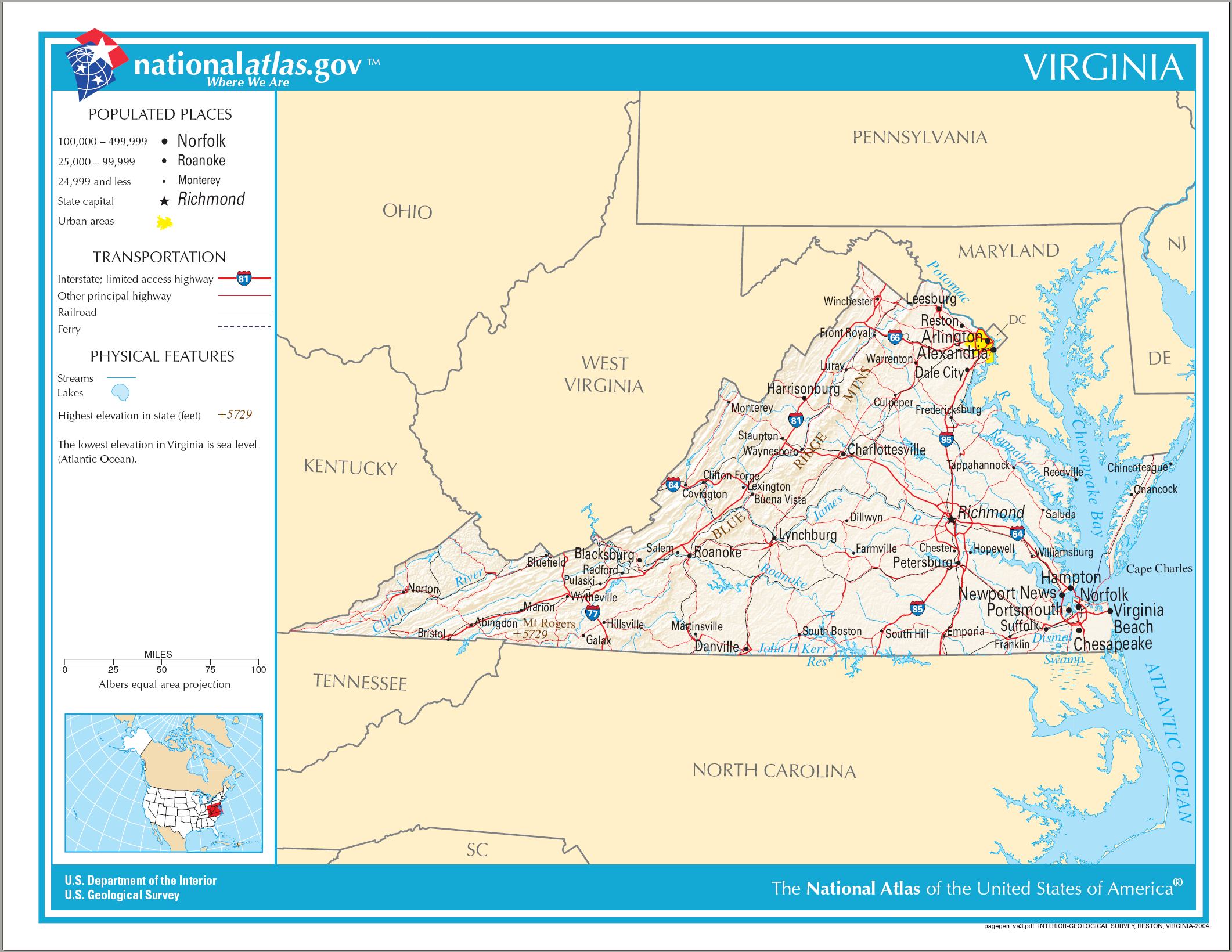
An enlargeable map of the Commonwealth of Virginia

- .va.us – Internet second-level domain for the Commonwealth of Virginia
- 10th State to ratify the Constitution of the United States of America

== A ==
- Abortion in Virginia
- Adjacent states and federal district:
  - Commonwealth of Kentucky
  - District of Columbia
  - State of Maryland
  - State of North Carolina
  - State of Tennessee
  - State of West Virginia
- Agriculture in Virginia
- Airports in Virginia
- Amusement parks in Virginia
- Aquaria in Virginia
  - commons:Category:Aquaria in Virginia
- Arboreta in Virginia
  - commons:Category:Arboreta in Virginia
- Archaeology in Virginia
  - Category:Archaeological sites in Virginia
    - commons:Category:Archaeological sites in Virginia
- Architecture in Virginia
- Area codes in Virginia
- Art museums and galleries in Virginia
  - commons:Category:Art museums and galleries in Virginia
- Astronomical observatories in Virginia
  - commons:Category:Astronomical observatories in Virginia
- Attorney General of the Commonwealth of Virginia

== B ==
- Beaches of Virginia
  - commons:Category:Beaches of Virginia
- Bodleian Plate
- Botanical gardens in Virginia
  - commons:Category:Botanical gardens in Virginia
- Buildings and structures in Virginia
  - commons:Category:Buildings and structures in Virginia

== C ==
An enlargeable map of the 95 counties and 38 independent cities of the Commonwealth of Virginia

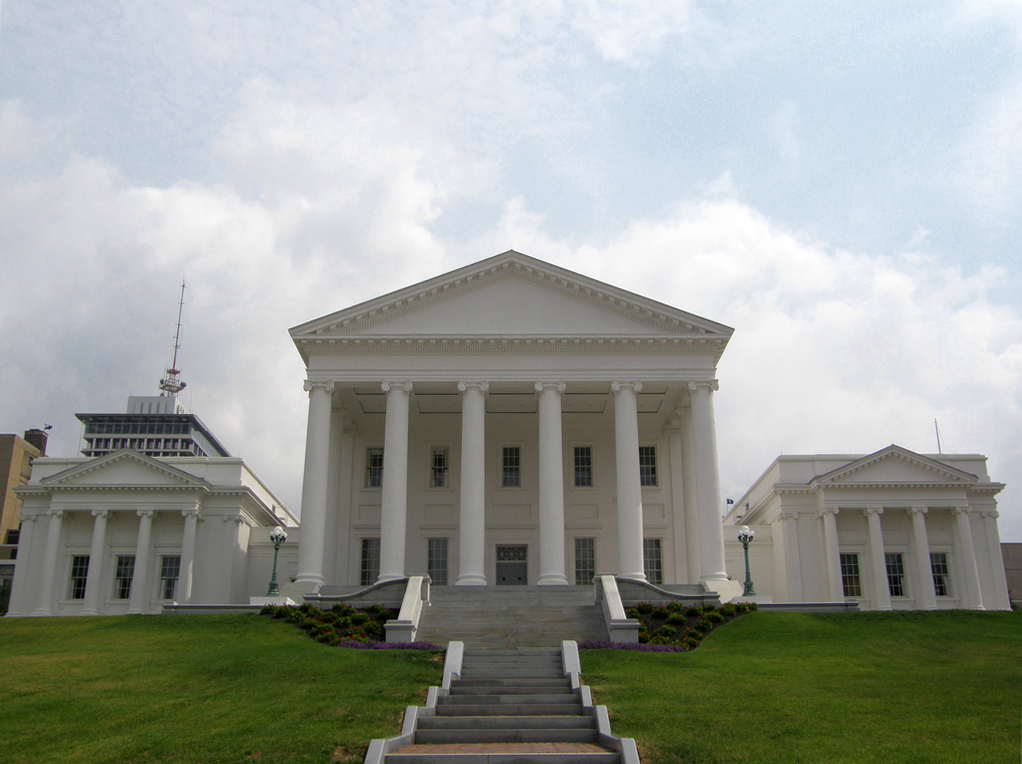
The Commonwealth of Virginia State Capitol in Richmond

- Canyons and gorges of Virginia
  - commons:Category:Canyons and gorges of Virginia
- Capital of the Commonwealth of Virginia
- Capitol of the Commonwealth of Virginia
  - commons:Category:Virginia State Capitol
- Caves of Virginia
  - commons:Category:Caves of Virginia
- Census statistical areas of Virginia
- Chesapeake Bay
- Cities in Virginia
  - commons:Category:Cities in Virginia
- Climate of Virginia
  - Category:Climate of Virginia
    - commons:Category:Climate of Virginia
- Colleges and universities in Virginia
  - commons:Category:Universities and colleges in Virginia
- Commonwealth of Virginia website
  - Constitution of the Commonwealth of Virginia
  - Government of the Commonwealth of Virginia
    - Category:Government of Virginia
      - commons:Category:Government of Virginia
  - Executive branch of the government of the Commonwealth of Virginia
    - Governor of the Commonwealth of Virginia
  - Legislative branch of the government of the Commonwealth of Virginia
    - General Assembly of the Commonwealth of Virginia
      - Senate of the Commonwealth of Virginia
      - House of Delegates of the Commonwealth of Virginia
  - Judicial branch of the government of the Commonwealth of Virginia
    - Supreme Court of the Commonwealth of Virginia
- Communications in Virginia
  - commons:Category:Communications in Virginia
- Companies in Virginia
- Congressional districts of Virginia
- Constitution of the Commonwealth of Virginia
- Convention centers in Virginia
  - commons:Category:Convention centers in Virginia
- Counties of the Commonwealth of Virginia
  - commons:Category:Counties in Virginia
- Culture of Virginia
  - Category:Culture of Virginia
    - commons:Category:Virginia culture

== D ==
- Demographics of Virginia
  - Category:Demographics of Virginia

== E ==
- Economy of Virginia
  - Category:Economy of Virginia
    - commons:Category:Economy of Virginia
- Education in Virginia
  - Category:Education in Virginia
    - commons:Category:Education in Virginia
- Elections in Virginia
  - commons:Category:Elections in Virginia
- Environment of Virginia
  - commons:Category:Environment of Virginia

== F ==
The Flag of the Commonwealth of Virginia

- Festivals in Virginia
  - commons:Category:Festivals in Virginia
- Fictional characters from Virginia
- Flag of the Commonwealth of Virginia
- Forts in Virginia
  - Category:Forts in Virginia
    - commons:Category:Forts in Virginia

== G ==
- General Assembly of the Commonwealth of Virginia
- Geography of Virginia
  - Category:Geography of Virginia
    - commons:Category:Geography of Virginia
  - List of gaps of Virginia
- Geology of Virginia
  - commons:Category:Geology of Virginia
- Ghost towns in Virginia
  - Category:Ghost towns in Virginia
    - commons:Category:Ghost towns in Virginia
- Golf clubs and courses in Virginia
- Government of the Commonwealth of Virginia website
  - Category:Government of Virginia
    - commons:Category:Government of Virginia
- Governor of the Commonwealth of Virginia
  - List of governors of Virginia
- Great Seal of the Commonwealth of Virginia

== H ==
- High schools of Virginia
- Higher education in Virginia
- Highway system of Virginia
- Hiking trails in Virginia
  - commons:Category:Hiking trails in Virginia
- Historic houses in Virginia
- History of Virginia
  - Historical outline of Virginia
    - Category:History of Virginia
      - commons:Category:History of Virginia
- Hospitals in Virginia
- Hot springs of Virginia
  - commons:Category:Hot springs of Virginia
- House of Delegates of the Commonwealth of Virginia

== I ==
- Images of Virginia
  - commons:Category:Virginia
- Islands of Virginia

== J ==
- Jamestown, Virginia, colonial capital 1619-1698

== L ==
- Lake Matoaka
- Lakes in Virginia
  - Category:Lakes of Virginia
    - commons:Category:Lakes of Virginia
- Landmarks in Virginia
  - commons:Category:Landmarks in Virginia
- Lesser Seal of the Commonwealth of Virginia
- Lieutenant Governor of the Commonwealth of Virginia
- Lists related to the Commonwealth of Virginia:
  - List of airports in Virginia
  - List of census statistical areas in Virginia
  - List of cities in Virginia
  - List of colleges and universities in Virginia
  - List of United States congressional districts in Virginia
  - List of counties in Virginia
  - List of forts in Virginia
  - List of gaps of Virginia
  - List of ghost towns in Virginia
  - List of governors of Virginia
  - List of high schools in Virginia
  - List of historic houses in Virginia
  - List of hospitals in Virginia
  - List of individuals executed in Virginia
  - List of islands of Virginia
  - List of lakes in Virginia
  - List of law enforcement agencies in Virginia
  - List of lieutenant governors of Virginia
  - List of museums in Virginia
  - List of National Historic Landmarks in Virginia
  - List of newspapers in Virginia
  - List of people from Virginia
  - List of primary state highways in Virginia
  - List of radio stations in Virginia
  - List of railroads in Virginia
  - List of Registered Historic Places in Virginia
  - List of rivers of Virginia
  - List of school districts in Virginia
  - List of secondary state highways in Virginia
  - List of state forests in Virginia
  - List of state parks in Virginia
  - List of state prisons in Virginia
  - List of symbols of the Commonwealth of Virginia
  - List of telephone area codes in Virginia
  - List of television stations in Virginia
  - List of towns in Virginia
  - List of Virginia's congressional delegations
  - List of United States congressional districts in Virginia
  - List of United States representatives from Virginia
  - List of United States senators from Virginia
- Former counties, cities, and towns of Virginia

== M ==
- Maps of Virginia
  - commons:Category:Maps of Virginia
- Mass media in Virginia
- Monuments and memorials in Virginia
  - commons:Category:Monuments and memorials in Virginia
- Mountains of Virginia
  - commons:Category:Mountains of Virginia
- Museums in Virginia
  - Category:Museums in Virginia
    - commons:Category:Museums in Virginia
- Music of Virginia
  - Category:Music of Virginia
    - commons:Category:Music of Virginia
  - Category:Musical groups from Virginia
  - Category:Musicians from Virginia

== N ==
- National forests of Virginia
  - commons:Category:National Forests of Virginia
- Natural arches of Virginia
  - commons:Category:Natural arches of Virginia
- Natural history of Virginia
  - commons:Category:Natural history of Virginia
- Newport News, Virginia
- Newspapers of Virginia

== O ==
- Outdoor sculptures in Virginia
  - commons:Category:Outdoor sculptures in Virginia

== P ==
- The Pentagon
- People from Virginia
  - Category:People from Virginia
    - commons:Category:People from Virginia
    - Category:People from Virginia by era
    - Category:People from Virginia by populated place
    - Category:People from Virginia by county
    - Category:People from Virginia by occupation
    - Category:Fictional characters from Virginia
- Poet Laureate of Virginia
- Politics of Virginia
  - Category:Politics of Virginia
    - commons:Category:Politics of Virginia
- Potomac River
- President’s House (College of William & Mary)
- Primary state highways in Virginia
- Protected areas of Virginia
  - commons:Category:Protected areas of Virginia

== R ==
- Radio stations in Virginia
- Railroad museums in Virginia
  - commons:Category:Railroad museums in Virginia
- Railroads in Virginia
- Registered historic places in Virginia
  - commons:Category:Registered Historic Places in Virginia
- Religion in Virginia
  - Category:Religion in Virginia
    - commons:Category:Religion in Virginia
- Richmond, Virginia, state capital since 1780, CSA capital 1861-1865
- Rivers of Virginia
  - commons:Category:Rivers of Virginia

== S ==
- School districts of Virginia
- Scouting in Virginia
- Seals of the Commonwealth of Virginia
- Secondary state highways in Virginia
- Senate of the Commonwealth of Virginia
- Settlements in Virginia
  - Cities in Virginia
  - Towns in Virginia
  - Census Designated Places in Virginia
  - Other unincorporated communities in Virginia
  - List of ghost towns in Virginia
- Sports in Virginia
  - Category:Sports in Virginia
    - commons:Category:Sports in Virginia
  - Category:Sports venues in Virginia
    - commons:Category:Sports venues in Virginia
- State Capitol of Virginia
- State of Virginia – see: Commonwealth of Virginia
- State parks of Virginia
  - commons:Category:State parks of Virginia
- State prisons of Virginia
- Structures in Virginia
  - commons:Category:Buildings and structures in Virginia
- Supreme Court of the Commonwealth of Virginia
- Symbols of the Commonwealth of Virginia
  - Category:Symbols of Virginia
    - commons:Category:Symbols of Virginia

== T ==
- Telecommunications in Virginia
  - commons:Category:Communications in Virginia
- Telephone area codes in Virginia
- Television shows set in Virginia
- Television stations in Virginia
- Tennessee Valley Authority
- Theatres in Virginia
  - commons:Category:Theatres in Virginia
- Tourism in Virginia website
  - commons:Category:Tourism in Virginia
- Towns in Virginia
  - commons:Category:Cities in Virginia
- Transportation in Virginia
  - Category:Transportation in Virginia
    - commons:Category:Transport in Virginia

== U ==
- United States of America
  - States of the United States of America
  - United States census statistical areas of Virginia
  - Virginia's congressional delegations
  - United States congressional districts in Virginia
  - United States Court of Appeals for the Fourth Circuit
  - United States District Court for the Eastern District of Virginia
  - United States District Court for the Western District of Virginia
  - United States representatives from Virginia
  - United States senators from Virginia
- Universities and colleges in Virginia
  - commons:Category:Universities and colleges in Virginia
- US-VA – ISO 3166-2:US region code for the Commonwealth of Virginia

== V ==
- VA – United States Postal Service postal code for the Commonwealth of Virginia
- Virginia website
  - Category:Virginia
    - commons:Category:Virginia
      - commons:Category:Maps of Virginia
- Virginia Association of Communication Arts and Sciences (VACAS))
- Virginia Beach, Virginia
- Virginia Community Corps
- Virginia Petroleum Convenience and Grocery Association
- Virginia Philosophical Association
- Virginia Press Women Inc
- Virginia State Board of Censors
- Virginia State Capitol
- Virginia state elections, 1999
- Virginia State Route 846 (Loudoun County)

== W ==
- Washington-Arlington-Alexandria, DC-VA-MD-WV Metropolitan Statistical Area
- Washington-Baltimore-Northern Virginia, DC-MD-VA-WV Combined Statistical Area
- Water parks in Virginia
- Waterfalls of Virginia
  - commons:Category:Waterfalls of Virginia
  Wikimedia
  - Wikimedia Commons:Category:Virginia
    - commons:Category:Maps of Virginia
  - Wikinews:Category:Virginia
    - Wikinews:Portal:Virginia
  - Wikipedia Category:Virginia
    - Wikipedia Portal:Virginia
    - Wikipedia:WikiProject Virginia
      - Category:WikiProject Virginia articles
      - Category:WikiProject Virginia participants
- Williamsburg, Virginia, colonial and state capital 1698-1780
- Williamsburg Bray School

== Z ==
- Zoos in Virginia
  - commons:Category:Zoos in Virginia

== See also ==
- Virginia
- Outline of Virginia
