= Area codes 336 and 743 =

Area codes for northwestern and north-central North Carolina, United States

North Carolina Area Codes

Area codes 336 and 743 are telephone overlay area codes in the North American Numbering Plan (NANP) for most of north-central and northwestern North Carolina, including the Piedmont Triad region and portions of the northern Foothills and northern Mountains. Area code 336 was created in an area code split of area code 910 on December 15, 1997, and 743 was added to the same numbering plan area (NPA) on October 24, 2015.

== History ==
Officials from the North Carolina Utilities Commission announced on August 20, 2014, that 336 would be overlaid with a new area code, 743. The new area code would require 10-digit dialing for local calls, although no long-distance charges would be applied within the 336 territory. Those who already had 336 numbers kept them, easing the burden of having to change phone numbers.The new area code was to be used primarily for issuing new numbers, and was needed because 336 was projected to be exhausted sometime in 2016. The activation of 743 broke seven-digit dialing throughout the I-85 Corridor in North Carolina; Charlotte (704/980) and the Triangle (919/984) had already been overlaid.

Permissive dialing began on October 24, 2015, and continued until April 23, 2016, when ten-digit dialing became mandatory. The first numbers with a 743 area code were issued in May 2016.

== Service area ==
This list includes only the larger communities and is not exhaustive. For cities with more than one ZIP code, only the central ZIP code is given.

- Archdale (27263)
- Asheboro (27203)
- Burlington (27215)
- Clemmons (27012)
- Eden (27288)
- Elkin (28621)
- Graham (27253)
- Greensboro (27401)
- High Point (27260)
- Jefferson (28640)
- Kernersville (27284)
- King (27021)
- Lewisville (27023)
- Lexington (27292)
- Madison (27025)
- Mayodan (27027)
- Mebane (27302)
- Mocksville (27028)
- Mount Airy (27030)
- Oak Ridge (27310)
- Pilot Mountain (27041)
- Reidsville (27320)
- Roxboro (27573)
- Rural Hall (27045)
- Sparta (28675)
- Stokesdale (27357)
- Stoneville (27048)
- Summerfield (27358)
- Thomasville (27360)
- Trinity (27370)
- West Jefferson (28694)
- Wilkesboro (28697)
- Winston-Salem (27101)
- Yadkinville (27055)
- Yanceyville (27379)

== See also ==
- List of North Carolina area codes
- List of North American Numbering Plan area codes

North Carolina area codes: 252, 336/743, 704/980, 828, 910/472, 919/984
	North: 276, 434	
West: 828, 423	336/743	East: 919/984
	South: 704/980, 910/472	
Virginia area codes: 276, 434, 540/826, 703/571, 757/948, 804/686
Tennessee area codes: 423, 615/629, 731, 865, 901, 931
