= List of Tennessee area codes =

The U.S. state of Tennessee is divided into six geographically distinct numbering plan areas (NPAs) in the North American Numbering Plan (NANP) which are serviced by a total of eight area codes.

Area code	Year created	Parent NPA	Overlay	Numbering plan area
901	1947	–	–	Memphis
615	1954	901	615/629	Greater Nashville, including Murfreesboro, Mount Juliet
629	2015	615	615/629	Greater Nashville, including Murfreesboro, Mount Juliet
931	1997	615	–	Clarksville, Columbia, Manchester, Cookeville
423	1995	615	423/729	Chattanooga, Johnson City, Kingsport, Bristol
729	2025	423	423/729	Chattanooga, Johnson City, Kingsport, Bristol
865	1999	423	–	Knoxville
731	2001	901	–	Jackson, Dyersburg, Union City

== See also ==
- List of North American Numbering Plan area codes
