= Area codes 410, 443, and 667 =

Telephone area codes for east Maryland

Maryland's area codes highlighted in red and blue

Area codes 410, 443, and 667 are telephone area codes in the North American Numbering Plan (NANP) for the eastern part of the U.S. state of Maryland. The numbering plan area (NPA) was created with area code 410 in an area code split of area code 301 in 1991, and includes the Baltimore metropolitan area and the Eastern Shore. The three area codes are overlay codes for the numbering plan area, with 443 and 667 added in 1997 and 2012, respectively.

== History ==
In 1947, the American Telephone and Telegraph Company (AT&T) published the first configuration of a nationwide telephone numbering plan for Operator Toll Dialing, which designated the state of Maryland as a numbering plan area and assigned area code 301. Despite the state being home to two large metropolitan areas, Baltimore and the Maryland suburbs of Washington, D.C. (area code 202), the state received only one area code. This made Maryland one of the most-populous states to be served by a single area code. By the late 1980s, the rapid growth of the Baltimore and Washington suburbs, as well as the proliferation of fax machines and pagers placed the numbering resources in the danger of exhaustion of central office prefixes.

The number shortage problem was exacerbated by the use of area code 202 as a de facto overlay for the inner ring of the Washington metro area, even though it was split between three area codes–301, 202, and Northern Virginia's 703. This was accomplished via a system of central office code protection in which no central office code was duplicated in multiple area codes in the region. Each existing central office code was routed with each area code in the region so that each telephone number in the region could be dialed with any of the regional area codes. The consequence was that the full capacity of central office prefixes could not be used for each involved area code.

The office code protection ended in 1990, but it soon became apparent that this would not free up enough prefixes to meet demand. By the fall of 1990, it was apparent that Maryland needed another area code. In November 1990, a plan for a second area code, 410, was announced, that would be assigned to the Baltimore metropolitan area and the Eastern Shore, while western and southern Maryland, including the Washington suburbs, would retain area code 301. Bell Atlantic (now Verizon), the largest telephone provider in the region, allowed the western part of the state to retain 301 to keep the large number of federal agencies on the Maryland side of the Washington area from having to change telephone numbers. On the other side of the Potomac River, many of the same factors resulted in most of the old 703 territory outside of Northern Virginia split off as area code 540 in 1995. While Maryland would have needed a second area code at some point due to rapid growth in the Washington and Baltimore suburbs, it is very likely that the immediate need for another area code would have been staved off had it been possible to assign more 301 numbers to the Baltimore area before 1990.

Area code 410 officially entered service on October 6, 1991; it was initially implemented in a permissive-dialing phase, with ten-digit dialing for local calls across the new 301/410 boundary. The split largely followed metro lines. However, slivers of Anne Arundel and Carroll counties, as well as much of western Howard County, stayed in 301 even though these counties reckoned as part of the Baltimore area. Conversely, slivers of Frederick County, a Washington exurb, switched to 410. (Note: Four counties were split between area code 301 and 410.: Anne Arundel County was assigned area code 410, except Laurel exchanges 210, 317, 490, 497, 498, 596, 604, 725, and 778, Marlboro exchange 952, and Fort Meade exchange 677.; Carroll County was assigned area code 410, except Mount Airy exchange 829 remained area code 301.; Howard County was assigned area code 410, except Mount Airy exchange 829 and Laurel exchanges 210, 317, 490, 497, 598, 604, 725, and 776 remained area code 301.; Frederick County remained area code 301, except Union Bridge exchange 775 and New Windsor exchange 635 was assigned 410.) Effective November 1, 1991, ten-digit dialing was required when calling a different area code in Maryland.

Although the split was intended to be a long-term solution, within five years 410 was already close to exhaustion due to the proliferation of cell phones and pagers, particularly in and around Baltimore. To solve this problem, area code 443 was overlaid onto the 410 territory on July 1, 1997. A month earlier, area code 240 was overlaid onto the western half of the state, including the Washington area. Overlays were a new concept at the time, and had met resistance because of the requirement for ten-digit dialing. However, Verizon advocated that an overlay would be less expensive to implement than splits that would have forced 1.2 million people to change their numbers. Additionally, a split would have forced residents of either Baltimore or the Eastern Shore to change their numbers for the second time in a decade.

By 2011, the 410/443 area was once again running out of numbers because of the continued proliferation of cell phones. To spare residents another number change to a new area code, a third overlay code, area code 667, was implemented on March 24, 2012. This assigned 24 million numbers to just over four million people. Based on current projections, a fourth area code will not be required in the region until about 2030.

== Coverage ==
The counties served by these area codes include:

In the Baltimore metropolitan area:

- All of Baltimore and Baltimore County, Calvert and Harford counties
- Most of Anne Arundel, Carroll and Howard counties
- A small portion of eastern Frederick County

All of Maryland's Eastern Shore:

- Caroline County
- Cecil County
- Dorchester County
- Kent County
- Queen Anne's County
- Somerset County
- Talbot County
- Wicomico County
- Worcester County

== Notes ==
Maryland area codes: 301/240/227, 410/443/667
| | North: 223/717, 484/610/835 | |
| West: 227/240/301 | 410/443/667 | East: 302, Atlantic Ocean |
| | South: 757/948 | |
Delaware area codes: 302
Pennsylvania area codes: 215/267/445, 412, 570/272, 610/484/835, 717/223, 724, 814/582, 878
Virginia area codes: 276, 434, 540/826, 703/571, 757/948, 804/686
