= Patterson, Virginia =

Patterson, Virginia may refer to the following places in Virginia:

- Patterson, Buchanan County, Virginia
- Patterson, Wythe County, Virginia
