= Area codes 301, 240, and 227 =

North American telephone area codes in Western Maryland, U.S.

Maryland consists of the red and blue areas. The red area has area codes 227, 240 and 301.

Area codes 301, 240, and 227 are telephone area codes in the North American Numbering Plan (NANP) for the western part of the U.S. state of Maryland. The numbering plan area (NPA) comprises Maryland's portion of the Greater Washington, D.C. metro area, portions of southern Maryland, along with rural western Maryland. This includes the communities of Cumberland, Frederick, Hagerstown, Gaithersburg, Potomac, Germantown, Bethesda, Rockville, Landover, Silver Spring, and Waldorf.

Area code 301 was the first area code for all of Maryland, from 1947, when the area code system was created, until 1991, when everything from Baltimore eastward was split off as area code 410. In 1997, area code 240 was added as an overlay area code for the 301 territory. On June 14, 2023, a third overlay code, 227, was added to provide more central office prefixes for new telephone numbers.

== History ==
Area code 301 was one of the original North American area codes when the American Telephone and Telegraph Company (AT&T) established a new, nationwide telephone numbering plan in 1947. The area code served the entire state of Maryland.

Much of the Washington metropolitan area is part of a local calling area which is centered on the District's area code 202, and also extends into the suburban area in southern Maryland with 301 and Northern Virginia with area code 703. From 1947 to 1990, it was possible to dial any other telephone number in the metro area as a local call with only seven digits, not using an area code, irrespective of the home area code. The entire metro area was also reachable via long-distance services by dialing area code 202, for which purpose AT&T had established cross-referenced operator routing codes for all affected central offices. This was implemented via a system of central office code protection, meaning that no central office code in the metro area could exist in more than a single central office. For example, if 202-574 numbers were in use in the District or 703-574 numbers were in use in Northern Virginia, the corresponding 301-574 numbering block could only be assigned in areas considered a safe distance away from the capital, such as the Eastern Shore of Maryland.

=== Ten-digit dialing ===
By the end of the 1980s, the Washington metropolitan area was running out of assignable prefixes for new central offices on both sides of the Potomac River. The only unassigned prefixes were unavailable due to the central office code protection that maintained seven-digit dialing in the metro-area. Assignment of these prefixes would require dialing an area code. The three local operating companies of the Chesapeake and Potomac Telephone Company (C&P Telephone, later part of Bell Atlantic and now Verizon) cooperated in ending code protection for the Washington area on October 1, 1990. Ten-digit dialing was now required for all local calls between Maryland, the District of Columbia, and Virginia. Area code 202 was no longer usable for suburban points. Local calls within Maryland did not require the area code. Permissive dialing using the old dialing procedures continued from April 1 through October 1, 1990.

=== 410-split ===
Due to the overall growth of the Baltimore–Washington metropolitan area, it became apparent by the end of the 1980s that terminating central office code protection in the Washington area could not free up sufficient resources north of the Potomac River to stave off the immediate need for a new area code.

In mitigation action, Baltimore and the Eastern Shore were split off as a new numbering plan area with area code 410 on November 1, 1991. The area code split largely followed metropolitan area lines with a few exceptions. While Howard County is often recognized as part of the Baltimore metropolitan area, a small portion of the county remained in 301, while the rest of the county was reassigned to 410.

When an area code is split, the largest city in the old numbering plan area (in this case Baltimore) typically retains the existing area code to minimize expense for changing telephone numbers. However, Bell Atlantic opted to leave the western half of the state in 301 to spare the large number of federal agencies on the Maryland side of the Washington area from the expense and disruption of a new area code. While Maryland would have likely needed another area code due to the growth of the Baltimore-Washington corridor, it is likely that a split would have been delayed had more 301 numbers been available for use in Baltimore.

=== 240-overlay ===
Although the area code split was intended as a long-term solution, within four years 301 was close to exhaustion due to the proliferation of cell phones and pagers, especially in the Washington suburbs. In relief action, area code 240 was introduced on June 1, 1997, to form the state's first overlay. Overlays were a new concept at the time, and met with some resistance due to the requirement for ten-digit dialing. A month later, area code 443 was assigned as an overlay for the eastern half of the state. Verizon felt overlays would be less expensive than splits that would have forced 1.2 million people to change their numbers. At the time, it was predicted that it would take until 2008 to exhaust area code 240.

=== 227-overlay ===
A September 2022 study projected that the 301/240 numbering plan area (NPA) would suffer central office code exhausted between April and June 2023. Area code 227 was already approved as an all-services distributed overlay since January 3, 2001 for the 301/240 NPA. The new area code went into service on June 14, 2023, at which time activation of new central office codes could begin, once all assignable central office codes in 240/301 had been exhausted.

== Service area ==
The numbering plan area 301/240/227 includes all of Allegany, Charles, Garrett, Montgomery, Prince George's, St. Mary's and Washington counties, most of Frederick County, (Note: Four counties were split between area code 301 and 410.: In Anne Arundel County, Laurel exchanges 210, 317, 490, 497, 498, 596, 604, 725, and 778 and Marlboro exchange 952 remained area code 301. The rest of the county was assigned area code 410.; In Carroll County Mount Airy exchange 829 remained area code 301. The rest of the county was assigned area code 410.; In Howard County, Mount Airy exchange 829 and Laurel exchanges 210, 317, 490, 497, 598, 604, 725, and 776 remained area code 301. The rest of the county was assigned area code 410.; Most of Frederick County remained area code 301. Only Union Bridge exchange 775 and New Windsor exchange 635 were assigned area code 410.) western Howard County, and slivers of southwestern Carroll County and western Anne Arundel County.

Local calls require ten-digit dialing (area code + number, leading "1" is not required). Some areas, such as Rockville, Gaithersburg, Upper Marlboro, Bethesda and Landover in Maryland remain a local call to the District and Northern Virginia.

== Notes ==
Maryland area codes: 301/240/227, 410/443/667
	North: 717/223, 412/724/878, 814/582	
West: 202/771, 304/681, 540/826, 703/571	area codes 301/240/227	East: 410/443/667
	South: 804/686, 304/681	
District of Columbia area codes: 202/771
Pennsylvania area codes: 215/267/445, 412, 570/272, 610/484/835, 717/223, 724, 814/582, 878
Virginia area codes: 276, 434, 540/826, 703/571, 757/948, 804/686
West Virginia area codes: 304/681
