= List of Georgia area codes =

The U.S. state of Georgia is divided into seven numbering plan areas in the North American Numbering Plan (NANP), which are served by ten area codes.

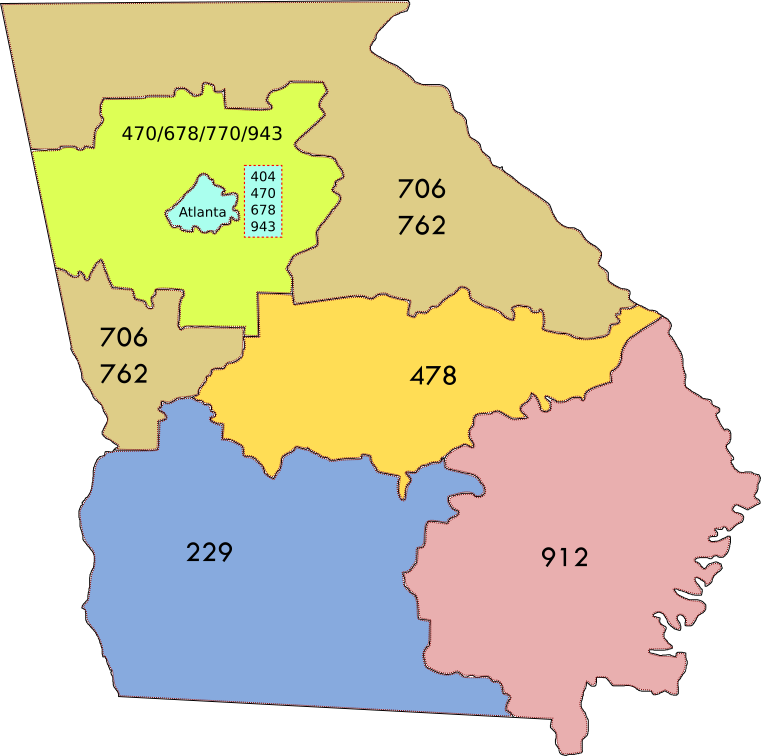

Area code	Year created	Parent NPA	Overlay	Numbering plan area
404	1947	–	404/470/678/943	Atlanta and immediate environs (central Fulton and DeKalb counties)
770	1995	404	470/678/770/943	Central north Georgia surrounding the Atlanta metro area
678	1998	404/770	404/470/678/943; 470/678/770/943	Central north Georgia including the Atlanta metro area
470	2001	404/678/770	404/470/678/943; 470/678/770/943	Central north Georgia including the Atlanta metro area
943	2022	404/470/678/770	404/470/678/943; 470/678/770/943	Central north Georgia including the Atlanta metro area
706	1992	404	706/762	Columbus (west-central Georgia); Rome, Dahlonega, Toccoa, Athens and Augusta (northwest, northeast, upper east-central Georgia)
762	2006	706	706/762	Columbus (west-central Georgia); Rome, Dahlonega, Toccoa, Athens and Augusta (northwest, northeast, upper east-central Georgia)
912	1954	404	–	Savannah, Reidsville, Vidalia, Waycross, Brunswick, Douglas, and coastal Georgia
229	2000	912	–	Southwest Georgia (Albany, Thomasville, Valdosta, Tifton, Cairo, Fitzgerald, Americus)
478	2000	912	–	central Georgia, comprising Macon, Forsyth, Fort Valley, Warner Robins, Dublin, Eastman, Milledgeville

In 1947, Georgia was a single numbering plan area (NPA) with area code 404. In 1954, 912 was assigned to its southern and central areas.

The state operated with two area codes until May 3, 1992, when area code 706 was created for the two separate areas outside of the metro Atlanta area. Due to complaints from exurban residents who were to be reassigned to 706, they remained in 404. At that time, these areas were part of what was already the world's largest toll-free local calling zone; previously many were only able to call the adjacent telephone exchanges on the edge of metro Atlanta.

Area code 770 was assigned to Atlanta's suburbs just three years later, in August 1995, requiring ten-digit dialing. All mobile phones kept 404. Area code 678 was assigned to both the city and its suburbs in January 1998, becoming the first overlay area code in the state.

The Georgia Public Service Commission decided that a three-way split of 912 would occur after that, with area code 229 and 478 being applied to southwest Georgia and central Georgia in August 2000. Area code 470 became the second area code to overlay Atlanta in September 2001. It remained unused until 2010. In September 2005, area code 762 was overlaid to area code 706.

In March 2022, area code 943, went into service as another area code for the Atlanta area. Usage projections in 2024 suggested that 229 and 912 will require relief before 2030. In May 2025, area code 565 was announced for a future overlay in NPA 912.

== See also ==
- "Area Code Maps". North American Numbering Plan Administrator.
