= Telephone numbers in Georgia =

Telephone numbers in Georgia may refer to:

- Telephone numbers in Georgia (U.S. state)
- Telephone numbers in Georgia (country)
