= VCC =

VCC may refer to:

== Organizations ==
=== Companies ===
- ValueVision Channel, the previous name of ShopNBC
- Velsicol Chemical Corporation, Illinois, US
- Volvo Cars, a Swedish automobile manufacturer

=== Colleges ===
- Vale of Catmose College, an arts college in England
- Valencia Community College, in Orlando, Florida
- Valor Christian College, in Columbus, Ohio
- Vancouver Career College, in British Columbia, Canada
- Vancouver Community College, a vocational training institute in Vancouver, British Columbia, Canada
- Vista Community College, in California

=== Other organizations ===
- Vaccine Choice Canada, an anti-vaccination organization
- Vancouver Chamber Choir, in Vancouver, British Columbia, Canada
- Ventura County Council, a Boy Scouts of America local council in California, US
- Veteran Car Club of Great Britain, a vintage motor racing club in England
- Vineyard Church of Columbus, in Ohio, US
- Virginia Community Corps, an AmeriCorps state program in Virginia, US
- Volunteer Cadet Corps, the Royal Naval Cadets and Royal Marines Cadets of the UK's Royal Navy

== Science and technology ==
- Voltage common collector (V_{CC}), an IC power-supply pin and collector supply line voltage in an NPN circuit
- Virtual credit card, a virtual credit card number typically used for online purchases
- Voice call continuity, a specification for mobile phone service
- Video Compact Cassette, an early name for Philips' Video 2000 videocassette format
- Virtual collective consciousness, in behavioral science
- Virtual colony count, an antibacterial assay
- Vehicle Control Center, a SelTrac rail signalling system from Thales Rail Signalling Solutions

== Other uses ==
- Vancouver Convention Centre, a convention centre in Vancouver, British Columbia, Canada
- Vatican City Championship, association football league in Vatican City
- Viewer's Choice Canada, a video on-demand service
- Volvo Cross Country (disambiguation), several vehicles sold by AB Volvo
- Voorburg Cricket Club, in Voorburg, the Netherlands
