= Area codes 757 and 948 =

Telephone area codes for southeastern Virginia, United States

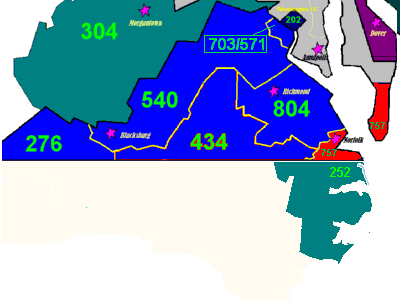
The area colored red indicates the southeast corner of Virginia served by area code 757

Area codes 757 and 948 are telephone area codes in the North American Numbering Plan (NANP) in Virginia. They serve the Hampton Roads metropolitan area and the Eastern Shore of the state. Area code 757 was established July 1, 1996 in an area code split of area code 804. Area code 948 was established on February 5, 2020 forming an overlay complex with 757.

The service area comprises the Eastern Shore of Virginia, i.e. the Virginia portion of the Delmarva Peninsula, and the vast majority of the Hampton Roads metropolitan area, which includes the Virginia Peninsula with Newport News, Hampton, and Williamsburg, and Poquoson, and South Hampton Roads, with Virginia Beach, Norfolk, Chesapeake, Portsmouth, Franklin, and Suffolk.

== History ==
Before the implementation of number pooling, area code 757 was projected to run out of numbers as early as 2002. A plan was developed that would have created a concentrated overlay in the Hampton Roads metro area leaving all of the Eastern Shore in 757. This would have made ten-digit dialing mandatory in southeastern Virginia. However, this plan was never implemented.

In 2019, area code 757 was projected to exhaust its numbering resources by late 2021, triggering planning for mitigation of central office code exhaustion, and the announcements of planning for an overlay complex, and the selection of area code 948 in 2020. An overlay was chosen over the option of splitting 757. A split could have meant Virginia Beach, Chesapeake, and Norfolk, for example, retaining 757 and the rest of the area changing to 948, or vice versa. The NANPA decided, and the State Corporation Commission agreed, that simply requiring everyone to dial ten digits instead of seven would have caused far fewer problems than the inconveniences that would be caused by an area code split. In March 2022, Verizon set an activation date of April 9, 2022, with area code 948 officially taking effect on May 9. This made ten-digit dialing mandatory in 757/948.

== In popular culture ==
"757" is commonly used as a general geographic descriptor for the Hampton Roads and Virginia Peninsula region. The Hampton Roads Chamber and the Virginia Peninsula Chamber of Commerce have recommended its use in tourism branding.

== See also ==
- List of North American Numbering Plan area codes
- List of Virginia area codes

Virginia area codes: 276, 434, 540/826, 703/571, 757/948, 804/686
	North: 804/686, 410/443/667	
West: 434	757	East: Atlantic Ocean
	South: 252	
Maryland area codes: 301/240/227, 410/443/667
North Carolina area codes: 252, 336/743, 704/980, 828, 910/472, 919/984
