= Patterson, Buchanan County, Virginia =

Unincorporated community in Virginia, United States

Patterson, Virginia
- Unincorporated community
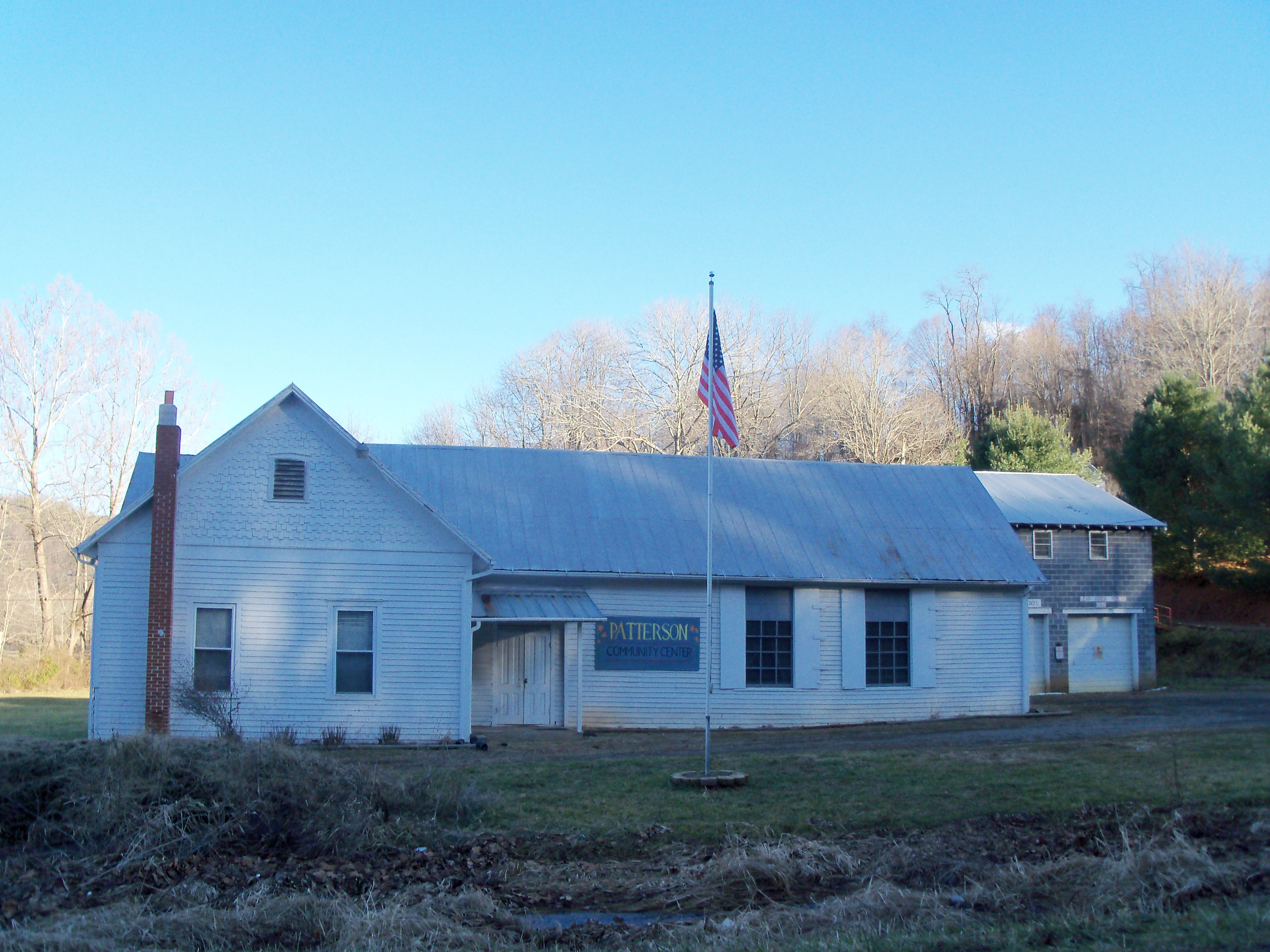
- Patterson Community Center

- Location within Virginia Location within the United States
- Coordinates: 37°15′52″N 81°58′33″W
- Country: United States
- State: Virginia
- County: Buchanan
- Elevation: 1,516 ft (462 m)
- Time zone: UTC-5 (Eastern (EST))
  - Summer (DST): UTC-4 (EDT)
- Area code: 276
- GNIS feature ID: 1497077

Patterson is an unincorporated community in Buchanan County, Virginia, United States. Patterson is located on State Route 641, 6.8 miles (10.9 km) east of Grundy. Patterson had a post office from September 11, 1936, to July 27, 1991.

The Patterson post office was established in 1936. The community was named for the Patterson brothers.
