= Patterson, Wythe County, Virginia =

Patterson, Virginia
- Unincorporated community
- Location within Virginia Location within the United States
- Coordinates: 36°53′26″N 80°47′06″W
- Country: United States
- State: Virginia
- County: Wythe
- Elevation: 1,978 ft (603 m)
- Time zone: UTC-5 (Eastern (EST))
  - Summer (DST): UTC-4 (EDT)
- Area code: 276
- GNIS feature ID: 1495085

Patterson is an unincorporated community in Wythe County, Virginia, United States. Patterson is located along Virginia State Route 100, 17 miles (27 km) east-southeast of Wytheville.
