= List of North Carolina area codes =

North Carolina area codes

The area codes in the state of North Carolina are as follows:

- 252 - North Coastal Plain region in the northeast corner of the state, containing the Outer Banks (split of 919 in 1998)
- 910 / 472 - South Coastal Plain region in the southeast corner of the state, including Wilmington (split of 919 in 1993; 472 created as an overlay beginning on October 7, 2022)
- 336 / 743 - Piedmont Triad and the northwest Piedmont region (336 created in 1997 as a split of 910; 743 created as an overlay in 2015)
- 828 - Western & Mountainous region of the state (split of 704 in 1998)
- 919 / 984 - The Research Triangle metropolitan region (919 created in 1954 in a split of 704; 984 created as an overlay on April 30, 2012)
- 704 / 980 - Charlotte metropolitan area (704 created in 1947 as the only area code for North Carolina; 980 created as an overlay in 2001)

== See also ==
- List of North American Numbering Plan area codes
- "Area Code Maps". North American Numbering Plan Administrator.
