= List of South Carolina area codes =

Numbering plan areas and area codes of South Carolina

The state of South Carolina is divided into three geographically distinct numbering plan areas (NPAs) in the North American Numbering Plan (NANP), each served by an area code overlay of two area codes each.

Area code	Year created	Parent NPA	Overlay	Numbering plan area
803	1947	–	803/839	Central South Carolina (Midlands), including Columbia
839	2020	803	803/839	Central South Carolina (Midlands), including Columbia
864	1995	803	821/864	Northwest South Carolina (Upstate)
821	2024	864	821/864	Northwest South Carolina (Upstate)
843	1998	803	843/854	Eastern and coastal South Carolina (Lowcountry)
854	2015	843	843/854	Eastern and coastal South Carolina (Lowcountry)
