= Virginia Philosophical Association =

The Virginia Philosophical Association (VPA) is a philosophical organization dedicated to promoting the study of philosophy in Virginia. The association sponsors an annual meeting at a Virginia college or university.
