= Area code 865 =

Area code for Knoxville, Tennessee

Numbering plan area 865, highlighted in red

Area code 865 is a telephone area code in the North American Numbering Plan (NANP) serving Knoxville, Tennessee, and the nine surrounding counties (Anderson, Blount, Grainger, Jefferson, Knox, Loudon, Roane, Sevier, and Union), as well as small portions of six other counties (Campbell, Cumberland, Hancock, Meigs, Monroe, and Rhea) in central East Tennessee. The area incorporates most of the region defined as the Knoxville-Sevierville-La Follette Combined Statistical Area.

Cities in the numbering plan area include Knoxville, Alcoa, Bean Station, Clinton, Gatlinburg, Harriman, Jefferson City, Kingston, Lenoir City, Maryville, Maynardville, Norris, Oak Ridge, Pigeon Forge, Plainview, Rockwood, Rutledge, Sevierville and Townsend.

== History ==
When the first configuration of the area code system was published in 1947, area code 901 was assigned as the sole area code for Tennessee. In 1954, the numbering plan area was restricted to West Tennessee, while everything east of the Tennessee River received the new area code 615.

This division remained in place for 41 years, until area code 423 was created as the area code for most of East Tennessee, with 615 restricted to Middle Tennessee. The state's three area codes were now roughly coextensive with the Grand Divisions of Tennessee.

This was intended as a long-term solution. However, within only three years, 423 had already grown to exhaustion levels that required mitigation, due to the proliferation of cell phones and pagers. With the prospect of 423 being exhausted by 1999, it soon became apparent that East Tennessee needed another area code, even though this would have forced some residents to change their numbers for the second time in a decade.

Numbering plan area 423 was split on November 1, 1999. Permissive dialing of 423 continued throughout East Tennessee until April 24, 2000. Normally, the most established city or area involved in an area code split would retain the existing area code, but in this relief action, the Tennessee Regulatory Authority requested that the Knoxville area be assigned new area code 865. 865 translates to VOL, an abbreviation of "Volunteer", the official nickname for the Tennessee Volunteers at the University of Tennessee. During relief planning, it was decided that the Tri-Cities were not large enough for their own area code, but were too large to follow Knoxville into 865. This left the Tennessee Regulatory Authority with two options, either turn 865 into an overlay complex for all of East Tennessee, or map two non-contiguous sections of 423. Overlays were a new concept at the time, and met with some resistance due to the need for ten-digit dialing. The Regulatory Authority chose the second option. This resulted in 423 becoming one of the few non-contiguous area codes in the country; 865 is almost entirely surrounded by the two sections of 423.

On October 24, 2021, area code 865 was transitioned to ten-digit dialing, despite not being part of an overlay numbering plan, in which multiple area codes are assigned to a numbering plan area. The area code had telephone numbers assigned for the central office code 988. In 2020, 988 was designated nationwide as a dialing code for the National Suicide Prevention Lifeline, which created a conflict for exchanges that still permitted seven-digit dialing.

Tennessee area codes: 423, 615/629, 731, 865, 901, 931
| | North: 423 | |
| West: 931 | area code 865 | East: 423, 828 |
| | South: 423 | |
North Carolina area codes: 252, 336/743, 704/980, 828, 910/472, 919/984
