= Virginia Press Women Inc =

Virginia Press Women (VPW) is an organization of professional communicators in Virginia that is open to women and men. Members work for newspapers, magazines, radio, television stations, schools, colleges, government, corporations, non-profit agencies, communications businesses, and a variety of organizations and associations.

== Founding ==
VPW was founded in Richmond in 1958 as an organization for newspaper editors and writers. The constitution was amended one year later to extend membership to "any writer actively engaged in journalistic services for remuneration". Charter members included Norma Lugar, Agnes Cooke and Lib Wiley. In 1973, VPW was incorporated and membership was opened to men who support the mission of VPW.

== Mission ==
The purpose of this organization shall be to promote the highest ideals in journalism, to provide exchange of journalistic ideas and experiences, to offer continuing educational opportunities to members and to serve the public's right to know.

== Affiliations ==
National Federation of Press Women (NFPW)

== Activities ==
- Communicator of Achievement, annual award, the group's highest honour for members.
- Newsmaker of the Year, awarded annually to a woman with ties to Virginia who has "made to news" over the past year or has had outstanding newsworthy accomplishments for many years.
- Communications Contest, open to members in a number of categories, entries must have been published during the calendar year immediately preceding each annual contest. First-place entries are entered in the communications contest of the NFPW.
- Annual meeting, fall of each year, which typically includes workshops and/or presentations on communication topics.
- Awards meeting, spring of each year, which typically also includes professional development workshops.

== Virginia Press Women Foundation ==
Incorporated separately as a 501(c)3 corporation with the purpose of administering and raising funds for college scholarships.
