= List of Virginia area codes =

The Commonwealth of Virginia is divided into six geographically distinct numbering plan areas (NPAs) in the North American Numbering Plan (NANP) with a total of 10 area codes.

Area code	Year	Parent NPA	Overlay	Numbering plan area
703	1947	–	571/703	Northern Virginia, including the cities of Alexandria, Fairfax, and Falls Church as well as Arlington, Fairfax, Prince William, and Loudoun counties
571	2000	703	571/703	Northern Virginia, including the cities of Alexandria, Fairfax, and Falls Church as well as Arlington, Fairfax, Prince William, and Loudoun counties
804	1973	703	686/804	Eastern Central Virginia the Northern Neck, and the Middle Peninsula including Mechanicsville, Petersburg, and Richmond
686	2024	804	686/804	Eastern Central Virginia the Northern Neck, and the Middle Peninsula including Mechanicsville, Petersburg, and Richmond
540	1995	703	540/826	Central and North including Fredericksburg, Roanoke, Warrenton, and Winchester
826	2022	540	540/826	Central and North including Fredericksburg, Roanoke, Warrenton, and Winchester
757	1996	804	757/948	Hampton Roads region and Southeast corner including Hampton, Newport News, Williamsburg, Virginia Beach, Norfolk, Chesapeake, Portsmouth, and the Eastern Shore on the Delmarva Peninsula
948	2022	757	757/948	Hampton Roads region and Southeast corner including Hampton, Newport News, Williamsburg, Virginia Beach, Norfolk, Chesapeake, Portsmouth, and the Eastern Shore on the Delmarva Peninsula
276	2001	540	–	Southwest corner of the state, including Bristol, Galax, Martinsville, and Wytheville
434	2001	804	–	South central area including Charlottesville and Lynchburg

== See also ==
- "Area Code Maps". North American Numbering Plan Administrator.
