= Area codes 919 and 984 =

Area codes in North Carolina, United States

North Carolina area codes

Area codes 919 and 984 are telephone area codes in the North American Numbering Plan (NANP) for all or parts of eleven counties in the east-central area of the U.S. state of North Carolina. They service the cities of Raleigh, Durham, Cary, and Chapel Hill/Carrboro, and the surrounding suburban areas of the Research Triangle metropolitan area, as well as the outlying towns and nearby rural areas of Oxford to the north, Sanford to the south, Goldsboro to the southeast, and Mebane to the west.

Area code 919 was created in 1954 in a split of numbering plan area 704, the original area code serving the entire state. After successive splits in the 1990s, the final numbering plan area received a second area code, 984, in 2012 to form an overlay complex.

== History ==
When area codes were first assigned in 1947, all of North Carolina was assigned area code 704. In 1954, the eastern and central portions of the state—everything from Winston-Salem eastward—split off as area code 919. 704 was reduced to Charlotte and all points west.

Despite North Carolina's growth in the second half of the 20th century, this configuration remained in place for 39 years. In 1993, the western and southern portions of the numbering plan area, including Winston-Salem, Greensboro, Fayetteville and Wilmington, were split off to form area code 910. However, a sliver of Alamance County around Mebane stayed in 919. This was because portions of eastern Mebane are in Orange County, almost all of which stayed in 919. BellSouth drew the new 919-910 boundary in order to preserve seven-digit dialing throughout Mebane.

In 1998, 919 was cut back to its present size when the northeastern portion, including Rocky Mount, Greenville and New Bern, was split off to form area code 252.

Area code 919 was initially slated for overlay with area code 984 in 2001, but due to the implementation of number pooling, the overlay was deferred when the supply of numbers was deemed sufficient for the near term. Within a decade, however, the Triangle's continued growth and the proliferation of cellular telephones and pagers meant that the implementation of 984 could no longer be delayed. In September 2011, the North Carolina Utilities Commission commenced the implementation, with a permissive dialing period for local calls from October 1, 2011 to March 31, 2012, when ten-digit dialing became mandatory across the Triangle region. The effective date of the overlay was April 30, 2012.

As a result of the ten-digit dialing conversion, incorrect dialing of 919 by customers resulted in thousands of wrong number calls to 9-1-1.

Despite the Triangle's continued growth, 919/984 is far from exhaustion. Projections in 2019 have no exhaust date for 919/984, meaning that the Triangle will not need another area code for at least 30 years.

== Service area ==
Counties

- Alamance (small portion in northeast, most of county is in 336/743)
- Chatham (except small portion in northwest which is in 336/743)
- Duplin (north-central portion, most of county is in 910)
- Durham
- Franklin (except portion in northwest, which is in 252)
- Granville
- Harnett (most of west and north is 919/984, rest of county is 910/472)
- Johnston
- Orange (except a sliver along the northern border, which is in 336/743)
- Person (small portion in northeast, most of county is in 336/743)
- Wake
- Wayne (except sliver in southeast which is in 252)
- Lee

Major cities and towns

- Raleigh
- Durham
- Cary
- Chapel Hill
- Apex
- Carrboro
- Clayton
- Fuquay-Varina
- Garner
- Goldsboro
- Holly Springs
- Mebane
- Morrisville
- Sanford
- Smithfield

== See also ==
- List of North Carolina area codes

North Carolina area codes: 252, 336/743, 704/980, 828, 910/472, 919/984
	North: 434	
West: 336 / 743	919 / 984	East: 252
	South: 910	
Virginia area codes: 276, 434, 540/826, 703/571, 757/948, 804/686
