= Virginia Community Corps =

Virginia Community Corps (VCC) was an AmeriCorps state program housed within the Virginia Department of Social Services. Between October 2003 and September 2008, Virginia Community Corps worked to advance the mission of the Virginia Department of Social Services by serving communities and families in need. Members worked to promote self-sufficiency for low-income families, improve access to high quality service and mobilize other volunteers in the community VCC was ended in September 2009 due to state budget cuts.

== Members ==
AmeriCorps Members serving in Virginia Community Corps were placed with local departments of social services and non-profit community action agencies. These local offices and community action agencies served as host sites for the members. Host sites were responsible for supervision, performance measurement, and member development. Members served in Virginia Community Corps for a one-year period and completed 1700 service hours for full-time members and 900 service hours for part-time members. During their service, members received a stipend, or living allowance. Additionally, full-time members were eligible for health insurance. After completing their service hours, members received an education award that can be used to fund future education or pay off student loans

== Funding ==
Virginia Community Corps was funded through the Governor's Commission on Community and National Service. Each host site provided a cash match for their member.
