= South Carolina Public Service Commission =

State government agency of South Carolina

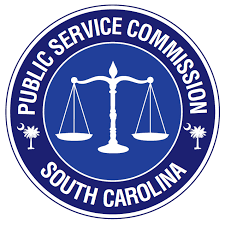
- Seal

Commission overview
- Formed: February 11, 1935
- Jurisdiction: Government of South Carolina
- Headquarters: 101 Executive Center Dr, Suite 100, Columbia, South Carolina
- Website: Official website

The South Carolina Public Service Commission (PSC) is a regulatory agency that regulates public utilities in the state of South Carolina, including electric power, telecommunications, natural gas, and water & wastewater. In addition, the PSC regulates common carriers, including motor carriers of household goods and taxicabs. The PSC also regulates the transportation of companies that provide hazardous waste disposal. The headquarters of the PSC is in the state's capital, Columbia.

== List of Commissioners ==
Commissioner	District	Tenure		Notes
Guy Butler	3	1963	1998	
Rudolph Mitchell	At-Large	1973	1998	
Cecil A. Bowers	5	1982	1998	
Warren D. Arthur, IV	5	1991	1998	
C. Dukes Scott	2	1994	1999	
Scott Elliott	2	1999	2000	
Phillip Bradley	4	1994	2002	
William Saunders	1	1994	2004	
James Blake Atkins	2	2000	2004	
Nick Theodore	4	2002	2004	
H. Clay Carruth, Jr.	5	1998	2004	
C. Bob Moseley	At-Large	1998	2008	
Mignon L. Clyburn	6	1998	2009	
David A. Wright	2	2004	2013	
Randy Mitchell	3	1998	2013	
Brent L. McGee	2	2013	2014	
Nikiya Hall	6	2010	2017	
Robert T. Bockman	6	2017	2018	
Elizabeth B. Fleming	4	2004	2018	
Elliot Elam, Jr.	2	2014	2019	
O'Neal Hamilton	7	2004	2020	
Comer H. Randall	3	2013	2020	
John E. Howard	1	2004	2020	
Swain E. Whitfield	5	2008	2020	Reelected in March 2026.
Thomas J. Ervin	4	2018	2024	
Carolyn Williams	1	2020	2026	
Headen B. Thomas	5	2020	2026	
Justin T. Williams	6	2018	Present	Chairman until June 2028
Florence P. Belser	2	2019	Present	Served as Chairman (July 2022 – June 2024)
Eugene Hennelly	1	2026	Present	
Delton W. Powers	7	2020	Present	Served as Chairman (July 2024-June 2026)
Swain Whitfield	5	2026	Present	
Stephen M. Caston	3	2020	Present	
H. David Britt	4	2025	Present	Current Vice Chair (June 2026)
