= Area code 252 =

Area code in northeastern North Carolina, United States

North Carolina numbering plan areas

Area code 252 is a telephone area code in the North American Numbering Plan (NANP) for the northeastern portion of the U.S. state of North Carolina. The numbering plan area comprises the municipalities of Kinston, Elizabeth City, Greenville, Henderson, Kitty Hawk, New Bern, Roanoke Rapids, Rocky Mount, Morehead City, Warrenton and Wilson. The area code was created on March 22, 1998, in a split of area code 919.

== See also ==
- List of North Carolina area codes
- List of North American area codes

North Carolina area codes: 252, 336/743, 704/980, 828, 910/472, 919/984
	North: 434, 757/948	
West: 919 / 984	252	East: Atlantic Ocean, 441
	South: 910	
Virginia area codes: 276, 434, 540/826, 703/571, 757/948, 804/686
Bermuda area codes: 441
