= Local call =

Term used to describe telephone calls

In telephony, the term local call has the following meanings:

1. Any call using a single switching center; that is, not traveling to another telephone network;
2. A call made within a local calling area as defined by the local exchange carrier;
3. Any call for which an additional charge, i.e., toll charge, is not billed to the calling or called party, or (depending on the country) for which this charge is reduced because it is a short-distance call (e.g. within a town or local metropolitan area).

Typically, local calls have shorter numbers than long-distance calls, as the area code may not be required. However, this is not true in parts of the United States and Canada that are subject to overlay plans or many countries in Europe that require closed dialing plans.

Toll free (e.g. "800" numbers in the United States) are not necessarily local calls; despite being free to the caller, any charge due for the distance of the connection is charged to the called party.

Commercial users who make or accept many long-distance calls to or from a particular distant place may make them as local calls by use of a foreign exchange service. Such an "FX" line also allows people in the distant place to call by using a telephone number local to them.

== See also ==
- Local access and transport area
- Local telephone service
- Trunk vs. Toll
