= Area code 770 =

Area code in Georgia, United States

Coordinates: 34.03853°N 84.34311°W

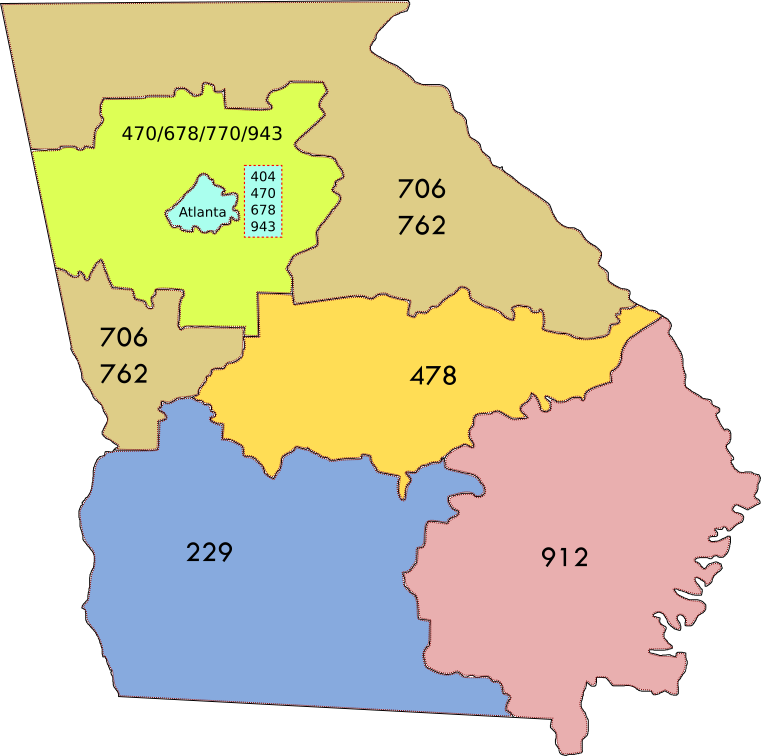
All numbering plan areas in Georgia

Area code 770 is a telephone area code in the North American Numbering Plan (NANP) serving all or part of 29 counties in North Georgia, including most of Atlanta's suburbs. It was created in 1995 in a split of numbering plan area (NPA) 404.

== History ==
When the North American Numbering Plan was created in October 1947, all of Georgia was served by area code 404. In 1954, 404 was reduced to the northern half of the state, with Macon and points south splitting off as area code 912. The remaining 404 territory remained unchanged until 1992, when most of the area outside of the immediate Atlanta metropolitan area was split off with area code 706. This was intended as a long-term solution to relieve number shortages in exchanges in North Georgia.

When 706 was created, it included several fast-growing exurbs of Atlanta. Residents of these areas complained about no longer being associated with the better-known area code 404, prompting BellSouth to return these areas to 404 soon after the split. However, even before the creation of 706, 404 was close to exhaustion due to the proliferation of cell phones, fax machines, and pagers in the fast-growing Atlanta area. BellSouth and the Georgia Public Service Commission were well aware of this, and had already planned to create a new area code for the Atlanta suburbs later in the decade. However, the restoration of the exurban areas from 706 forced further relief action sooner than anticipated.

As a result, just three years later, in 1995, almost all of Atlanta's suburban ring was split off as area code 770.

Atlanta was the first city in the United States to have mandatory ten-digit dialing throughout its metro area, roughly coinciding with the 1996 Summer Olympics in Atlanta. Atlanta was used as the test case not only for its size, but also because it enjoyed the world's largest fiber optic bundle at the time (five times that of New York), and it was home to BellSouth (now part of AT&T), then the Southeastern Regional Bell Operating Company.

An additional NPA was added to both metro Atlanta overlay areas in 2022. Area code 943 entered service on March 15, 2022.

== Service area ==
Numbering plan area 770 surrounds 404. The two areas are separated roughly by Interstate 285, known locally as the Perimeter. Generally, 770 includes most of the metro area outside the Perimeter, while 404 serves Atlanta and most suburbs inside the Perimeter. A few cities are divided between the two area codes. Both codes are overlaid by 470, 678, and 943. The metro Atlanta region (404, 770, 678/470/943) is one of the largest local calling areas in the United States; with few exceptions, no long-distance charges are applied for calls within the metro area. Parts of 706/762 and north Alabama's 256/938 are local calls to Atlanta as well.

When the Atlanta area was divided in 1995, most cellphones stayed with 404, which balanced the fact that most of the landline area went to 770.

Area code 770 serves a numbering plan area that comprises the counties of Barrow, Bartow, Butts, Carroll, Cherokee, Clayton (part with area code 404), Cobb, Coweta, Dawson, DeKalb (part with area code 404), Douglas, Fayette, Forsyth, Fulton (part with area code 404), Gwinnett, Hall, Haralson, Heard (part with area codes 706 and 762), Henry, Lamar, Meriwether (part with area codes 706 and 762), Newton, Oconee, Paulding, Pike, Polk, Rockdale, Spalding, and Walton.

== See also ==
- List of Georgia area codes
- List of North American Numbering Plan area codes
- Metro Atlanta

Georgia area codes: 229, 404, 478, 678/470/943, 706/762, 770, 912
| | North: 706/762 | |
| West: 256/938 | 770 | East: 706/762 |
| | South: 478, 706/762 | |
Alabama area codes: 205/659, 251, 256/938, 334
