= Area code 478 =

Telephone area code for central Georgia, United States

Coordinates: 32.84145°N 83.64921°W

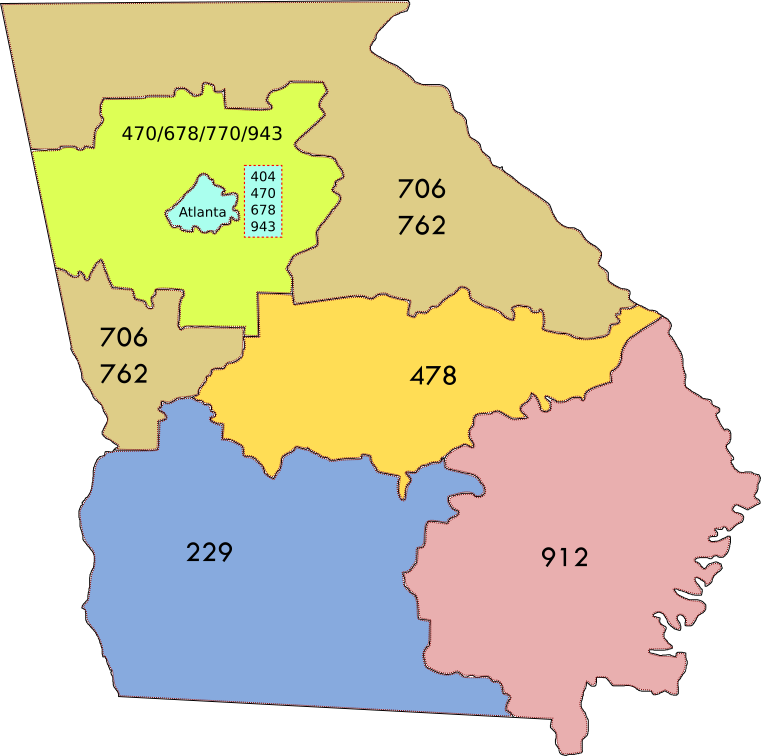

Area code 478 is a telephone area code serving part of the state of Georgia, in the United States. It covers Macon and central Georgia (Warner Robins, Swainsboro, Wadley, Milledgeville, Hawkinsville, Eastman, Cochran, Dublin, Perry). It was formerly part of area code 912. The new area code, along with area code 229 (for Southwestern Georgia), became effective in 2001 in a 3-way split.

Prior to October 2021, area code 478 had telephone numbers assigned for the central office code 988. In 2020, 988 was designated nationwide as a dialing code for the National Suicide Prevention Lifeline, which created a conflict for exchanges that permit seven-digit dialing. This area code was therefore scheduled to transition to ten-digit dialing by October 24, 2021.

== Counties served ==
Baldwin, Bibb, Bleckley, Burke (part with area codes 706 and 762), Crawford, Dodge (part with area code 229), Dooly (part with area code 229), Emanuel (part with area code 912), Houston, Jefferson (part with area codes 706 and 762), Jenkins, Johnson, Jones, Laurens, Macon, Monroe, Peach, Pulaski (part with area code 229), Taylor, Twiggs, Upson (part with area codes 706 and 762), Washington, and Wilkinson.

== See also ==
- "Area Code Maps". North American Numbering Plan Administrator.
- List of exchanges from AreaCodeDownload.com, 478 Area Code

Georgia area codes: 229, 404, 478, 678/470/943, 706/762, 770, 912
	North: 706/762, 404/770/678	
West: 706/762	Area code 478	East: 803/839
	South: 229, 912	
South Carolina area codes: 803/839, 843/854, 864/821
