= Area code 404 =

Telephone area code in Atlanta, Georgia

Coordinates: 33.75449°N 84.38966°W

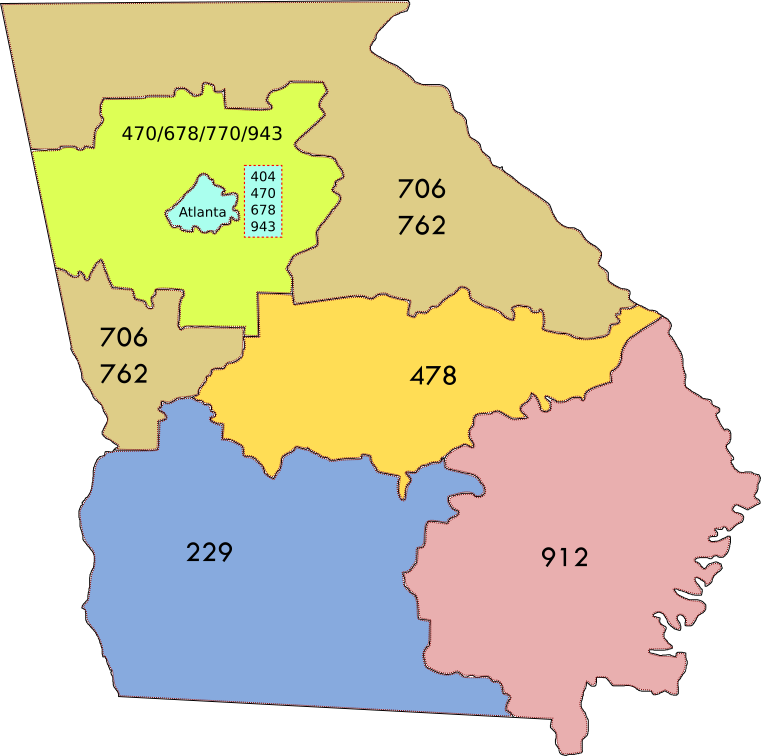

Area code 404 is a telephone area code in the North American Numbering Plan (NANP) for Atlanta, Georgia, and its closest suburbs. This comprises roughly the area encircled by Interstate 285. It is an enclave area code, surrounded by area code 770, which serves most of Metropolitan Atlanta. Both 404 and 770 are overlaid by area codes 678, 470, and 943.

== History ==
Area code 404 was created in 1947 as one of the 86 original North American area codes, serving the entire state of Georgia. On July 1, 1954, the area from Macon southward was split off with area code 912. Numbering plan area 404 was reduced to the northern half of the state, from the Tennessee and North Carolina borders as far south as Columbus and Augusta.

Despite Atlanta's growth in the 1970s and 1980s, 404 remained unchanged for 38 years. By the end of the 1980s, 404 was nearing exhaustion of central office prefixes to assign new telephone numbers. In an effort to delay splitting the numbering plan area, Southern Bell (later BellSouth, now part of AT&T Inc.) introduced interchangeable central office codes, effective October 1, 1989. Previously, the 404 numbering plan served 640 central offices, but the addition of interchangeable codes increased its capacity to 792 central offices in the numbering plan area. As a result, north Georgia telephone subscribers were forced to dial the full ten-digit number (area code plus number).

By late 1991, it became apparent that a new area code was the only way to meet growing demand. On May 3, 1992, nearly all of the old 404 territory outside of metro Atlanta was split off with area code 706. It originally comprised a horseshoe-shaped region that completely wrapped around Atlanta's inner ring. However, shortly after the split took effect, residents in several fast-growing exurbs of Atlanta that had been transferred to 706 complained about no longer being associated with 404. As a result, BellSouth returned these areas to 404 in the spring of 1993. The 404/706 boundary change left Columbus and its surrounding area separated from the rest of 706.

BellSouth and the Georgia Public Service Commission knew that 404 was still close to exhaustion even after the creation of 706 due to the growing proliferation of cell phones, fax machines and pagers. Indeed, the GPSC had anticipated that the Atlanta area would eventually need another area code, and had planned to assign 770 to Atlanta's suburbs later in the decade. However, the decision to return the Atlanta exurbs to 404 forced the GPSC to shift nearly all of Atlanta's suburban ring to 770 on August 1, 1995, sooner than had been planned.

The 404/770 boundary roughly follows Interstate 285, locally known as "the Perimeter." Generally, 404 is Atlanta itself and most suburbs inside the Perimeter (such as Decatur), while most of the metro area outside the Perimeter uses 770. The boundary was drawn in such a way that a number of areas are split between the two codes. For some time after the 770 split, 404 continued to be used for all cellphones in metro Atlanta. 404/770 became one of the six pairs of "doughnut area codes".

The 1995 split was intended as a long-term solution for what had become one of the largest local calling areas in the country. However, within two years, 404 was facing exhaustion again within due to demand and growth in communication services in Atlanta, particularly the continued proliferation of cellphones and pagers. On January 1, 1998, area code 678 was introduced as an overlay for both area codes 404 and 770. Since then, ten-digit dialing has been mandatory throughout metro Atlanta. Because area codes cannot be dedicated to specific services, such as cellphones only, mobile customers throughout the metro area were given the option of choosing numbers in the 404, 770, and 678 area codes when signing up for service.

Within only two years, a fourth area code was needed for metro Atlanta. On September 2, 2001, area code 470, chosen by the Georgia Public Service Commission, was added to the 678 overlay. Assignment of new central office prefixes for the new area code were not permitted before the exhaustion of 678. This was finally delayed until c. 2010, because of the implementation of number pooling.

Telephone numbers for high-capacity lines, such as for contest lines for radio stations, are assigned with the central office prefix 741. When 770 was split, these numbers continued to work as both 404-741-xxxx and as 770-741-xxxx, so that only seven-digit dialing was necessary. That lasted until 678 came into use. There are also other prefixes that are not assigned to just one exchange, such as 499 and 528 used by Cobb County government and formerly Southern Polytechnic State University. These were moved into NPA 770.

In November 2013, the NANPA announced the exhaustion of available number blocks for area code 404, citing significant population growth in Atlanta.

An additional NPA, 943, was added to both metro Atlanta overlay areas, which commenced service on March 15, 2022.

== Service area ==
Area code 404 serves landline wire centers and cellphone exchanges in portions of Clayton, DeKalb and Fulton counties, as well as cellphones in portions of Cobb, Douglas and Gwinnett counties. All are shared with 770. The entire area is shared with 678/470/943.

The metro Atlanta region (404, 770, 678/470/943) is one of the largest local calling areas in the United States; with few exceptions, no long-distance charges are applied for calls from one portion of the metro to the other. Parts of 706/762 and north Alabama's 256/938 are local calls to Atlanta as well.

== See also ==
- List of Georgia area codes
- List of North American Numbering Plan area codes

Georgia area codes: 229, 404, 478, 678/470/943, 706/762, 770, 912
	North: 470/678/943/770	
West: 470/678/943/770	404; 470/678/943	East: 470/678/943/770
	South: 470/678/943/770	
