= Area codes 703 and 571 =

Telephone area codes for Northern Virginia, United States

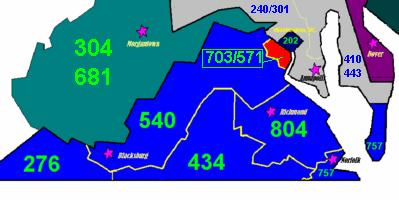
The red-colored area is the northern region of the Commonwealth of Virginia served by area code 703 and its overlay code 571.

Area codes 703 and 571 are telephone area codes in the North American Numbering Plan (NANP) for Northern Virginia, including the independent cities of Alexandria, Fairfax, Falls Church, Manassas, and Manassas Park, as well as all of Arlington and Fairfax counties and parts of Fauquier, Loudoun, and Prince William counties. Area code 703 was created as one of the eighty-six original North American area codes in October 1947, and originally served the entire Commonwealth of Virginia. Area code 571 was created on March 1, 2000, to form an overlay plan with 703.

== History ==
On June 24, 1973, area code 703 underwent its first split, when the eastern portion of the state became area code 804. Permissive dialing of 703 continued across the Commonwealth until January 1, 1974. 703 was restricted to the northern and western regions of Virginia—from Arlington in the north to the Tennessee and Kentucky border—while everything from Danville eastward was reassigned to 804. Normal practice calls for the largest city in the original numbering plan area to retain the old area code during a split. However, C&P Telephone wanted to spare the large number of federal agencies in Northern Virginia the expense and burden of having to change their numbers. A similar decision was made almost two decades later when Maryland's area code 301 was split; Baltimore and points east were assigned to area code 410 in order to allow federal agencies on the Maryland side of the metro to keep their current numbers.

From 1947 to 1990, it was possible for telephone users in the northern Virginia portion of 703 to dial any number in the Washington metropolitan area with only seven digits. While the Washington metro area was split among three area codes—Maryland's 301, the District's 202, and 703—it was a single local calling area. Every number in the Maryland and Virginia portions of the metro area was protected from assignment in the District's 202, essentially making 202 an overlay for the entire metro. One consequence of this was that no central office prefix could be duplicated anywhere in the Washington metro area. For instance, if a 1-202-574 number was in use in the District or a 1-301-574 was in use on the Maryland side of the metro, the corresponding 1-703-574 number could only be used in areas considered a safe distance from the Washington metro area, such as Roanoke and the Tri-Cities. By the end of the 1980s, the Washington area was running out of numbers, so the partial overlay of 202 was ended in 1990.

However, it soon became apparent that breaking seven-digit dialing in the Washington area would not free up enough numbers to keep up with demand on either side of the Potomac River. With this in mind, on June 19, 1995, most of the western portion of the old 703 area code was split off into the new area code 540, and 703 was restricted to northern Virginia. The same issue had forced the split of area code 410 from 301 four years earlier.

The 1995 split was intended to be a long-term solution. However, within four years, 703 was close to exhaustion due to the proliferation of cell phones, fax machines, and pagers, as well as northern Virginia's explosive growth. To solve this problem, area code 571 was introduced on March 1, 2000, as an overlay to 703. Area code 571 serves most new telephone numbers; while it is primarily associated with mobile telephone lines, it is also used for new landline numbers, including the United States Patent and Trademark Office upon moving to Alexandria; the Transportation Security Administration, which was created in 2001 and has its headquarters in Arlington; and the Fairfax County Public Schools, which moved its headquarters to the Falls Church area in 2006.

Even with the end of seven-digit dialing, much of the inner ring of the Washington metro area, including the bulk of the 703/571 territory, is still a local calling area spanning the District itself and much of the Maryland side. With few exceptions, no long-distance charges are applied from one portion of the metro area to the other.

== Local service providers ==
Although former competitors Bell Atlantic (a former Baby Bell) and GTE had assigned geographical monopolies varying by region in Virginia, they merged in the late 1990s to form Verizon, now the dominant local telephone service provider throughout Virginia, including both of these area codes. Over 85% of all telephone numbers in both of these area codes are served by Verizon, a regulated monopoly.

However, mobile telephone service is provided with numbers assigned these area codes by various operators such as AT&T and T-Mobile, in addition to Verizon Wireless.

Competition in the local telephone service market within these area codes has been joined by cable television operators such as Cox Communications, Comcast, and Verizon Fios, which provide local telephone service running over their own broadband fiber optic telecommunication networks (which also provide cable television and high-speed internet services).

== Dialing requirements ==
Because of the overlay of 703 and 571, 10-digit dialing is mandatory even for local calls; cellphone callers do the same on all direct-dialed calls. Long-distance calls are dialed as eleven digits, using the prefix 1, but for landline-based phones only.

== Service area ==
Area code 703 and the overlay area code 571 serve the following cities and towns in Virginia: Alexandria, Annandale, Ashburn, Burke, Centreville, Chantilly, Dale City, Fairfax, Falls Church, Franconia, Great Falls, Groveton, Herndon, Lake Ridge, Leesburg, Lorton, Manassas, Manassas Park, McLean, Mount Vernon, North Springfield, Oakton, Occoquan, Reston, South Riding, Springfield, Sterling, Vienna, West Springfield, and Woodbridge, plus all or part of these counties: Arlington, Fairfax, Loudoun, and Prince William.

== See also ==
- List of Virginia area codes

Virginia area codes: 276, 434, 540/826, 703/571, 757/948, 804/686
	North: 301/240	
West: 540/826	area code 703/571	East: 301/240, 202/771
	South: 540/826	
District of Columbia area codes: 202/771
Maryland area codes: 301/240/227, 410/443/667
