= Area codes 678, 470, and 943 =

Telephone area codes for the Atlanta metropolitan area

Coordinates: 33.75449°N 84.38966°W

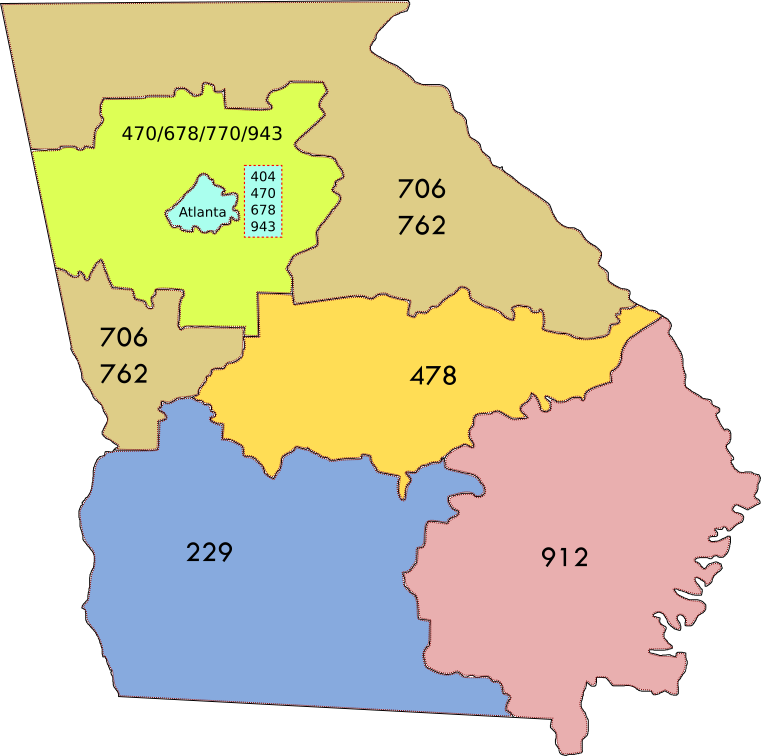
The telephone area codes of Georgia

Area codes 678, 470, and 943 are telephone area codes in the North American Numbering Plan (NANP) for the U.S. state of Georgia in the Atlanta metropolitan area. The area codes are assigned in an overlay plan to a combined numbering plan area (NPA) consisting of 404 (Atlanta and its suburbs inside Interstate 285) and 770 (Atlanta suburbs and exurbs outside of I-285).

== History ==
Telephone numbers in area code 678 were first assigned to customers signing up for new telephone service on January 15, 1998.

On September 2, 2001, area code 470, was added to the 678 overlay area of area codes 404 and 770. Telephone numbers for the NPA were assigned after exhaustion of area code 678.

In October of 2020, the Georgia Public Service Commission approved the creation of a new overlay area code after NANPA exhaustion analyses projected shortfall of central office prefixes by the second quarter of 2023. NANPA assigned area code 943 for relief, which commenced service on March 15, 2022.

Although ten-digit dialing was used in the Atlanta area since area code 770 was introduced in 1995, it was not until January 1, 1998, when 678 was implemented, that ten-digit dialing finally became required across the entire metro area.

All central office prefixes of area code 404 are assigned to service providers, the last having been issued in October 2013. Prefixes in 678 and 770 have also all been allocated, leaving only 470 central office codes available, although previously used numbers are always available for reassignment to new customers. Despite existing for decades before this change, the largest customer using area code 470 is Kennesaw State University in Kennesaw, which was forced to change hundreds of telephone numbers when the Georgia Board of Regents forced schools in the University System of Georgia to implement internal telephone systems, and the FCC failed to make local number portability applicable to businesses and government, allowing AT&T to refuse KSU to take its numbers to the new provider. Kennesaw State opted to use 470-578 (KSU) as their number prefix for the new phone numbers, outside of the normal geographical calling area for Kennesaw; 470-578 numbers are based in Atlanta Northeast and Kennesaw State is located in the Atlanta Northwest calling area.

The entire metro Atlanta region with area codes 404, 770, 678, 470, and 943 is a local calling area, one of the largest in the United States. No long-distance charges are applied for calls between area codes. All calls in the area are dialed with ten digits. In addition, calls to and from the Atlanta area with area codes 706 and 762, which serve most of north Georgia outside the metro area, are also local calls.

== Service area ==
The numbering plan area 678/470/943 includes the counties of Barrow, Bartow, Butts, Carroll, Cherokee, Clayton, Cobb, Coweta, DeKalb, Douglas, Fayette, Forsyth, Fulton, Gwinnett, Hall, Haralson, Henry, Heard (part with area codes 706 and 762), Lamar, Meriwether (part with area codes 706 and 762), Newton, Oconee, Paulding, Pike, Polk, Rockdale, Spalding, and Walton.

== See also ==
- List of Georgia area codes
- List of North American Numbering Plan area codes

Georgia area codes: 229, 404, 478, 678/470/943, 706/762, 770, 912
	North: 706/762	
West: 256/938	678/470/943 (overlaying 404 and 770)	East: 706/762
	South: 478, 706/762	
Alabama area codes: 205/659, 251, 256/938, 334
