= Area codes 804 and 686 =

Telephone area code in east-central Virginia, United States

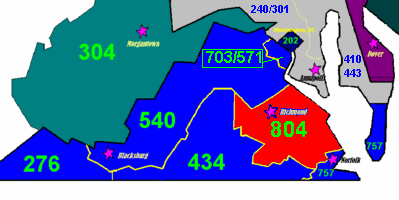
The area colored red indicates the geographical region of Virginia served by area code 804

Area codes 804 and 686 are telephone area codes in the North American Numbering Plan (NANP) for the east-central portion of Virginia. The numbering plan area (NPA) is anchored by Virginia's capital, Richmond, and includes most of its metropolitan area. Other communities included are Chesterfield, Henrico, Hopewell, Mechanicsville, Powhatan, Midlothian, Petersburg, and Colonial Heights. This also includes the Northern Neck and the Middle Peninsula.

The two southernmost counties on the Middle Peninsula, Gloucester and Mathews, are part of the Hampton Roads metropolitan area, but use 804 and 686 instead of the area codes 757 and 948 used by the rest of Hampton Roads.

== History ==
Area code 804 was split from Virginia's original area code 703 on Sunday, June 24, 1973, with an official permissive dialing period ending January 1, 1974. Originally, it stretched across the eastern two-thirds of the state, from Danville to the Eastern Shore. Normally, when an area code is split, the largest city in the old numbering plan area retains the old area code–in this case, Norfolk, then Virginia's largest city. However, C&P Telephone (now part of Verizon) wanted to keep the large number of federal agencies in Northern Virginia from having to change their numbers.

Despite the rapid growth of the Richmond-Petersburg and Hampton Roads areas, this configuration remained in place for 23 years. On July 1, 1996, the Eastern Shore and most of Hampton Roads became area code 757. Although Hampton Roads is the largest metropolitan area based in the Commonwealth, Bell Atlantic (forerunner of Verizon) decided to let Richmond keep 804 in order to spare the plethora of state agencies in the capital the expense and burden of having to change their numbers. This split was intended as a long-term solution, but by the turn of the century and millennium 804 was running out of numbers due to the rapid growth of the Richmond area, as well as the proliferation of cell phones and pagers. As a result, 804 was split again on June 1, 2001, when most of the western portion (Danville, Lynchburg, Charlottesville) became area code 434.

Prior to October 2021, area code 804 had telephone numbers assigned for the central office code 988. In 2020, 988 was designated nationwide as a dialing code for the National Suicide Prevention Lifeline, which created a conflict for exchanges that permit seven-digit dialing. This area code was therefore scheduled to transition to ten-digit dialing by October 24, 2021.

In 2022, area code 804 was forecasted to exhaust its pool of central office prefixes in the third quarter of 2024. The State Corporation Commission (SCC) announced on November 16, 2022, that it would overlay the existing area code, likely in the first half of 2024. On November 22, 2022, the SCC approved the new area code 686 to be implemented after all central office prefixes of area code 804 had been assigned. On January 9, 2023, the NANPA designated the assignment of the overlay to take effect on February 1, 2024, with network preparation beginning on May 1, 2023.

== See also ==
- List of Virginia area codes
- List of North American Numbering Plan area codes

Virginia area codes: 276, 434, 540/826, 703/571, 757/948, 804/686
	North: 571/703, 540/826	
West: 434	686/804	East: 757/948
	South: 434, 757/948	
Maryland area codes: 301/240/227, 410/443/667
