= Area codes 540 and 826 =

Area code for northwestern Virginia, United States

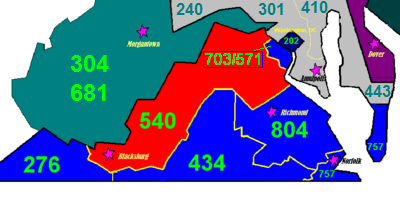
The area colored red indicates the northern region of Virginia served by area code 540

Area codes 540 and 826 are telephone area codes in the North American Numbering Plan (NANP) for the U.S. State of Virginia. Areas included are the outer portions of Northern Virginia/D.C Area along with areas in or around the Shenandoah Valley, Blue Ridge Mountains, New River Valley, and the Roanoke metropolitan area. The Virginia State Corporation Commission authorized the addition of 826 to the numbering plan area for implementation in May 2022.

== History ==
Area code 540 was established on July 15, 1995, when numbering plan area 703 was divided. The independent cities of Alexandria, Fairfax, Falls Church, Manassas, and Manassas Park and the counties of Arlington, Fairfax, Loudoun, Prince William along with very small portions of Fauquier and Stafford remained in the area code 703, while the rest of the area was reassigned to the area code 540.

Due to the continued growth of telecommunication services in the area, it was necessary to split 540 as well. On September 1, 2001, the farthest western region of Virginia was established as a separate numbering plan area with area code 276.

The pool of central office codes for the area code was projected to exhaust in 2022. For relief, the Virginia State Corporation Commission approved a plan in June 2020 to add area code 826 to form an all-services overlay, with an in-service date of May 14, 2022. This made ten-digit dialing mandatory in the overlay area.

== Service area ==
The numbering plan area includes the communities of Bedford, Berryville, Blacksburg, Buchanan, Buena Vista, Cave Spring, Clifton Forge, Covington, Fincastle, Floyd, Fredericksburg, Front Royal, Greenville, Harrisonburg, Hot Springs, Lexington, Louisa, Luray, Madison, Mineral, Orange, Pulaski, Radford, Roanoke, Rocky Mount, Salem, Staunton, Warrenton, Little Washington, Waynesboro, and Winchester.

It serves the counties of Alleghany, Augusta, Bath, Botetourt, Clarke, Craig, Culpeper, Fauquier, Floyd, Franklin, Frederick, Giles, Highland, King George, Louisa, Madison, Montgomery, Orange, Page, Pulaski, Rappahannock, Roanoke, Rockingham, Rockbridge, Shenandoah, Spotsylvania, Stafford, and Warren, as well as portions of Bedford County, and a small portion of Albemarle County consisting of Afton and Greenwood that is in a LATA served by Verizon landline service rather than CenturyLink. It also partially serves western Loudoun County, whereas most of the county is in the numbering plan area 703/571.

== See also ==
- List of North American Numbering Plan area codes
- List of Virginia area codes

Virginia area codes: 276, 434, 540/826, 703/571, 757/948, 804/686
	North: 304/681	
West: 276, 304/681	540/826	East: 571/703, 240/301, 434
	South: 434, 804/686	
Maryland area codes: 301/240/227, 410/443/667
West Virginia area codes: 304/681
