= Area codes 615 and 629 =

Telephone area codes in Tennessee, US

Area codes 615 and 629 (highlighted in red)

Area codes 615 and 629 are area codes in Tennessee serving Nashville (Davidson County) and the twelve surrounding counties. 615 is the parent area code, created in 1954, while 629 was added to the 615 numbering plan area in formation of an overlay complex in 2015. Other major cities in the service area are Murfreesboro, Franklin, Brentwood, Gallatin, Hendersonville, and Lebanon.

== History ==
When the first area codes were assigned in October 1947, Tennessee's only area code was 901. During 1954, in a flash-cut, most of the state east of the Tennessee River's western bend was reassigned 615, while 901 was restricted to Memphis and the western third of the state. This configuration remained in place for over 41 years.

In September 1995, most of the eastern portion of 615—including Chattanooga, Knoxville, and the Tri-Cities—was assigned area code 423. The dividing line between 615 and 423 mostly tracked along the boundary between the Eastern and Central Time Zones; generally, Tennessee's share of the Eastern Time Zone transferred to 423. As a result, the state's three area codes were roughly coextensive with the traditional Grand Divisions of Tennessee; 423 served almost all of East Tennessee, 615 served nearly all of Middle Tennessee, and 901 served nearly all of West Tennessee.

Although this was intended to be a long-term solution, within a year, 615 was nearing exhaustion due to the rapid growth of the Nashville area, as well as the proliferation of cell phones and pagers. This forced yet another split in September 1997 and 615 was reduced to its current size, while most of the western, southern, and eastern portions of the old 615 territory, including Clarksville, Cookeville, Columbia, and Tullahoma, was split off with area code 931, which almost entirely surrounds 615. This made 615 largely coextensive with the inner ring of the Nashville metropolitan area.

In 1999, the North American Numbering Plan Administrator (NANPA) informed the Tennessee Regulatory Authority (TRA) that the available central office prefixes in 615 would be exhausted by the fourth quarter of 2000. The TRA and telecommunications providers implemented several number conservation measures that succeeded in averting the predicted crisis. In 2003 the NANPA notified the TRA that the area code was not projected to exhaust its supply of numbers for at least five years. As of March 2012 it was estimated that it would exhaust in the second quarter of 2015, by which time an additional split or an overlay might be necessary. An overlay of 615—which would be Tennessee's first overlay—was recommended. The decision to implement the new area code as an overlay, rather than a split, was made to spare Nashville-area residents and businesses the expense and burden of having to change their numbers, which would have required en masse reprogramming of cell phones.

Area code 629 was approved on October 21, 2013. Permissive dialing began on July 26, 2014, during which it was possible to make calls with either seven or ten digits. Ten-digit dialing has been required since late February 2015.

== See also ==
- List of North American Numbering Plan area codes
- List of Tennessee area codes

Tennessee area codes: 423, 615/629, 731, 865, 901, 931
	North: 270	
West: 931	area code 615/629	East: 931
	South: 931	
Kentucky area codes: 270/364, 502, 606, 859
