= Area codes 704 and 980 =

Area code for Charlotte, North Carolina

North Carolina Area Codes

Area codes 704 and 980 are telephone area codes in the North American Numbering Plan (NANP) for Charlotte and all or part of 12 surrounding counties in south-central North Carolina. Other major cities in the service area are Gastonia, Kannapolis, Concord, Mooresville, Salisbury, Statesville, and Shelby. The South Carolina side of the Charlotte metropolitan area is part of area codes 803 and 839. Area code 704 is one of the original area codes assigned to numbering plan areas (NPAs) by AT&T in October 1947. Area code 980 was added in an overlay numbering plan in 2001.

== History ==
Area code 704 was assigned to one of the original 86 numbering plan areas (NPAs) identified by the American Telephone and Telegraph Company in 1947, which comprised the entire state of North Carolina. In 1954, the eastern two-thirds of the state–from Winston-Salem eastward–were established as a distinct numbering plan area with area code 919, which reduced 704 to the western third of the state, from Charlotte through the Blue Ridge Mountains to the Tennessee border.

This configuration remained in place for the next 44 years. Despite the presence of Charlotte, the state's largest city, the western third of the state was not as populous as the eastern two-thirds, which grew from having one area code to four from 1993 to 1998. By the mid-1990s, Charlotte's rapid growth and the ensuing demand for telephone services due to cell phones, pagers, and fax machines, required installation of additional central offices. In 1998, most of the western portion of 704, including the Foothills and Blue Ridge, were split off with area code 828, restricting 704 to the Charlotte area.

Within two years, 704 faced exhaustion of resources once again. The continued proliferation of cell phones and pagers made it apparent that the creation of 828 did not provide enough relief to meet demand. For mitigation, BellSouth, the Charlotte area's dominant carrier, decided to assign 980 to Charlotte as North Carolina's first overlay. The overlay entered service on May 1, 2000. On that date, a permissive dialing period began in which both seven- and ten-digit dialing was allowed. As of January 10, 2001, ten-digit dialing was mandatory. The first central office prefixes were activated on February 10, 2001.

Even with the Charlotte area's continued growth, the 704/980 numbering pool is nowhere near exhaustion. Under the most recent NANP projections, the Charlotte area will not need another area code until at least mid-2047.

Years after the introduction of mobile number portability, a number of cell phone customers on the South Carolina side of the Charlotte area have 704 numbers.

== Service area ==
=== Counties ===
- Alexander (A southeast sliver is in 704/980. Most of the county is in 828.)
- Anson
- Cabarrus
- Catawba (Slivers in southeast and northeast are in 704/980. Most of the county is in 828.)
- Cleveland (except sliver in southwest which is in 828)
- Gaston
- Iredell
- Lincoln
- Mecklenburg (All landline phone numbers in Charlotte-Mecklenburg public schools use 980 area code.)
- Rowan
- Rutherford (small area east of Hollis, remainder of county is in 828)
- Stanly
- Union

=== Cities and towns ===
- Albemarle
- Belmont
- Bessemer City
- Boiling Springs
- Charlotte
  - All Charlotte–Mecklenburg Public School landlines use the 980 area code.
- Cherryville
- China Grove
- Cleveland
- Concord
- Cornelius
- Dallas
- Denver
- Davidson
- Gastonia
- Harmony
- Harrisburg
- Huntersville
- Indian Trail
- Kannapolis
- Landis
- Lincolnton
- Love Valley
- Matthews
- Mint Hill
- Monroe
- Mooresville
- Mount Holly
- Mount Ulla
- Olin
- Pineville
- Rockwell
- Salisbury
- Shelby
- Spencer
- Stallings
- Statesville
- Troutman
- Wadesboro
- Waxhaw
- Wingate

== See also ==
- List of North Carolina area codes
- List of NANP area codes

North Carolina area codes: 252, 336/743, 704/980, 828, 910/472, 919/984
	North: 336 / 743	
West: 828	704 / 980	East: 910
	South: 803/839, 843/854	
South Carolina area codes: 803/839, 843/854, 864/821
