= Area codes 910 and 472 =

Area code in southeastern North Carolina, United States

Map of North Carolina area codes

Area codes 910 and 472 are telephone area codes in the North American Numbering Plan (NANP) for southeastern North Carolina. The area codes form an overlay for a numbering plan area (NPA) that includes the cities of Wilmington, Jacksonville, Laurinburg, Lumberton and Fayetteville. Area code 910 was established in 1993, and 472 was added to the same area in October 2022.

== History ==
Area code 910 was established in 1993 in an area code split from area code 919, and was North Carolina's first new area code in 39 years. It served a fan-shaped region in the southeastern and north-central portions of the state, including the Piedmont Triad, the Sandhills, and the southeastern coast. The two parts were only connected by a tendril in the Sandhills.

Within only three years, 910 was already on the brink of exhaustion due to rapid growth in the Triad, Wilmington and Fayetteville, as well as the proliferation of cell phones and pagers. On December 15, 1997, area code 336 was created for the Triad and most of the old 910 territory's western portion. Normally, when an area code is split, the more populated portion keeps the old area code–in this case, the Triad. However, it was decided to let the southeastern portion of the state keep 910.

Area code 910 has telephone numbers assigned for the central office code 988. 988 has been designated nationwide as a dialing code for the National Suicide Prevention Lifeline, which creates a conflict for exchanges that permit seven-digit dialing. This area code was therefore required to transition to ten-digit dialing, mandatory after October 24, 2021.

With a forecast that numbers would run out by 2023, area code 472 was approved for use in the numbering plan area beginning on October 7, 2022. No permissive dialing period was necessary, as ten-digit dialing was already required.

=== Prior use of 910 for TWX ===
In 1962, AT&T assigned area code 510, then designated as a Service Access Code (SAC) of the format N10, for conversion to dial service of the Teletypewriter Exchange Service (TWX) in the United States. Later in the decade, additional area codes, including 810 were assigned. NPA 810 served every U.S. point west of the Mississippi River. Telex use of the area code was decommissioned in 1981 after conversion of the service to new transmission technologies by Western Union.

== See also ==
- List of North Carolina area codes
- List of NANP area codes

North Carolina area codes: 252, 336/743, 704/980, 828, 910/472, 919/984
	North: 252, 336/743, 919/984	
West: 704/980	910/472	East: Atlantic Ocean
	South: 843/854	
South Carolina area codes: 803/839, 843/854, 864/821
