= Area code 931 =

Area code in Tennessee, United States

Numbering plan area 931, highlighted in red

Area code 931 is the telephone area code in the North American Numbering Plan (NANP) serving a horseshoe-shaped region of twenty-eight counties in Middle Tennessee. Area code 931 initiated service on September 15, 1997 in an area code split of 615, which had previously served almost all of Middle Tennessee. The split reduced the numbering plan area to the inner ring of Nashville. Permissive dialing of 615 continued across Middle Tennessee until January 15, 1998.

== Service area ==
The numbering plan area comprises almost all of Middle Tennessee, except for the Nashville metropolitan area. It contains the following municipalities, towns, or cities:

- Algood, Tennessee
- Altamont, Tennessee
- Baxter, Tennessee
- Beersheba Springs, Tennessee
- Byrdstown, Tennessee
- Celina, Tennessee
- Clarkrange, Tennessee
- Clarksville, Tennessee
- Dover, Tennessee
- Columbia, Tennessee
- Cookeville, Tennessee
- Cowan, Tennessee
- Crossville, Tennessee
- Estill Springs, Tennessee
- Fairfield Glade, Tennessee
- Fayetteville, Tennessee
- Gainesboro, Tennessee
- Hohenwald, Tennessee
- Huntland, Tennessee
- Jamestown, Tennessee
- Lawrenceburg, Tennessee
- Lewisburg, Tennessee
- Linden, Tennessee
- Livingston, Tennessee
- Lynchburg, Tennessee
- Manchester, Tennessee
- McEwen, Tennessee
- McMinnville, Tennessee
- Monteagle, Tennessee
- Monterey, Tennessee
- New Johnsonville, Tennessee
- Pulaski, Tennessee
- Sewanee, Tennessee
- Shelbyville, Tennessee
- Sparta, Tennessee
- Spencer, Tennessee
- Spring Hill, Tennessee
- Tracy City, Tennessee
- Tullahoma, Tennessee
- Winchester, Tennessee
- Waverly, Tennessee
- Waynesboro, Tennessee
- Erin, Tennessee
- Tennessee Ridge, Tennessee

=== Counties ===
The following counties are contained in full or in part in the numbering plan area:

- Bedford
- Clay
- Coffee
- Cumberland
- Fentress
- Franklin
- Giles
- Grundy
- Hickman
- Houston
- Humphreys
- Jackson
- Lawrence
- Lewis
- Lincoln
- Marshall
- Maury
- Montgomery
- Moore
- Overton
- Perry
- Pickett
- Putnam
- Stewart
- VanBuren
- Warren
- Wayne
- White

Tennessee area codes: 423, 615/629, 731, 865, 901, 931
	North: 615/629, 270/364, 606	
West: 731, 901	931	East: 423, 865
	South: 256/938	
Kentucky area codes: 270/364, 502, 606, 859
Alabama area codes: 205/659, 251, 256/938, 334
