= Area code 731 =

Area code in Tennessee, United States

Numbering plan area 731, highlighted in red

Area code 731 is a telephone area code in the North American Numbering Plan (NANP) for the western part of the U.S. state of Tennessee.

The numbering plan area (NPA) includes the cities of Jackson, Tiptonville, Savannah, Union City, Dyersburg, Lexington, Selmer, Ripley, Martin, Brownsville, Paris, and Bolivar.

Area code 731 was created in September 2001 in a split of area code 901, which was the original area code created for the entire state in 1947. NPA 901 has since been restricted for use in the greater Memphis metropolitan area only.

Prior to October 2021, area code 731 had telephone numbers assigned for the central office code 988. In 2020, 988 was designated nationwide as a dialing code for the National Suicide Prevention Lifeline, which created a conflict for exchanges that still permitted seven-digit dialing. This area code was therefore scheduled to transition to ten-digit dialing by October 24, 2021.

Tennessee area codes: 423, 615/629, 731, 865, 901, 931
| | North: 270 | |
| West: 573, 870, 901 | area code 731 | East: 931 |
| | South: 901, 662, 256/938 | |
Kentucky area codes: 270/364, 502, 606, 859
Alabama area codes: 205/659, 251, 256/938, 334
Mississippi area codes: 228, 601/769, 471/662
Arkansas area codes: 479, 501, 870/327
Missouri area codes: 314/557, 417, 573/235, 636, 660, 816/975
