= Area code 901 =

Telephone area code serving Memphis, Tennessee

Numbering plan area 901, highlighted in red

Area code 901 is a telephone area code in the North American Numbering Plan (NANP) for Memphis, Tennessee, and most of its inner-ring suburbs. It is the smallest numbering plan area in the state.

== History ==
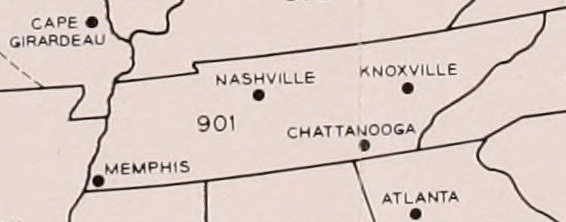
Area code 901 as of 1947-1954.

Area code 901 was one of the original North American area codes created in 1947 for the first nationwide telephone numbering plan. It served the entire state of Tennessee until 1954, when the state was divided in a flash cut into two numbering plan areas. West Tennessee retained the area code, while the remainder of the state (eastern two-thirds - essentially the part east of the Tennessee River) received area code 615.

Despite the presence of Memphis, the state's largest city at the time, West Tennessee is not as densely populated as the state's other two Grand Divisions. As a result, while the eastern two-thirds of the state went from one area code to four from 1995 to 1999, 901 remained the sole area code for West Tennessee for 47 years. However, by the turn of the millennium, 901 was close to exhaustion due to the Memphis area's growth, as well as the proliferation of cell phones and pagers. On September 17, 2001, area code 731 was assigned to most of West Tennessee outside the immediate Memphis area. Area code 901 was reduced to Shelby, Fayette, Hardeman, and Tipton counties, an area largely coextensive with the Memphis metropolitan area.

Despite the Memphis area's growth and the continued demand for telecommunication services, 901 is not in danger of exhaustion. According to 2021 projections, relief will not be required until about 2035. It is one of the few urban area codes that have not been overlaid, making Memphis one of the largest cities where seven-digit dialing is still possible.

The area code was the inspiration for the name of Memphis 901 FC, a local professional soccer team that plays in the USL Championship.

== Service area ==
Major cities in these counties are the following.

=== Hardeman County ===
- Whiteville

=== Fayette County ===
- Somerville

=== Shelby County ===
- Arlington
- Bartlett
- Collierville
- Germantown
- Memphis
- Millington

=== Tipton County ===
- Covington

== See also ==
- List of North American Numbering Plan area codes

Tennessee area codes: 423, 615/629, 731, 865, 901, 931
	North: 731	
West: 870	area code 901	East: 731
	South: 662	
Mississippi area codes: 228, 601/769, 471/662
Arkansas area codes: 479, 501, 870/327
