= Pine Lake =

Pine Lake may refer to:

== Inhabited places ==
=== Canada ===
- Pine Lake, Alberta

=== United States ===
- Pine Lake, Arizona
- Pine Lake, Georgia
- Pine Lake, Wisconsin, a town
- Pine Lake, Iron County, Wisconsin, an unincorporated community
- Pine Lake Township, Cass County, Minnesota
- Pine Lake Township, Clearwater County, Minnesota
- Pine Lake Township, Otter Tail County, Minnesota
- Pine Lake Township, Pine County, Minnesota

== Lakes ==
=== Canada ===
- Pine Lake (Alberta)

=== United States ===
- Pine Lake (San Francisco), California
- Pine Lake (Duxbury, Massachusetts)
- Pine Lake (West Bloomfield Township, Michigan)
- Pine Lake (Cass County, Minnesota)
- Pine Lake (Chisago County, Minnesota)
- Pine Lake (Clearwater County, Minnesota)
- Pine Lake (Otter Tail County, Minnesota)
- Pine Lake (Delaware County, New York)
- Pine Lake (Fulton County, New York)
- Pine Lake (Hamilton County, New York)
- Pine Lake (Lewis County, New York)
- Pine Lake (Washington), popular recreation and fishing spot
- Pine Lake (Rusk County, Wisconsin)
- Pine Lake (Wisconsin), source of the Montreal River, Wisconsin
- Pine Lake Environmental Campus, property of Hartwick College
- Upper Pine Lake and Lower Pine Lake, in Pine Lake State Park, Iowa
- Lake Charlevoix in Charlevoix County, Michigan, known as Pine Lake until 1926

== See also ==
- Big Pine Lake (Isanti County, Minnesota), United States
- Little Pine Lake, Brantingham, New York, United States
- Nya Upsala, Pine Lake Swedish Settlement in Pine Lake, Wisconsin, United States
- Pine Lake Aerodrome, in Canada
- Pine Lake Camp, Salvation Army camp located in Pine Lake, Alberta, Canada
- Pine Lake Park (disambiguation)
- Pine Lake tornado (2000), central Alberta, Canada
- Pine Lake Township (disambiguation)
