= Pine Lake Township =

Pine Lake Township may refer to the following places in the U.S. state of Minnesota:

- Pine Lake Township, Cass County, Minnesota
- Pine Lake Township, Clearwater County, Minnesota
- Pine Lake Township, Otter Tail County, Minnesota
- Pine Lake Township, Pine County, Minnesota

== See also ==
- Pine Lake (disambiguation)
