= Silver Birches =

Silver Birches may refer to:

in Canada

- Silver Birches (Salvation Army Camp), in Newfoundland, near Corner Brook

in the United States

- Silver Birches (hotel), Hawley, Pennsylvania, one of the Historic Hotels of America

== See also ==
- Betula pendula, the silver birch tree
