= Tornadoes of 2000 =

Tornadoes in 2000

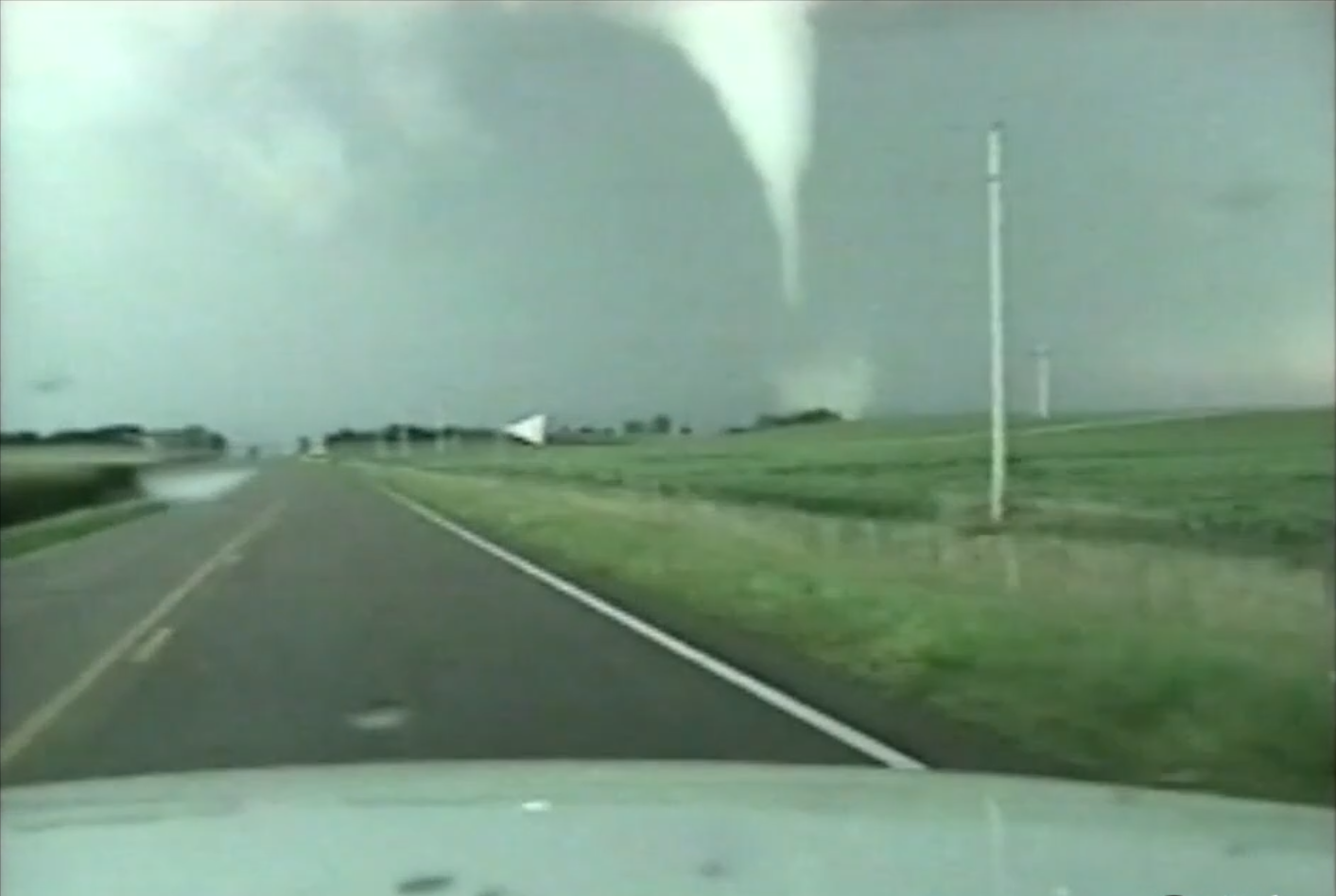
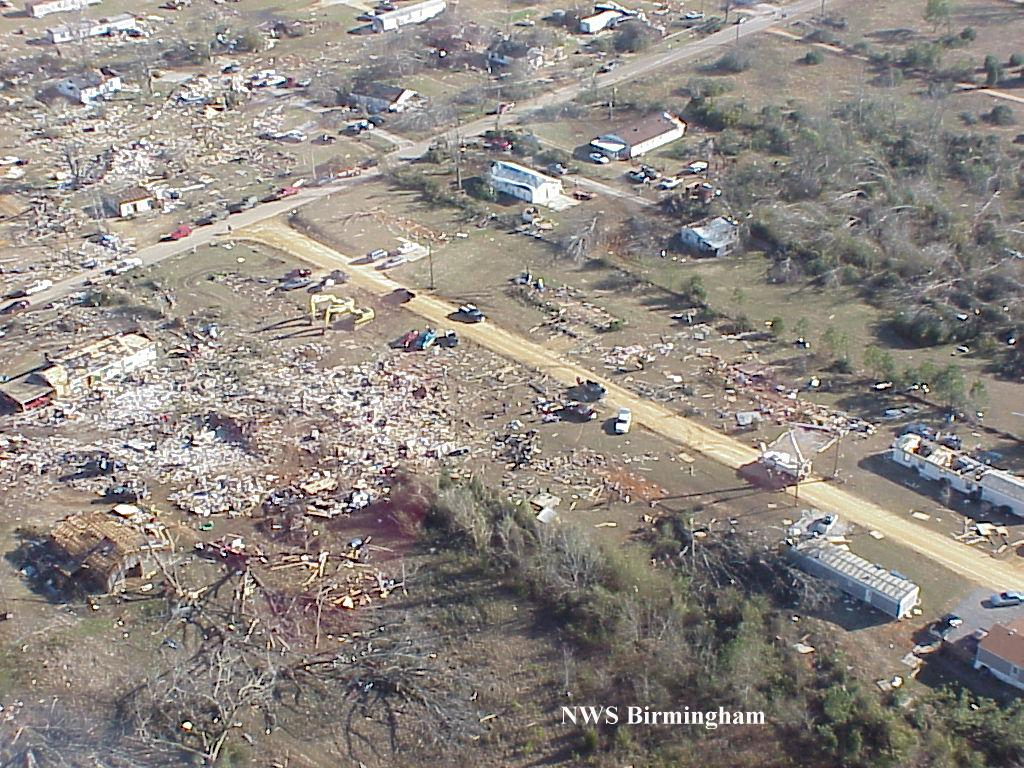
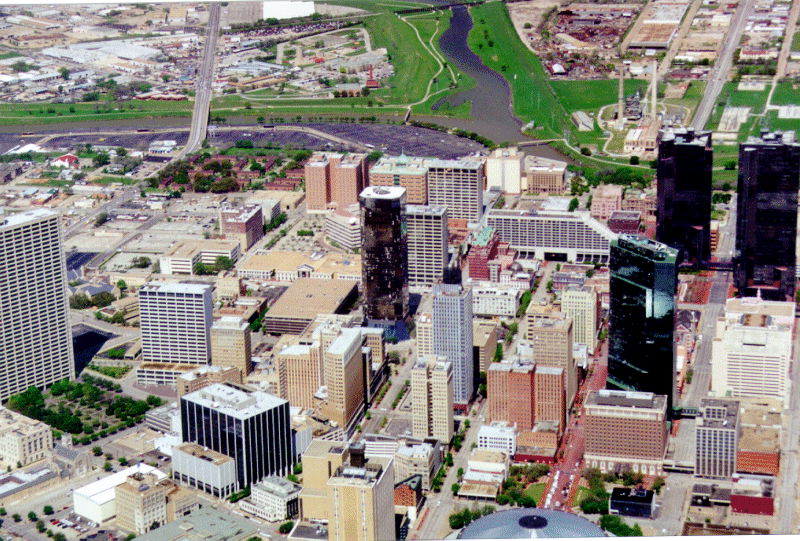
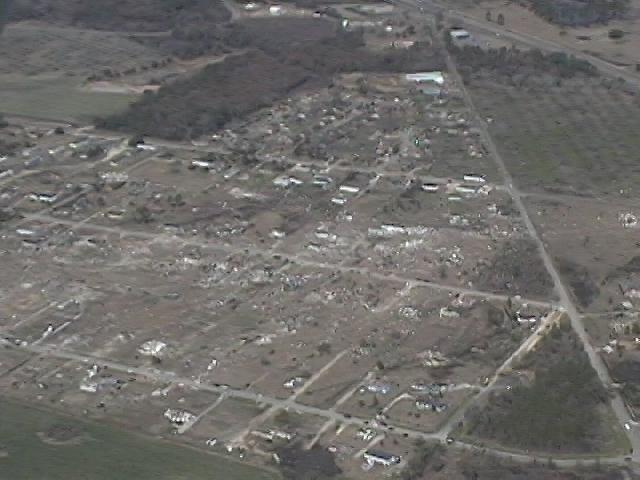
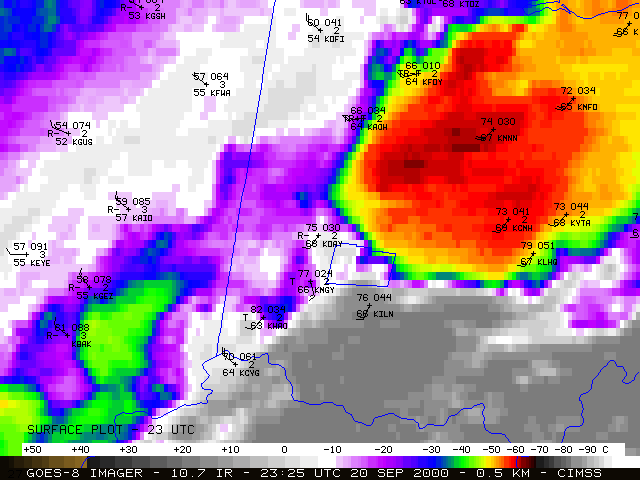
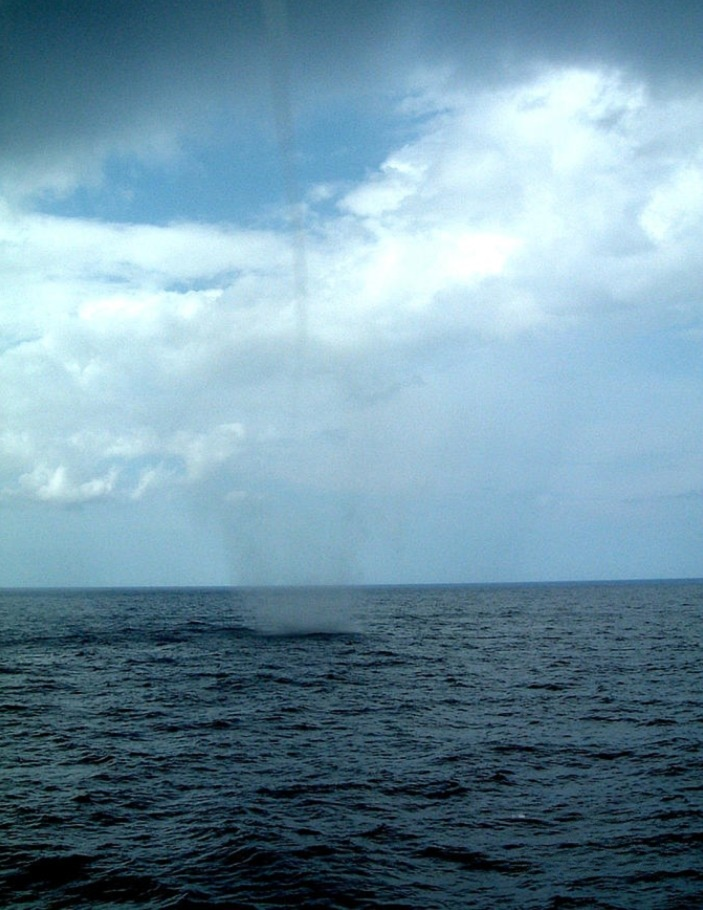
- Clockwise from top: A large F4 tornado near Granite Falls, Minnesota shortly after formation on July 25; Downtown Fort Worth, Texas after a direct hit from an F3 tornado on March 28; A satellite image of the parent storm that produced an F4 tornado that tracked through Xenia, Ohio on September 20; A waterspout over the eastern Pacific Ocean in November; An aerial photo of a mobile home park near Camilla, Georgia after an F3 tornado on February 13; Damage to southern sections of Tuscaloosa, Alabama after an F4 tornado on December 16.
- Timespan: January - December 2000
- Maximum rated tornado: F4 tornado: Granite Falls, Minnesota on July 25; Xenia, Ohio on September 20; Tuscaloosa, Alabama on December 16
- Tornadoes in U.S.: 1,075
- Damage (U.S.): $424 million
- Fatalities (U.S.): 41
- Fatalities (worldwide): ≥53

This page documents the tornadoes and tornado outbreaks of 2000, primarily (but not entirely) in the United States. Most tornadoes form in the U.S., although some events may take place internationally, particularly in parts of neighboring southern Canada during the summer season.

== Synopsis ==
The 2000 tornado season as a whole was slightly below normal to near average. There were 1,075 tornadoes confirmed in the United States. January was not the most active with just 16 tornado reports, but three of them were severe. Activity in February was high, with several strong tornadoes throughout the South. March was also quite active, with a notable tornado in Fort Worth, Texas taking place at the end of the month. The spring months saw normal activity, with substantial outbreaks in both April and May. Most of June was marked by below normal activity, with 135 tornadoes confirmed. The end of June and all of July had tornado reports nearly every day, resulting in an active early summer period. This activity continued into the beginning of August, but the latter part of the month saw few tornadoes, as well as the start of September. The rest of September was slightly more active. The fall months had normal activity; however, a pattern shift at the end of November caused the first two weeks of December to be inactive. The F4 storm in Tuscaloosa, Alabama was the second-deadliest December tornado since 1950.

== Events ==
=== United States yearly total ===
Confirmed tornadoes by Fujita rating
FU	F0	F1	F2	F3	F4	F5	Total
0	723	267	62	20	3	0	1,075

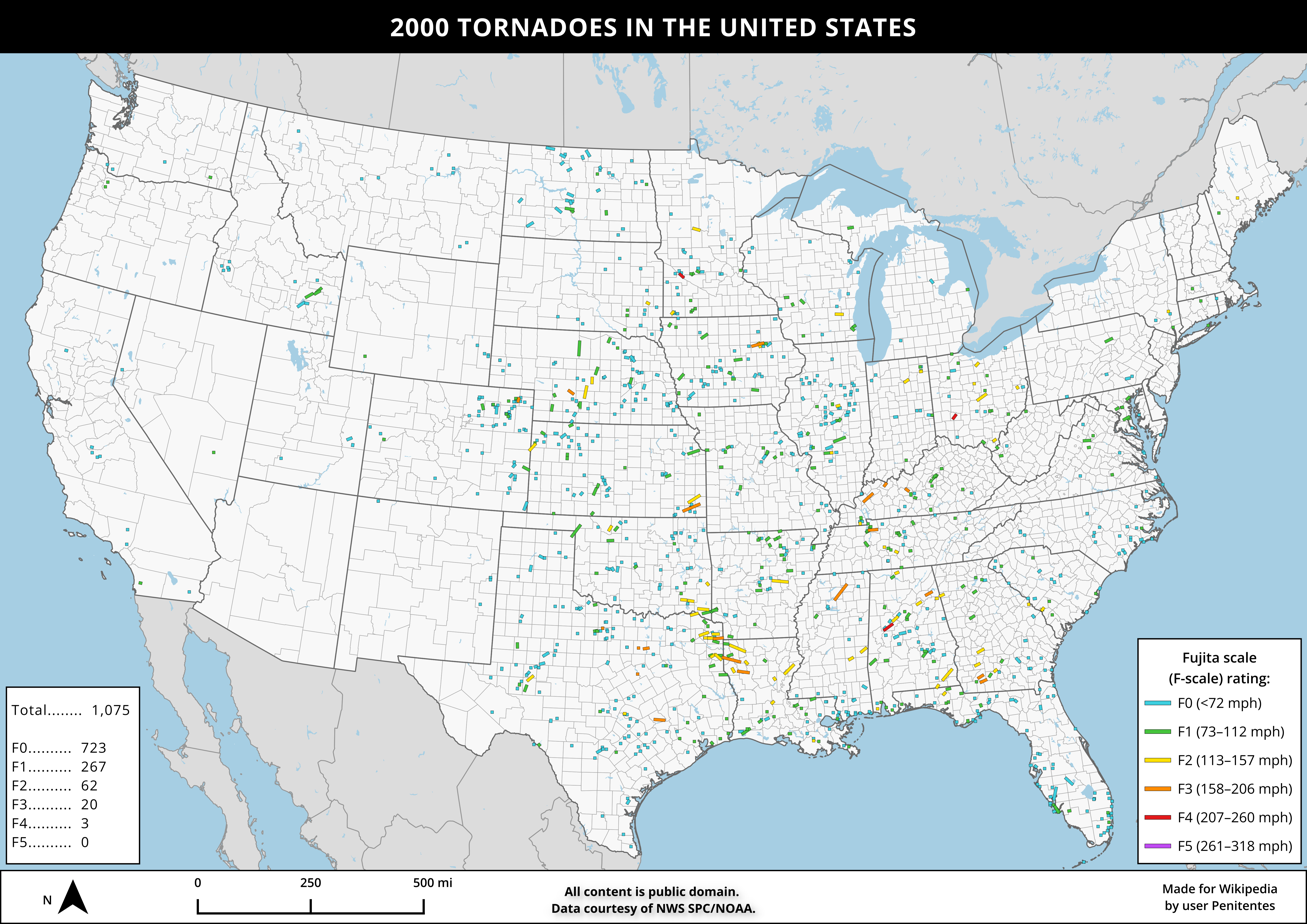
Map of 2000 United States tornado paths.

Fatal United States tornadoes in 2000
- Approximate touchdown location of killer tornadoes in 2000 Summary of tornadoes: February 13 – Georgia (11 deaths); February 13 – Georgia (7 deaths); February 14 – Georgia (1 death); March 28 – Texas (2 deaths); April 2 – Alabama (1 death); April 20 – Tennessee (1 death); May 11 – Iowa (1 death); May 12 – Texas (2 deaths); July 25 – Minnesota (1 death); September 20 – Ohio (1 death); September 22 – South Carolina (1 death); December 16 – Alabama (1 death); December 16 – Alabama (11 deaths); Total fatalities: 41

== January ==
There were 16 tornadoes confirmed in the U.S. in January.

=== January 3 ===
FU	F0	F1	F2	F3	F4	F5
0	1	6	1	3	0	0

A small, but damaging outbreak of 11 tornadoes impacted Arkansas, Mississippi, Indiana, and Kentucky.

== February ==
There were 56 tornadoes confirmed in the U.S. in February.

=== February 13–14 ===
FU	F0	F1	F2	F3	F4	F5
0	7	6	2	2	0	0

A storm system spawned strong tornadoes across the Southeast on February 13, killing 19 people and injuring 175, making it the deadliest outbreak in the year. All the deaths occurred in Southwestern Georgia. The most notable tornado was an F3 storm that caused 11 fatalities in the city of Camilla. Several other states, such as Alabama, Arkansas, Florida, and Tennessee were affected on the February 13, and a few weak tornadoes struck the Carolinas on the February 14.

== March ==
There were 102 tornadoes confirmed in the U.S. in March.

=== March 28 ===
FU	F0	F1	F2	F3	F4	F5
0	7	1	0	2	0	0

A low-end F3 tornado struck the city of Fort Worth, Texas on March 28, killing two people and injuring 80. The storm took a 4-mile-path (6.4 km) through the city, damaging skyscrapers and other high-rise buildings. The same storm also produced another F3 tornado, in Arlington, Texas leaving about 80 people homeless along its 8-mile-path (13 km). The tornadoes were a part of small outbreak of tornadoes, the rest of which were rated F0 or F1.

== April ==
There were 135 tornadoes confirmed in the U.S. in April.

=== April 3 ===
A storm system spawned 29 tornadoes from Texas to South Carolina on April 3, mainly F0 and F1 storms. One of the strongest tornadoes, an F2, killed one person in Piedmont, Alabama.

=== April 23 ===
An outbreak of tornadoes on April 23, Easter Sunday, produced 33 tornadoes across Oklahoma, Texas, Arkansas, and Louisiana, with three of these being rated F3. An F1 tornado moved through Shreveport, Louisiana, injuring six people.

== May ==
There were 241 tornadoes confirmed in the U.S. in May.

=== May 11–12 ===
On May 11, an F3 tornado killed one person near Cedar Falls, Iowa. On May 12, another F3 storm caused two fatalities in Laguna Park, Texas.

=== May 17–18 ===
A storm system produced 69 tornadoes from May 17 to May 18, which occurred from Colorado to New York. Most were rated F0, but one powerful F3 storm near Brady, Nebraska injured two people.

=== May 27 ===
An F3 tornado struck Erin, Tennessee. Many homes lost roofs and walls and a pavilion was destroyed. Damage totaled $1.3 million.

== June ==
There were 136 tornadoes confirmed in the U.S. in June.

== July ==
There were 148 tornadoes confirmed in the U.S. in July.

=== July 14 (Canada) ===
A severe thunderstorm over the Rockies tracked eastward across the province during the early evening on July 14. At 7:00 MDT, an F3 tornado touched down and moved toward Green Acres Campground at Pine Lake, Alberta. 12 people at the campground were killed and over 100 were injured. Winds up to 300 km/h (190 mph) caused $15.2 million (2000 Canadian dollars) in damage to the campground. Overall, it ranks as the fourth-deadliest tornado in Canadian history.

=== July 19 (Philippines) ===
A strong tornado with winds of about 174 mph (280 km/h) and a width of about 33 feet (10 meters) struck a coastal village in Naval, Biliran at around 2:00 PhST, almost leveling the coastal village of Sto. Niño. The tornado seriously injured 25 people, rendered 418 people homeless, and damaged at least 92 houses, causing P15 million in losses. It also severely damaged the Biliran Provincial Hospital and its main, women's, and health buildings which resulted in P3 million in structural damage, and injuring four patients from broken glass. It also knocked down power and telephone lines, and destroyed a portion of the Naval Provincial Hospital's press room.

=== July 25 ===
A moderate outbreak of 14 tornadoes took place across Minnesota, 12 of these were rated F0; however, a violent storm hit the city of Granite Falls in Yellow Medicine County, which killed one and injured 15. The tornado first touched down in rural parts of the county west-northwest of Granite Falls, hitting the city at 6:10 pm. After tearing through the residential sections of town, the tornado lifted at approximately 6:25 pm after being on the ground for over 9 miles (14 km). Most of the damage in Granite Falls was rated F2 and F3, but the extent of the damage at the corner of 9th avenue and 14th street caused the National Weather Service to classify it as an F4 tornado. The town and surrounding area suffered millions of dollars in property damage as a result of this tornado, which is ranked as one of the strongest in Minnesota's history.

== August ==
There were 52 tornadoes confirmed in the U.S. in August.

== September ==
There were 47 tornadoes confirmed in the U.S. in September.

=== September 19 (France) ===
An EF2/F3 tornado impacted downtown Montpellier, France with a width of around 500 feet (150 meters). Three people were killed and it toppled a large crane onto a construction site and houses were unroofed.

=== September 20 ===
Four tornadoes touched down across Ohio. The most notable storm was an F4 tornado that moved through Xenia. One person was killed and 100 were injured along its 21-mile path, which paralleled the path of the famous tornado in 1974. It was that tornado which prompted local officials to install 10 tornado sirens across Greene County, Ohio, which failed to function during the tornado, due to power outages and no battery backup system. In the end, 48 homes were destroyed and 125 were damaged by the tornado.

== October ==
There were 64 tornadoes confirmed in the U.S. in October.

=== October 11 (Brazil) ===
An F3 tornado struck the city of Viamão. Brick houses were destroyed, trees were stripped of their bark. 1 death after being thrown 100 meters away.

== November ==
There were 50 tornadoes confirmed in the U.S. in November.

== December ==
There were 26 tornadoes confirmed in the U.S. in December.

=== December 16 ===
FU	F0	F1	F2	F3	F4	F5
0	10	3	9	1	1	0

After a lull in activity, a storm system produced a moderate outbreak of tornadoes on December 16, the strongest which killed 11 and injured 125 in Tuscaloosa, Alabama and was rated F4. The tornado moved through portions of Southeastern Tuscaloosa destroying 110 homes and causing $12 million in damages (2000 US dollars). This tornado is tied as the 4th deadliest December tornado since 1950, only behind the F5 in Vicksburg, Mississippi on December 5, 1953, the 2021 Western Kentucky tornado on December 10, and the 2021 Bowling Green tornado on December 11. In the end, the entire outbreak of 24 tornadoes was responsible for 12 fatalities and $35 million in damage across seven states.

== See also ==
- Tornado
  - Tornadoes by year
  - Tornado records
  - Tornado climatology
  - Tornado myths
- List of tornado outbreaks
  - List of F5 and EF5 tornadoes
  - List of F4 and EF4 tornadoes
  - List of North American tornadoes and tornado outbreaks
  - List of 20th-century Canadian tornadoes and tornado outbreaks
  - List of European tornadoes and tornado outbreaks
  - List of tornadoes and tornado outbreaks in Asia
  - List of Southern Hemisphere tornadoes and tornado outbreaks
  - List of tornadoes striking downtown areas
  - List of tornadoes with confirmed satellite tornadoes
- Tornado intensity
  - Fujita scale
  - Enhanced Fujita scale
  - International Fujita scale
  - TORRO scale
