= Whipholt, Minnesota =

Unincorporated community in Minnesota, US

Whipholt
- Census-designated place (CDP) and Unincorporated community
- Location within Minnesota Location within the United States
- Coordinates: 47°02′56″N 94°21′55″W
- Country: United States
- State: Minnesota
- County: Cass
- Township: Pine Lake Township

Area
  - Total: 3.49 sq mi (9.03 km^{2})
  - Land: 3.25 sq mi (8.43 km^{2})
  - Water: 0.23 sq mi (0.60 km^{2})
- Elevation: 1,322 ft (403 m)

Population (2020)
  - Total: 70
  - Density: 21.5/sq mi (8.31/km^{2})
- Time zone: UTC-6 (Central (CST))
  - Summer (DST): UTC-5 (CDT)
- ZIP code: 56484
- Area code: 218
- GNIS feature ID: 658974

Whipholt is an unincorporated community and census-designated place (CDP) in Pine Lake Township, Cass County, Minnesota, United States, along Leech Lake. As of the 2020 census, Whipholt had a population of 70. The community is located along State Highway 200 (MN 200) near Pine Lake Road. Whipholt is 13 miles east of Walker.

== Demographics ==
Historical population
Census	Pop.	Note	%±
2020	70		—
U.S. Decennial Census

== Education ==
The Walker-Hackensack-Akeley School District serves the CDP.
