= Tornado outbreak of February 13–14, 2000 =

Weather event in the United States

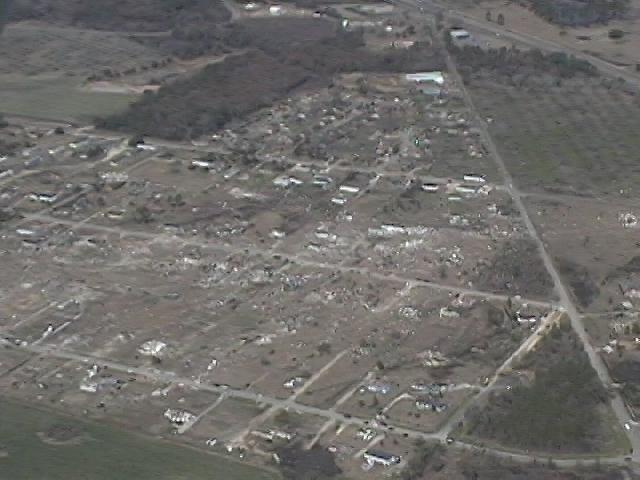
- An aerial shot of Goodson Mobile Home Park, which took a direct hit from an F3 tornado

Meteorological history
- Duration: February 13–14, 2000

Tornado outbreak
- Tornadoes: 17
- Max. rating: F3 tornado
- Duration: 14 hours, 7 minutes

Overall effects
- Casualties: 19 fatalities, 204 injuries
- Damage: >$20 million (2000 USD)
- Part of the tornado outbreaks of 2000

A significant tornado outbreak occurred across portions of the southeastern United States on February 13–14, 2000, producing 17 tornadoes and causing widespread damage across Georgia, Alabama, Florida, Tennessee, and the Carolinas. The outbreak was particularly severe in southwest Georgia, where a couple strong to intense tornadoes struck in and around communities, resulting in significant loss of life. At least 19 people were killed during the outbreak, making this event the deadliest tornado outbreak in the United States between May 1999 and November 2002.

The most notable impacts occurred during the late night hours of February 13, when intense, long-tracked tornadoes caused catastrophic damage to homes, mobile home communities, and agricultural areas in southwest Georgia. Additional tornadoes and damaging winds were reported across Florida and the Carolinas before the system moved eastward and eventually offshore into the Atlantic Ocean.

== Meteorological Synopsis ==
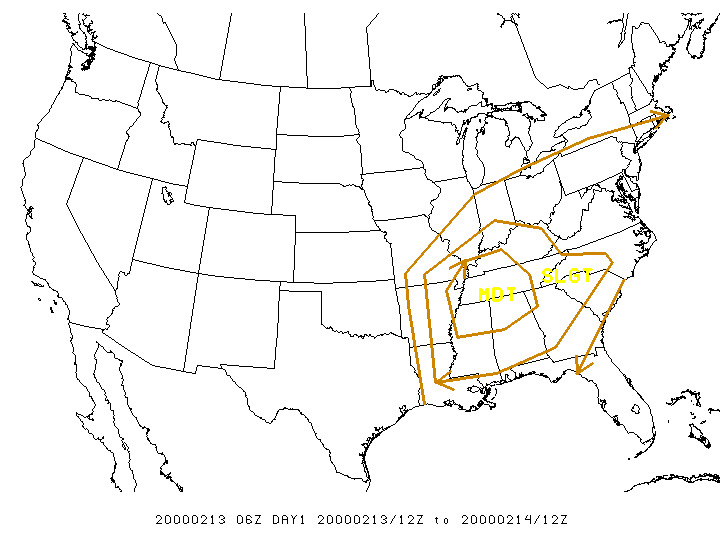
Storm Prediction Center Day 1 convective outlook on February 13 showing an moderate risk for the Deep South

On February 13, a significant severe weather episode unfolded across portions of the Southeastern United States as a strong upper-level trough advanced eastward from the southern Plains into the lower Mississippi and Tennessee valleys. By the morning hours, a negatively tilted mid-level trough was evident on water vapor imagery, accompanied by a powerful subtropical jet streak overspreading the Deep South, providing strong large-scale ascent across the region. This prompted the Storm Prediction Center to issue a moderate risk of severe weather. At the surface, a deepening low pressure system tracked northeastward from eastern Texas into the lower Ohio Valley, drawing a broad plume of maritime tropical air northward from the Gulf of Mexico into Alabama, Georgia, and northern Florida. Ahead of the surface low, a warm front lifted northward across southern Georgia and Alabama through the morning, while a trailing cold front advanced eastward from Mississippi. South of the warm front, surface dewpoints climbed into the mid to upper 60 °F (16 °C)s°F (18–20 °C), unseasonably high for mid-February, contributing to moderate instability despite limited diurnal heating. Forecast soundings and post-event analyses indicated mixed-layer CAPE values generally ranging from 1000 to locally over 1500 J/kg across southwest Georgia and adjacent portions of Alabama and Florida, sufficient to support sustained deep convection.

The kinematic environment was particularly favorable for tornadic supercells. Strengthening southerly flow at low levels beneath intense southwesterly mid-level winds produced strong vertical wind shear, with 0–6 km bulk shear values exceeding 50 kn (58 mph; 93 km/h) and pronounced curvature in hodographs near the warm frontal zone. Low-level helicity was locally enhanced where surface winds backed east-southeasterly north of the warm sector boundary, creating an environment supportive of long-lived, rotating updrafts.

Convective development began during the late evening hours as discrete thunderstorms formed ahead of the cold front and near the warm front across Alabama and Georgia. Rather than quickly evolving into a solid squall line, storms remained largely discrete for several hours, allowing individual supercells to intensify and persist. This storm mode, combined with strong low-level shear and favorable thermodynamic profiles, resulted in multiple tornadoes across southwest Georgia, including intense and long-track events that caused catastrophic damage in rural and semi-urban areas.

While the most intense impacts were concentrated in southwest Georgia, the broader severe weather threat extended across a much larger portion of the Southeast. Tornadoes and damaging winds were reported across parts of Alabama, Florida, Tennessee, and the Carolinas as the system progressed eastward into the evening and overnight hours. By February 14, the cold front had swept offshore, and increasing convective inhibition brought an end to the tornado threat.

== Confirmed Tornadoes ==
Confirmed tornadoes by Fujita rating
FU	F0	F1	F2	F3	F4	F5	Total
0	7	6	2	2	0	0	17

=== February 13 event ===
List of confirmed tornadoes – Sunday, February 13, 2000 (Note: All dates are based on the local time zone where the tornado touched down; however, all times are in Coordinated Universal Time for consistency.)
F#	Location	County / Parish	State	Start Coord.	Time (UTC)	Path length	Max width
F1	SW of Ada to NNE of Dublin	Montgomery	AL	32.0833°N 86.3°W	21:00–21:17	11.4 mi (18.3 km)	300 yd (270 m)
F1	This tornado tracked northeast across southern Montgomery County, damaging homes and mobile homes and snapping or uprooting hundreds of trees. The most severe damage occurred southwest of Davis Crossroads, where a manufacturing plant sustained significant structural damage. The tornado weakened and lifted about one mile west of US 231.						
F0	S of Mathews	Montgomery, Bullock	AL	32.1833°N 86.0167°W	21:30–21:35	3 mi (4.8 km)	100 yd (91 m)
F0	A weak tornado snapped and uprooted numerous trees.						
F0	N of Fitzpatrick	Bullock	AL	32.2333°N 85.8833°W	21:42–21:43	1 mi (1.6 km)	50 yd (46 m)
F0	This brief tornado damaged and uprooted several trees.						
F0	Northern Mayflower	Faulkner	AR	34.9667°N 92.45°W	22:52–22:55	2.2 mi (3.5 km)	40 yd (37 m)
F0	A tornado touched down northwest of Mayflower, producing mainly minor damage. As the tornado entered the northern portion of the city, decorative columns were torn from a home, windows were broken, and highway signs were knocked over. On the southwestern shore of Lake Conway, a bait and tackle shop had its windows blown out, roof sections were removed from a boat dock, and damage occurred to nearby boathouses. Several trees and power lines were also blown down before the tornado dissipated northeast of Mayflower.						
F2	N of Furlow to NW of DeValls Bluff	Lonoke, Prairie	AR	34.8833°N 91.9833°W	23:38–00:42	32.7 mi (52.6 km)	100 yd (91 m)
F2	This strong, long-track tornado developed north of Furlow, initially removing roof shingles from several homes and heavily damaging a farm shop before demolishing a mobile home in Fairview. The most intense damage occurred south of Woodlawn near the junction of AR 31 and AR 236, where two small houses and multiple grain bins were destroyed, vehicles and telephone equipment were damaged, and numerous power poles were blown down, resulting in two injuries. Farther east, near Carlisle along AR 13, an abandoned house and a mobile home were destroyed, additional homes were damaged, and dozens of power poles had to be replaced. The tornado then crossed into Prairie County, damaging or destroying barns and shop buildings in Center Point along AR 249. In this area, a mobile home was knocked off its foundation, a house was damaged by a fallen tree, and shingles were stripped from several roofs. As the tornado moved into the Wattensaw Wildlife Management Area, damage became mainly tree-related before the tornado weakened and dissipated.						
F1	Nashville	Davidson	TN	36.15°N 86.8667°W	00:04–00:15	4.3 mi (6.9 km)	200 yd (180 m)
F1	This tornado caused widespread damage across Nashville, impacting about fifty homes and twenty businesses along its path. Large trees were uprooted or snapped, including a hackberry tree that fell onto a house and an oak tree that crashed into the side of a building. A school trailer at St. Vincent de Paul School was destroyed, and multiple apartment buildings sustained roof damage. Numerous homes suffered roof damage, power lines were brought down, and debris was scattered throughout affected neighborhoods. The most severe damage occurred in parts of downtown Nashville, where the tornado carved a path with concentrated tree and structural damage. After crossing I-265, the tornado continued east-northeast, crossed the Cumberland River, and caused additional residential and commercial damage before weakening and dissipating in eastern portions of Nashville. One person was injured.						
F1	NE of Crystal Lake	Washington	FL	30.4667°N 85.6167°W	02:15	0.5 mi (0.80 km)	50 yd (46 m)
F1	A shed was damaged and one home and two farm buildings were destroyed.						
F1	SE of Sunny Hills	Washington	FL	30.5°N 85.5333°W	02:18–02:22	0.5 mi (0.80 km)	50 yd (46 m)
F1	A tornado struck the south and east sides of Porter Lake, destroying two mobile homes and overturning a pleasure boat on the lake. Numerous utility sheds and decks were demolished, with debris scattered across the area. Several small boats were lofted and blown into a nearby wooded area, adding to the concentrated damage around the lakeshore.						
F1	S of Vada	Decatur	GA	31.05°N 84.3833°W	04:19–04:25	0.2 mi (0.32 km)	50 yd (46 m)
F1	A tornado destroyed several homes near the intersection of SR 97 and SR 262. Numerous trees and power lines were also downed in the area. One person was injured after being struck by flying debris.						
F3	ENE of Branchville to E of Camilla	Mitchell	GA	31.1667°N 84.2667°W	04:42–05:03	9.2 mi (14.8 km)	300 yd (270 m)
F3	11 deaths – See section on this tornado – 175 people were injured.						

=== February 14 event ===
List of confirmed tornadoes – Monday, February 14, 2000
F#	Location	County / Parish	State	Start Coord.	Time (UTC)	Path length	Max width
F3	SW of Pelham to Northern Meigs to SSE of Cotton	Grady, Thomas, Mitchell	GA	31.0167°N 84.2°W	05:49–06:02	15 mi (24 km)	300 yd (270 m)
F3	7 deaths – See section on this tornado – 15 people were injured.						
F1	NW of Moultrie	Colquitt	GA	31.1833°N 83.85°W	06:21–06:27	2 mi (3.2 km)	50 yd (46 m)
F1	Numerous trees and power lines were downed and one home was damaged.						
F2	SE of Omega	Colquitt, Tift	GA	31.3167°N 83.6333°W	06:39–06:48	6 mi (9.7 km)	200 yd (180 m)
F2	1 death – A strong tornado moved through extreme northeast Colquitt County near Crosland, toppling numerous trees and power lines and damaging several mobile homes. One woman was killed when a large tree and another mobile home were blown into her residence. The tornado then crossed US 319 in extreme southwest Tift County just south of Omega, where destruction intensified. Twelve mobile homes and eight pre-fabricated homes were destroyed, and numerous frame homes were damaged, with some shifted off their block foundations. Trees and power lines were knocked down across the area, a school bus was blown into a nearby home just northeast of Omega. The tornado lifted to the east of town. Ten people were injured.						
F0	Lenox area	Cook	GA	31.2667°N 83.4667°W	07:30	Unknown	Unknown
F0	The county sheriff reported a brief tornado that did no damage.						
F0	SSE of Aiken	Aiken	SC	Unknown	10:10–10:12	0.2 mi (0.32 km)	50 yd (46 m)
F0	Minor damage occurred to trees.						
F0	Eastern Kinston	Lenoir	NC	35.2667°N 77.5833°W	11:00	0.1 mi (0.16 km)	5 yd (4.6 m)
F0	This very brief tornado knocked down numerous trees.						
F0	NW of Williamston	Martin	NC	35.85°N 77.0667°W	11:07	0.1 mi (0.16 km)	5 yd (4.6 m)
F0	The roof was blown off of a garage and the car inside of it was destroyed.						

=== Camilla, Georgia ===
Camilla, Georgia
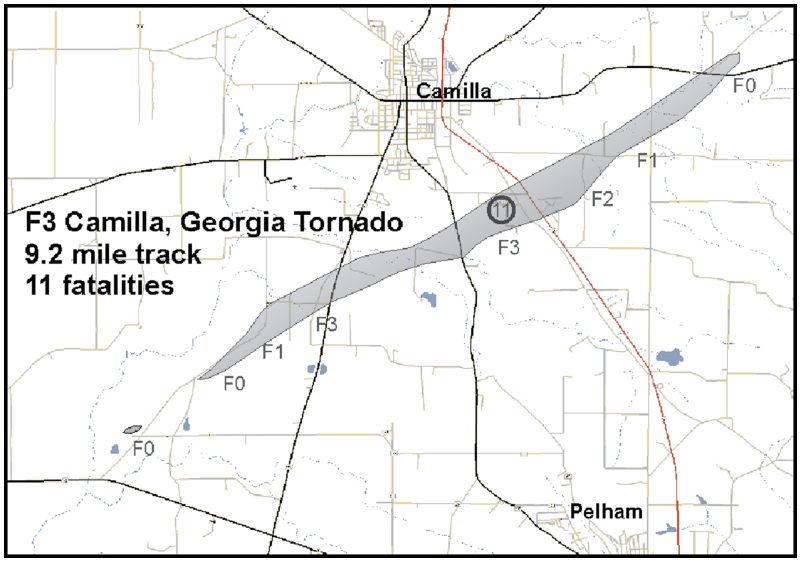
- A map of F3 tornado track that passed just south of the town of Camilla, GA.

Meteorological history
- Formed: February 13, 2000, 11:42 p.m. EST (UTC–05:00)
- Dissipated: February 14, 2000, 12:03 a.m. EST (UTC–05:00)
- Duration: 21 minutes

F3 tornado
- on the Fujita scale
- Highest winds: 158 mph (254 km/h)–206 mph (332 km/h)

Overall effects
- Fatalities: 11
- Injuries: 175

200 homes were destroyed, with 250 others damaged as the tornado tore through two subdivisions and four mobile home parks on the south edge of Camilla. Many power lines and hundreds of trees were downed. A trailer manufacturing plant was also destroyed. All fatalities were in mobile homes. 175 people were injured. Damage estimates were at $20 million.

=== Meigs, Georgia ===
Meigs, Georgia
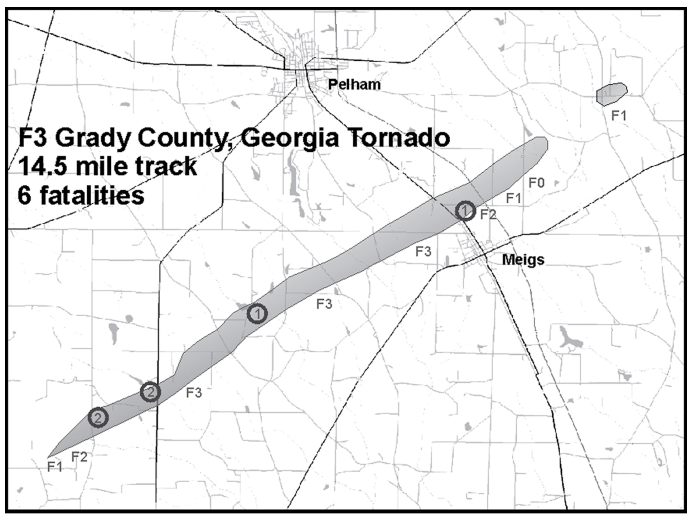
- A map of F3 tornado track that passed through northwestern Meigs, GA.

Meteorological history
- Formed: February 14, 2000, 12:49 a.m. EST (UTC–05:00)
- Dissipated: February 14, 2000, 01:02 a.m. EST (UTC–05:00)
- Duration: 13 minutes

F3 tornado
- on the Fujita scale
- Highest winds: 158 mph (254 km/h)–206 mph (332 km/h)

Overall effects
- Fatalities: 7
- Injuries: 15

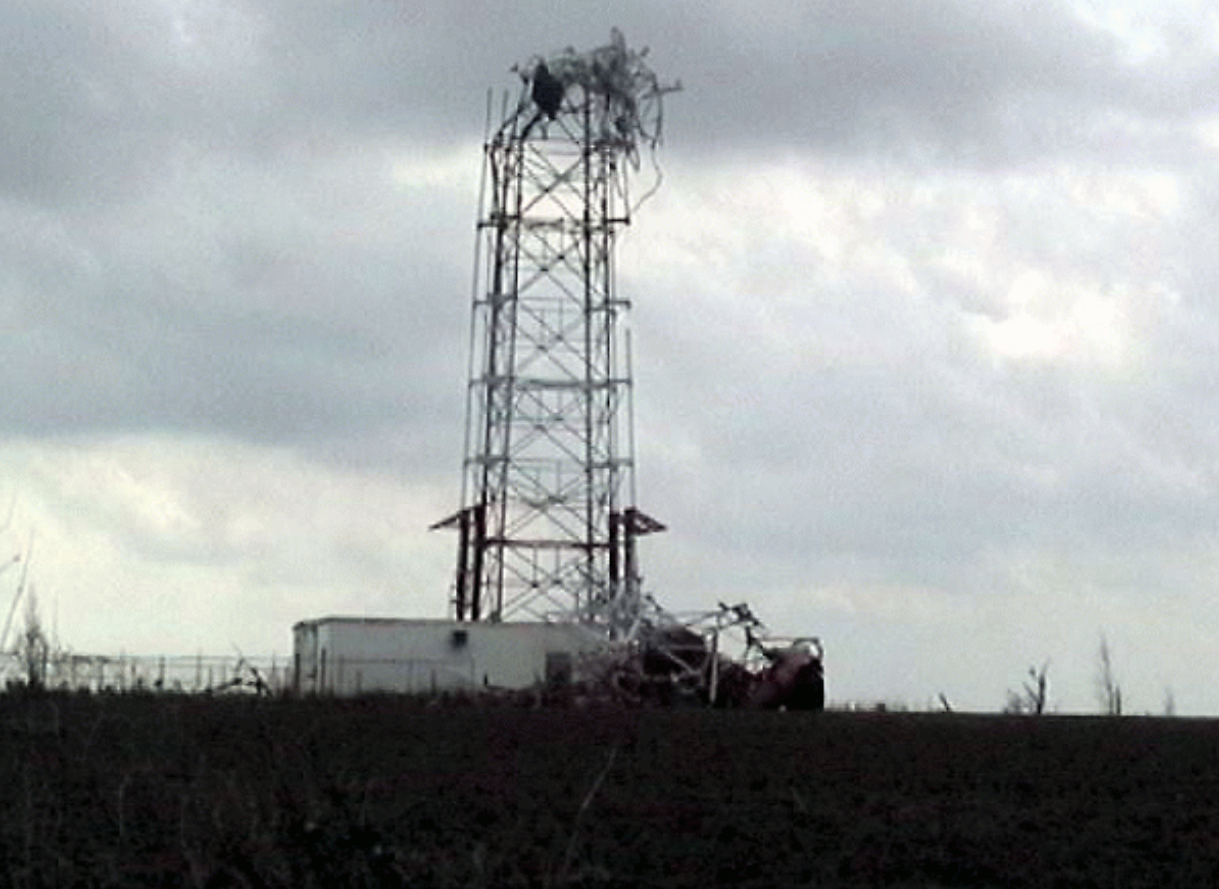
A microwave relay tower destroyed by the tornado just north of Meigs.

This deadly early morning tornado clipped the north side of Meigs. Fifteen homes were destroyed and numerous others were damaged. Eight chicken houses were flattened, killing a half million chickens. Hundreds of trees were snapped as well. 15 people were killed with around 175 people also being reported as injured.

== Impacts ==
=== Casualties and medical impact ===
Southwest Georgia in particular took the brunt of the impacts from this outbreak, especially within Mitchell, Grady and Colquitt counties. Early reports had the death toll above 20 before eventually being revised down to the final number of 19. The majority of the fatalities occurred in mobile homes when they were overturned or destroyed. An estimated 201 total injuries occurred in Georgia alone from the outbreak.

Across Southwest Georgia and surrounding areas, hospitals and clinics were overwhelmed due to the amount of overall casualties, leading to several hospitals reaching or exceeding their maximum capacity in their emergency rooms. Numerous patients were treated in hallways and other improvised spaces as the medical staff at the hospitals implemented emergency triage procedures. This was particularly true in small, rural hospitals with some patients from those hospitals being transferred to larger facilities for better care.

=== Structural damage and contributing factors ===
In and around Camilla, several hundred homes were either destroyed or deemed uninhabitable. The debris fields complicated search and rescue operations and displaced a large number of locals due to the extent of the debris in the area, especially within residential areas and roadways.

Mobile homes accounted for a disproportionate share of both damage and fatalities. Analysis from experts and reporting from local news voiced concerns about the stability of manufactured housing, including how numerous homes had major anchoring failures and little wind resistance. Both of those factors played a big role in the death and injury totals from the tornadoes.

While several tornado warnings were issued well in advance of the actual time the tornadoes occurred, many residents did not receive or act on alerts due to the late-night timing of the outbreak and limited access to NOAA weather radios.

Extensive economic and agricultural damages were also caused by the tornado outbreak, particularly in Southwest Georgia. Numerous orchards, farming equipment and local businesses were damaged or destroyed throughout the region.

== Aftermath ==
=== Emergency response and recovery ===
For several days, search and rescue operations occurred across Southwest Georgia as emergency crews, both local and national, sifted through the damaged neighborhoods. Temporary shelters were opened across the area for displaced residents. The American Red Cross, Salvation Army, and other local organizations and churches helped to distribute food, clothing, and other needed supplies. Local law enforcement agencies helped to secure areas with damage and prevent looting while utility crews worked to restore power and communications for the affected areas.

Across Georgia and other neighboring states, volunteer assistance began to arrive and set up coordination centers to help clean up and provide skilled labor to the hardest-hit areas. A significant role was played by churches and faith-based organizations by distributing meals, providing mental health support, helping with debris removal among other things. Nearby community institutions, especially the Mitchell County High School basketball team, helped to improve morale and to restore routine to the nearby communities.

On February 16th, Vice President Al Gore toured the damaged areas while on a campaign stop within Georgia. Gore pledged that the affected areas would receive federal assistance. Disaster declarations for the local area helped to enable emergency funding access, housing aid, and low-interest loans for residents and businesses. State and federal agencies established recovery centers to also assist residents in applying for aid and for damage assessments to their property.

=== Long-term rebuilding and continued effects ===
As the initial recovery efforts of removing debris and treating the injured concluded, the efforts shifted toward rebuilding in Camilla and surrounding areas long-term. Habitat for Humanity and other organizations helped to begin constructing permanent replacement homes, rather than mobile homes, and used charitable funding and volunteer labor.

The recovery unevenly progressed. Some residents were fortunate and able to return to rebuilt homes while others remained homeless due to funding limitations, administrative delays or insurance disputes. Federal agencies and Mitchell County officials eventually had disagreements over reimbursements for the cleanup and improper allocation of aid money, leading to appeals and continued negotiations between the federal and local governments.

The rebuilding and recovery continued into early 2001. Locals began to commemorate the events of the prior year while faith-based and civic organizations continued to help in long-term support efforts. The anniversary coverage from local news made note of how the recovery had progressed and also the lingering challenges that continue to be present for the surrounding area's residents.

== See also ==
- Tornadoes of 2000
- List of tornadoes and tornado outbreaks
  - List of North American tornadoes and tornado outbreaks
- Tornado outbreak of February 28 – March 2, 2007
- Tornado outbreak of January 21–23, 2017 – Larger tornado outbreak that took place in the same region.
