= 2000 Xenia tornado =

2000 F4 tornado in Xenia, Ohio

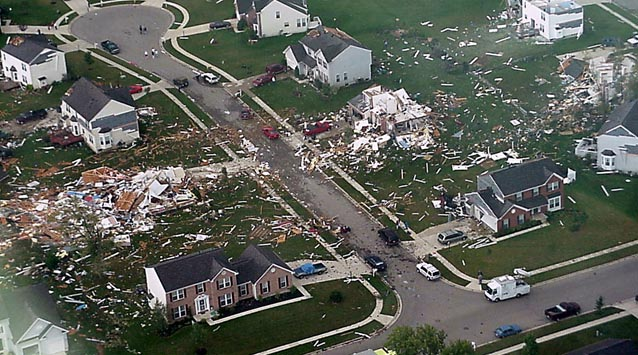
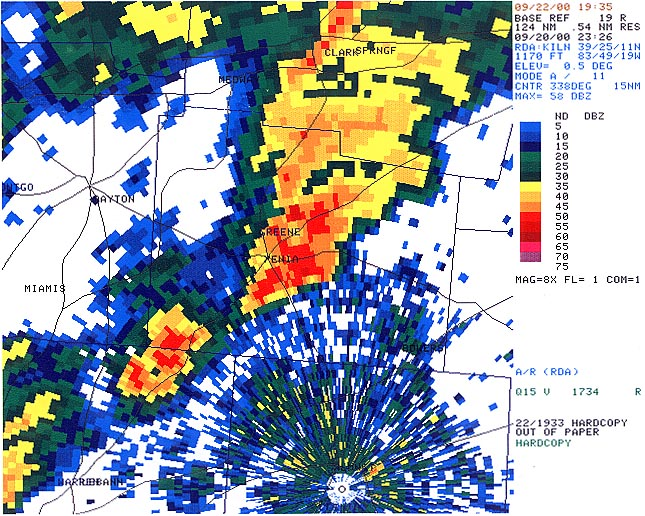
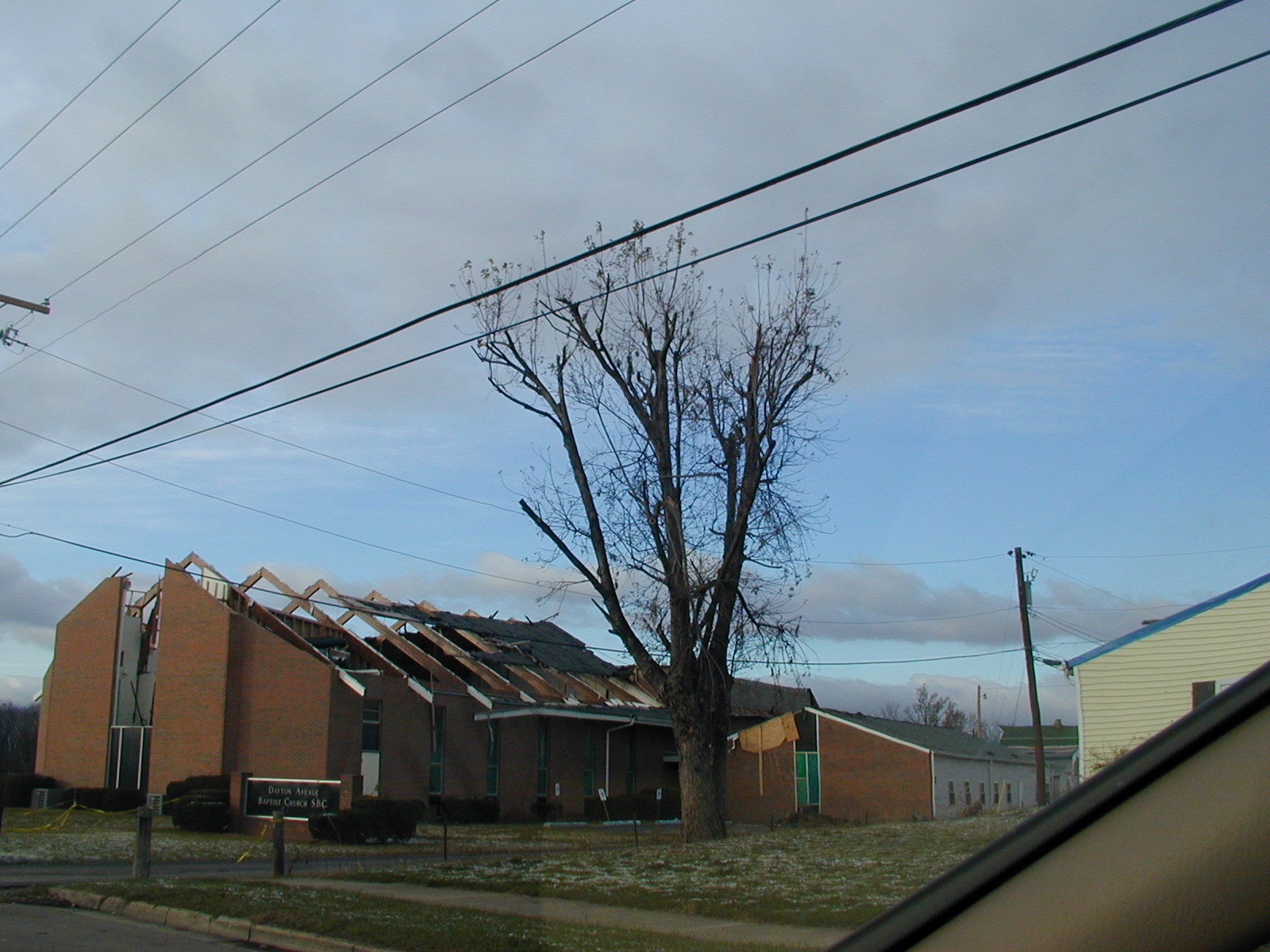
- Clockwise from top: Significant damage to homes in Xenia following the tornado; remnants of tornadic damage to the Dayton Avenue Baptist Church; a reflectivity scan of the tornado as it was impacting Xenia

Meteorological history
- Formed: September 20, 2000, 7:18 p.m. EDT (UTC–04:00)
- Dissipated: September 20, 2000, 7:26 p.m. EDT (UTC–04:00)
- Duration: 8 minutes

F4 tornado
- on the Fujita scale
- Max width: 500 yd (460 m)
- Path length: 9 mi (14 km)
- Highest winds: ≥207 mph (333 km/h)

Overall effects
- Fatalities: 1
- Injuries: 100
- Damage: $15 million (2000 USD)
- Areas affected: Greene County, Ohio, particularly Xenia, Ohio
- Part of the Tornadoes of 2000

During the evening of September 20, 2000, a short-lived yet violent tornado touched down in Greene County, Ohio, and proceeded to track directly towards the town of Xenia. Moving at a forward pace exceeding 65 MPH, the tornado moved directly into the western portion of Xenia, where it would damage or destroy several homes, kill one person, and cause numerous injuries along a 9 mi (14 km) path. This tornado was the first violent (F4+) tornado to hit Xenia since 1974, when a catastrophic and fatal F5 tornado moved directly through downtown, directly killing 32 and injuring 1,150. In addition, it was the first violent-rated tornado in the month of September in the United States since 1986. Safety actions and preparations taken by the city of Xenia prior to the event were highly criticized, after only a single siren located in the town sounded as the tornado approached.

== Meteorological synopsis ==
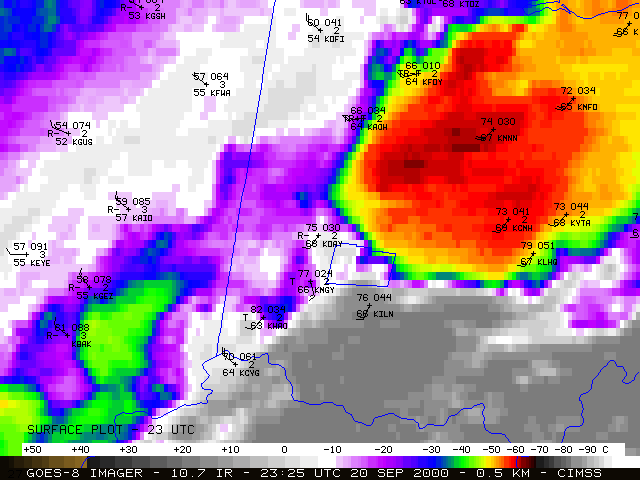
Satellite imagery of the storm that caused the 2000 Xenia Tornado. Provided courtesy of Cooperative Institute for Meteorological Satellite Studies, University of Wisconsin-Madison

A large air mass over southwest Ohio was recovering from a convective outflow boundary in September 2000. The weather instability created via this event caused a squall line (Note: A squall line is a line of thunderstorms, usually accompanying a cold front.) to develop in Indiana which traveled into Ohio on the 20th of September. Then, later that day at 7:20 PM EDT, the squall line passed over Xenia and the 2000 Xenia tornado touched down.

== Tornado summary ==
The tornado first touched down near a golf course located southwest of the Greene County Airport, and it would begin to track to the northeast, heading directly for Xenia. Ground scouring (Note: "Ground scouring" refers to dirt or other material being ripped out of the ground by a tornado, typically producing a visible path.) was noted as the tornado moved towards Xenia, and the tornado exhibited frequent "skipping" as it damaged trees and other structures it impacted. A home located on Van Eaton Road near Xenia was damaged as the tornado moved over; several outbuildings nearby were also heavily damaged. As the tornado continued to move to the northeast, it would cross an overpass that connects Highway 35 and several cars that were stopped over the overpass were lofted in the air and thrown into ditches. A short distance to the north, the tornado would continue to produce deep ground scouring as it moved over crop fields.

The tornado would then cross over Hedger Street, where a Walmart was damaged and several other businesses sustained some degree of damage. A tire store located on Hedger Street was directly impacted, and as a result was almost completely destroyed. The tornado would continue to damage structures as it moved toward Xenia while retaining an estimated forward speed of 65 miles per hour (105 km/h). As the tornado struck a fairground northwest of Xenia, it reached its maximum width of 400 yards (370 m) while heavily damaging rows of homes at F3 intensity. A home a short distance to the north was destroyed at F4 intensity, an intensity that the tornado briefly retained.

Moments after striking more homes, a row of businesses were directly struck by the tornado and completely destroyed. Four trailers that were located in adjacent parking lots were tossed by the tornado and one was found 400 yards (370 m) away on the fairgrounds. It would continue to damage several structures as it moved out of Xenia, and dissipated to the northeast after being on the ground for 9 miles (14 km). One person was killed, and 110 others would be injured by the tornado.

== Aftermath ==
=== Damage and casualties ===
One person was killed when the tornado moved over the fairgrounds and subsequently downing a tree, which fell on a man who later died. Over 100 people were injured by the tornado, and fifteen people were admitted to the Miami Valley Hospital for injuries ranging from broken bones to head wounds. One person who was injured was in critical condition but would recover.

Xenia suffered heavy damage from the tornado, which inflicted some form of damage to an estimated 300 businesses located along the tornado's 9 miles (14 km) path. An additional 30 homes would be destroyed as the tornado moved over, and the only Walmart located within Xenia was heavily damaged. In Sugarcreek Township, fourteen homes were damaged and crops were ripped out of the ground while the tornado retained a narrow path. Deep cyclonic ground scouring produced by the tornado was documented during damage surveys, and was highly visible from the air. 10,000 people suffered power outages in the immediate aftermath of the tornado. Governor Bob Taft would declare a state of emergency for Xenia immediately following the event.

=== Siren controversy ===
After the 1974 tornado, five tornado sirens were located across the city to warn residents of an oncoming tornado. When the 2000 tornado hit the town, only one of these sirens would be functional; the tornado had cut power to four of the sirens. An assessment conducted after the tornado concluded that authorities in Xenia had failed to activate the sirens within time, and as a result only one was sounded. In 2022, a resolution was set in place to add more sirens in the town, and to update existing ones.

== Notes and references ==
=== Sources ===
- National Weather Service (February 2024). "State of Ohio Enhanced Hazard Mitigation Plan" (PDF). State of Ohio.
