= Pine Lake (Alberta) =

Lake in Alberta, Canada

- Location within Alberta
- Location: Red Deer County, Alberta
- Coordinates: 52°05′19″N 113°26′33″W
- Basin countries: Canada
- Max. length: 5.4 km (3.4 mi)
- Max. width: 4.6 km (2.9 mi)
- Surface area: 3.89 km^{2} (1.50 sq mi)
- Average depth: 5.3 m (17 ft)
- Max. depth: 12.2 m (40 ft)
- Surface elevation: 891 m (2,923 ft)
- Settlements: Pine Lake
- References: Pine Lake

Pine Lake is a lake in Alberta.

Pine Lake is drained by Ghostpine Creek which eventually empties out into the Red Deer River. The lake is very rich in plant life which gives it fish. Some of the fish in this lake are northern pike, walleye, yellow perch and burbot. It is located 25 kilometers southeast of Red Deer, and is most notable for the Pine Lake tornado that struck the hamlet of Pine Lake in 2000.

In ancient times, Pine Lake was one of the favorite camping spots for various bands of First Nations. In 1754, the famous explorer Anthony Henday made his first contact with the Blackfoot First Nation at a very large and impressive encampment at the Lake.

Unfortunately, as the years went by, the area also became the site of raids and battles, usually between the Crees and the Blackfeet.

According to one story, a band of Blackfeet surprised a band of Crees at the Lake and killed everyone in the camp. After the massacre, the First Nations said that the Lake was inhabited by the ghosts of the murdered tribesmen. Hence, the Lake became known as Ghost Pine or Devil’s Pine Lake and for a long time was avoided by traveling natives.

The first settlement began at the Lake in the early 1890s.

The earliest settlers were cattle ranchers, attracted by the abundant grass, good water and rolling countryside. Many of these settlers came out from England, giving the district a distinctive ‘Old Country’ atmosphere.

The first record of Ghost Pine Lake being used as resort dates from July 1892, when Mr. and Mrs. Thomas Wells organized a picnic for 20 at the Lake.

Robert Page took several out in what was described by the Calgary Herald as his yacht, but which was actually just a small boat. Some of the men spotted a cinnamon bear, but were unable to catch up to it or to shoot it.

Unfortunately, much of the 1890s were very cold and very dry, which greatly reduced the attractiveness of the Lake for either new settlers or summer tourists.

A very bad prairie fire struck in May 1894 and claimed several homes as well as a great deal of livestock, farm implements and hay for the animals.
