= Pine Lake (Rusk County, Wisconsin) =

- Location within Wisconsin
- Location: Rusk and Chippewa Counties, Wisconsin
- Coordinates: 45.291°N 91.458°W
- Type: lake
- Surface area: 256 acres (104 ha)
- Max. depth: 106 feet (32 m)
- Surface elevation: 1,101 feet (336 m)

Pine Lake is a lake in Rusk and Chippewa Counties, Wisconsin. It has a surface area of 256 acres (104 ha) and is surrounded by a forest. The maximum depth of the lake is 106 feet (32 m). Pine Lake is at an elevation of 1,101 feet (336 m). The bottom of the lake is 50% sand, 30% gravel, 15% rock, and 5% muck. Pine Lake is a seepage lake, it's spring fed with only one outlet. Its water mostly from precipitation or runoff. Because of this, water levels tend to fluctuate seasonally.

== Wildlife ==
Largemouth bass are the most common fish in the lake, which also contains panfish and northern pike in smaller quantities. Loons, turtles, snakes, beavers, bears, deer, chipmunks, and rabbits are also found in the surrounding area.

== Homes ==
Pine Lake has houses on about half its shoreline, with about 40 houses near the lake. The houses were built by a few men from Chicago who bought the land.
