= Pine Lake (Chisago County, Minnesota) =

Lake in the state of Minnesota, United States

Pine Lake may refer to two separate lakes in Chisago County, Minnesota

- Pine Lake in Nessel Township was named for the white pines near the lake shore.45°19′44″N 92°50′59″W
- Pine Lake. 45°19.75′N 92°51′W

== See also ==
- List of lakes in Minnesota
