= Salvation Army camps in Canada =

Coordinates: 48.3983°N 53.9316°W

The Salvation Army has maintained camps in various locations throughout Canada. While some of these sites have ceased operation over the years, many are still in operation.

== Active camps ==
Camp Sunrise is a camp near Gibsons in British Columbia. Captain Fraser Morrison and Colonel Arch Layman first scouted out the area and chose the grounds for the camp in 1925. The Salvation Army runs week-long holiday camps at Sunrise throughout the summer.

Camp Mountainview is 19 kilometers west of Houston on Highway 16 in British Columbia, Canada It has been operating in Northern BC since 1985 and is a place of refuge, fun and growth for campers of all ages. It offers a northern cultural experience for its campers and staff.

Pine Lake Camp (PLC) is in Pine Lake, Alberta. The Salvation Army commenced its camping ministry at Pine Lake in 1958. PLC shares the shoreline of Pine Lake with a number of other camps and campgrounds; including Pine Lake Christian Camp, Camp BB - Riback and Green Acres Campground. The Pine Lake tornado of 2000 did not damage PLC or BB, but did significant damage at Green Acres. Pine Lake Camp has a trailer park that can service 16 trailers at once. Its largest building is Evergreen Lodge, which contains 16 bedrooms and a common room. From September to June, the camp is rented out for school groups, business and government retreats, and family and church retreats. During July and August, there is a full-time camp staff that organizes seven-week-long camps for children and teenagers. Registration for the camps is subsidized by The Salvation Army.

Beaver Creek Camp is 15 km south of Saskatoon, just east of Highway 219. The 100 acre campgrounds consist of seven cabins, a dining hall, an auditorium, nature trails, a baseball diamond, a sports court, a heated outdoor pool, a playground, a trampoline, a fire pit, and an amphitheatre.

Newport Adventure Camp is on Skeleton Lake in Muskoka, Ontario, Canada, about 15 kilometres (9 mi) from Huntsville. The camp is over 40 acres (16.2 ha) in size and consists of five cabins and 7 Teepees to house campers. The summer program includes swimming and ropes during the afternoon. The ropes course includes a zipline, bridges, a swinging log, nitro crossing, cargo net, and Bermuda triangle. There is also an outdoor adventures program involving hiking, archery, and a meal in the outdoors. Water adventures also runs consisting of water sports, canoeing, kayaking and swimming. Electives occur once a week, which provide opportunities of sports, crafts, drama, cooking, and music/rhythm. The camp is equipped with a basketball court, a volleyball court, a baseball diamond and a chapel.

Jackson's Point Camp & Conference Centre is located near the summer resort harbour at Lake Simcoe in Jackson's Point, Ontario. The campgrounds were first purchased by The Salvation Army in 1917, but the Army ran summer camps on the grounds for nearly a decade before. Hugh Garner, a Canadian novelist, recalled having responded to a call to the mercy seat when attending a summer camp at Jackson's Point as a child, even though he became openly anti-Christian and strongly opposed to the idea of a personal god later in life. In recent years, The Salvation Army has split the summer camps by age group, placing the 7 to 10-year-olds in summer camps at Jackson's Point and placing the older children at Camp Newport.

Scotian Glen Camp is in Thorburn, Pictou County, Nova Scotia, Canada. In addition to summer camps offered by The Salvation Army, Scotian Glen is rented by several different organizations for specialized camps. One such organization is the Nova Scotia Lifeguard Service which hosts a training camp there. On 26 May 2008, Premier Rodney MacDonald and Community Services Minister Judy Streatch presented a cheque for $825,000 to The Salvation Army for use in addressing the infrastructure needs of Scotian Glen, Spryfield Family Resource Centre, and Booth Centre.

Camp Starrigan is in Musgravetown, Newfoundland and Labrador, Canada.

== Former camps ==
Seba Beach was a Salvation Army camp in Alberta, Canada from 1937-1957.

Sandy Hook was a Salvation Army camp in Manitoba, Canada from around 1925 to 1975. It was replaced by Camp Woodlands in 1976.

Camp Woodlands was a Salvation Army camp in Manitoba, Canada from 1976-2007.

Camp Glenhuron was a Salvation Army camp in Bayfield, Bluewater, Huron County, Ontario, Canada.

Camp Madawaska is a former Salvation Army camp in Nipissing District Ontario, Canada, near the entrance to Algonquin Provincial Park. It was named after the Madawaska River as the Opeongo River, one of its tributaries, flows through the camp. The main lake on the property was Victoria. Two islands are in the lake, known by the former caretaker of the property as The Big Island (Weston Island) and The Small Island (Brownsea Island).

Camp Madawaska was owned by Edward Curtis Smith's family. Edward kept a 4-inch Clark portable telescope at the camp. Soon after World War II, the Smiths sold the camp, along with the telescope, to Garfield Weston, owner of the Canadian company, George Weston Limited. When Weston died, he bequeathed the camp to the Salvation Army. For the following years, it was used as a camp for inner-city kids for most of the summer and was also rented for various retreats. Salvation Army Scout and Guide groups made frequent use of the camp. Week-long camps were held each summer and weekend camps occurred in spring, summer, and fall. A 12-day Scout camp was held (1986?) that was attended by Scouts from the U.S., England, and from Canada. Camps were usually held at Camp Madawaska from May until October and sites around Lake Victoria could be rented at any time during those months. The camp was returned to Weston ownership in 2005. The remaining camp Camp Rainbow, which served teenagers after they became too old for the Camp at Jackson's Point (Camp Wabana). This group was transferred to Camp Newport and continues to operate there. The grounds include 32,000 acres (130 km^{2}) of land, much forest and wildlife, nine lakes, and several lodges and cabins. Common activities include swimming, camping, biking, and hiking. Camp sites used included: The Paddock, Folke's Point, Gilwell Beach, South Bay (chalet), multiple camp sites on Weston Island, and one site on Brownsea Island.

Camp Selkirk was a Salvation Army camp in Selkirk, Ontario, Canada from 1948 to 2004.

Roblin Lake Camp was a Salvation Army camp in Ameliasburg, Ontario, serving east-central Ontario from Whitby (in the west) to Gananonque (in the east) to Fenelon Falls (in the north). It operated for about eighty years before closing in 2007. Roblin Lake Camp had historically been supported by the local government. Such politicians as Senator William Alexander Fraser donated extensively to the camp's activities. In 1976, members of CFB Trenton donated $2700 to the camp. The Rotary Club of Picton in Prince Edward County contributed $550 to The Salvation Army in order to pay the registration for three children to attend a Roblin Lake summer camp in 2006. The Kiwanis Club of Trenton contributed annually toward the registration fees for underprivileged children from the Trenton, Ontario area to benefit from the camping experience.

From its inception, Roblin Lake Camp has held week-long non-profit camps for underprivileged children ages 7–12 every summer, namely "Fresh Air camp, Holiday camp and Adventure camp. Campers took part in activities such as drama, canoeing, arts and crafts, and swimming. Other week-long summer camps for children included music camp, moms & kid's camp, and Pioneer Club camp. A special guest was invited to the music camp each year. Several well-known musicians were guests at the camp, notably Major Joy Webb and David Catherwood. men's and women's camps, and seniors' camp were also held. Facilities at Roblin Lake included a basketball court, a baseball field, an outdoor swimming pool, and a miniature golf course. foosball, archery, shuffleboard, boating, volleyball, air hockey, and street hockey were common recreational activities played throughout the summer.

Camp Lac de l'Achigan was a Salvation Army camp in Quebec, Canada from 1933 to 2020.

Northern Arm was a Salvation Army camp in Newfoundland, Canada from 1960 to 1987. It was replaced by Twin Ponds Camp in 1988.

Twin Ponds Camp was a camp next to the Trans-Canada Highway between Glenwood and Lewisporte in Newfoundland and Labrador, Canada. Twin Ponds was rented by various organizations for specialized camps throughout the year. Two such organizations were the Canadian Cancer Society and the Rug Hooking Guild of Newfoundland and Labrador.

Silver Birches was a camp approximately 25 kilometres east of Corner Brook, Newfoundland. During the September 11 attacks, US Airways flight 741 was diverted to Gander International Airport and its occupants spent three days at Silver Birches before alternate arrangements were made for their departures. The camp was demolished in 2016.
