= Pine Lake Park =

Pine Lake Park may refer to:

- Pine Lake Park, New Jersey, a community
- Pine Lake Park (San Francisco), a park
