= Pine Lake (Cass County, Minnesota) =

Lake in the state of Minnesota, United States

- Location within Minnesota
- Location: Cass County, Minnesota
- Coordinates: 47°1.5′N 94°23′W
- Type: lake
- Average depth: 12 ft (3.7 m)
- Max. depth: 25 ft (7.6 m)

Pine Lake is a lake in Cass County, Minnesota, in the United States.

Pine Lake was named from the white pine trees lining the lake.

== See also ==
- List of lakes in Minnesota
