= Pine Lake Township, Clearwater County, Minnesota =

Township in Minnesota, United States

Pine Lake Township
- Township
- Location of Pine Lake Township, within Clearwater County, Minnesota
- Coordinates: 47°43′3″N 95°31′5″W
- Country: United States
- State: Minnesota
- County: Clearwater

Area
  - Total: 34.3 sq mi (88.8 km^{2})
  - Land: 31.8 sq mi (82.3 km^{2})
  - Water: 2.5 sq mi (6.5 km^{2})
- Elevation: 1,280 ft (390 m)

Population (2020)
  - Total: 447
  - Density: 14.1/sq mi (5.43/km^{2})
- Time zone: UTC-6 (Central (CST))
  - Summer (DST): UTC-5 (CDT)
- ZIP code: 56644
- Area code: 218
- FIPS code: 27-51190
- GNIS feature ID: 0665306

Pine Lake Township is a township in Clearwater County, Minnesota, United States. The population was 447 at the 2020 census.

== History ==
Pine Lake Township was organized in 1897. The township took its name from Pine Lake.

== Geography ==
According to the United States Census Bureau, the township has a total area of 34.3 square miles (88.8 km^{2}), of which 31.8 square miles (82.3 km^{2}) is land and 2.5 square miles (6.5 km^{2}) (7.29%) is water.

== Demographics ==
As of the census of 2000, there were 324 people, 139 households, and 99 families residing in the township. The population density was 10.2 people per square mile (3.9/km^{2}). There were 255 housing units at an average density of 8.0/sq mi (3.1/km^{2}). The racial makeup of the township was 98.77% White, 0.93% Native American, and 0.31% from two or more races.

There were 139 households, out of which 23.7% had children under the age of 18 living with them, 64.7% were married couples living together, 3.6% had a female householder with no husband present, and 28.1% were non-families. 24.5% of all households were made up of individuals, and 10.1% had someone living alone who was 65 years of age or older. The average household size was 2.33 and the average family size was 2.79.

In the township the population was spread out, with 20.1% under the age of 18, 5.2% from 18 to 24, 23.8% from 25 to 44, 34.3% from 45 to 64, and 16.7% who were 65 years of age or older. The median age was 45 years. For every 100 females, there were 109.0 males. For every 100 females age 18 and over, there were 107.2 males.

The median income for a household in the township was $32,500, and the median income for a family was $41,429. Males had a median income of $23,438 versus $19,167 for females. The per capita income for the township was $17,815. About 13.3% of families and 15.7% of the population were below the poverty line, including 5.6% of those under age 18 and 28.9% of those age 65 or over.
