= Pine Lake (Otter Tail County, Minnesota) =

Lake in the state of Minnesota, United States

- Location within Minnesota
- Location: Otter Tail County, Minnesota
- Coordinates: 46°32′35″N 95°46′44″W
- Type: lake

Pine Lake is a lake in Otter Tail County, in the U.S. state of Minnesota.

Pine Lake was named for the white pine trees near the lake shore.

== See also ==
- List of lakes in Minnesota
