= Pine Lake (Clearwater County, Minnesota) =

Lake in Clearwater County, Minnesota

- Location within Minnesota
- Location: Clearwater County, Minnesota
- Coordinates: 47°41′37″N 95°31′34″W
- Type: lake

Pine Lake is a lake in Clearwater County, Minnesota, in the United States.

Pine Lake was named for the forests of white and Norway pines which were cleared by early settlers.

== See also ==
- List of lakes in Minnesota
