= Pine Lake Township, Cass County, Minnesota =

Pine Lake Township, Minnesota
- Township
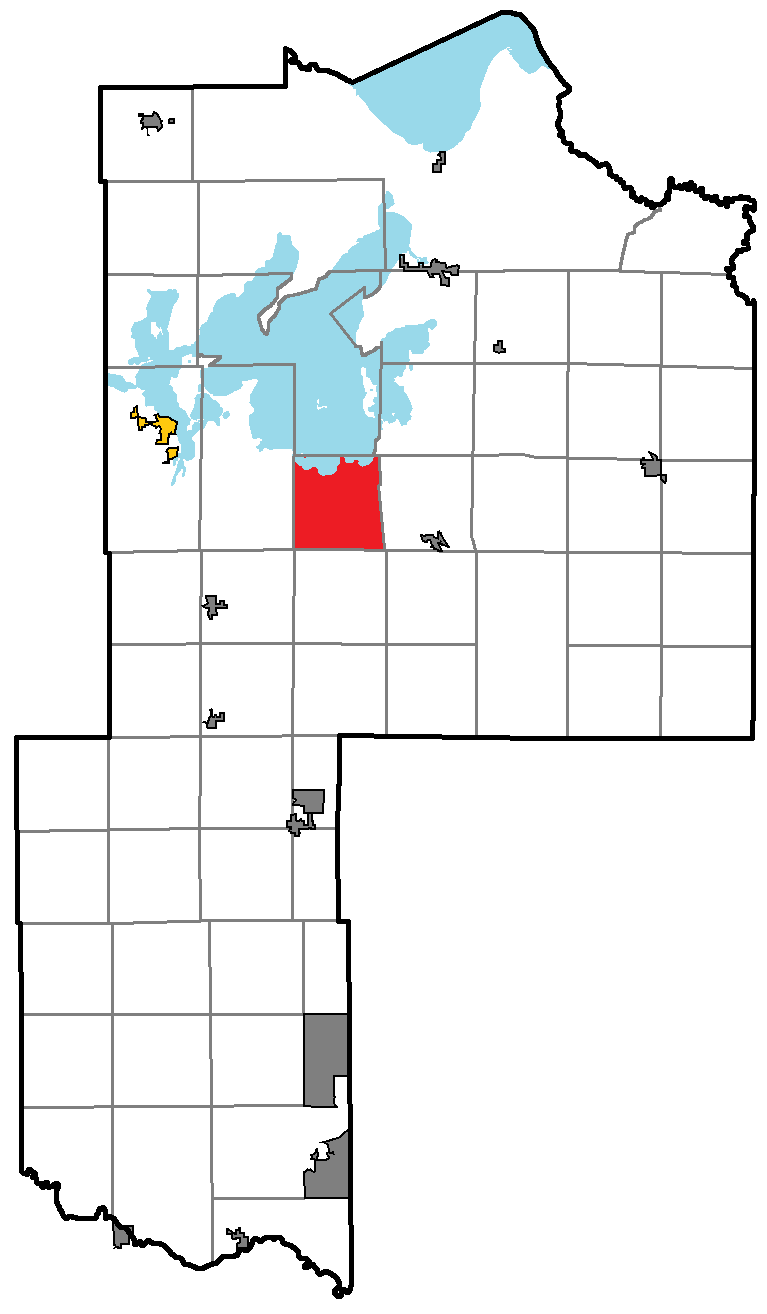
- Location of Pine River Township, within Cass County, Minnesota
- Coordinates: 47°2′16″N 94°20′36″W
- Country: United States
- State: Minnesota
- County: Cass

Area
  - Total: 34.4 sq mi (89.1 km^{2})
  - Land: 28.5 sq mi (73.7 km^{2})
  - Water: 5.9 sq mi (15.4 km^{2})
- Elevation: 1,440 ft (440 m)

Population (2020)
  - Total: 193
  - Density: 6.78/sq mi (2.62/km^{2})
- Time zone: UTC-6 (Central (CST))
  - Summer (DST): UTC-5 (CDT)
- FIPS code: 27-51172
- GNIS feature ID: 0665305

Pine Lake Township is a township in Cass County, Minnesota, United States. The population was 193 as of the 2020 census. This township took its name from Pine Lake.

== Geography ==
According to the United States Census Bureau, the township has a total area of 34.4 square miles (89.1 km^{2}), of which 28.4 square miles (73.7 km^{2}) is land and 6.0 square miles (15.4 km^{2}) (17.33%) is water.

=== Unincorporated communities ===
- Whipholt

=== Major highway ===
- Minnesota State Highway 200

=== Lakes ===
- Baby Lake (north edge)
- Barnum Lake (north half)
- Cedar Lake
- Cranberry Lake
- Emery Lake
- Goose Lake
- Hagen Lake
- Haynes Lake
- Hazel Lake
- Horseshoe Lake
- Lauer Lake
- Leech Lake (south edge)
- Little Silver Lake (west edge)
- Mann Lake (north edge)
- Moccasin Lake
- Mud Lake
- North Stocking Lake
- Oak Lake
- Pine Lake
- Pollywog Lake
- Popple Lake
- Rat Lake
- South Stocking Lake
- Silver Lake (vast majority)
- Spearns Lake
- Tepee Lake (east half)
- Twin Lakes
- Wawa Lake
- Weed Lake

=== Adjacent townships ===
- Boy Lake Township (northeast)
- Kego Township (east)
- Woodrow Township (south)
- Birch Lake Township (southwest)
- Turtle Lake Township (west)

== Demographics ==
As of the census of 2000, there were 170 people, 81 households, and 52 families residing in the township. The population density was 6.0 people per square mile (2.3/km^{2}). There were 262 housing units at an average density of 9.2/sq mi (3.6/km^{2}). The racial makeup of the township was 88.24% White, 4.71% Native American, 1.18% Asian, and 5.88% from two or more races. Hispanic or Latino of any race were 1.18% of the population.

There were 81 households, out of which 17.3% had children under the age of 18 living with them, 59.3% were married couples living together, 4.9% had a female householder with no husband present, and 34.6% were non-families. 28.4% of all households were made up of individuals, and 8.6% had someone living alone who was 65 years of age or older. The average household size was 2.10 and the average family size was 2.57.

In the township the population was spread out, with 14.1% under the age of 18, 2.9% from 18 to 24, 18.8% from 25 to 44, 40.0% from 45 to 64, and 24.1% who were 65 years of age or older. The median age was 52 years. For every 100 females, there were 109.9 males. For every 100 females age 18 and over, there were 114.7 males.

The median income for a household in the township was $41,250, and the median income for a family was $51,667. Males had a median income of $30,156 versus $28,875 for females. The per capita income for the township was $22,201. About 4.3% of families and 15.0% of the population were below the poverty line, including 39.4% of those under the age of eighteen and 22.6% of those 65 or over.
