= Pine Lake Township, Otter Tail County, Minnesota =

Pine Lake Township, Minnesota
- Township
- Location of Pine Lake Township, within Otter Tail County, Minnesota

- Location within the state of Minnesota Pine Lake Township, Minnesota (the United States)
- Coordinates: 46°35′55″N 95°28′29″W
- Country: United States
- State: Minnesota
- County: Otter Tail

Area
  - Total: 35.8 sq mi (92.6 km^{2})
  - Land: 29.2 sq mi (75.5 km^{2})
  - Water: 6.6 sq mi (17.0 km^{2})
- Elevation: 1,332 ft (406 m)

Population (2020)
  - Total: 773
  - Density: 26.5/sq mi (10.2/km^{2})
- Time zone: UTC-6 (Central (CST))
  - Summer (DST): UTC-5 (CDT)
- FIPS code: 27-51208
- GNIS feature ID: 0665307
- Website: https://www.pinelaketownshipotcmn.gov/

Pine Lake Township is a township in Otter Tail County, Minnesota, United States. The population was 773 at the 2020 census.

Pine Lake Township was organized in 1883, and named for Pine Lake.

== Geography ==
According to the United States Census Bureau, the township has a total area of 35.7 square miles (92.6 km^{2}), of which 29.2 square miles (75.5 km^{2}) is land and 6.6 square miles (17.0 km^{2}) (18.38%) is water.

== Demographics ==
As of the census of 2000, there were 656 people, 252 households, and 187 families residing in the township. The population density was 22.5 people per square mile (8.7/km^{2}). There were 563 housing units at an average density of 19.3/sq mi (7.5/km^{2}). The racial makeup of the township was 99.39% White, 0.15% Asian, and 0.46% from two or more races.

There were 252 households, out of which 32.9% had children under the age of 18 living with them, 65.1% were married couples living together, 4.8% had a female householder with no husband present, and 25.4% were non-families. 20.2% of all households were made up of individuals, and 8.7% had someone living alone who was 65 years of age or older. The average household size was 2.58 and the average family size was 2.99.

In the township the population was spread out, with 26.4% under the age of 18, 6.3% from 18 to 24, 24.7% from 25 to 44, 29.0% from 45 to 64, and 13.7% who were 65 years of age or older. The median age was 41 years. For every 100 females, there were 104.4 males. For every 100 females age 18 and over, there were 104.7 males.

The median income for a household in the township was $43,056, and the median income for a family was $50,938. Males had a median income of $34,063 versus $22,875 for females. The per capita income for the township was $19,878. About 3.1% of families and 6.8% of the population were below the poverty line, including 9.0% of those under age 18 and 10.8% of those age 65 or over.
