= Pine Lake, Alberta =

Populated place in Alberta

Coordinates: 52°06′37″N 113°28′56″W

Pine Lake
- Unincorporated community
- Location in Alberta
- Province: Alberta
- County: Red Deer County
- Named for: Adjacent lake

Location of Pine Lake Alberta

Pine Lake is an unincorporated community in Red Deer County in the province of Alberta.

== Name ==
Pine Lake got its name from the adjacent lake, the lake used to be known as Ghost Pine Lake from a native legend.

== History ==
The Pine Lake post office opened in 1895. Telephone lines arrived in 1912. On July 14, 2000, it was hit by a deadly F3 rated tornado, which 12 people were killed, and more than 100 people have been injured.

== Attractions ==
Pine Lake is home to a number of campgrounds and cottages, including Salvation Army Pine Lake Camp Whispering Pines G&CC, Leisure Campground and Pelican Bay.
