= Pine Lake tornado =

2000 fatal weather event in Alberta, Canada

- The tornado seen at or near peak intensity in Pine Lake.

Meteorological history
- Formed: July 14, 2000 7:00 p.m. MDT

F3 tornado
- on the Fujita scale
- Highest winds: 200 mph (320 km/h)

Overall effects
- Fatalities: 12
- Injuries: 100+
- Damage: $13 million (2000 USD) ($22.4 million in 2025 dollars)
- Areas affected: Green Acres Campground, Alberta, Canada
- Part of the tornado outbreaks of 2000

The 2000 Pine Lake tornado was a deadly tornado that struck areas near Pine Lake in central Alberta, on Friday, July 14, 2000, destroying a campground and a trailer park. Twelve people were killed, making it the first deadly tornado in Canada since 1987, when an F4 tornado killed 27 people in Edmonton, Alberta and injured 300+.

== Summary ==
The F3 tornado, which struck the Green Acres Campground at Pine Lake in central Alberta, killed 12 people and critically injured more than 100 others. The tornado formed out of a severe thunderstorm which formed on the eastern slopes of the Canadian Rockies and moved rapidly eastward, encountering a narrow band of low-level moisture that caused it to develop into a supercell thunderstorm. It touched down about 5 km (3.1 mi) west of the campground and was on the ground for approximately 20 km (12 mi).

Damage occurred in a swath 800 to 1,500 metres (0.50 to 0.93 mi) wide. The heaviest damage occurred in a 500 metres (0.31 mi) central corridor. Damage assessment suggests that winds within the central corridor reached 300 kilometres per hour (190 mph). In addition, Weather Watchers reported hail as large as baseballs.

An average of 16 tornadoes occur in Alberta every year, and an average of 41 tornadoes occur each year in the Prairie Provinces. The highest death toll due to a single tornado in Alberta occurred on July 31, 1987, colloquially referred to as Black Friday. Canada ranks second in the world for tornado occurrences after the United States.

== Chronology ==
- 5:37 PM Mountain Daylight Time (MDT) – Environment Canada issues a severe thunderstorm watch for the Red Deer area, including Pine Lake.
- 6:18 PM MDT – watch upgraded to a severe thunderstorm warning, indicating that a thunderstorm with potentially large hail, very heavy rain, intense lightning and dangerous winds had developed.
- 7:00 PM MDT – the tornado destroys a number of recreational vehicles in the Green Acres Campground on the western shore of Pine Lake. 12 people are killed and more than 100 critically injured.
- 7:05 PM MDT – RCMP notify Environment Canada that a tornado had just been reported at Pine Lake. The severe thunderstorm warning was immediately upgraded to a tornado warning.
- After 7:05 PM MDT – Warnings and watches were continued through the evening hours. In all, more than 40 watches and warnings were issued for Alberta and Saskatchewan as the storm crossed the provincial boundary.

== See also ==
- Lists of tornadoes and tornado outbreaks
  - List of North American tornadoes and tornado outbreaks
  - List of Canadian tornadoes
