= Pine Lake Township, Pine County, Minnesota =

Pine Lake Township, Minnesota
- Township
- Location within the state of Minnesota Pine Lake Township, Minnesota (the United States)
- Coordinates: 46°12′10″N 92°59′35″W
- Country: United States
- State: Minnesota
- County: Pine

Area
  - Total: 35.1 sq mi (90.8 km^{2})
  - Land: 33.1 sq mi (85.7 km^{2})
  - Water: 2.0 sq mi (5.1 km^{2})
- Elevation: 1,106 ft (337 m)

Population (2000)
  - Total: 576
  - Density: 17/sq mi (6.7/km^{2})
- Time zone: UTC-6 (Central (CST))
  - Summer (DST): UTC-5 (CDT)
- ZIP code: 55735
- Area code: 320
- FIPS code: 27-51226
- GNIS feature ID: 0665308

Pine Lake Township is a township in Pine County, Minnesota, United States. The population was 576 at the 2000 census.

== Geography ==
According to the United States Census Bureau, the township has a total area of 35.1 square miles (90.8 km^{2}), of which 33.1 square miles (85.8 km^{2}) is land and 2.0 square miles (5.1 km^{2}) (5.59%) is water.

== Demographics ==
As of the census of 2000, there were 576 people, 238 households, and 170 families residing in the township. The population density was 17.4 people per square mile (6.7/km^{2}). There were 479 housing units at an average density of 14.5/sq mi (5.6/km^{2}). The racial makeup of the township was 97.92% White, 0.17% African American, 1.04% Native American, 0.69% Asian, and 0.17% from two or more races. Hispanic or Latino of any race were 0.69% of the population.

There were 238 households, out of which 28.2% had children under the age of 18 living with them, 63.4% were married couples living together, 5.5% had a female householder with no husband present, and 28.2% were non-families. 24.4% of all households were made up of individuals, and 10.9% had someone living alone who was 65 years of age or older. The average household size was 2.42 and the average family size was 2.81.

In the township the population was spread out, with 24.1% under the age of 18, 4.2% from 18 to 24, 25.2% from 25 to 44, 26.7% from 45 to 64, and 19.8% who were 65 years of age or older. The median age was 44 years. For every 100 females, there were 121.5 males. For every 100 females age 18 and over, there were 111.1 males.

The median income for a household in the township was $41,094, and the median income for a family was $46,375. Males had a median income of $39,167 versus $21,250 for females. The per capita income for the township was $16,903. About 9.3% of families and 12.4% of the population were below the poverty line, including 16.2% of those under age 18 and 5.5% of those age 65 or over.
