= Minsk Automobile Plant =

Belarusian state-owned automotive manufacturer

Coordinates: 53°51′44″N 27°39′15″E

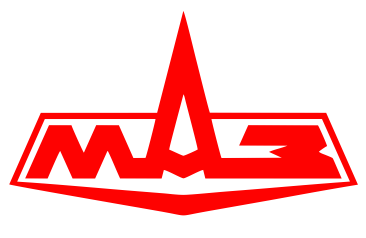

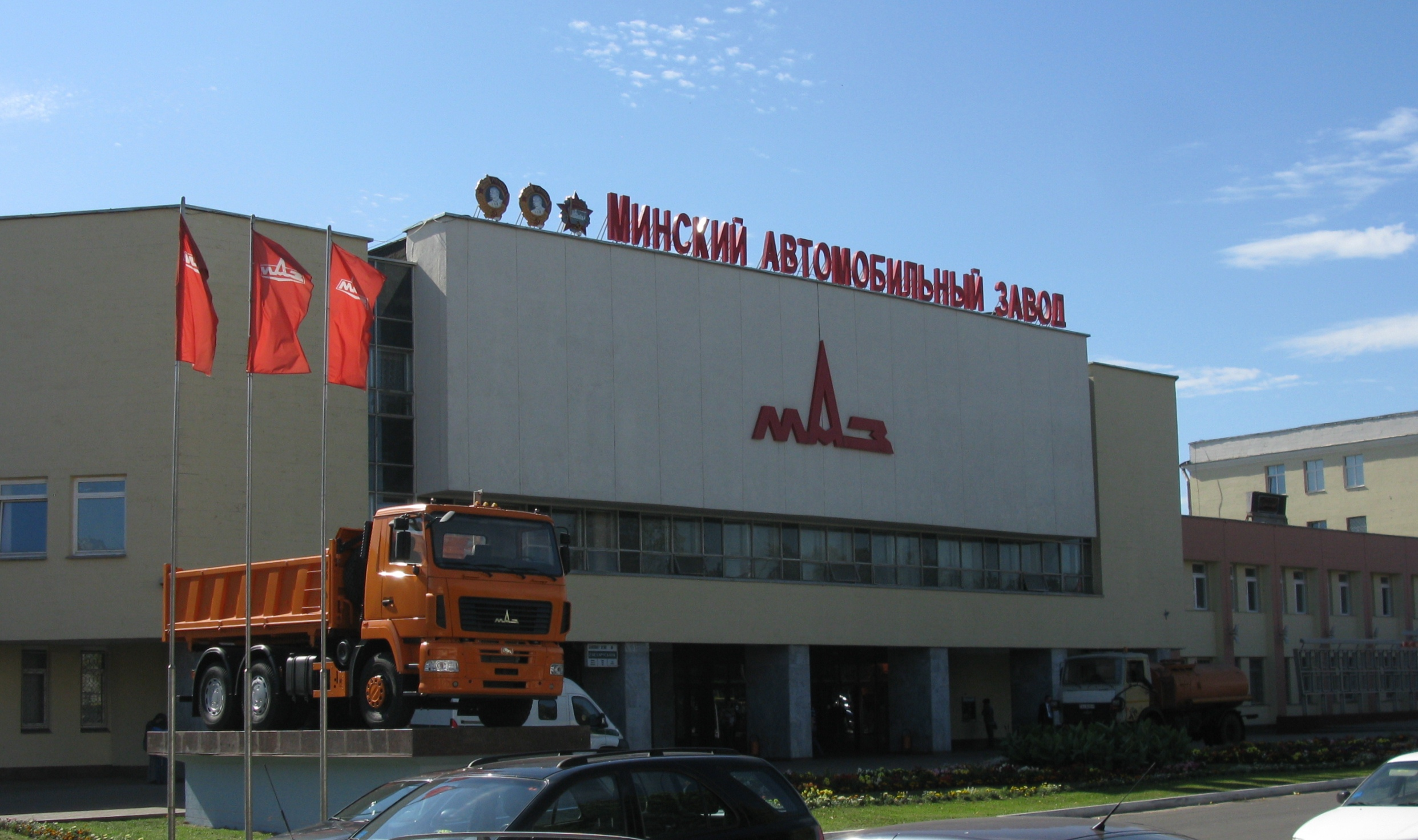
- MAZ headquarters
- Native name: Мінскі аўтамабільны завод
- Type: State-owned enterprise
- Industry: Automotive
- Founded: July 16, 1944
- Headquarters: Minsk, Belarus
- Area served: Russia; South Caucasus; Central Asia
- Key people: Valery Ivankovich (Director General)
- Products: Trucks, buses, trolleybuses
- Revenue: €477 million (2021)
- Net income: €0.1 million (2021)
- Owner: Government of Belarus
- Number of employees: 16,594 (2016)
- Website: maz.by/en

Minsk Automobile Plant (shortened MAZ) (Belarusian: Адкрытaе Акцыянэрнaе Таварыства «Мінскі аўтамабільны завод», romanized: Adkrytaje Akcyjanernaje Tavarystva "Minski aŭtamabiĺny zavod", Russian: Минский автомобильный завод, romanized: Minskiy Avtomobilnyy Zavod) is a state-run automotive manufacturer association in Belarus, one of the largest in Eastern Europe.

== History ==
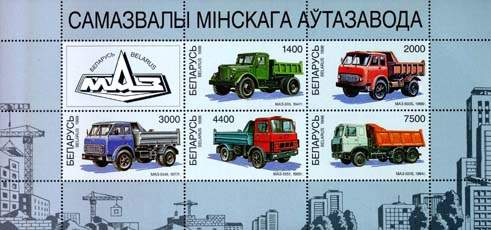
Stamps of Belarus with MAZ trucks (1998)

After a decision by the Soviet Industrial command in August 1944, the plant was begun as the Second World War ended. The first MAZ model, the MAZ-200, entered production in 1949. This truck used General Motors-designed two-stroke engines and was a continuation of a truck developed by the Yaroslavl Motor Plant (YaMZ), who also built the engines. Later on, YaMZ's own original engines were developed and implemented in the MAZ-500 series which was first shown in 1955, but only reaching full series production in 1965.

Apartment buildings, shops, medical clinics, cinemas etc. were built in close proximity to the MAZ plant, providing plant workers with local (though limited) necessities. On many of the construction sites, German prisoners of war were working together with Belarusian construction workers.

It manufactures heavy-duty trucks, buses, trolleybuses, road tractors and semi-trailers for semi-trailer trucks, and cranes. MAZ was, and possibly is, the world's largest manufacturer of TELs (Transporter-Erector-Launchers) for many of the world's mobile ballistic missiles, from the MAZ-543 used to carry and launch the Scud B through to the Topol M's 8-axle TEL.

In 2020, it was said that the MAZ was the primary supplier for the chassis of such Russian army vehicles as the launchers for the Iskander-M and the S-400 because the domestic Russian products are of comparatively low quality.

== Political repressions, sanctions ==
On 21 June 2021, MAZ (as well as its general manager Ivankovich) was added to the sanctions list of the European Union for repressions against workers who participated in mass protests against the authoritarian regime of Alexander Lukashenko following the controversial presidential election of 2020. According to the official decision of the EU,

"[MAZ] is a source of revenue for the Lukashenka regime. OJSC MAZ has offered its premises and equipment to stage a political rally in support of the regime. Therefore, OJSC “MAZ” benefits from and supports the Lukashenka regime."

Moreover,

Employees of OJSC “MAZ” who took part in strikes and peaceful protests in the aftermath of fraudulent August 2020 elections in Belarus, were intimidated and later laid off by the company’s managements. A group of employees was locked indoors by OJSC MAZ to prevent them from joining the other protesters. Therefore, MAZ is responsible for the repression of civil society and supports the Lukashenka regime.

On the same day, MAZ and Ivankovich were also sanctioned by Canada. Later, Switzerland also sanctioned the company and its general manager.

In March 2023, the U.S. Treasury included MAZ and Ivankovich in the Specially Designated Nationals and Blocked Persons (SDN) List. In May 2023, Ukraine imposed sanctions against the plant, followed by the U.S. sanctions on exports in 2024.

== Organization ==
The association consists of the MAZ plant proper, located in Minsk, which is the main enterprise of the association, as well as several secondary enterprises:

- РУП «БААЗ» (in Baranavichy)
- РУП «ОЗАА» (in Asipovichy)
- РУА «КЗТШ» (in Zhodino)
- РУП «Літмаш» (in Minsk),
- ПРУП «ДЭМЗ» (in Dzyarzhynsk)
- РУП «СтройМАЗтрест» (in Minsk)

At some points of its history, MAZ was "united" with another heavy automobile company - BELAZ also located in Minsk area.

In 1991, a division specialising in heavy wheeled military vehicles was spun off into a separate business, MZKT.

MAZ is 100% state-owned company.

== Products ==
Among other products, MAZ city buses (see pictures below) are operating throughout Belarus, as well as in Russia, Ukraine, Poland, Bosnia and Herzegovina, Romania, Serbia, Latvia and Estonia.

In Serbia, working in cooperation with a local-based company BIK (Bus industries Kragujevac), a production of gas-powered buses named BIK-203 has been agreed, which are based on the platform of MAZ-203 model.

== MAZ-MAN ==
In 1997, together with MAN, a joint Belarusian-German company JSC MAZ-MAN, was set up, which by 1998 had established full-scale production of heavy vehicles, using the F90 MAN cabs introduced 1986 and replaced in 1994. While production of tractors for international trade with 4x2 and 6x4 chassis layouts was a stated goal, development of exhaust gas regulations within the EU turned this into an illusion.

== Models ==
=== Cars ===
- MAZ-1500 (1959, MAZ's only car)

=== Trucks ===
- MAZ-200 (1950, formerly built by YaAZ from 1947 to 1950)
- МАZ-200V (1952, tractor-trailer version of MAZ-200)
- МАZ-205 (1950, dump truck version of MAZ-200)
- МАZ-500/MAZ-500A (1965)
- MAZ-501 (1955, logging truck version of MAZ-200)
- МАZ-501V (tractor-trailer version of MAZ-501)
- МАZ-502 (1957, 4x4 version of MAZ-200)
- МАZ-502V (tractor-trailer version of MAZ-502)
- МАZ-503/MAZ-503A (1958, dump truck version of MAZ-500)
- MAZ-504/MAZ-504A (1965, tractor-trailer version of MAZ-500)
- МАZ-505 (1962, prototype 4x4 truck based on MAZ-500)
- MAZ-506 (1954, prototype dump truck based on MAZ-205)
- МАZ-509 (1969, logging truck version of MAZ-500)
- MAZ-510 (1965, prototype dump truck based on MAZ-503)
- МАZ-511 (dump truck version of MAZ-500)
- MAZ-512/MAZ-500C (cold weather version of MAZ-500)
- MAZ-513/MAZ-500YU (hot weather version of MAZ-500)
- MAZ-514 (1965, prototype three-axle truck based on MAZ-500)
- МАZ-515 (1965, prototype tractor-trailer version of MAZ-514)
- МАZ-516 (1969)
- MAZ-520 (1972, prototype truck based on MAZ-504)
- MAZ-525 (1951, later built by BelAZ)
- MAZ-528 (1955, prototype wheeled dozer)
- MAZ-529 (1955, production moved to MoAZ in 1958)
- MAZ-530 (1957, later built by BelAZ)
- MAZ-532 (1957, prototype logging truck)
- MAZ-535 (1958; production moved to KZKT in 1961)
- MAZ-537 (1959; production moved to KZKT in 1963)
- MAZ-538 (1964, wheeled dozer)
- MAZ-541 (1956, aircraft tug based on MAZ-525)
- МАZ-543/МАZ-7310 (1962)
- MAZ-547/MAZ-7916 (1972)
- MAZ-2000 (1988, prototype truck)
- MAZ-3650 (2019)
- МАZ-4370 (1999)
- МАZ-4371 (2003)
- МАZ-4380 (2010)
- МАZ-4471 (2006)
- МАZ-4570 (2002)

- МАZ-5309 (2008)
- MAZ-5316 (1999, two-axle version of MAZ-6317)
- MAZ-5334 (1977, cab-chassis version of MAZ-5335)
- MAZ-5335 (1977)
- МАZ-5336 (1978)
- МАZ-5337 (1978)
- МАZ-5340 (2002)
- MAZ-5428 (1977)
- MAZ-5429 (1978)
- MAZ-5430 (1977)
- МАZ-5432 (1981)
- МАZ-5433 (1987)
- МАZ-5434 (1990)
- МАZ-5440 (1997)
- МАZ-5442
- МАZ-5516 (1988)
- MAZ-5549 (1978)
- MAZ-5550 (2006)
- МАZ-5551 (1985)
- МАZ-6303 (1990s)
- МАZ-6310 (2007)
- МАZ-6312 (2007)
- МАZ-6317 (1991)
- МАZ-6417
- MAZ-6418
- МАZ-6422 (1978)
- МАZ-6425 (tractor-trailer version of MAZ-6317)
- МАZ-6430 (1997)
- MAZ-6440 (2011, prototype)
- МАZ-6501 (2008)
- MAZ-6502 (2015)
- МАZ-6516
- МАZ-6517 (1994)
- МАZ-7410 (based on MAZ-543)
- МАZ-7906 (1984, prototype)
- MAZ-7907 (1985)
- МАZ-7910 (based on MAZ-543)
- MAZ-7922 (1990, prototype)
- MAZ-79221 (1996, later built by MZKT)

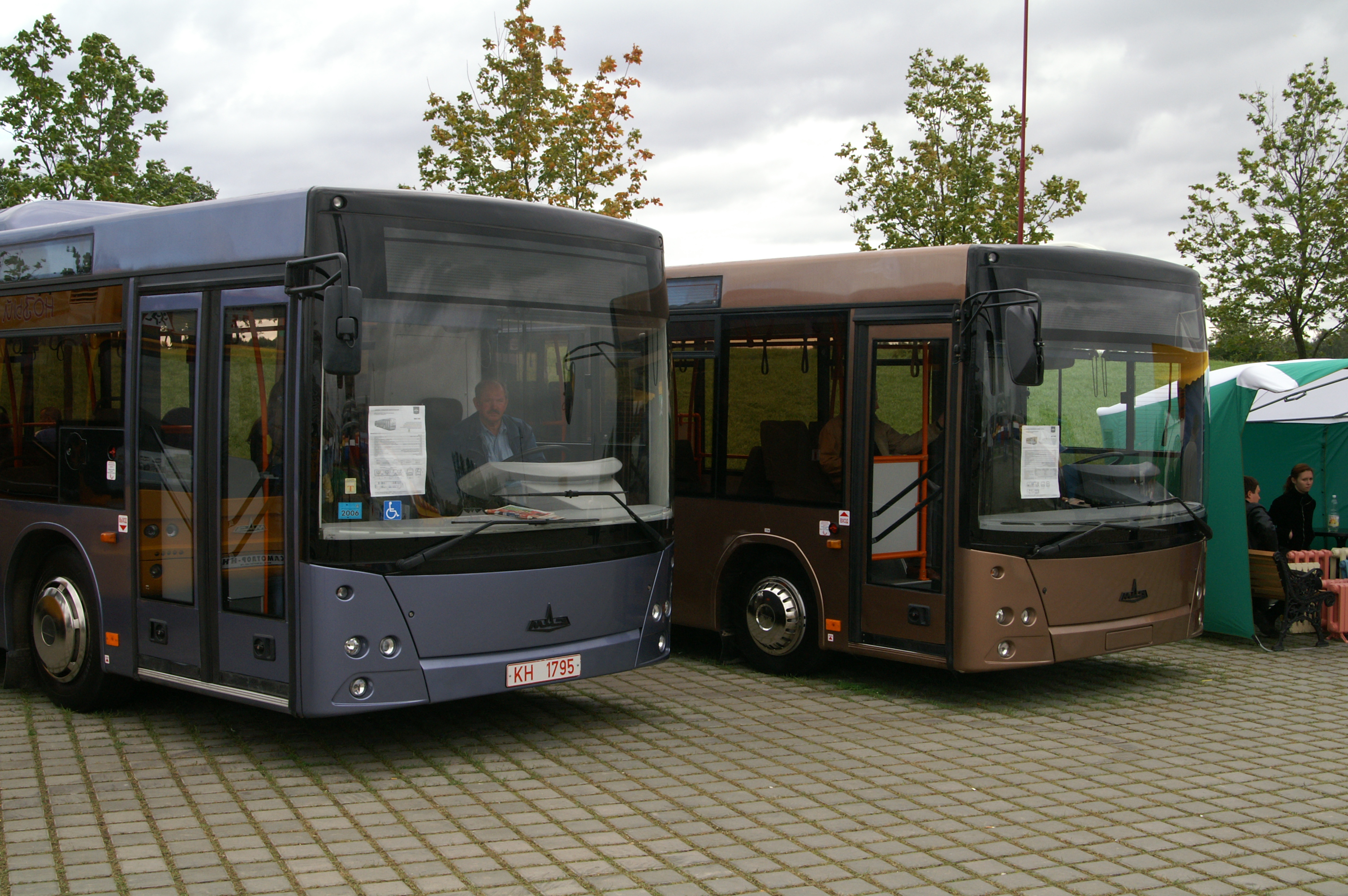
MAZ-203 and MAZ-206 buses

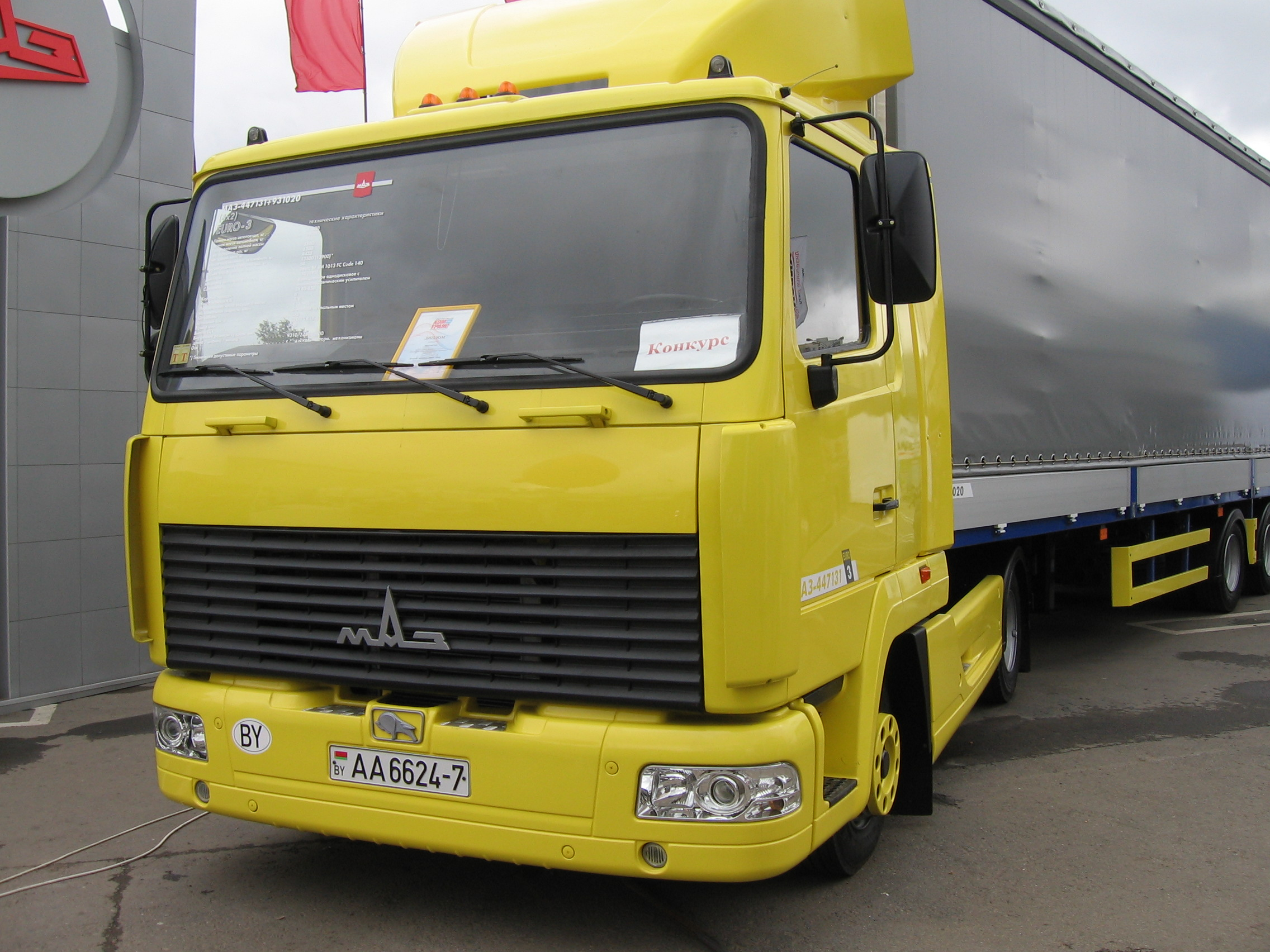
MAZ-447131

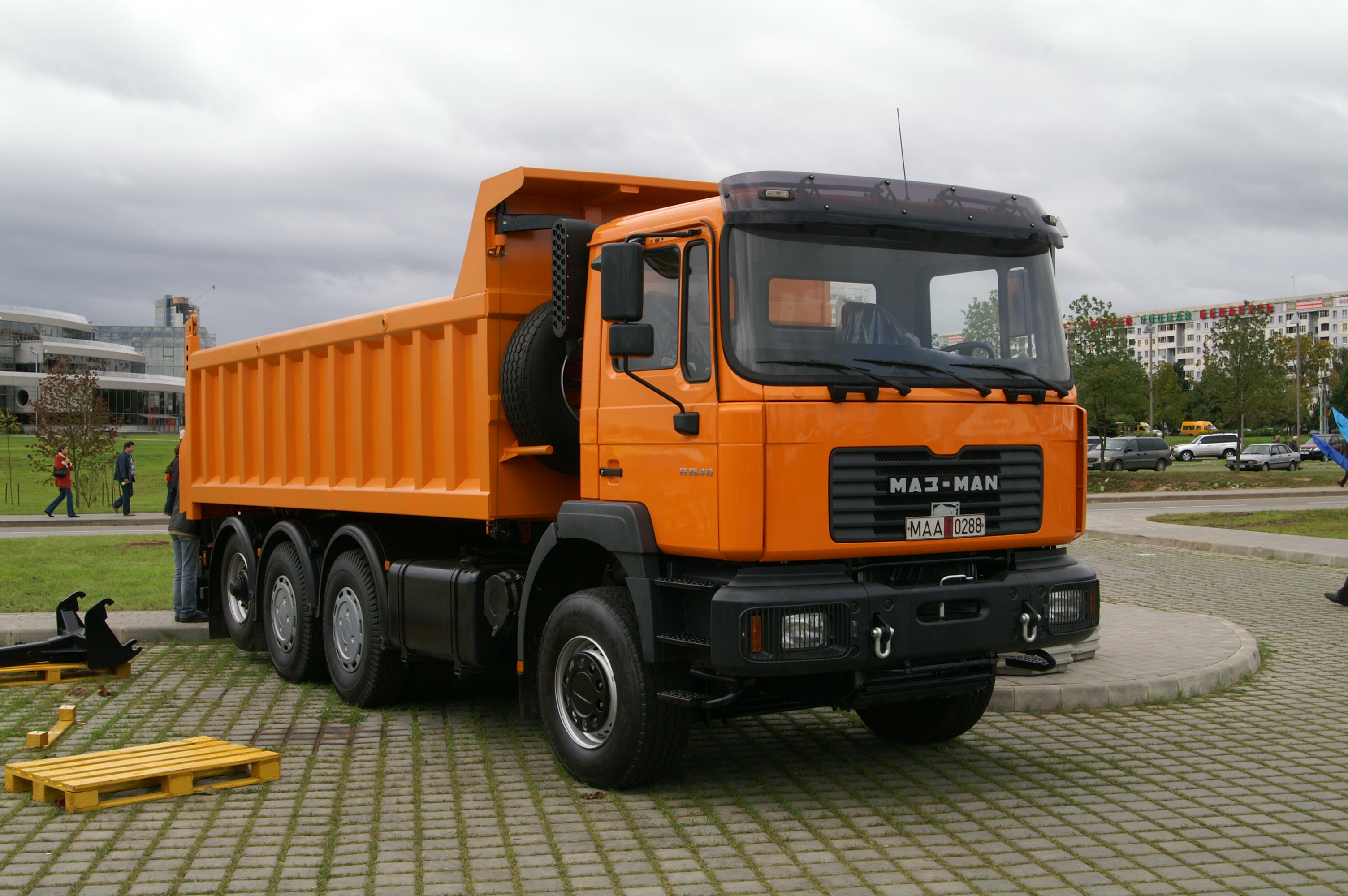
Tipper, with the MAN F90 cab

=== Buses ===
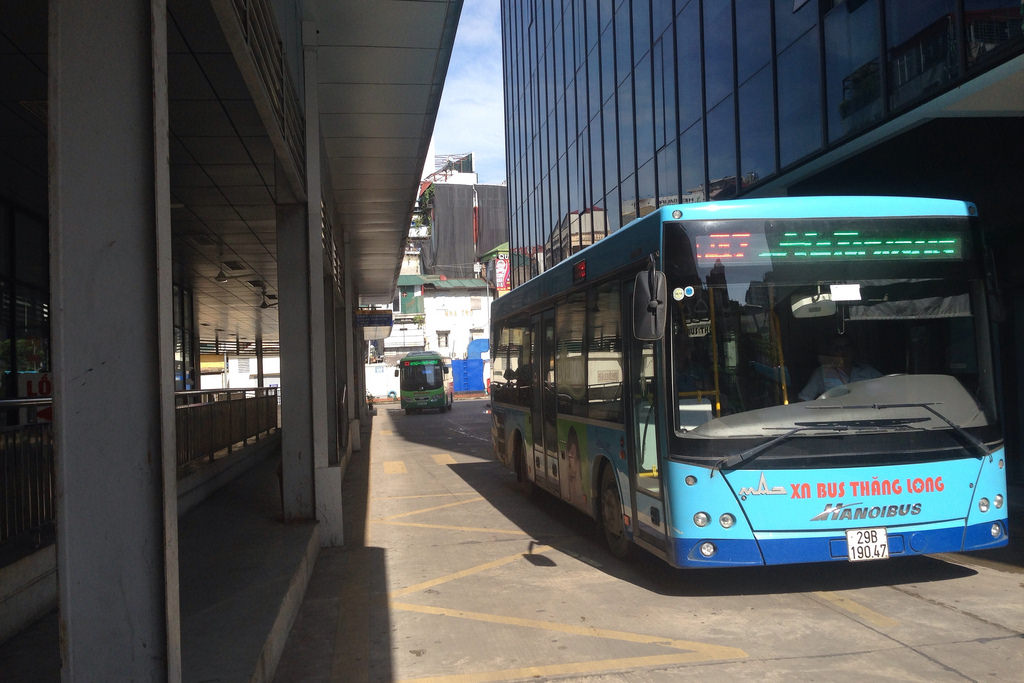
A MAZ 206 approaching Kim Mã Termini, Hanoi, Vietnam

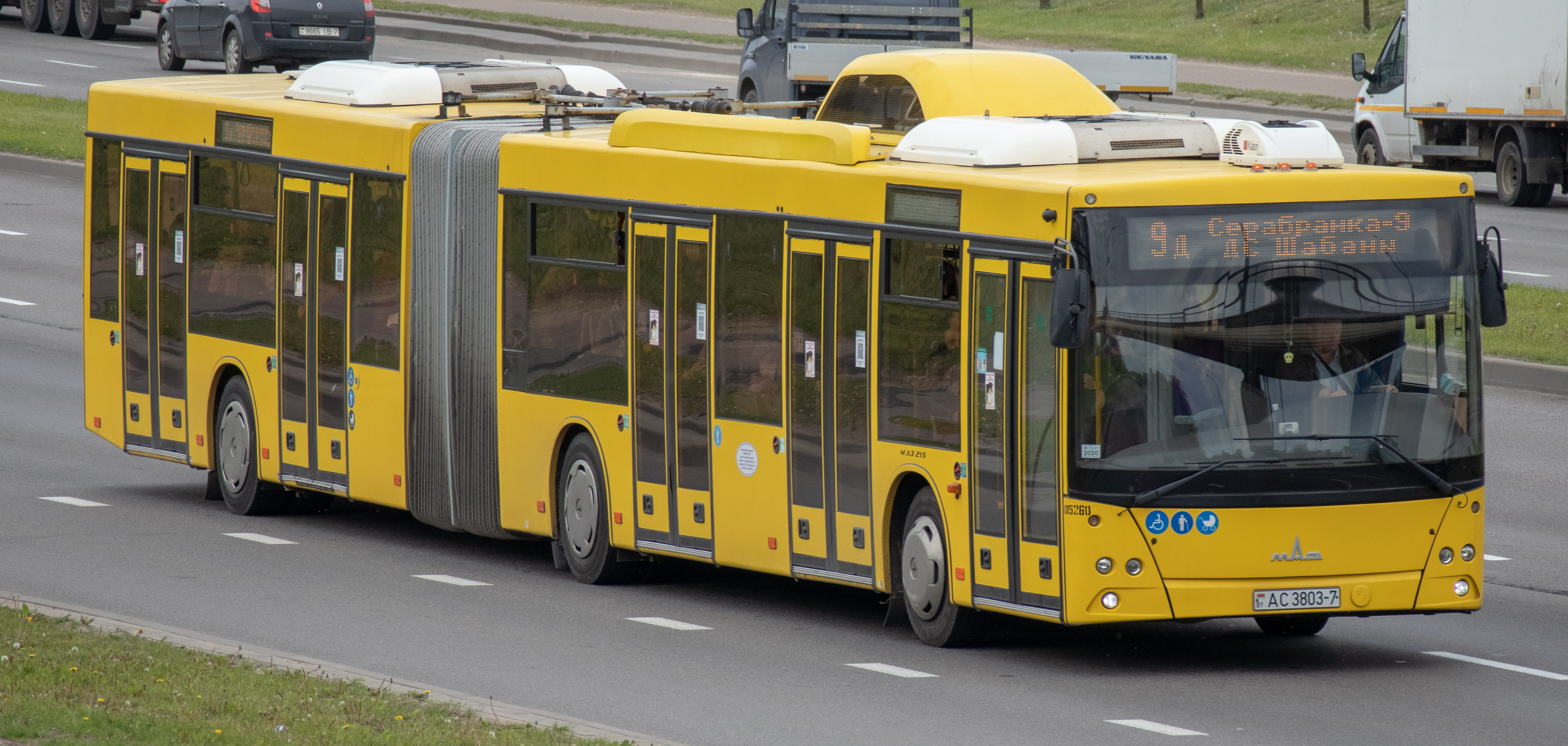
MAZ-215 in Minsk

- MAZ-101 (1993, based on Neoplan N4016)
- MAZ-103 Omnibus (1996, based on MAZ-101)
- MAZ-103T Trolleybus (1999)
- MAZ-104 (1997, based on MAZ-103)
- MAZ-105 articulated (1997, based on MAZ-103)
- MAZ-107 three axle (2001, based on MAZ-103)
- MAZ-152 city bus (1999)
- MAZ-163
- MAZ-171 Airport bus (2005)
- MAZ-203 Omnibus (2006)
- MAZ-203T Trolleybus (2006)
- MAZ-205 (2009)
- MAZ-206 Omnibus (2006)
- MAZ-207
- MAZ-215 (2014)
- MAZ-216 (2018)
- MAZ-226 (2007)
- MAZ-231
- MAZ-241
- MAZ-251 Tourist (2006)
- MAZ-256 Omnibus (2006)
- MAZ-257 (2019)
- MAZ-271 (2020)
- MAZ-281 (2019)
- MAZ-303 (2019)

=== Special models ===
- MAZ-535/MAZ-537 - The MAZ-535 and the heavier version MAZ-537 were developed in the early 1960s and built to transport rockets and tanks of various types.
- MAZ-543/MAZ-7310 - The MAZ-543 was also designed for the transport of medium-and long-range missiles and has the same specifications as the MAZ-537. The MAZ-543 is best known as mobile missile launch pad of Scud missiles. In 1976, the MAZ-7310 was released. It is similar to the MAZ-543 but without the special equipment. In addition, there are various modifications of the vehicle, such as the MAZ-547 as a mobile launch pad for SS-20 missiles or the MAZ-7917 as a launch pad of Topol intercontinental missile.
- MAZ-547/MAZ-7916 - The MAZ-547 is a six-axle version of the MAZ-543 and was used for the RSD-10 Pioneer IRBM. The MAZ-7916, an improved version, was released in 1980.
- MAZ-7904 - The MAZ-7904 is the largest wheeled vehicle that was ever designed for military purposes in the USSR. The prototype was designed in 1982 as a support vehicle for intercontinental ballistic missiles, but never went into production. The vehicle was found in 2007 in a hangar at Baikonur, but was scrapped in 2010 due to severe corrosion.
- MAZ-7906/MAZ-7907 - The MAZ-7906 was an eight-axle, 16 wheel Transporter-erector-launcher intended to transport the Tselina-2 missile, a projected road-mobile variant of the RT-23 Molodets. In 1985, the 12-axle MAZ-7907 was developed, also intended for the Tselina-2. Two prototypes were produced, but despite successful factory trials, no production followed. At least one seems to have been used after the collapse of the USSR for transportation of bridge parts and ships. One unit is stored at the Minsk Wheel Tractor plant awaiting restoration.
- МАZ-7912/MAZ-7917 - The MAZ-7912 is a seven-axle, 14 wheel TEL for the Topol missile. In 1984, the MAZ-7917 was released, lengthened 1 m (3.3 ft) and had crew cabins similar to the MAZ-7916.
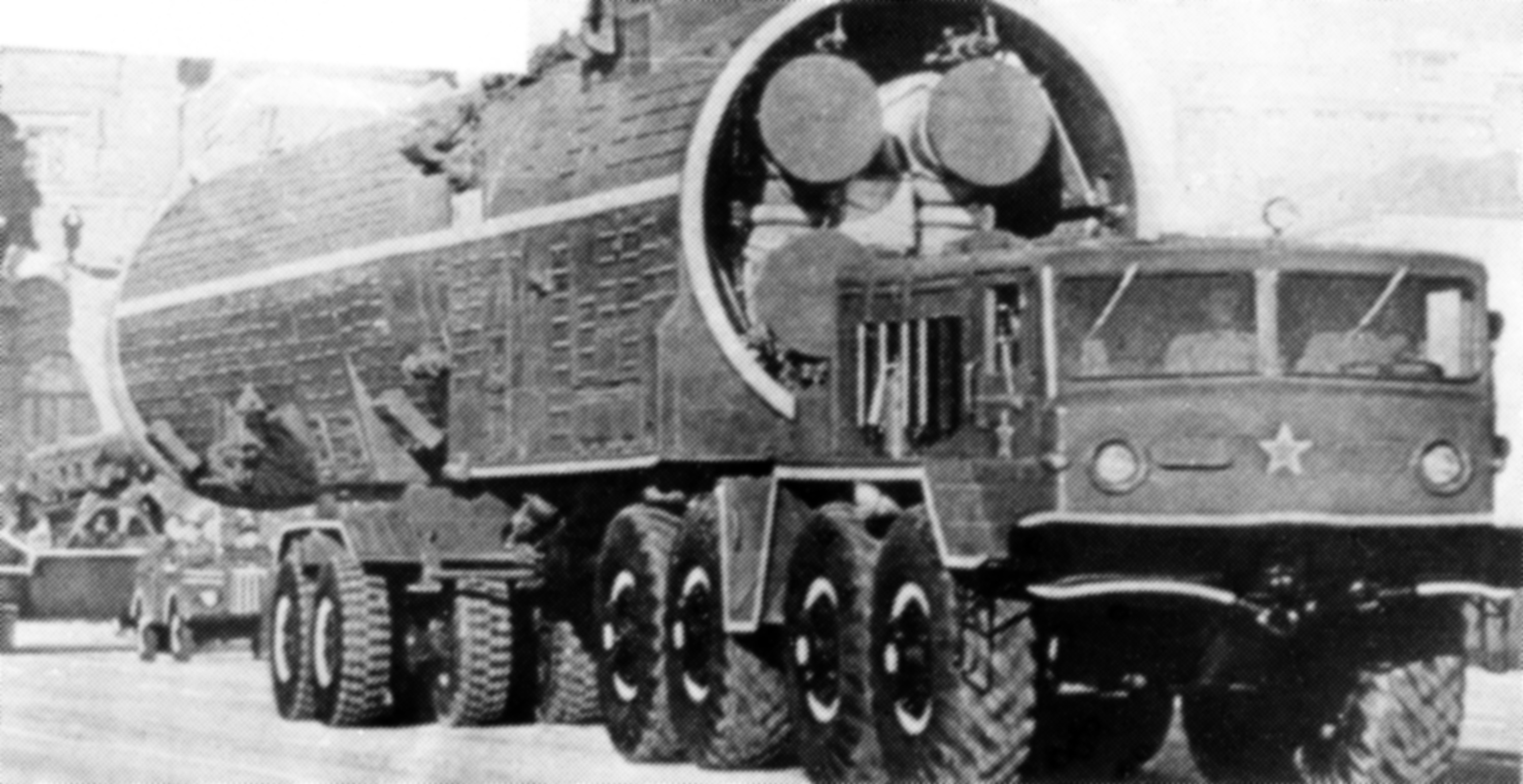
MAZ-537

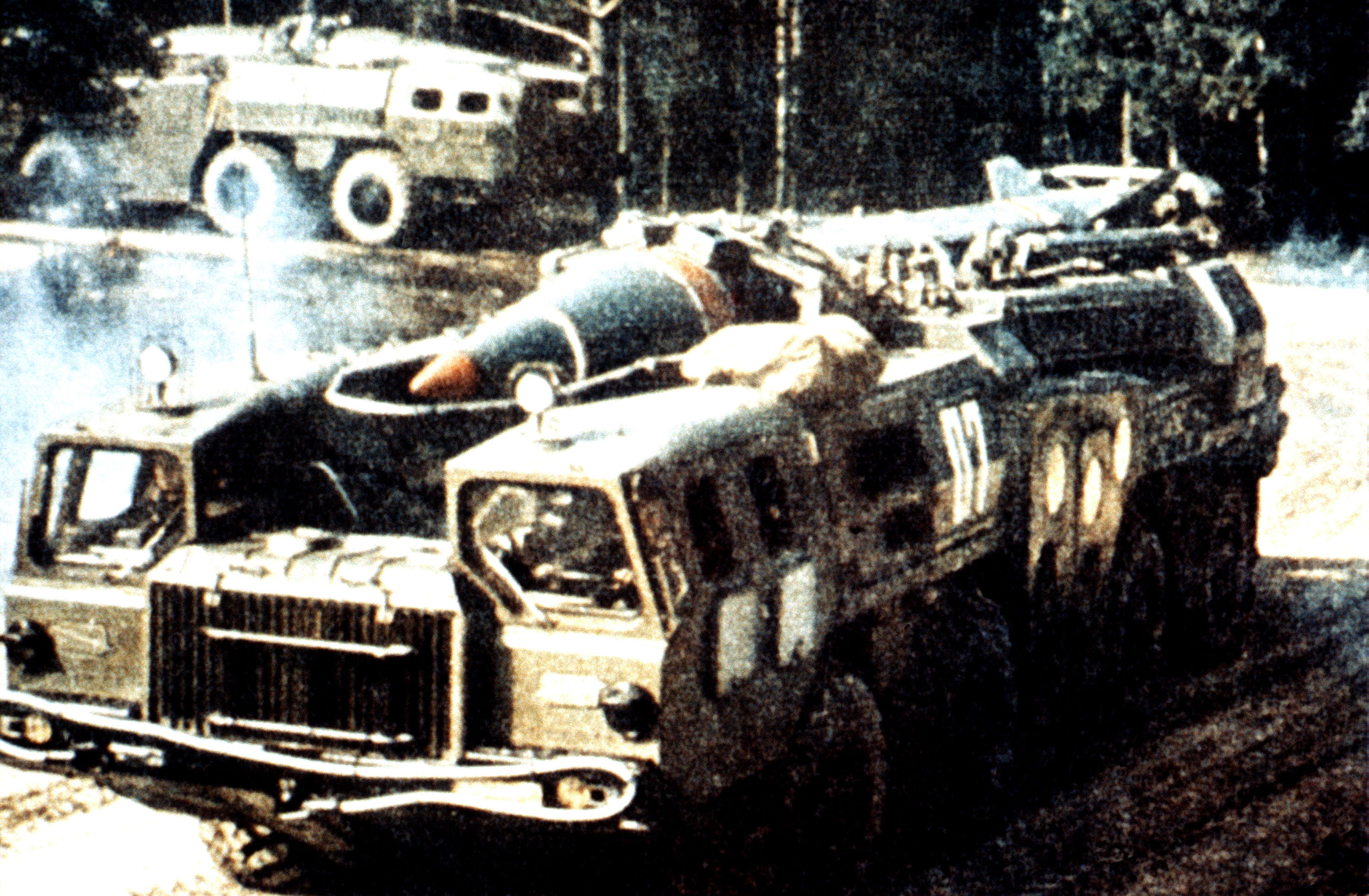
MAZ-543

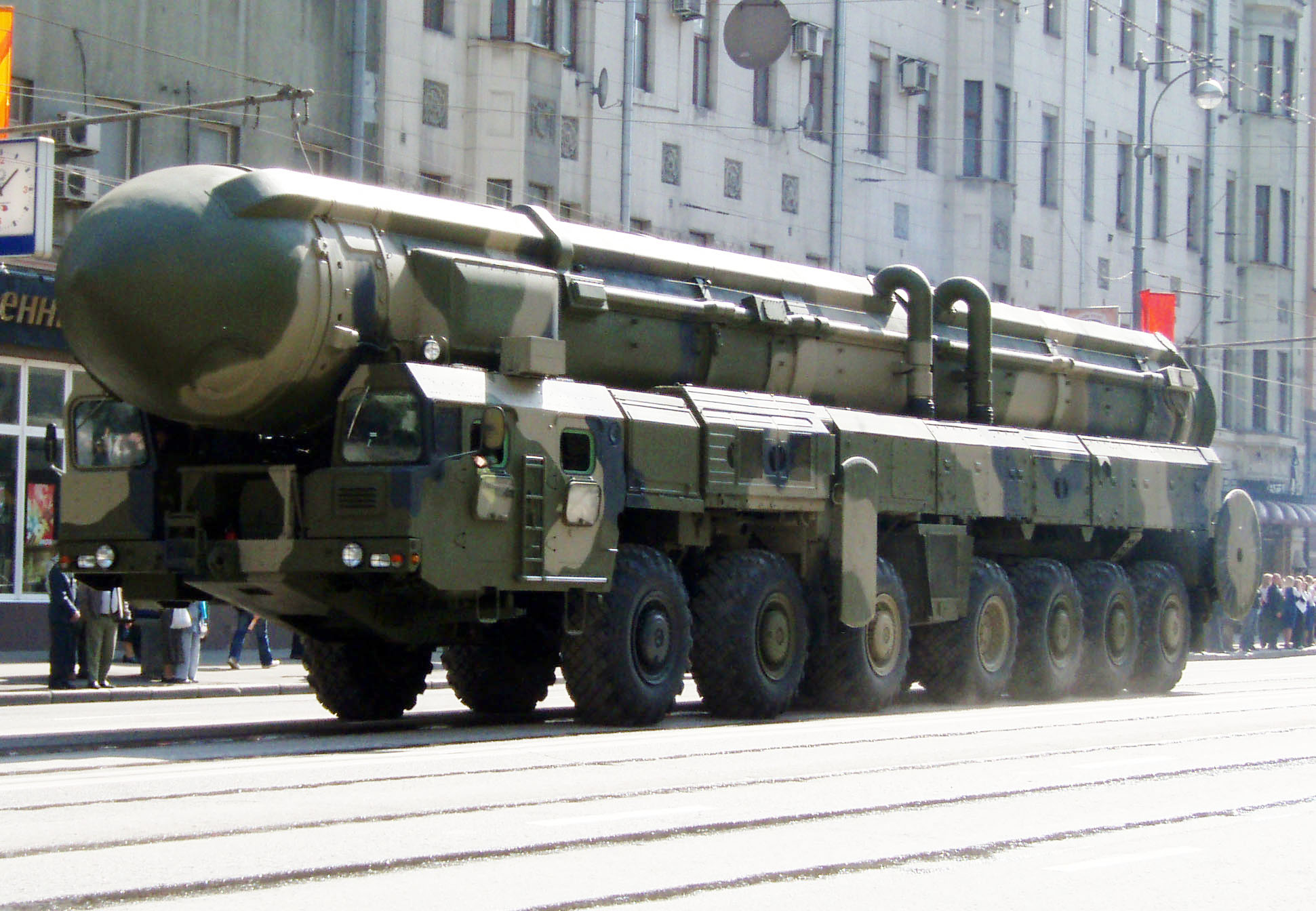
MAZ-7917

== Generations ==
No	Years of release	Features	Image
1	1950—1965	MAZ-200-series	
2	1965—1977	MAZ-500-series	
3	1977—1990	MAZ-5334/35-series	
4	since 1981	MAZ-6422/5432-series	
5	since 1997	MAZ-6430/5440-series	

== Sponsorship in football ==
- 1999–2002: Torpedo-MAZ Minsk

== Gallery ==
=== Buses ===
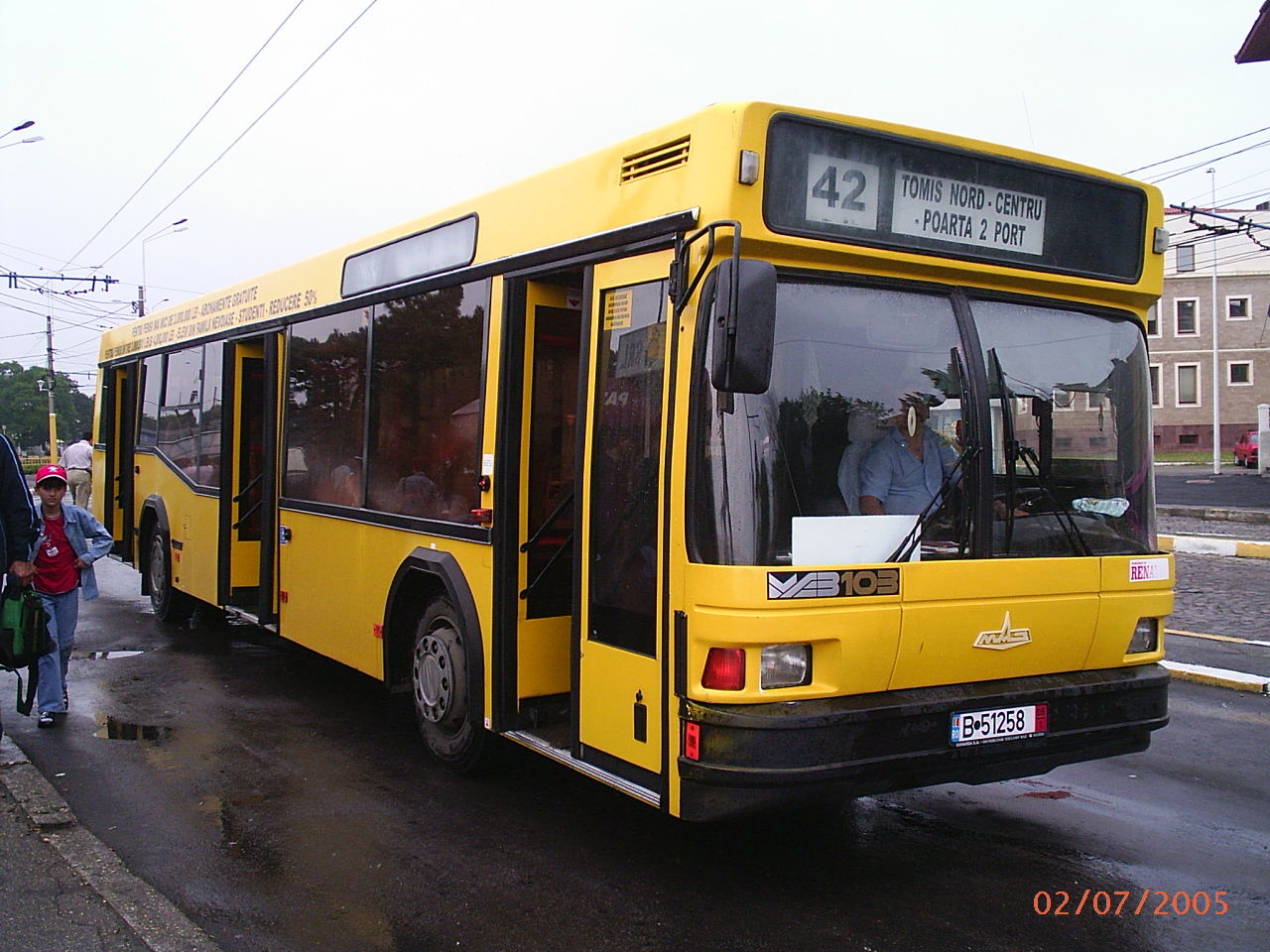
MAZ-103 city bus (yellow) in Constanța, Romania

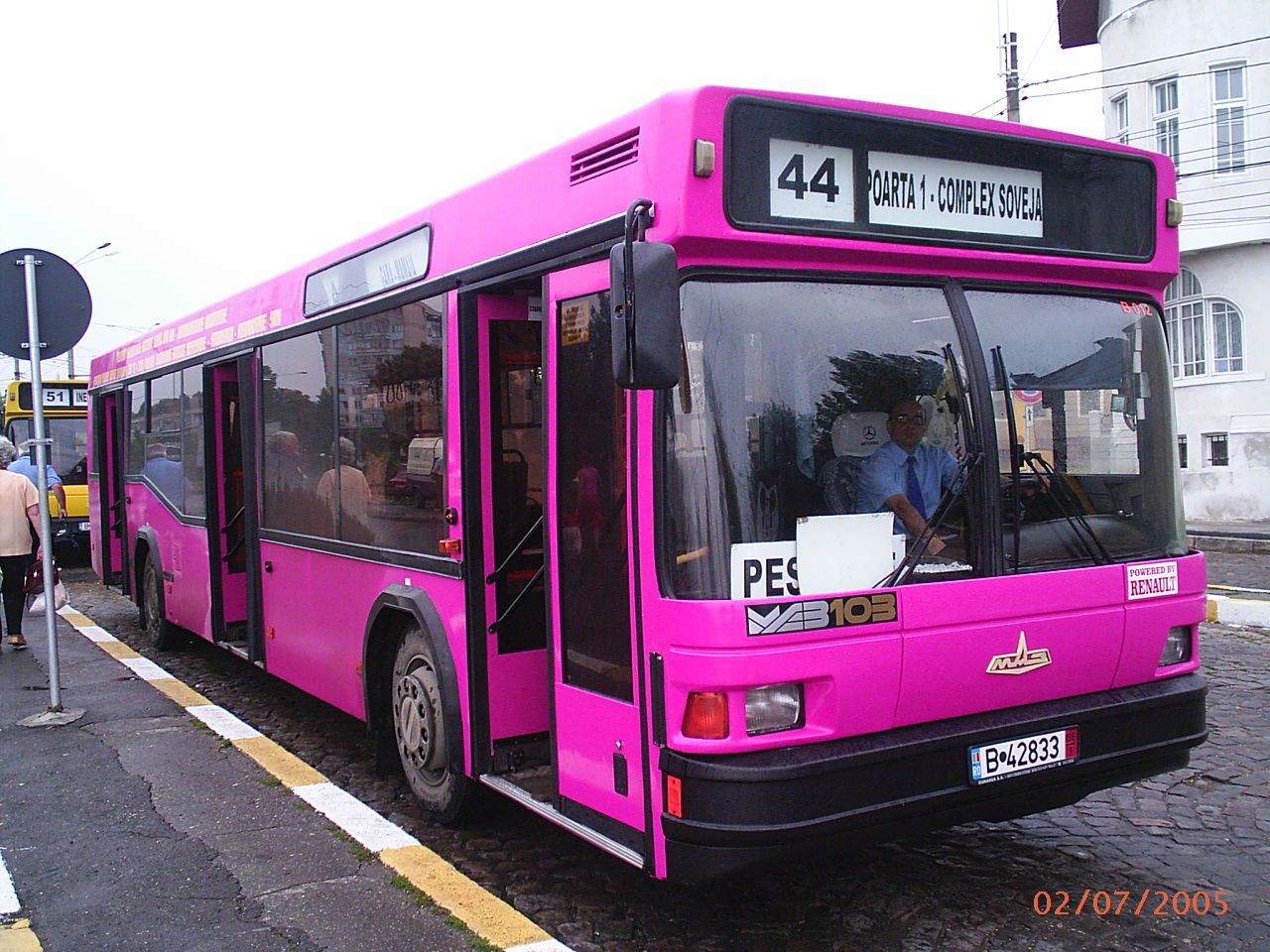
MAZ-103 city bus (pink) in Constanța, Romania

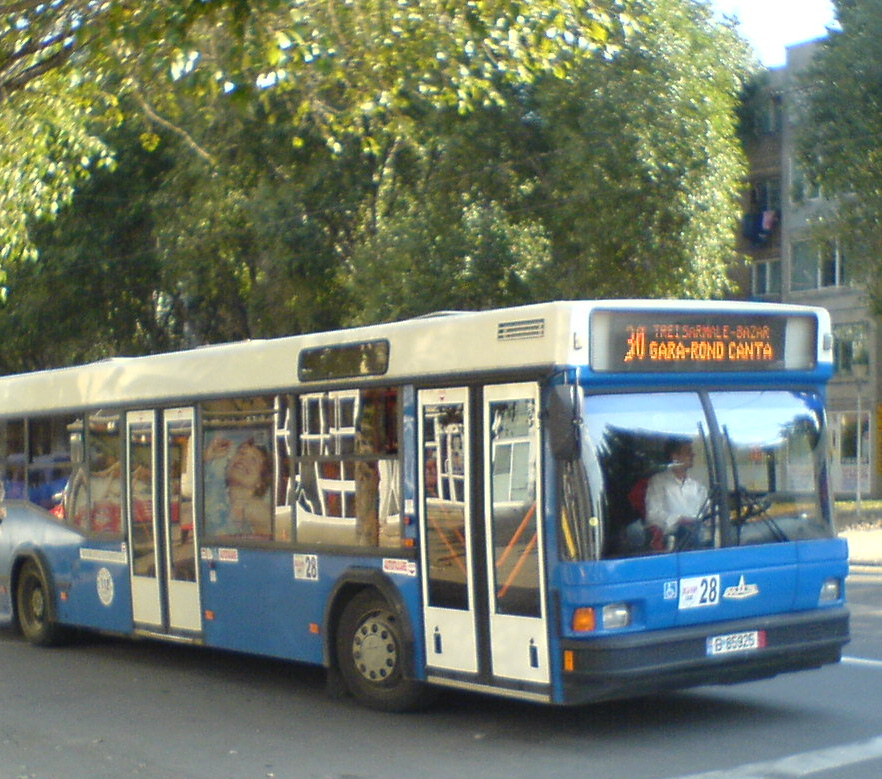
MAZ-103 city bus in Iași, Romania

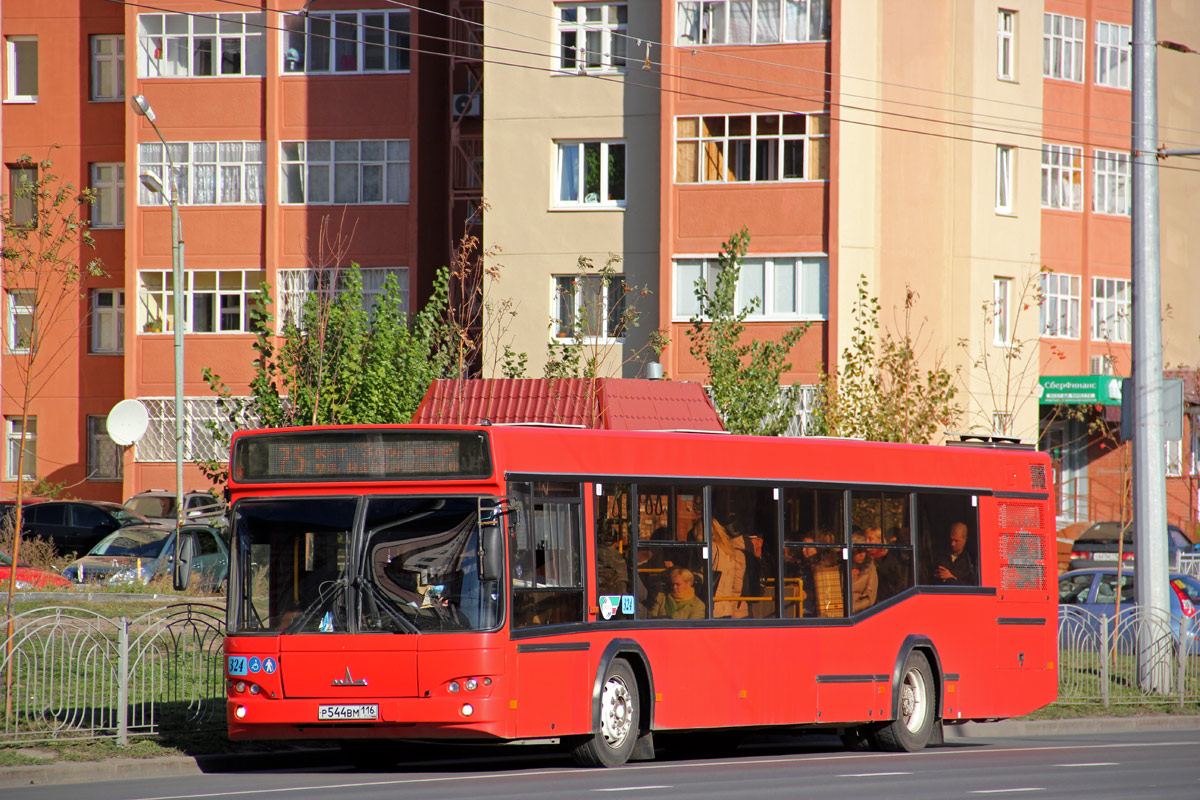
Restyled MAZ-103 bus in Kazan, Russia

Restyled MAZ-103 in Mariupol

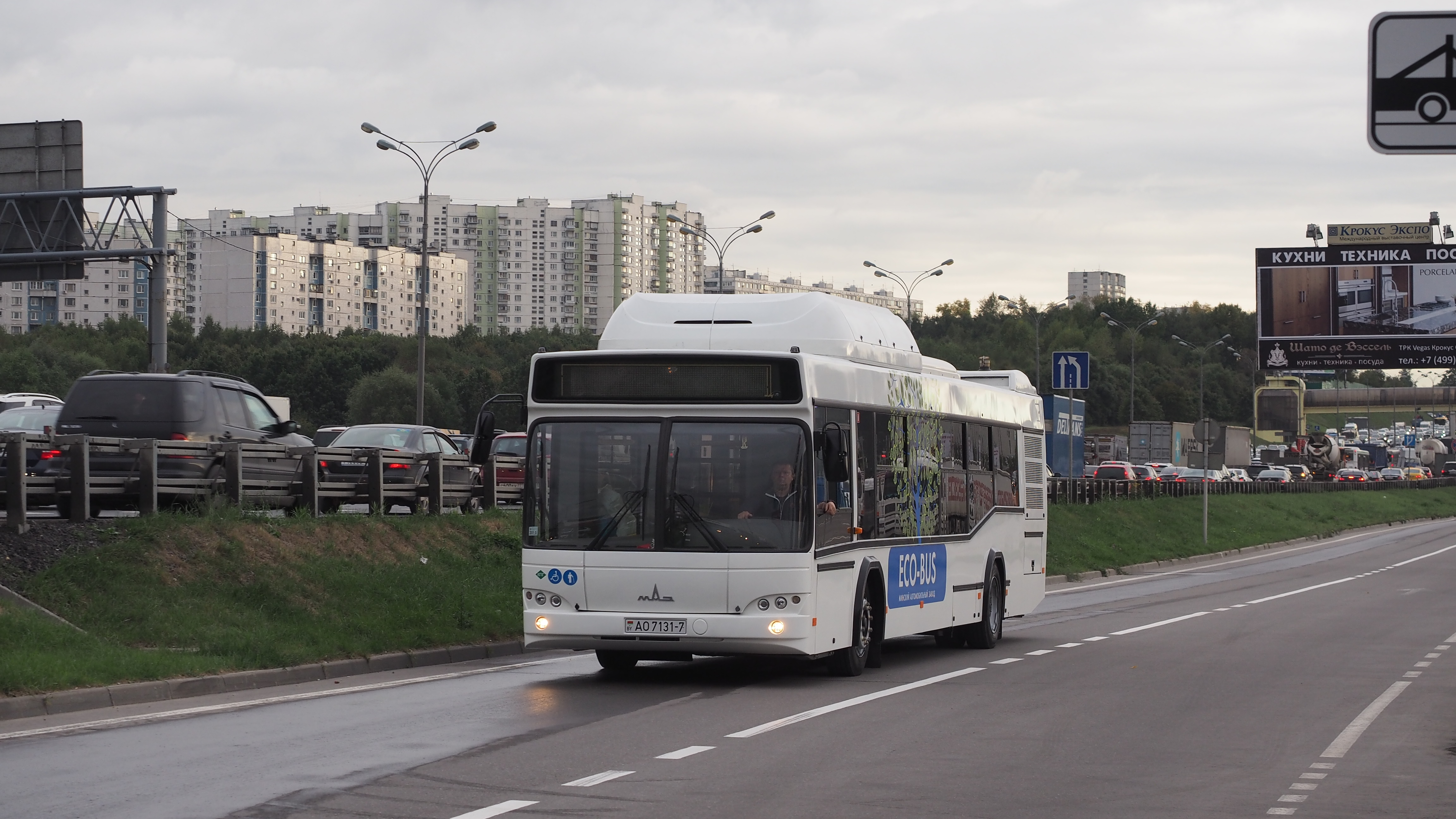
MAZ-103 CNG

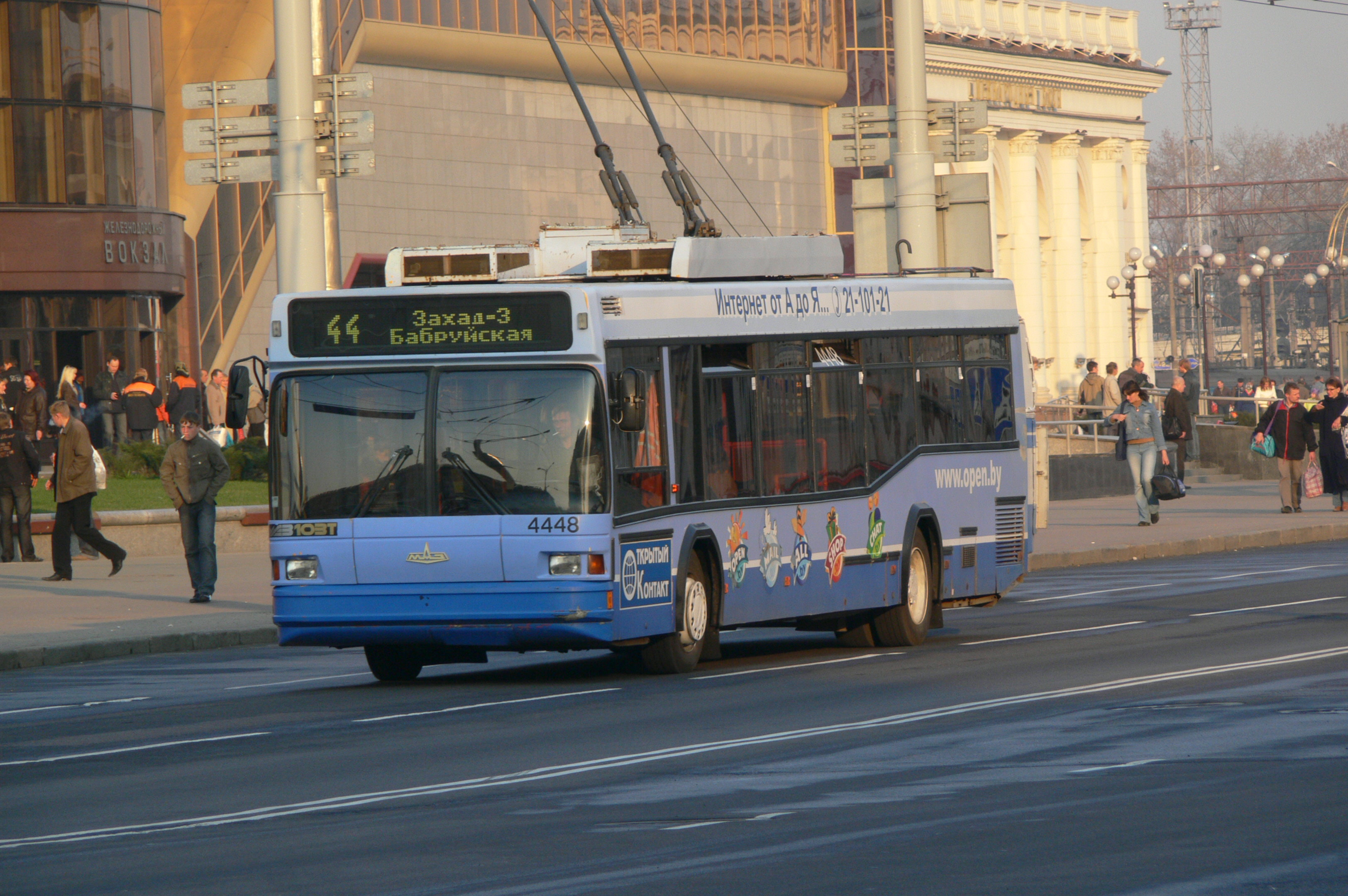
MAZ-103T trolleybus in Minsk

MAZ-105 articulated bus in Minsk

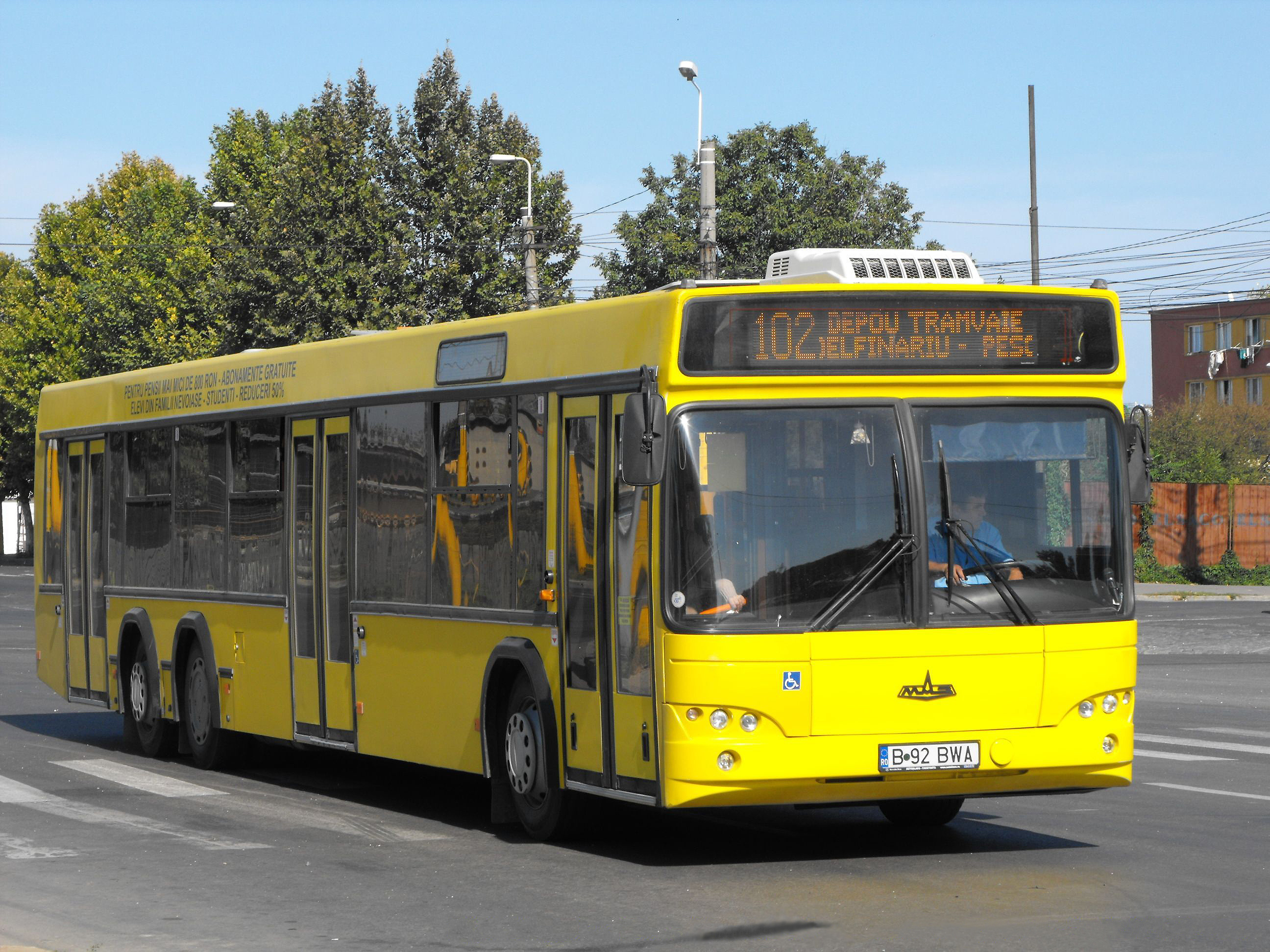
MAZ-107 city bus in Constanța, Romania

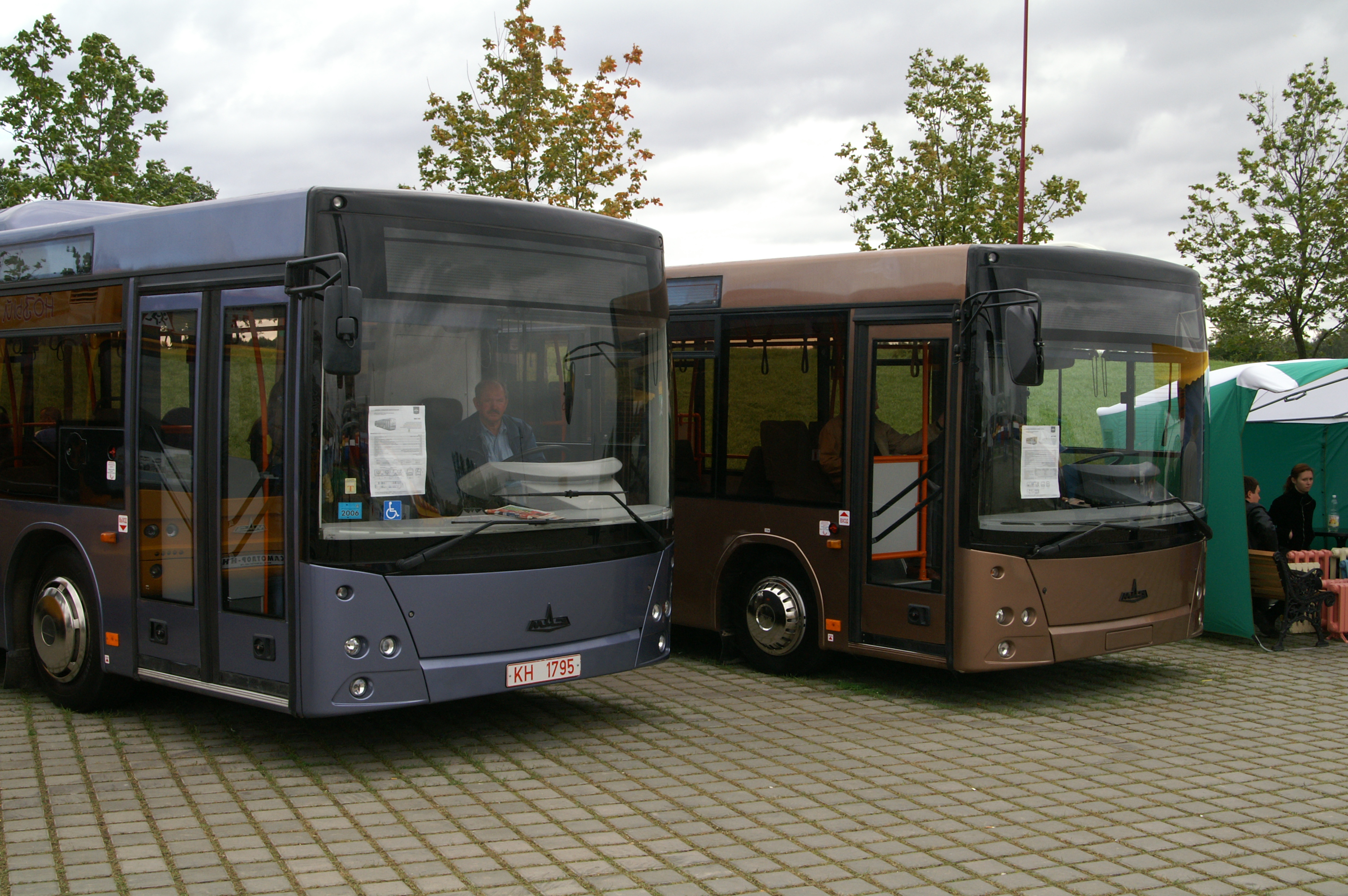
MAZ-203 and MAZ-206 buses

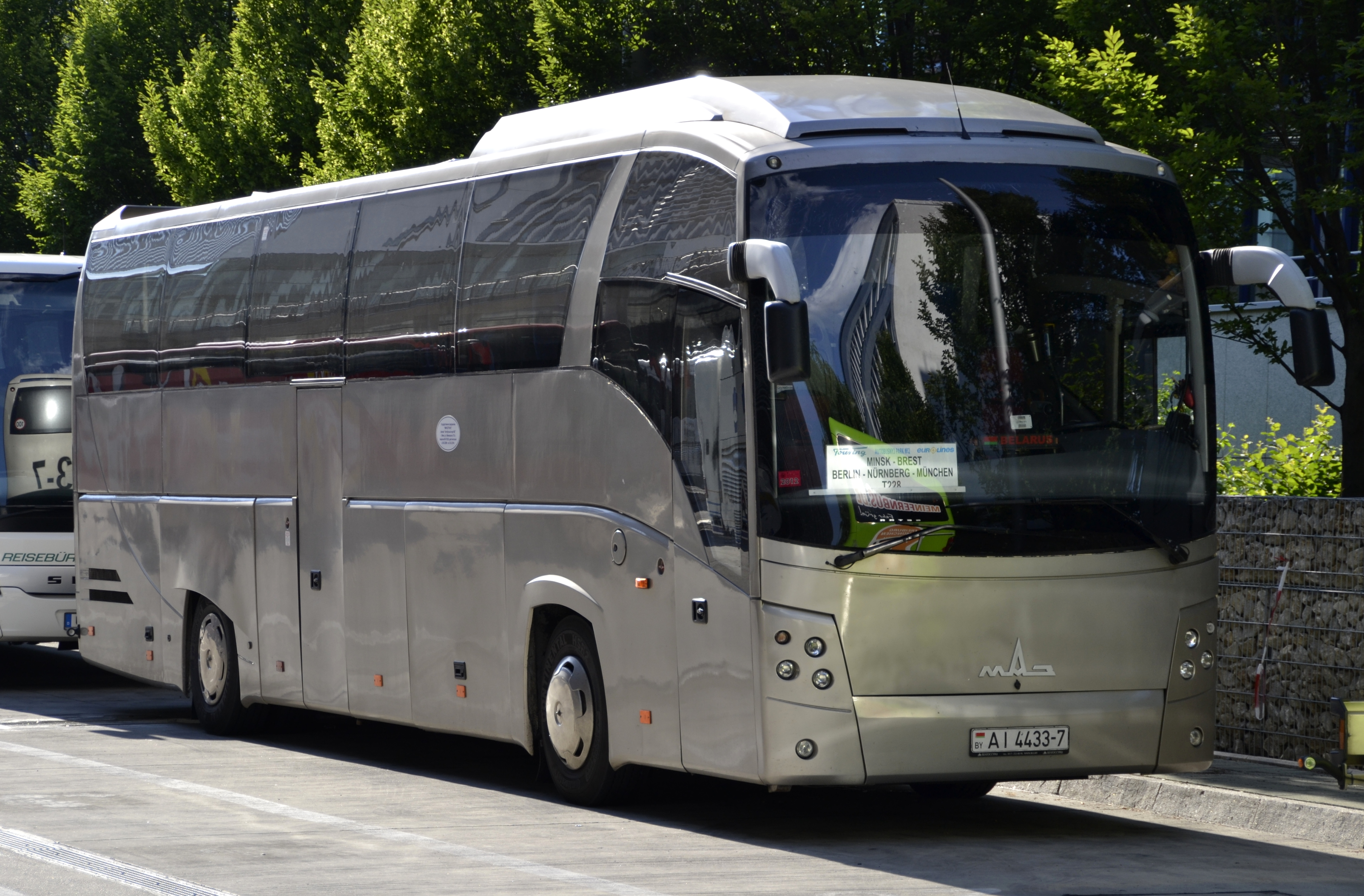
MAZ-251 coach in Munich

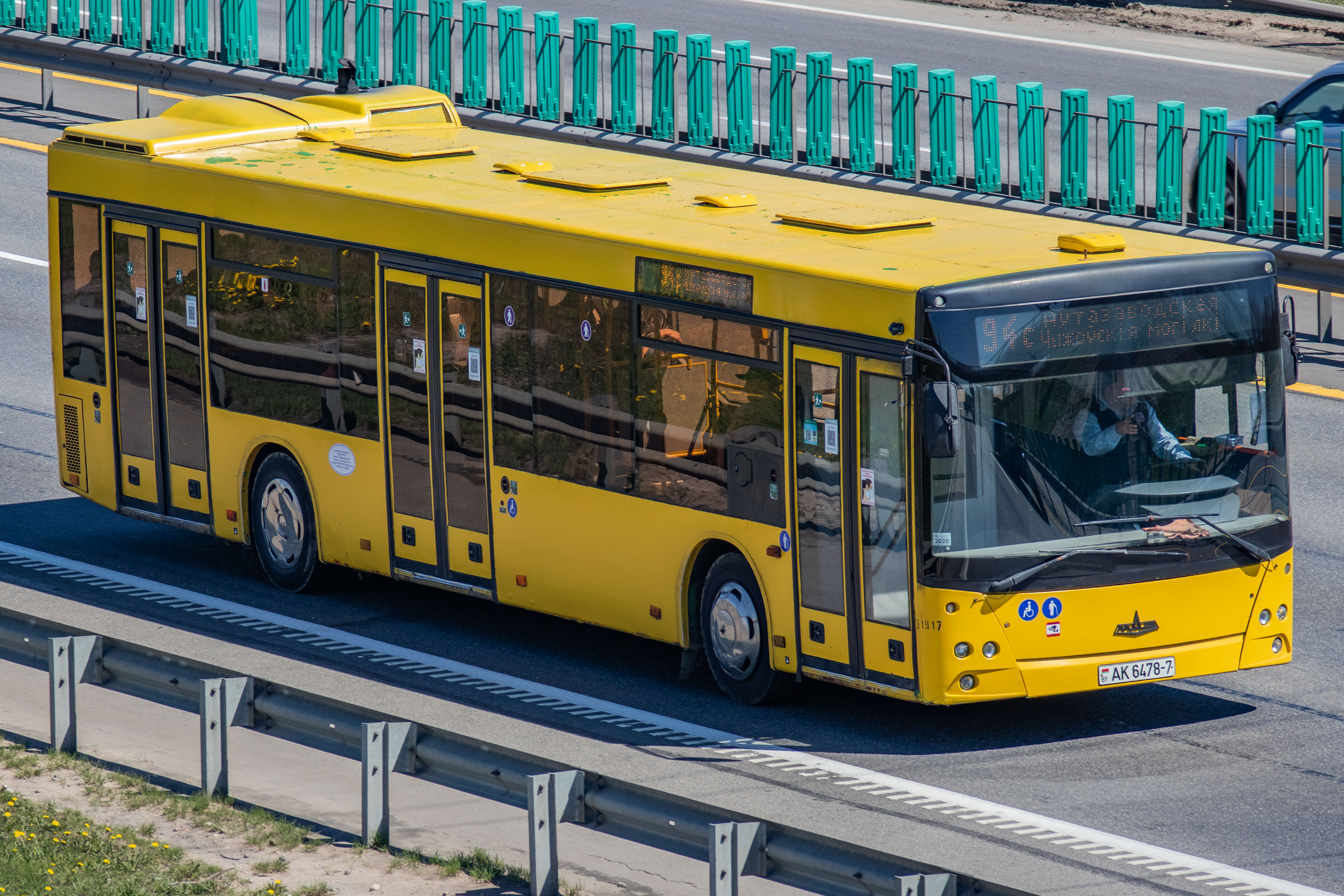
MAZ-203 bus in Minsk

MAZ-203 bus in Elbląg

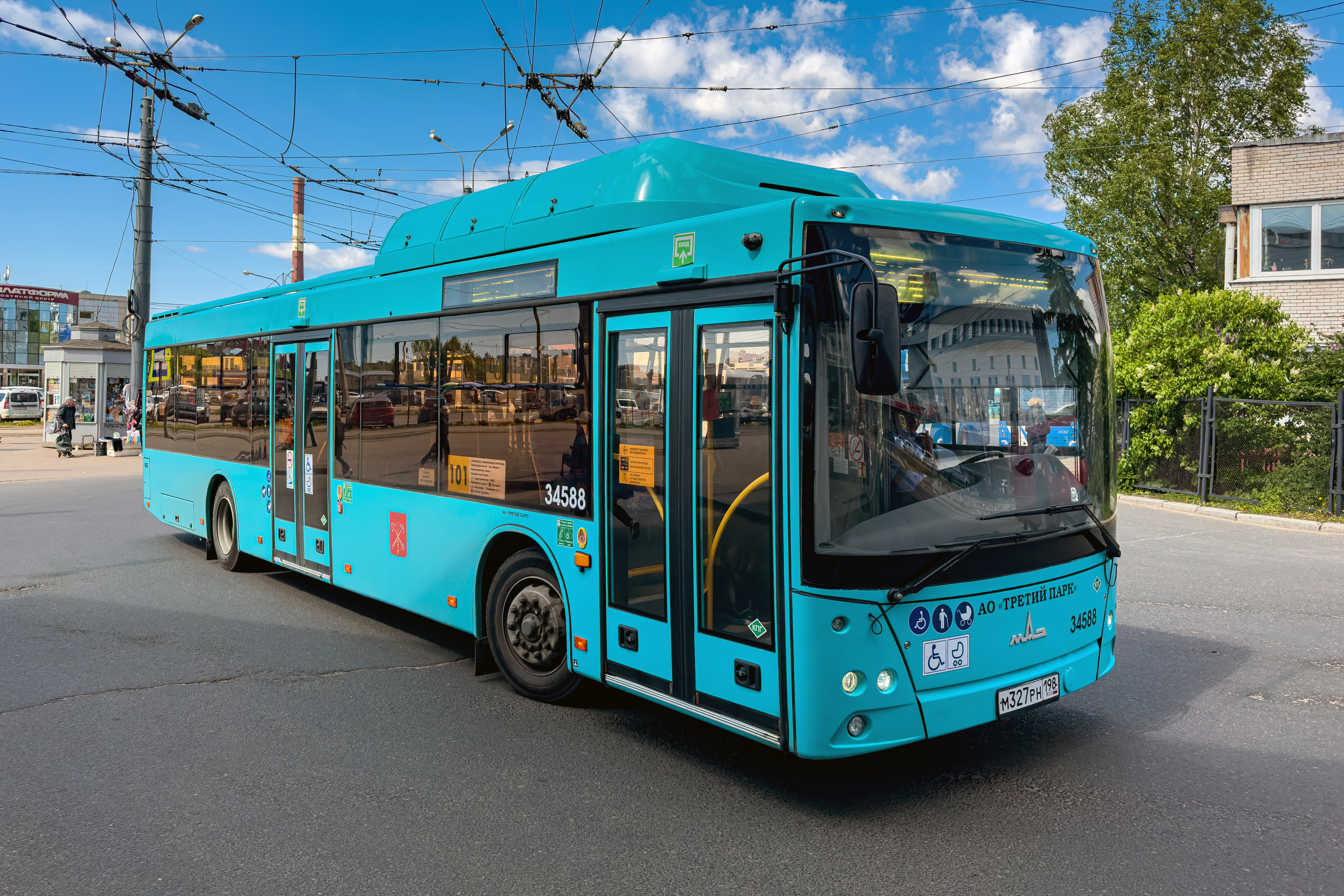
MAZ-203 CNG in Saint Petersburg

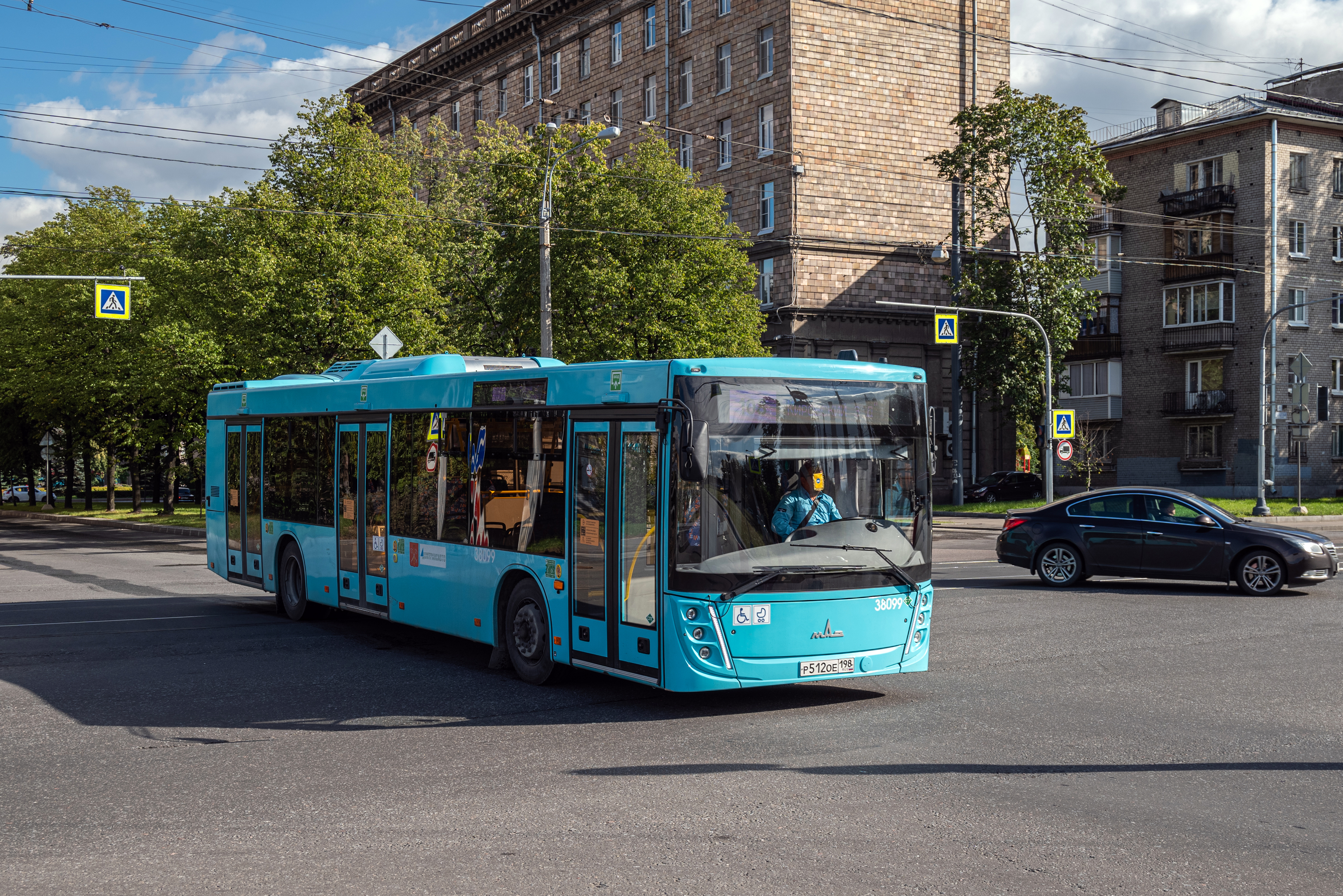
Restyled bus MAZ-203 LNG in Saint Petersburg

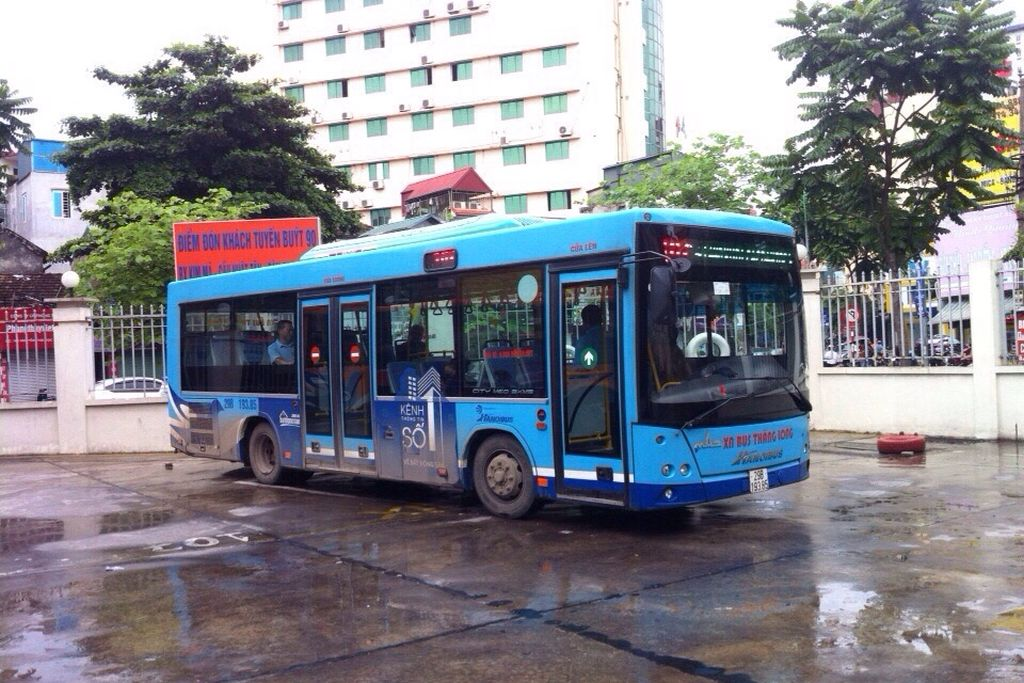
MAZ-206 at Kim Mã Terminal, Hanoi, Vietnam

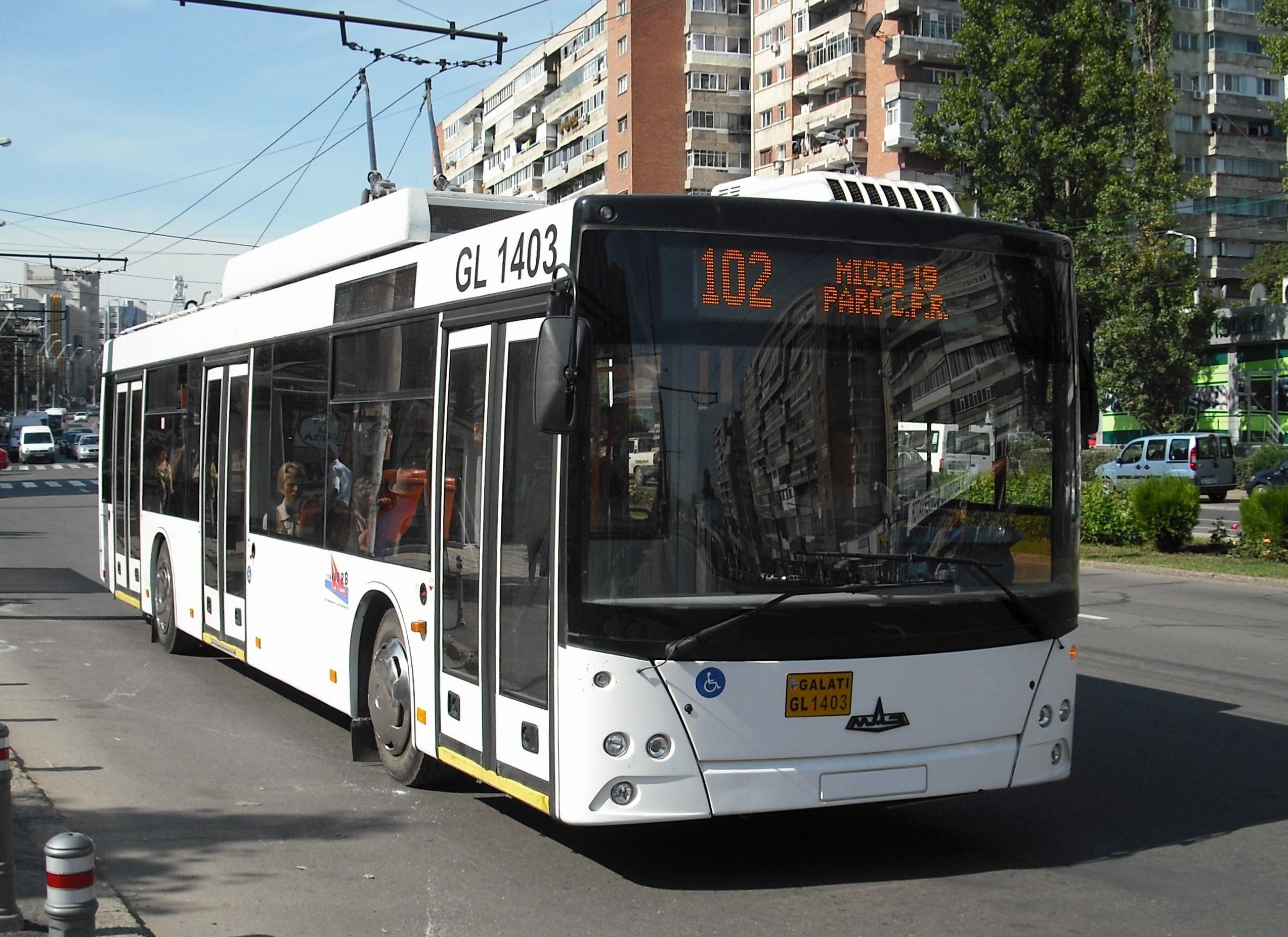
MAZ-203T trolleybus in Galați, Romania

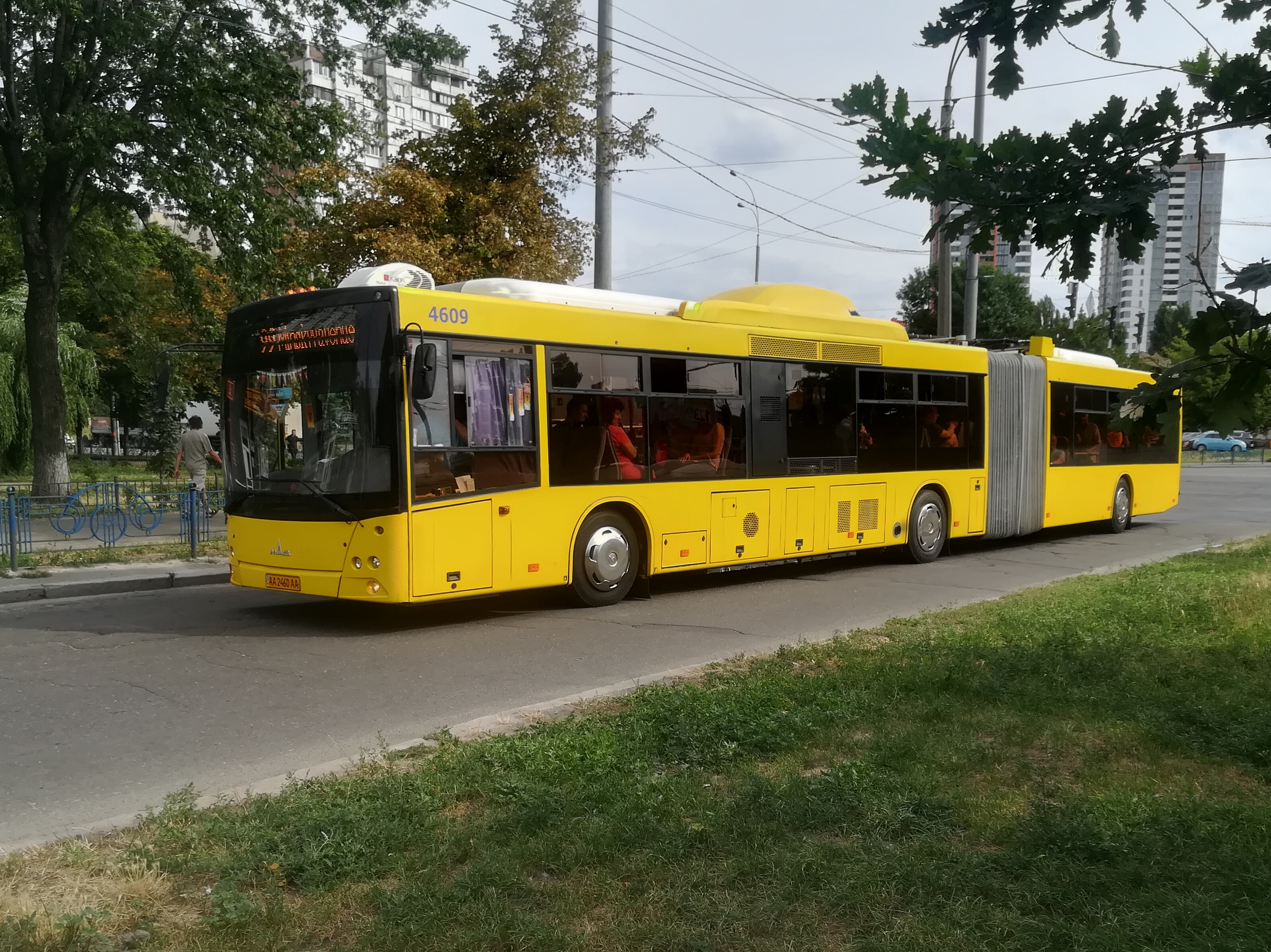
MAZ-215 articulated bus in Kyiv, Ukraine

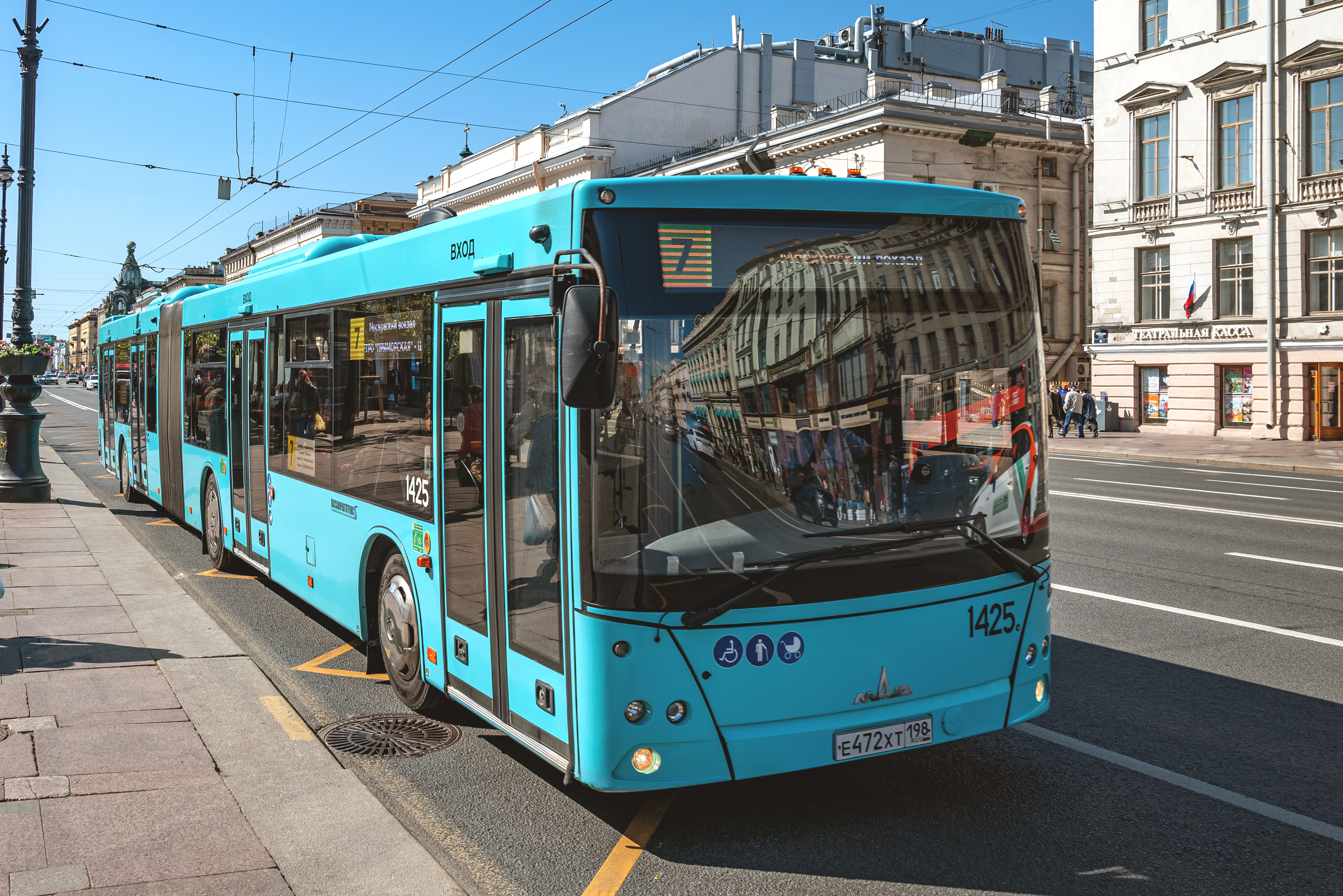
MAZ-216 articulated bus in Saint Petersburg

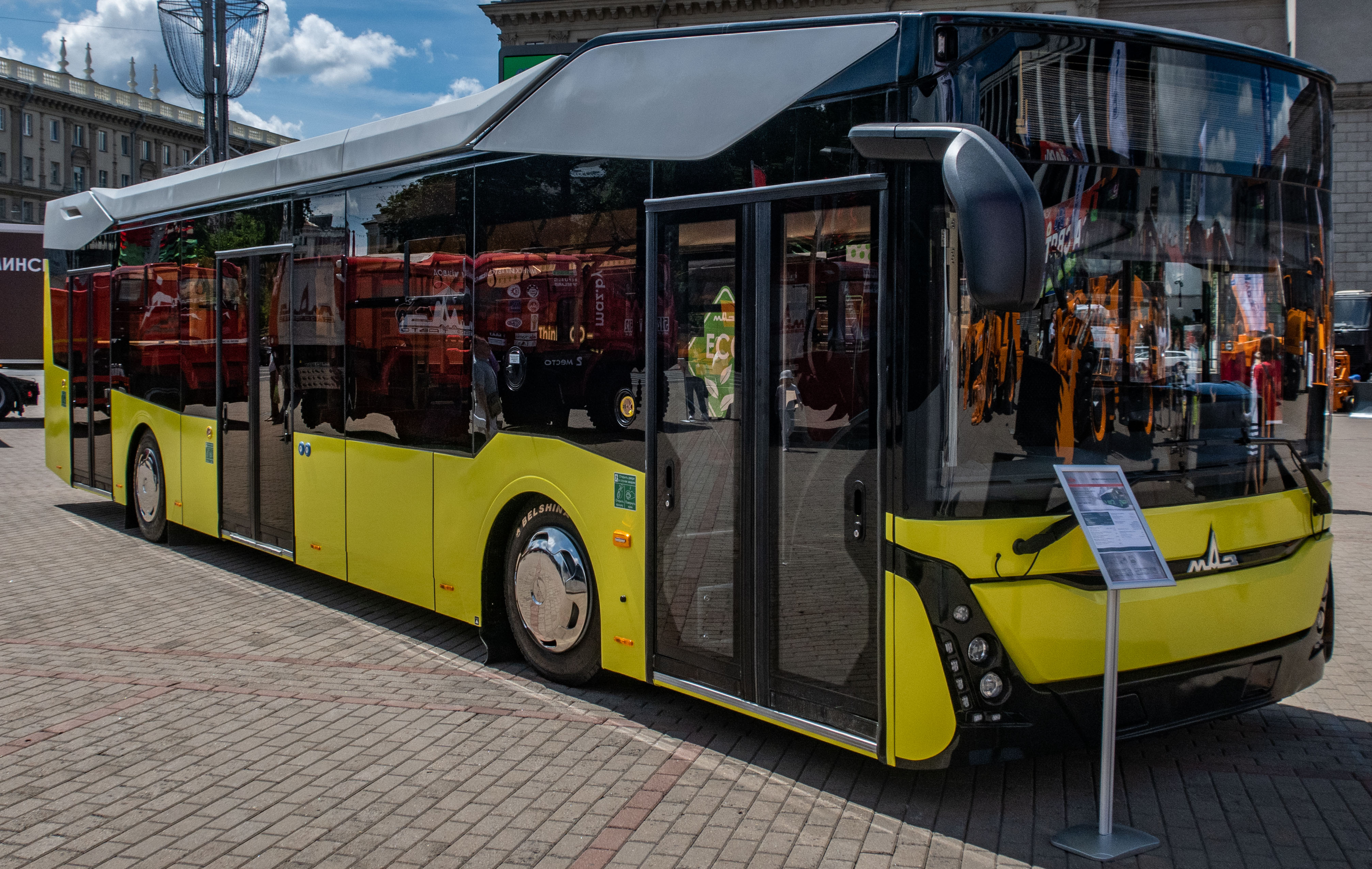
MAZ-303 bus

=== Trucks ===
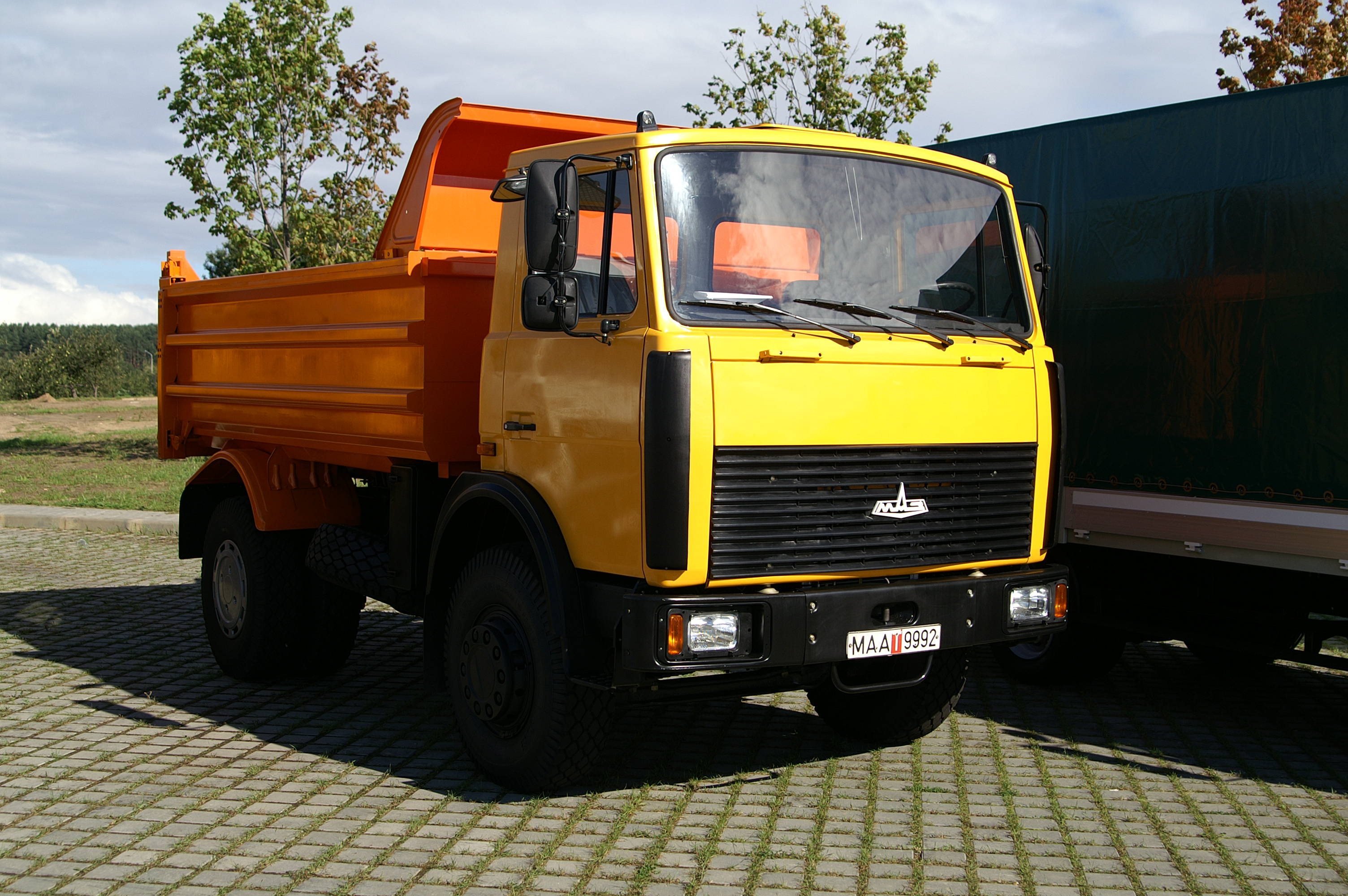
MAZ-5551

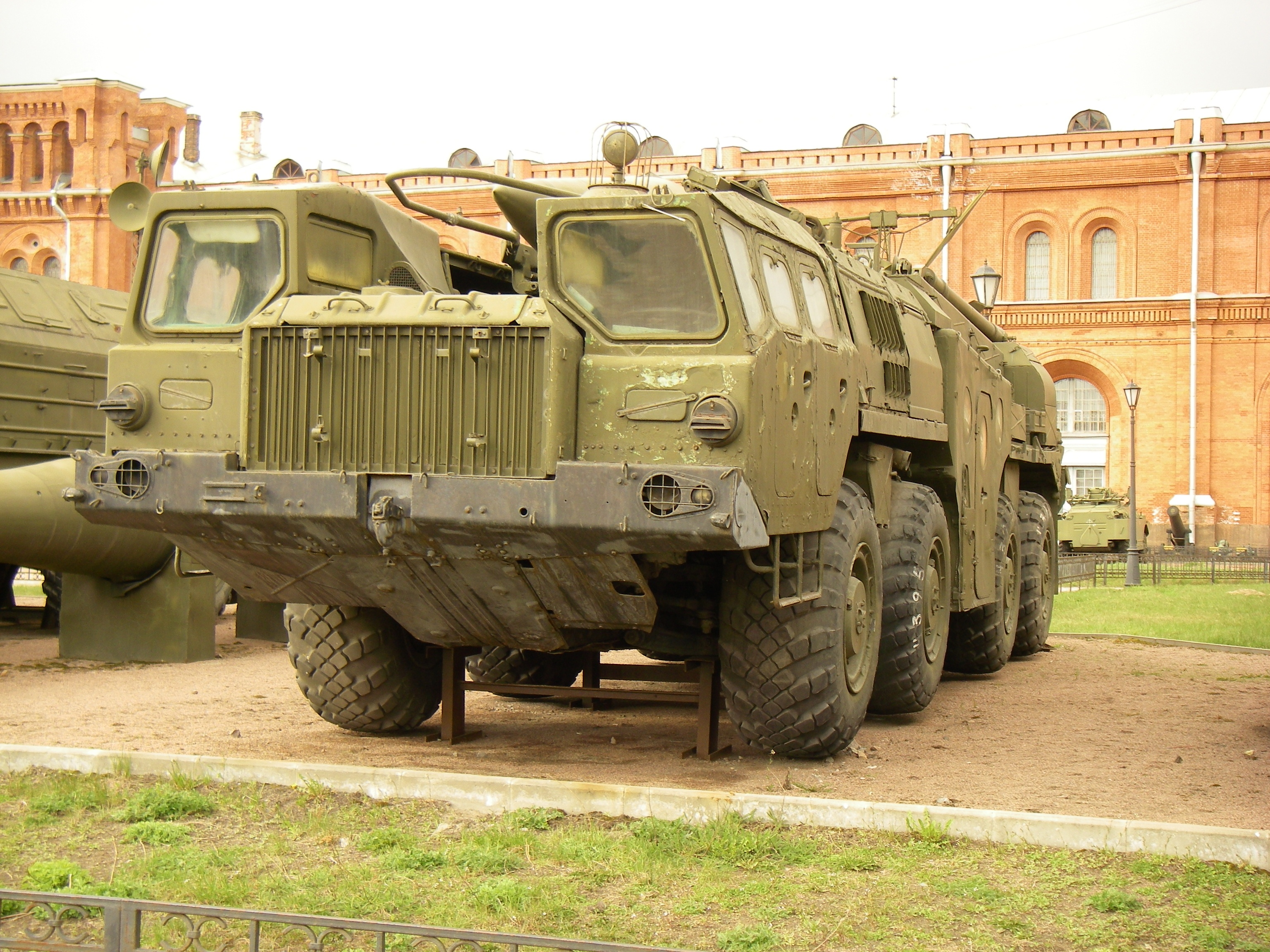
9K72 Elbrus launcher (9P117)

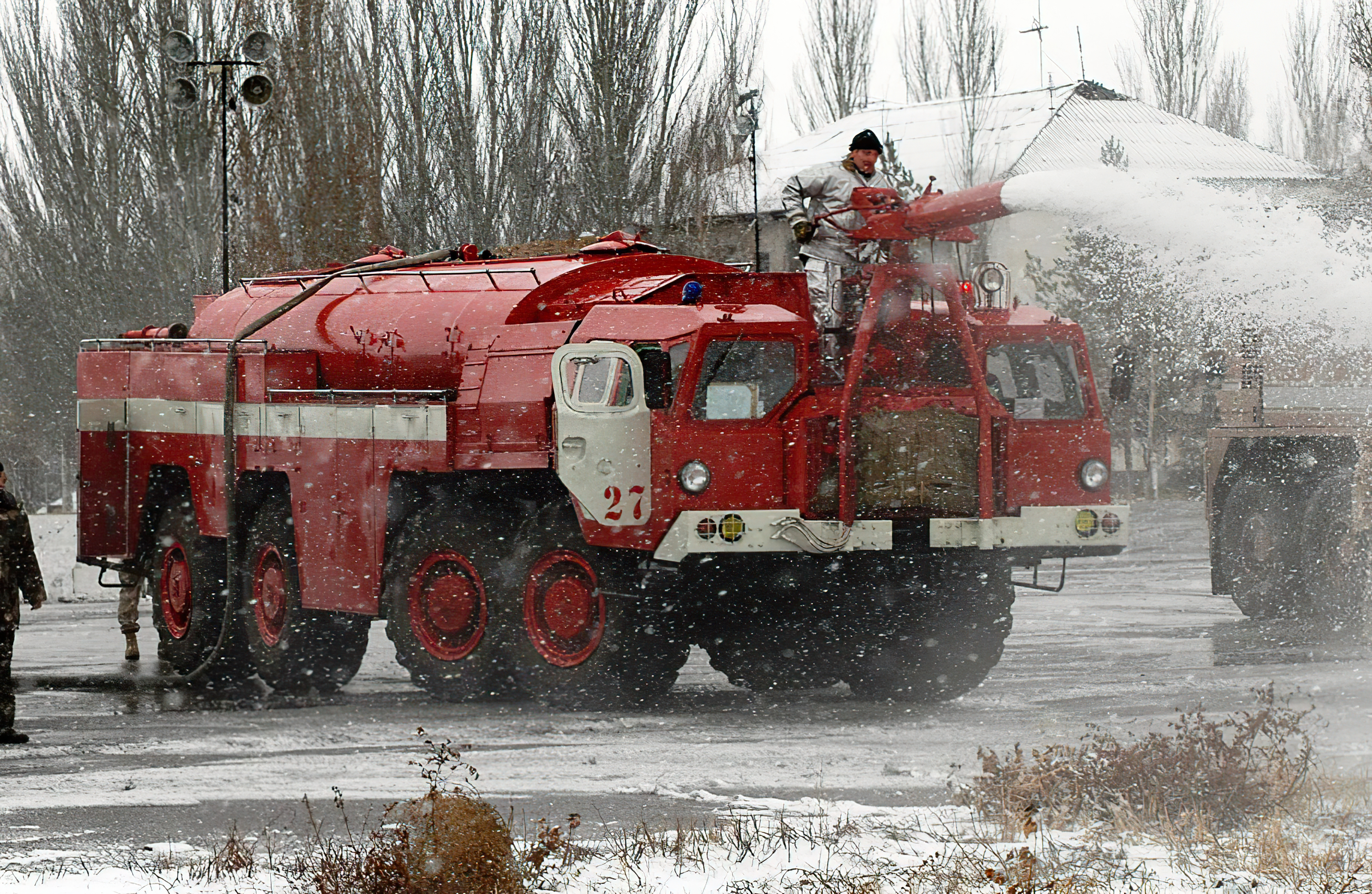
MAZ-543 airport tender, airport in Kyrgyzstan

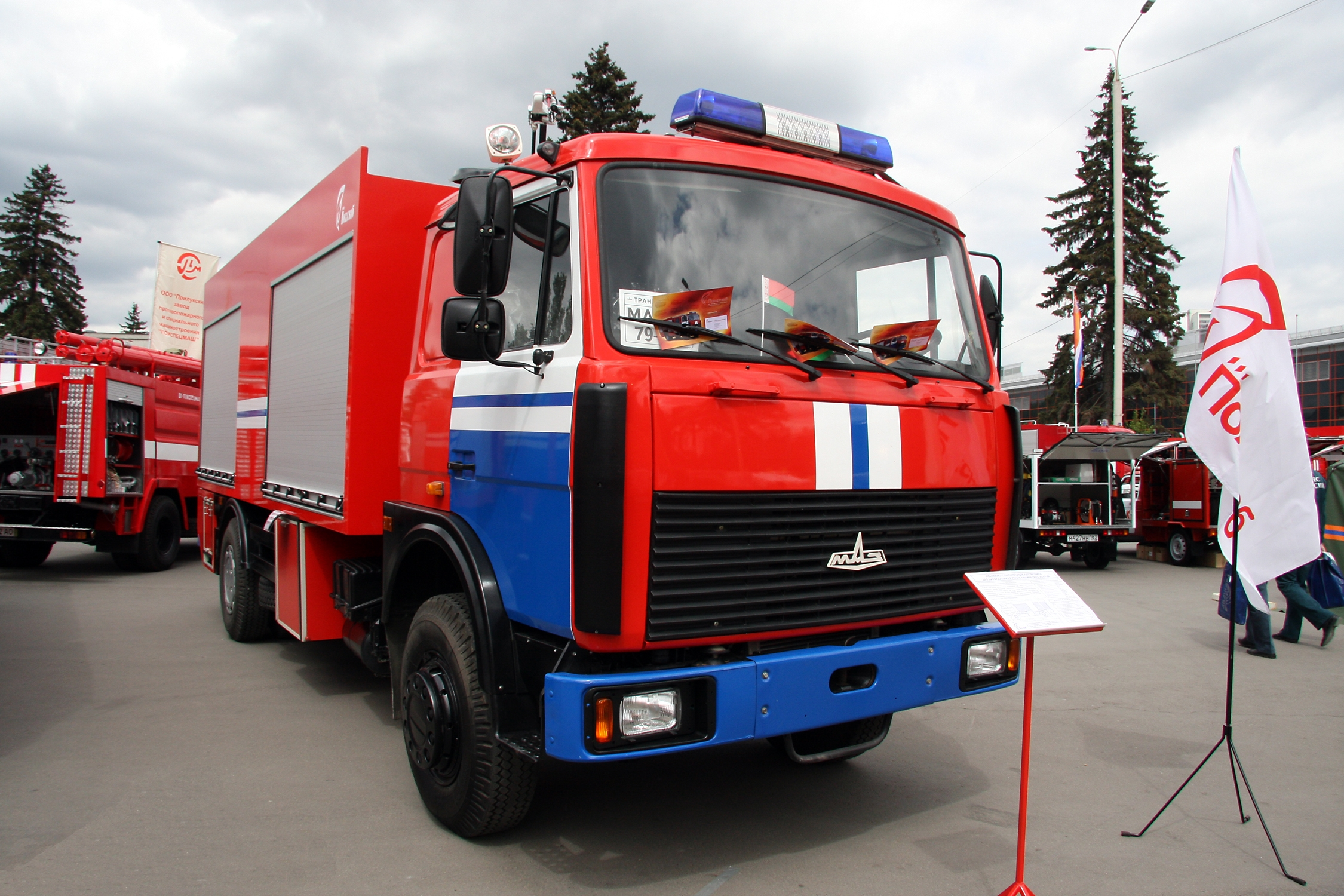
Fire truck ATs 5,0-50-4 on MAZ-5337A2 -01

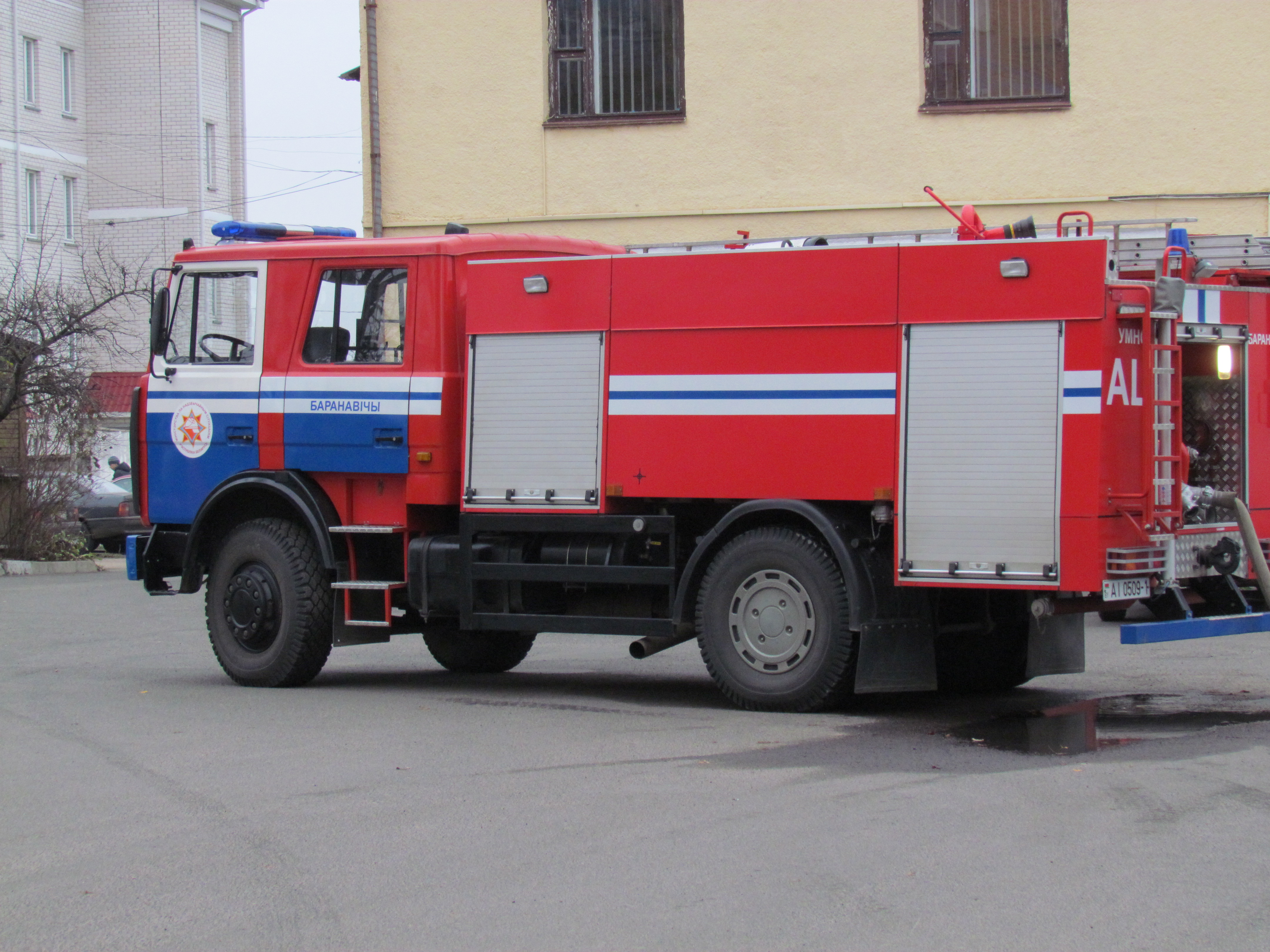
MAZ-5337 Firetruck in Baranavichy, Belarus

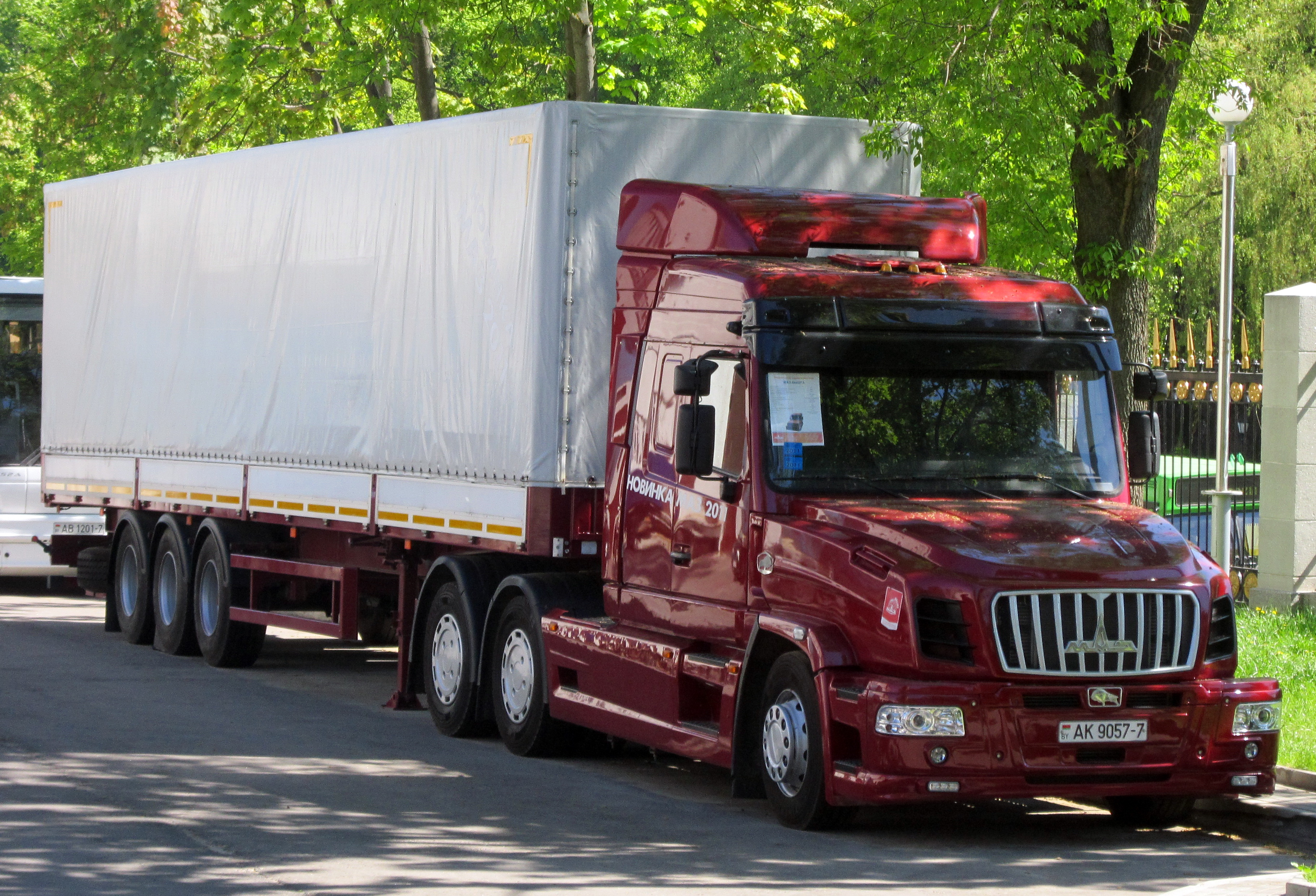
MAZ-6440 conventional cab tractor unit

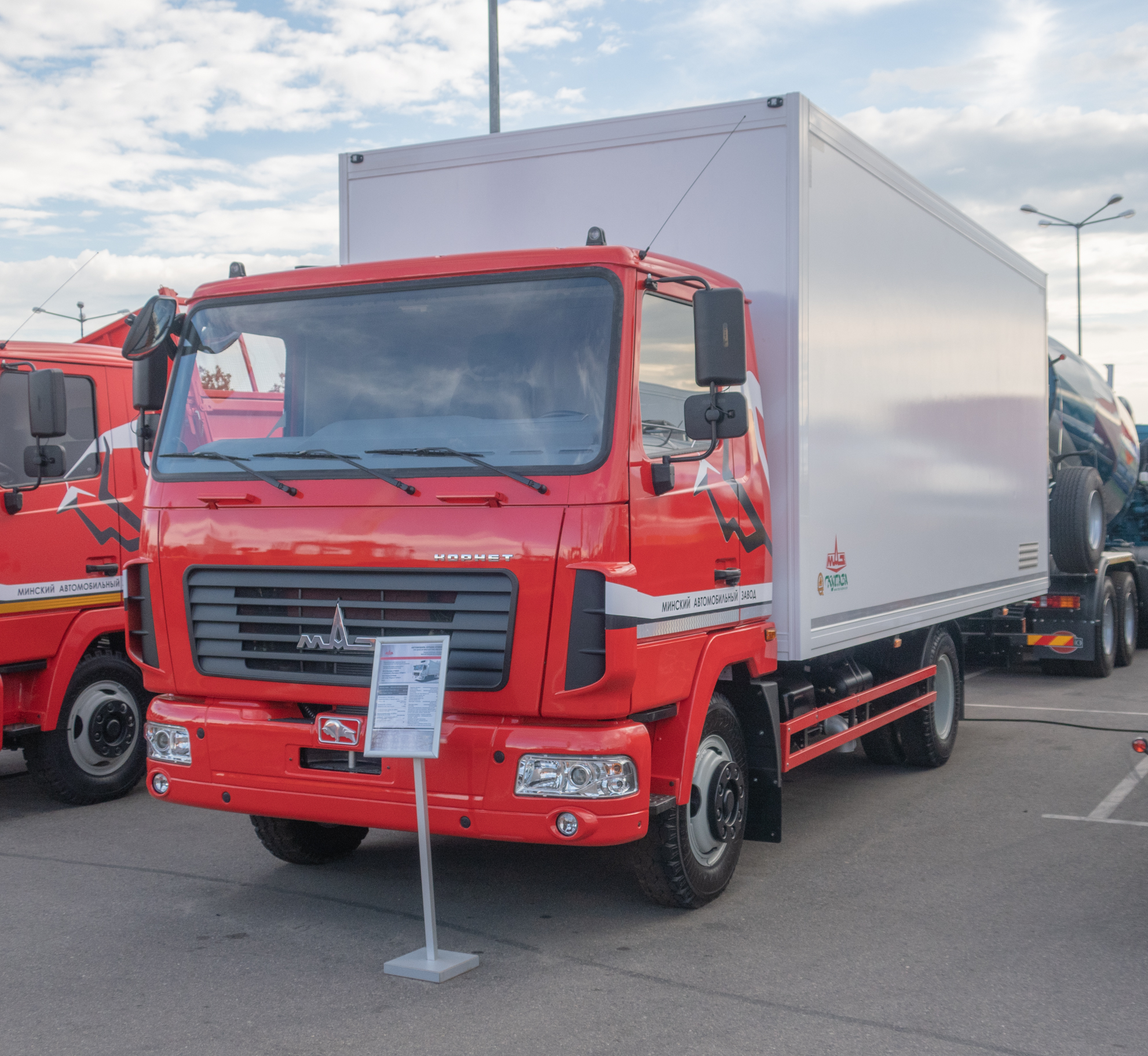
MAZ-4571 box truck

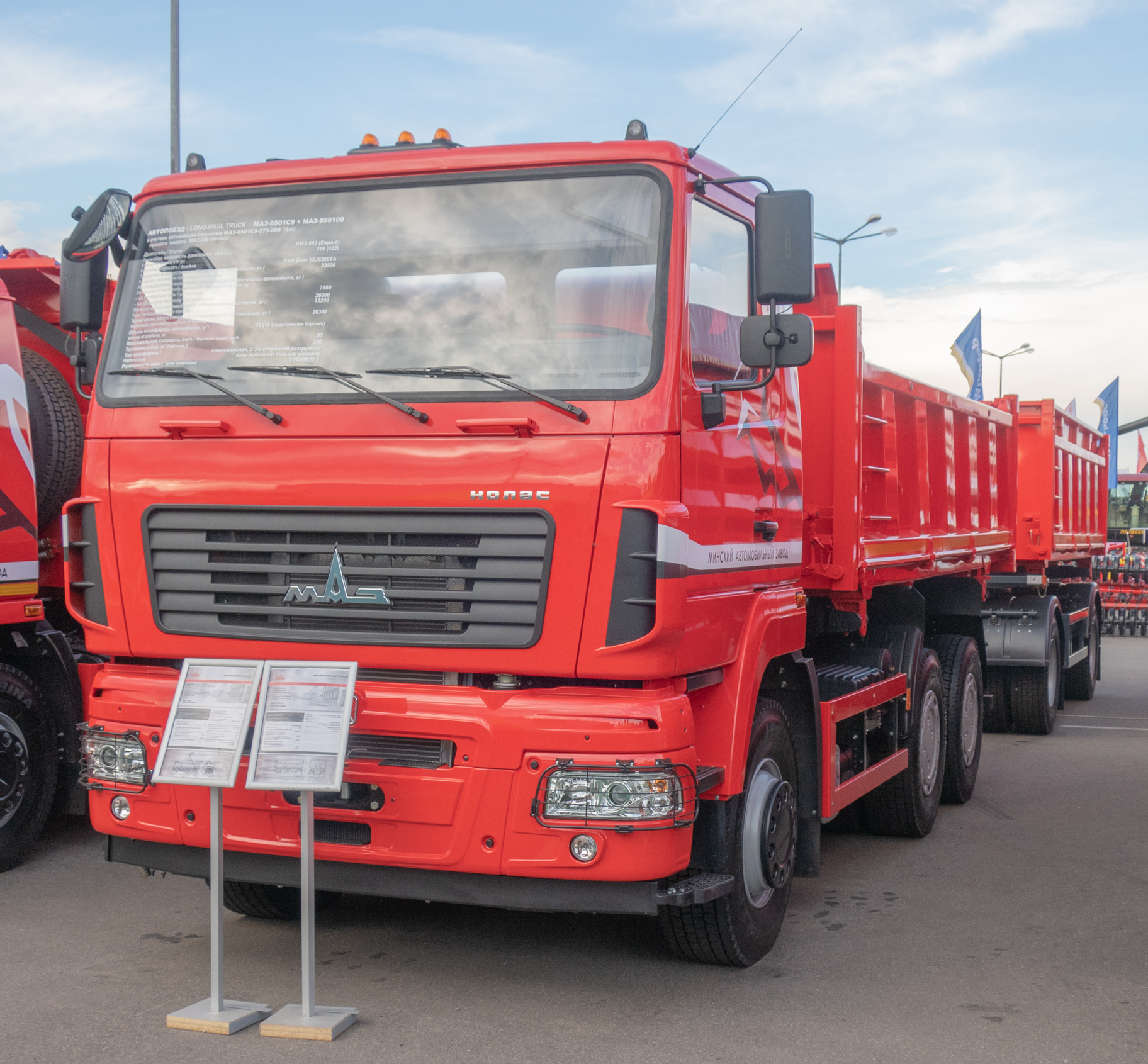
MAZ-6501 flatbed truck with trailer

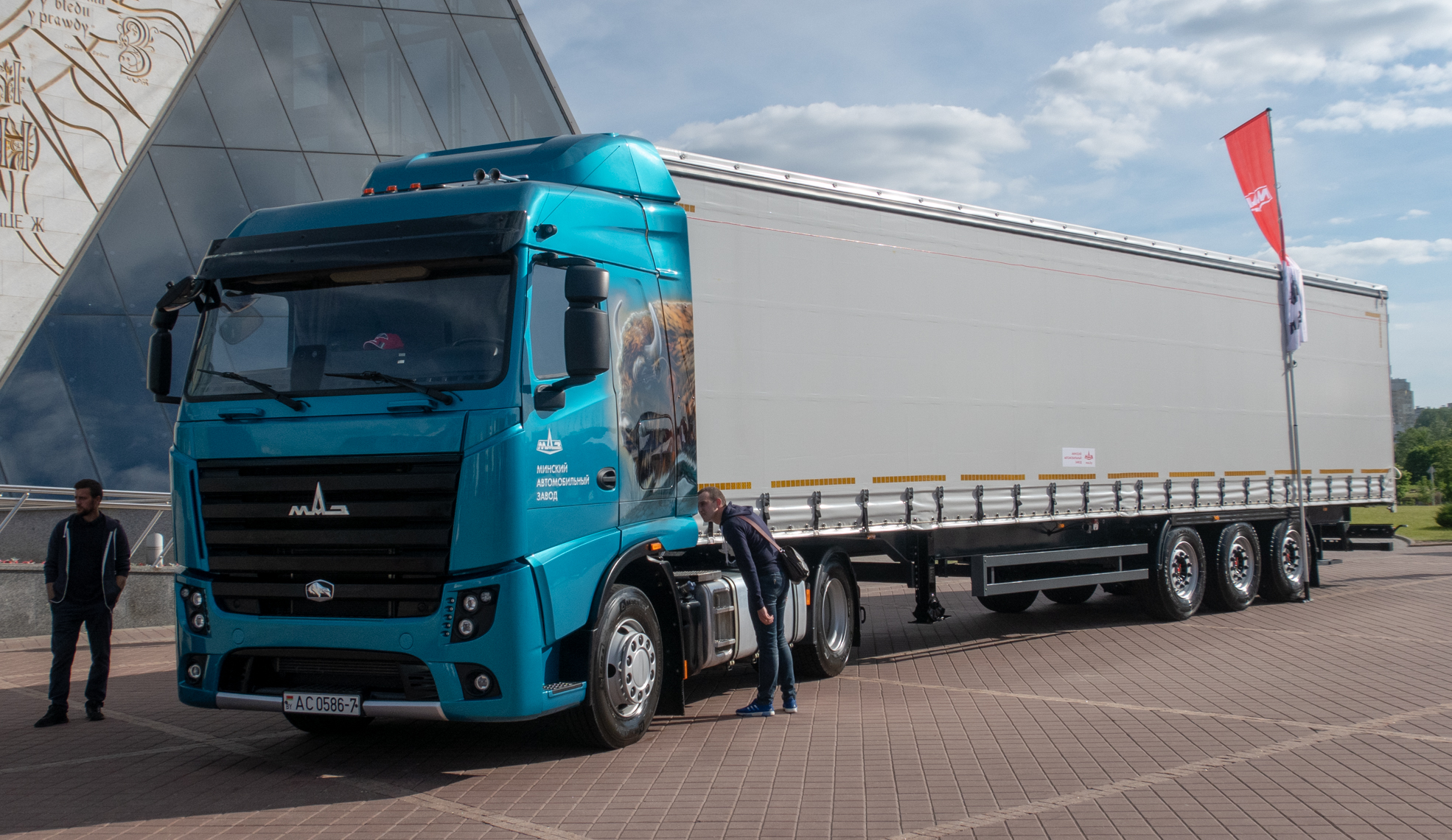
MAZ-5440 semi-trailer truck

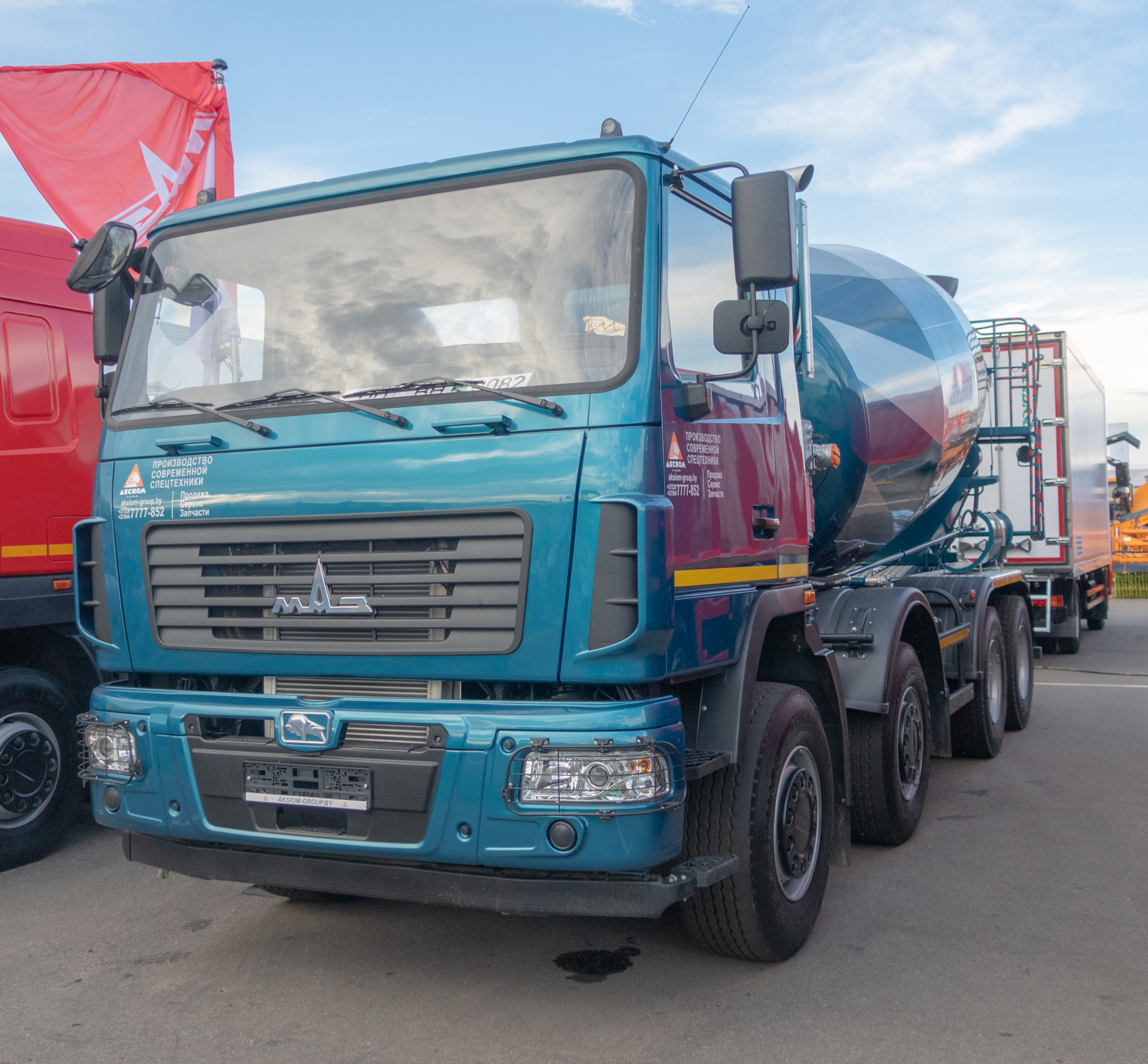
MAZ-6516 concrete mixer truck

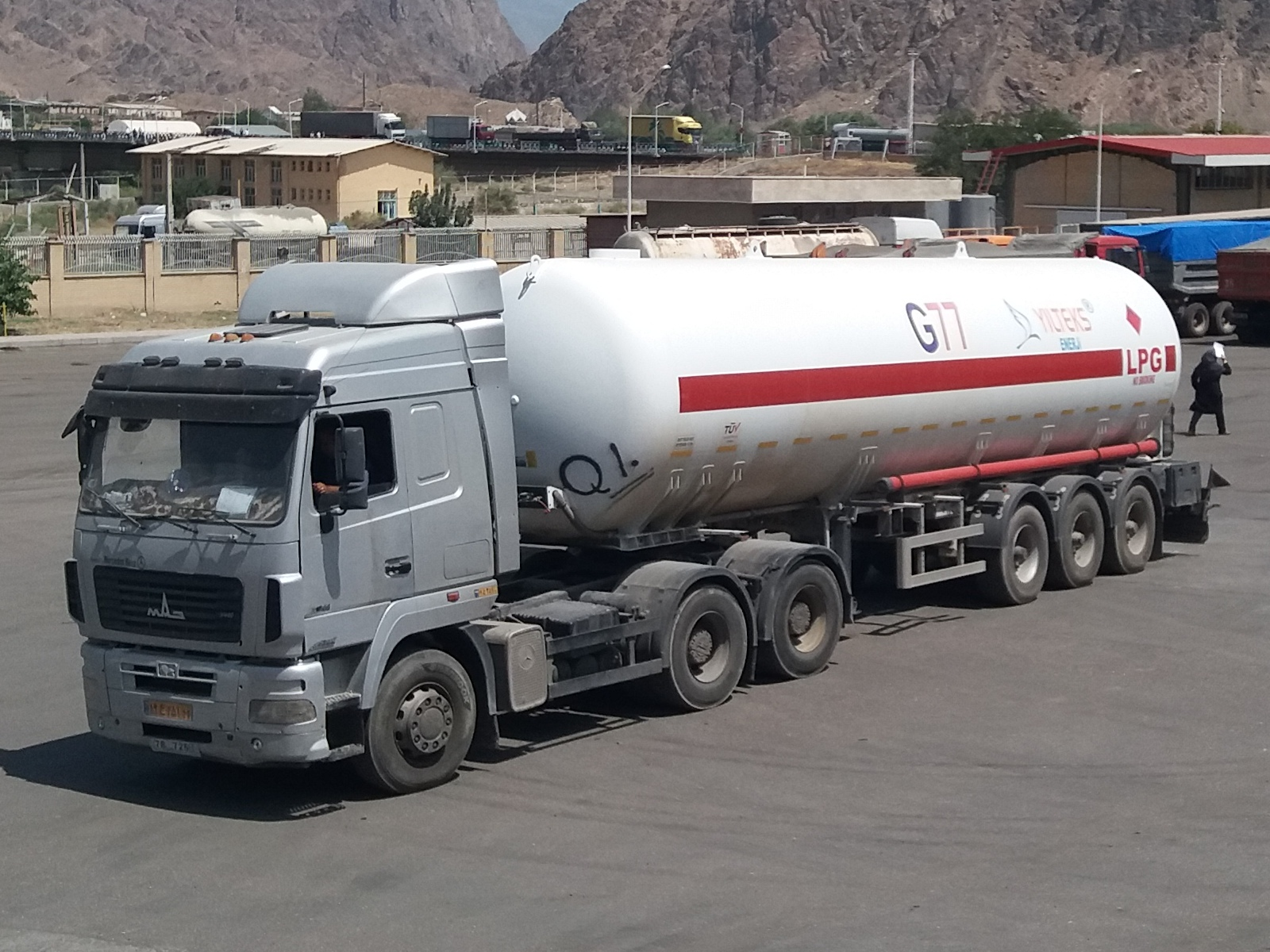
MAZ-6430 tractor unit towing a tank trailer at the border between Armenia and Iran

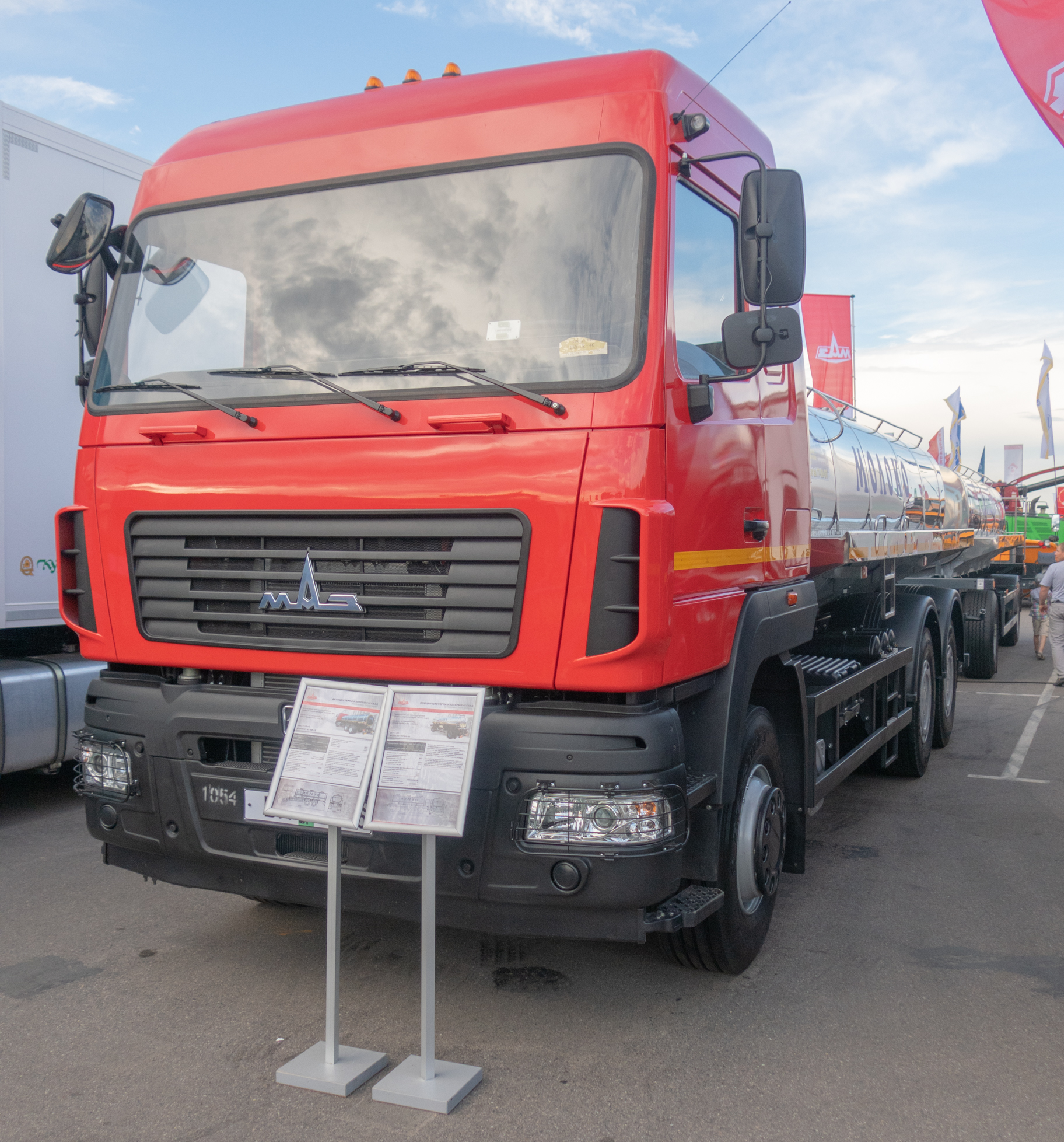
MAZ-6312 milk tank truck

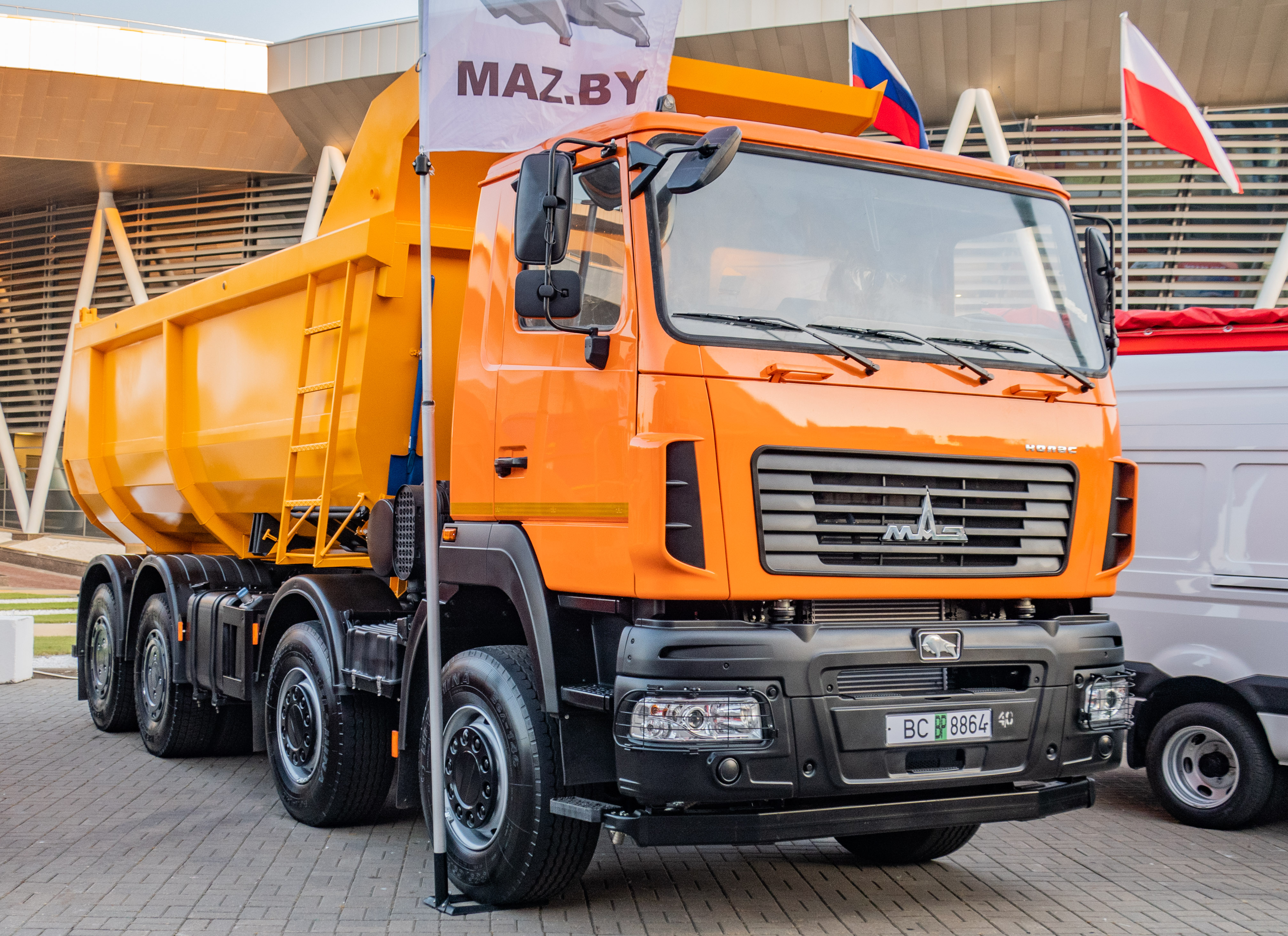
MAZ-6516 dump truck (orange)

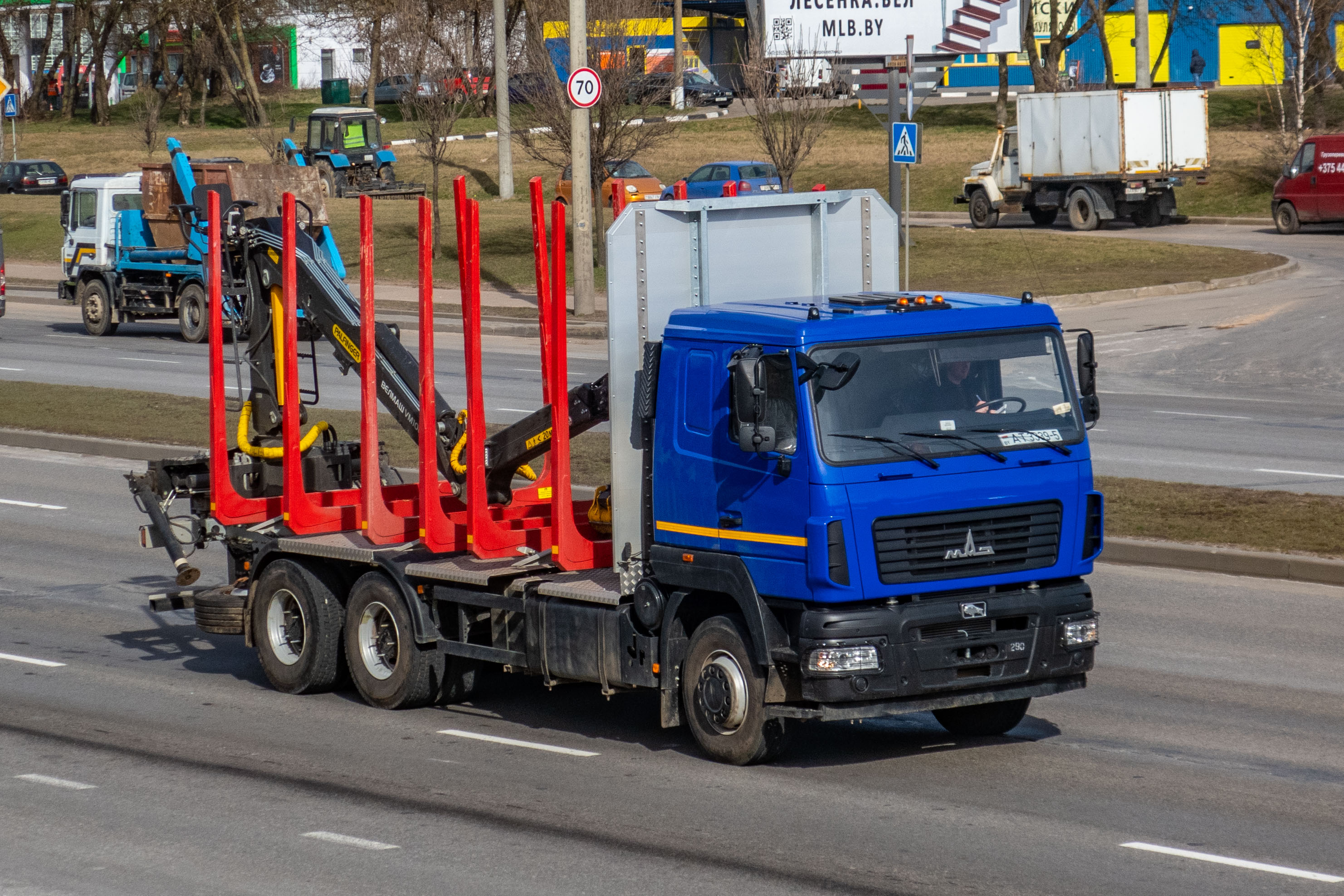
MAZ-6312 logging truck in Minsk
