= 2K6 Luna =

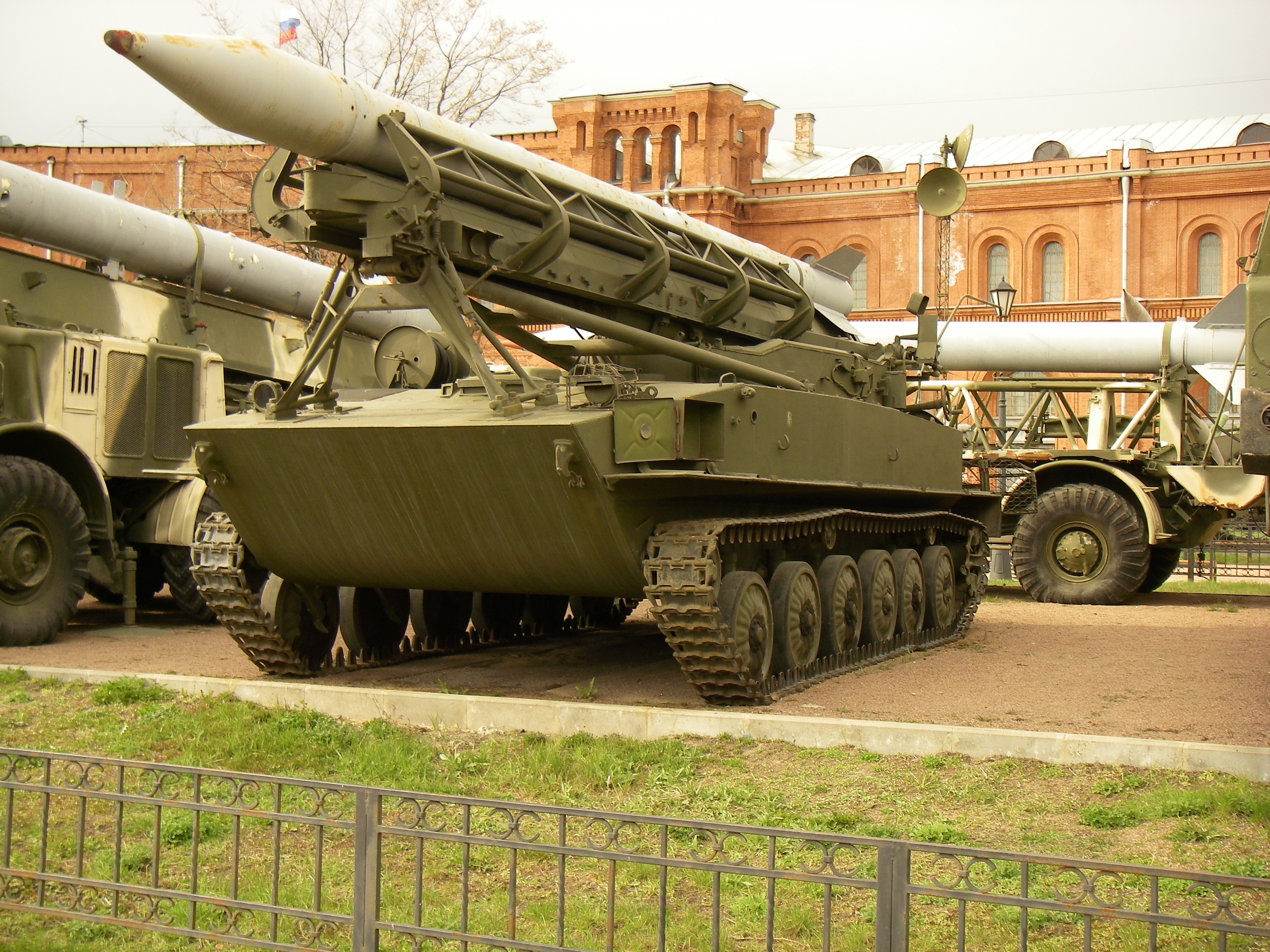
- A 2P16 TEL with a 3R9 missile
- Type: Artillery rocket system
- Place of origin: Soviet Union

Service history
- In service: 1960–1982 (USSR)
- Used by: Soviet Union, Egypt, Syria
- Wars: Yom Kippur War

Production history
- Designer: NII-1 and TsNII-58
- Produced: 1960–1964
- No. built: 432 SPU 2P16
- Variants: 3R10 (nuclear) (FROG-5), 3R9 (HE) (FROG-3)

Specifications
- Crew: 5
- Maximum firing range: 45 km (28 mi) (3R9)
- Warhead: High explosive, nuclear
- Engine: RDTT 3Zh6
- Propellant: Solid fuel
- Guidance system: Ballistic
- Launch platform: 2P16 (PT-76-based)

The 2K6 Luna (Russian: Луна, lit. 'Moon') is a Soviet short-range artillery rocket complex. Luna rockets are solid-fuel, unguided and spin-stabilized. "2K6" is its GRAU designation. Its NATO reporting names are FROG-3 (with 3R9 missile) and FROG-5 (with 3R10 missile). From 1965, the 2K6 Luna was replaced by the far more successful 9K52 Luna-M, which was known in the West as the FROG-7.

== Design history ==
From 1953, the Luna system was developed in the NII-1, under the supervision of N. P. Mazurov. Luna followed the earlier designs 2K1 Mars and 2K4 Filin. While the NII-1 was responsible for the rocket, the launch and transporter-loader vehicles were designed by the TsNII-58. The initial system name was S-125A "Pion". In 1957, the prototypes of the launch vehicle (SPU S-123A on a Ob'yekt 160 chassis), the transloader (TZM S-124A on a Ob'yekt 161 chassis) and the 3R5 rocket were ready for evaluations. These were carried out in 1958 in Kapustin Yar, and in 1959 in the Transbaikal Military District.

As a result of these evaluations, it was decided to abandon the TZM, to improve the SPU and to redesign the rocket. This led to the development of the 3R9 and 3R10 rockets. The decision to start series production was taken in December 1959. The first five systems were ready in January 1960. State acceptance trials were carried out until March 1960. In 1960, the Luna system entered service with the Soviet Army where it remained until 1982. From 1960 to 1964, 432 SPU 2P16s were produced. In the first year alone, 80 launch vehicles and 365 rockets were made on the manufacturing lines.

== System description ==
The missile complex consisted of:

- the launch vehicle SPU 2P16 (Ob'yekt 160), based on a modified PT-76B chassis, with return rollers and fitted with a launch rail, elevation mechanism, stabilizing jacks and a generator. Combat weight was 18 t;
- the rocket 3R9 with conventional HE warhead 3N15 and with a range of 12 to 44.6 km,
- the rocket 3R10 with a 400 kg nuclear warhead 3N14 and with a range of 10 to 32.1 km;
- a 2U663 missile transporter, based on the ZiL-157V, with 2 missiles;
- a 2U662 vehicle to transport and store nuclear warheads;
- a mobile crane ADK K52 (on MAZ-502), ADK K61 (on MAZ-200) or 9T31 (on Ural-375);
- sets of maintenance vehicles PRTB-1, 2U659 etc.;
- control and command vehicle PU-2 and
- a training set with training rocket PV-65 or 3R11 with training warhead 3N16.

There have been a couple of variants of the launch vehicle. For example, the 2P21, also known as the Br-226-II, on a ZiL-134 8x8 truck, but these never entered service.

The FROG-6 is, according to Western sources the NATO designator for the truck-based training system PV-65. Russian sources claim that this system is the prototype of the Br-226-I launch vehicle on KrAZ-214.

== Operational history ==
Luna entered service in 1960 and remained in service with the Soviet Army until 1982. Each Motorised Rifle and Tank Division had one Rocket Battalion with two batteries, each with two 2P16s. During the Cuban Missile Crisis, 36 2K6 missiles, 24 with conventional warheads, 12 with two-kiloton nuclear warheads, with six launchers were located in Cuba. Although some authorities dispute whether local commanders had the authority to use nuclear weapons, they were present and it is argued that if pressured, Soviet soldiers might have used them.

First combat use of the Luna systems was recorded during the initial stages of the Yom Kippur War, used both by Egypt and Syria. On October 6, 1973, the Egyptian 64th Artillery Brigade deployed FROG-3 and FROG-7 launchers armed with HE rockets to support its crossing of the Suez Canal, targeting Israeli rear bases in the Sinai peninsula, including Romani, El Tassa, Om Margam, Om Khshaib and the Mitla Pass. Over the next week, more rockets were fired against those areas and against the El Meleez airfield. The rockets were marginally effective, although one rocket managed to destroy an aircraft on the ground. When the Israelis crossed the Canal themselves, the Egyptians responded with FROG rocket barrages aimed at the bridgehead, with little success.

On the Northern front, the Syrian 69th Rocket Brigade equipped with FROG-2 and FROG-3 systems fired between 20 and 25 rockets against Israeli airfields and other military targets in the Jezreel and Huleh valleys, but they only managed to hit civilian areas, while two stray FROG rockets landed in Jordan.

Early Luna type systems including FROG-3s and FROG-5s were exported to the Warsaw Pact, Algeria, Cuba, Egypt, North Korea, and Syria. As of 2024, they remain in limited service in North Korea where it may be officially referred to as the Hwasong-1.

== Operators ==
=== Current ===
- North Korea − 24 FROG-3, FROG-5, and FROG-7 as of 2024. Chemical and possibly biological warheads produced locally

=== Former ===
- Algeria
- Bulgaria − 36 FROG-3 and FROG-7 launchers in 1990
- Cuba
- East Germany − 13 launchers. Prior to the German reunification, FROG-5 and FROG-7 in East German service were being replaced with the SS-21 Scarab
- Egypt − FROG-3 were systems used by the 64th Artillery Brigade during the Yom Kippur War
- Poland − FROG-3, 21 launchers with 3R9 rockets in 1962–1982
- Romania − 32 launchers in 1990
- Soviet Union − 200 launchers. A few FROG-5 launchers were still used for training duties only prior to the dissolution of the Soviet Union
- Syria − FROG-3 systems were used by the 69th Rocket Brigade during the Yom Kippur War
