= BM-25 (multiple rocket launcher) =

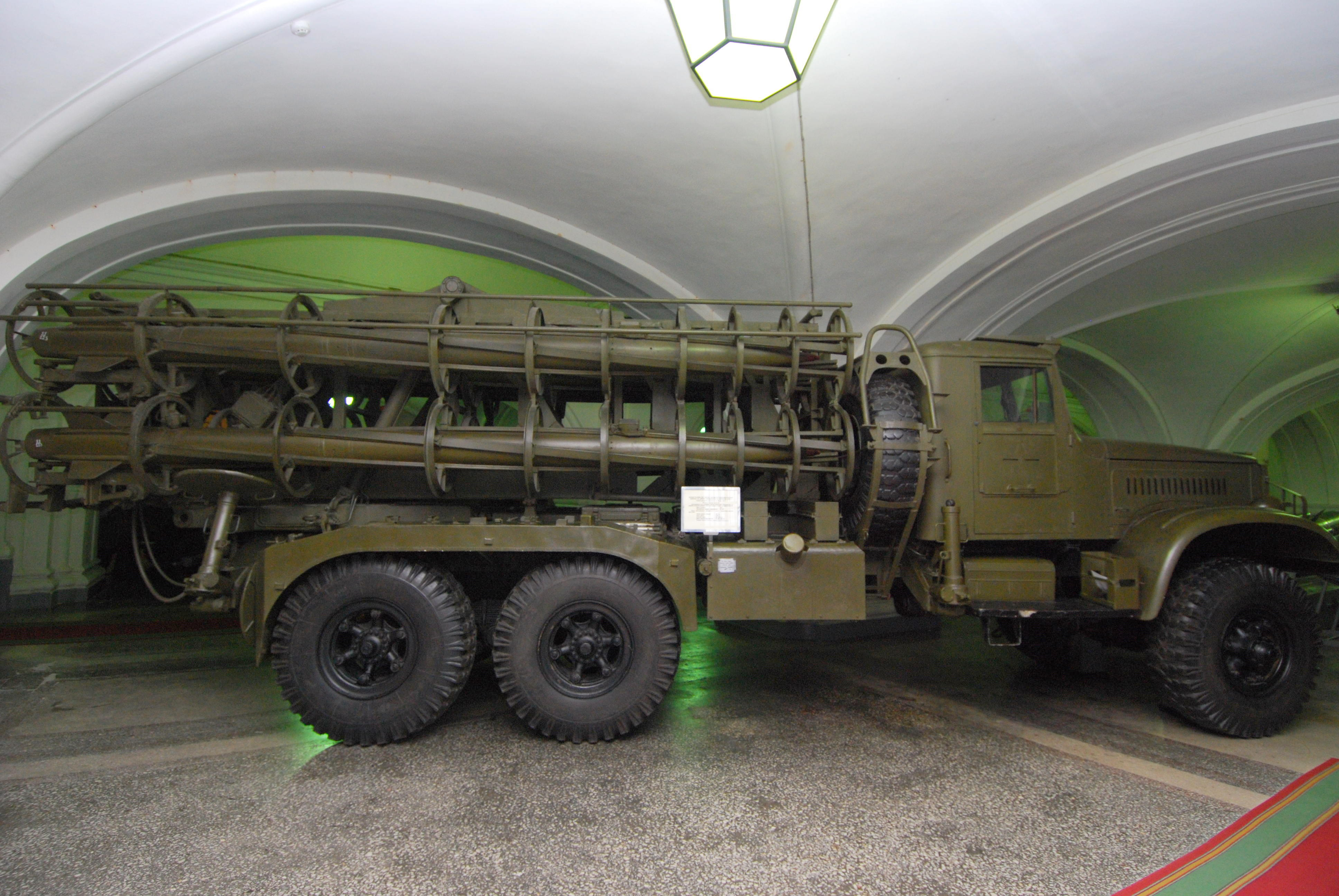
- Type: Multiple rocket launcher
- Place of origin: USSR

Service history
- Used by: USSR; South Yemen

Production history
- Designer: NII-88
- Designed: 1953
- Produced: 1957-1960

Specifications
- Mass: 18,145 kg (40,003 lb)
- Length: 9.8 m (32 ft 2 in)
- Width: 2.7 m (8 ft 10 in)
- Height: 3.5 m (11 ft 6 in)
- Crew: 8-12
- Shell: Length: 5.8 m (19 ft 0 in); Weight: 455 kg (1,003 lb)
- Caliber: 250 mm (9.8 in)
- Barrels: 6
- Elevation: 0° - 55°
- Traverse: 6°
- Effective firing range: 30 km (19 mi)
- Maximum firing range: 55 km (34 mi)
- Engine: YaMZ-206B 6-cylinder 205 HP diesel
- Suspension: KrAZ-214 6x6 truck chassis
- Operational range: 530 km (330 mi)
- Maximum speed: 55 km/h (34 mph)

The BM-25 Korshun (Kite) as its Russian (GRAU designation 2K5) name was a multiple rocket launcher designed in the Soviet Union. It was capable of launching 3R7 250 mm rockets from six launch tubes. The support vehicle is a YAZ-214.

== Development ==
The system was developed in scientific research institute NII-88 in 1953. Its rockets were propelled by a mix of kerosene and nitric acid. It has a range of 55km but was inaccurate.

== Use ==
Due to severe inaccuracy of the rocket, only a small quantity were produced in the USSR from 1957 to 1960. It was exported to South Yemen, which used it against North Yemen.

== See also ==
- Katyusha rocket launcher

== Notes ==
- Prenatt, Jamie; Hook, Adam (2016). Katyusha – Russian Multiple Rocket Launchers 1941–Present. New Vanguard 235. Oxford: Osprey Publishing Ltd. ISBN 978-1-4728-1086-1.
