= BM25 =

BM25 may refer to:

- BM-25 (multiple rocket launcher), a Soviet multiple rocket launcher
- BM-25 Musudan, a North Korean intermediate-range ballistic missile thought to be designed in the 1960s and made in the 1970s, it was seen in the late 1980s by photographers
- Okapi BM25, a ranking function in information retrieval
