= 29K anti-aircraft gun =

ZSU 29-K
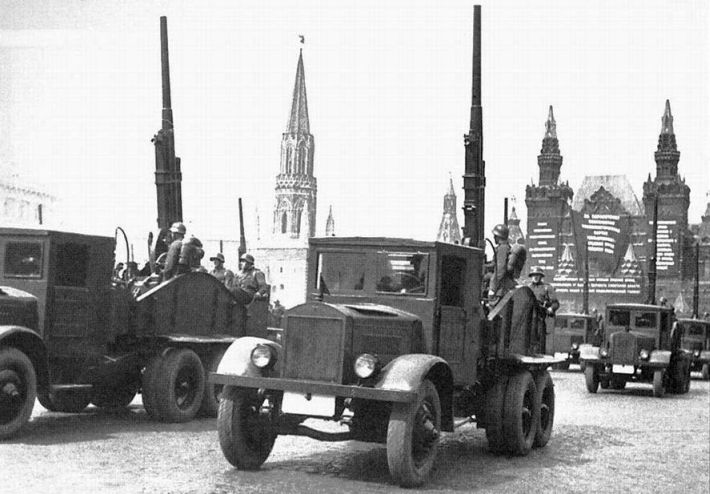
- Type: Anti-aircraft truck
- Place of origin: Soviet Union

Service history
- In service: 1936–1941
- Used by: Soviet Union
- Wars: World War II

Production history
- Designer: Design Bureau (KB); Plant No. 8
- Designed: 1935
- Manufacturer: Yaroslavl Automobile Plant
- Produced: 1935–1937
- No. built: 61 units

Specifications
- Mass: 10.55 t (10.4 long tons; 11.6 short tons)
- Length: 7.630 m (25 ft 0.4 in)
- Width: 2.470 m (8 ft 1.2 in)
- Crew: 5
- Shell: Fixed QF 76.2 × 558mm R
- Shell weight: 6.6 kg (14 lb 9 oz)
- Caliber: 76.2 mm (3.00 in)
- Elevation: −3° to 82°
- Traverse: 360°
- Rate of fire: 10–20 rpm
- Muzzle velocity: 815 m/s (2,670 ft/s)
- Maximum firing range: 14,600 m (16,000 yd)
- Sights: Telescopic sight
- Main armament: 76 mm air defense gun M1931; 48 rounds
- Engine: Herkules YXC; 93.5 hp
- Power/weight: 8.77 hp/ton
- Drive: 6×4
- Ground clearance: Max slope angle: 20°; Wade depth: 0.65 m (2.13 ft)
- Operational range: 270 km (170 miles)
- Maximum speed: 45 km/h (28 mph)

The 29-K was an anti-aircraft truck used by the Soviet Union, consisting of a 76 mm air defense gun M1931 mounted on a YaG-10 truck.

== History ==
In 1934, the Design Bureau (KB) Plant No. 8, named after Mikhail Kalinin, received an order to install the 76 mm air defense gun M1931 on the chassis of the three-axle YaG-10 truck. Production completed by the Yaroslavl Automobile Plant, due to their experience with creating the SU-8.

In August–September 1936, tests were carried out at the NIAP test site. The first vehicles entered service with Moscow Military District.

The 29-K took part in the parade on Red Square in Moscow. The first display of motorized anti-aircraft guns took place at a military parade in Moscow on 1 May 1934. Overall, sixty-one YaG-10 trucks were converted into 29-K models.

Modifications to the trucks included a reinforced undercarriage, four stabilizing legs with jacks were added to the underside, rotating pedestal for the gun, and side boards replaced with semi-circular armor plates that could be reclined in combat to create additional space for the crew to operate.
