= 76 mm air defense gun M1931 =

76 mm air defense gun M1931 (3-K)
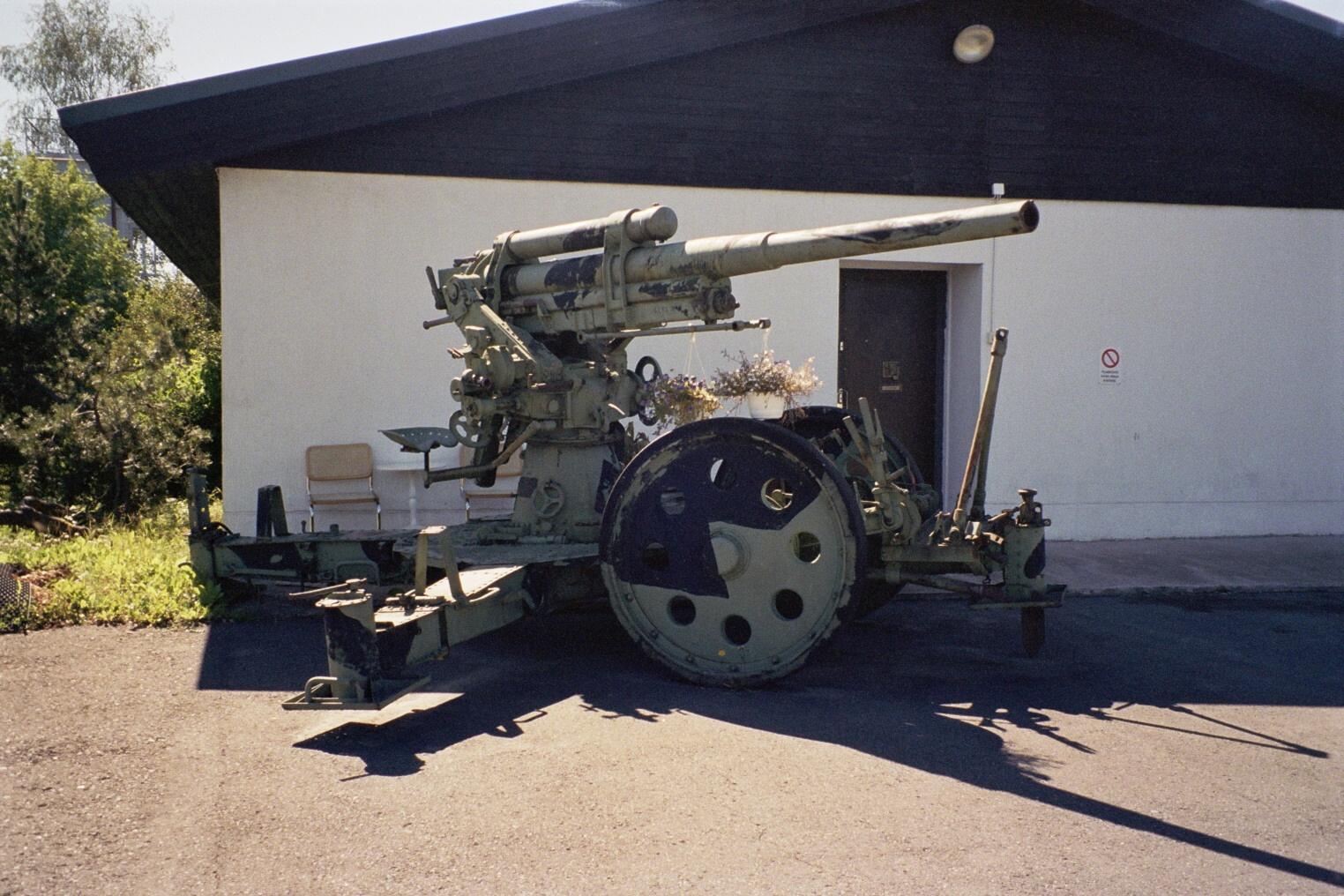
- 76 mm M1931 at Kempele, Finland.
- Type: Anti-aircraft gun
- Place of origin: Soviet Union

Service history
- In service: 1932–1977
- Used by: See § Users
- Wars: Spanish Civil War; Winter War; World War II

Production history
- Designer: Original design: Rheinmetall; Soviet official credit: G. P. Tagunov
- Designed: 1931
- Manufacturer: Red Putilovite plant
- Developed into: 76 mm air defense gun M1938
- Produced: 1931–1938

Specifications
- Mass: Travel: 4,820 kg (10,630 lb); Combat: 3,650 kg (8,050 lb)
- Barrel length: Overall: 4.1 m (13.45 ft) L/55; Rifling: 3.37 m (11.06 ft) L/44.2
- Crew: 10
- Shell: Fixed QF 76.2×558mmR
- Shell weight: 6.6 kg (14 lb 9 oz)
- Caliber: 76.2 mm (3.00 in)
- Breech: Semi-automatic vertical sliding-wedge
- Recoil: Hydro-pneumatic
- Carriage: Two-wheeled carriage with collapsible cruciform outriggers
- Elevation: −3° to +82°
- Traverse: 360°
- Rate of fire: 10 – 20 rpm
- Muzzle velocity: 815 m/s (2,670 ft/s)
- Maximum firing range: 9.3 km (31,000 ft) AA ceiling

The 76 mm air defense gun M1931 (3-K) (Russian: 76-мм зенитная пушка обр. 1931 г. (3-K)) was an anti-aircraft gun used by the Soviet Union during the Winter War and the first stages of World War II.

== History ==
Based on the design made by German company Rheinmetall, the configuration of the air defense gun M1931 is similar to the design of the contemporary Vickers 3-inch anti-aircraft guns. The Soviet M1931 had a two-wheeled carriage with collapsible cruciform outriggers.

The M1931 was replaced in production in 1938 by the 76 mm air defense gun M1938 which had a four-wheeled dual-axle carriage with two collapsible outriggers. The M1931 and M1938 had nearly identical performance and were gradually replaced by the more powerful 85 mm air defense gun M1939.

M1931 guns captured by the Germans were given the designation 7.62 cm Flak M.31(r) and used until they were either worn out or their ammunition supply ran out. A few were rebored to fire German 8.8 cm ammunition and redesignated the 7.62/8.8 cm Flak M.31(r). However, the majority were scrapped in 1944.

=== Finland ===
A number of M1931 guns were captured by Finland during the Winter War and were employed by them as the 76 ItK/31 ss during World War II.

After the war, a number of Finnish guns were converted into light coastal guns (76 ItK 31 Rt, where "Rt" stands for "rannikkotykistö" = coastal artillery) by the addition of a scope site with manual lead mechanism for direct fire against moving surface targets. These guns were still in use as training guns of the coastal artillery into the 1980s.

== Users ==
- Germany
- Finland
- Soviet Union
- Spanish Republic

== Photo Gallery ==
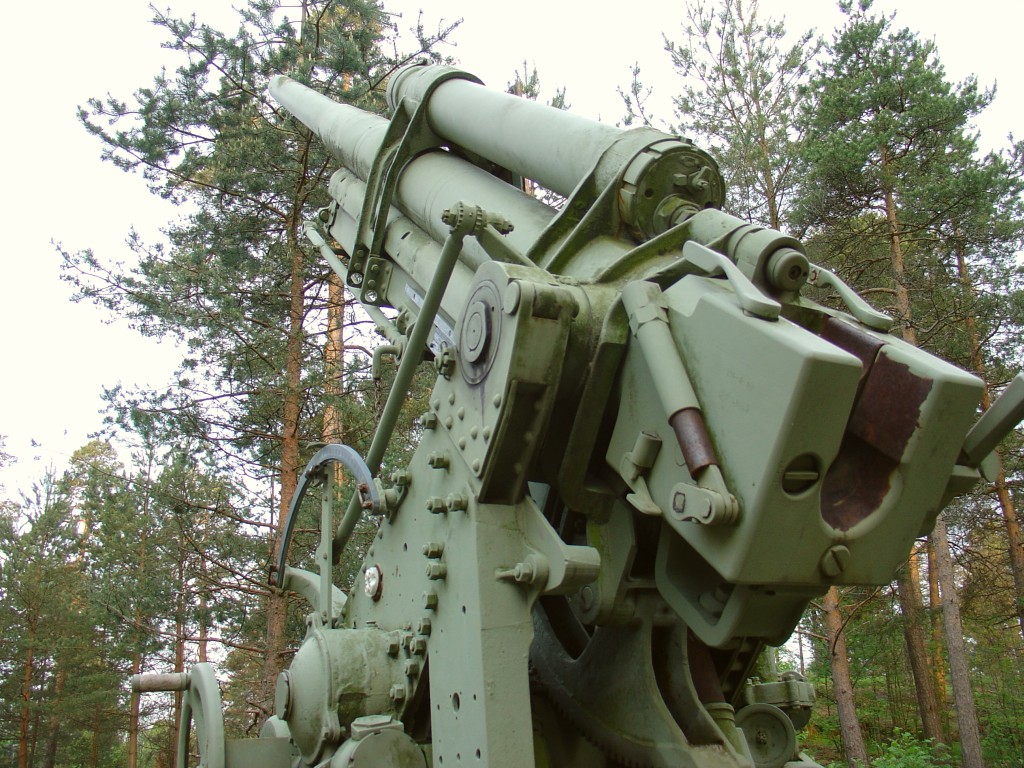

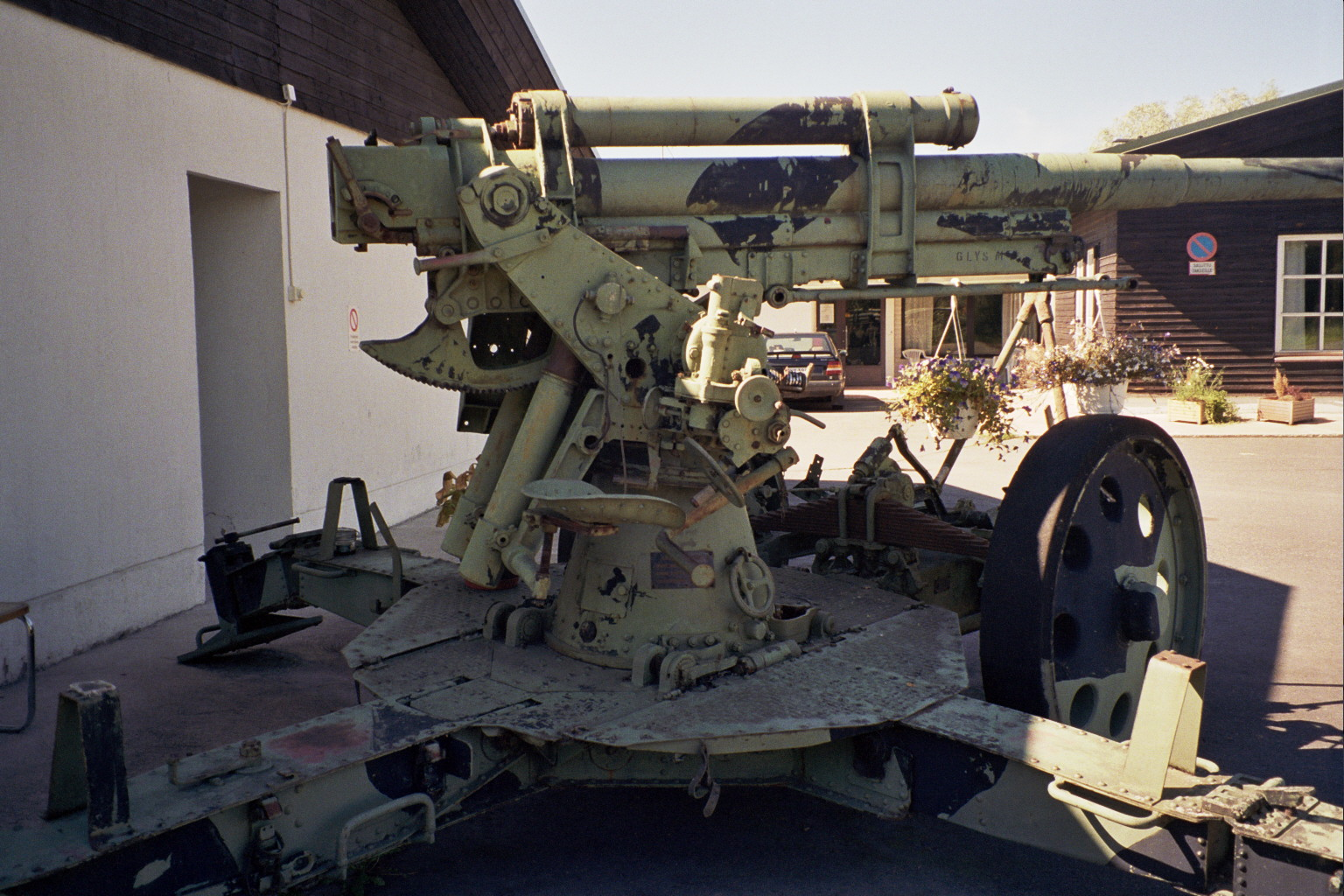

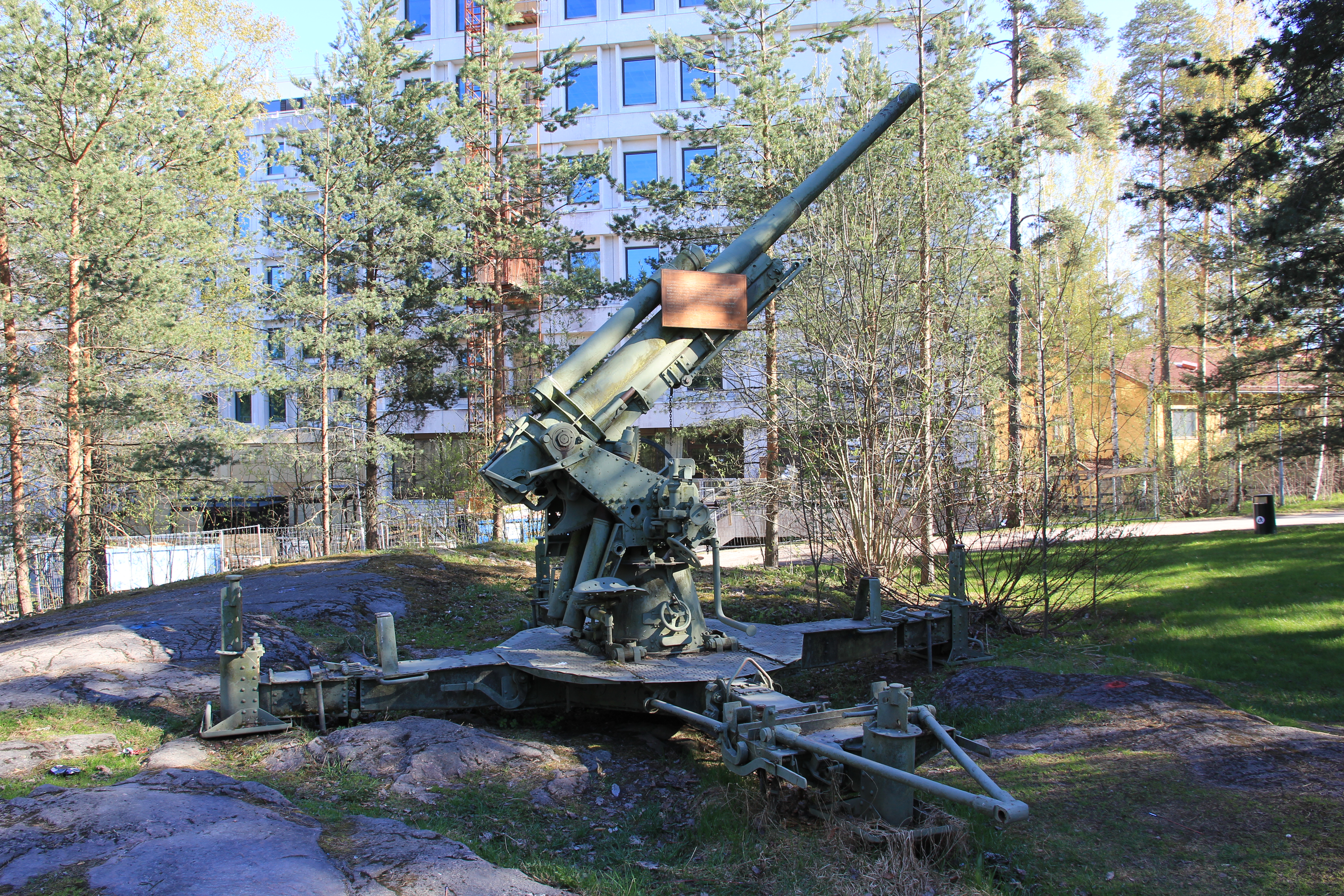

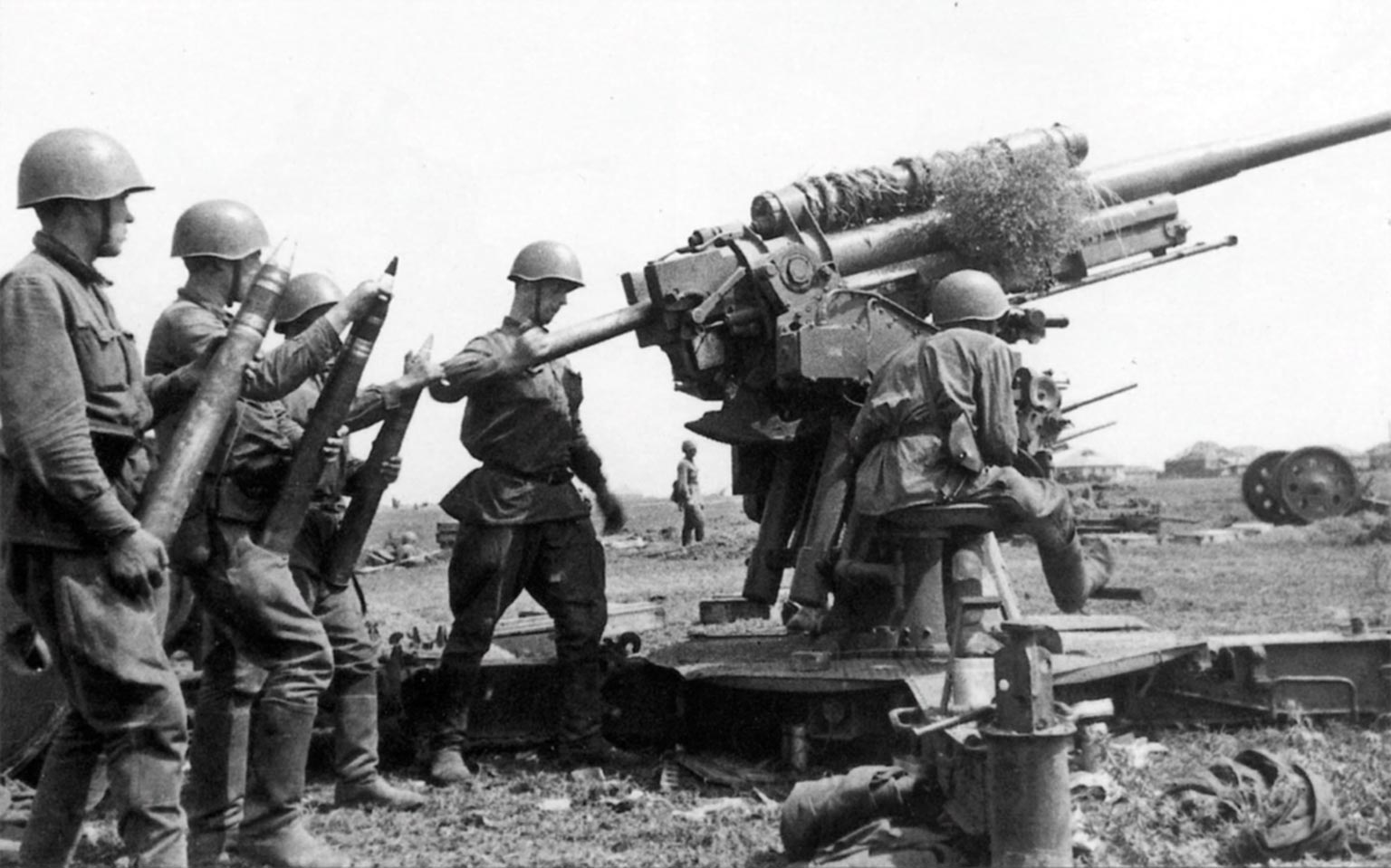
AA guns of the 268th Separate Anti-Aircraft Artillery Battalion during the defense of Nikolayev, August 1941

== See also ==
- ZSU 29-K — The M1931 gun fitted onto the chassis of the three-axle YaG-10 truck.
- SU-6 — Self-propelled gun based on the T-26 tank, armed with the M1931 gun.
