= KrAZ-255 =

KrAZ-255B
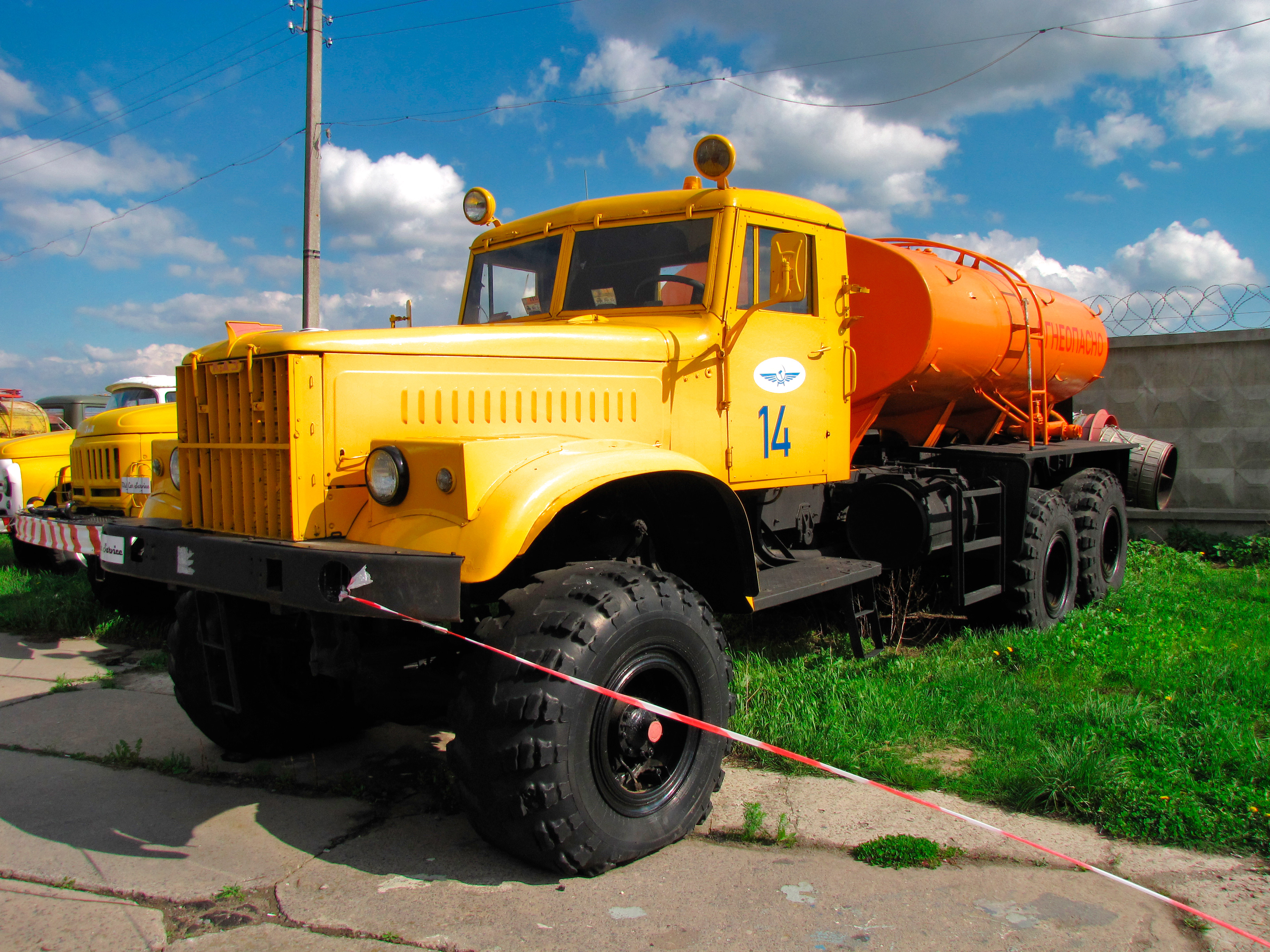

Overview
- Manufacturer: KrAZ
- Production: 1967–1994

Body and chassis
- Class: Truck

Powertrain
- Engine: 14.9L YaMZ-238 V8 diesel
- Transmission: 5-speed YaMZ-236N manual

Dimensions
- Wheelbase: 5,300 mm (17 ft 5 in)
- Length: 8,645 mm (28 ft 4.4 in)
- Width: 2,750 mm (9 ft 0 in)
- Height: 2,940 mm (9 ft 8 in)
- Curb weight: 11,950 kg (26,350 lb)

Chronology
- Predecessor: KrAZ-214
- Successor: KrAZ-260

The KrAZ-255 is a Soviet three-axle off-road truck with six-wheel drive (6 × 6), intended for extreme operations. It was manufactured at the KrAZ plant beginning from 1967.

The KrAZ-255 was developed directly from its predecessor, the KrAZ-214 (produced 1956-1967). Despite being very similar at first glance (both using the same cab, flatbed as well as the suspension), there are few major differences. Firstly, the KrAZ-255 used new and much more powerful engine - the YaMZ-238 (same used in MT-LB tracked APC), replacing the previously used and sensibly weaker YaAZ-206B which was used in KrAZ-214. The KrAZ-255 also featured new and more reliable transmission, the YaMZ-236N, instead of the previously used YaAZ-204. It also featured new headlights (which were now, together with turn signals, located in their own housings mounted on the fenders) and, most notably, much wider tires (1300 x 530 x 533 in dimensions), which offered lighter ground pressure and thus, even greater off-road capabilities when compared to its predecessor.

Along with Ural, ZiL, Kamaz, GAZ and MAZ, the KrAZ once represented one of six models of cargo/towing trucks (in its basic version, the KrAZ-255B) used by the Soviet Armed Forces, as well as by many civilian organizations in the former Soviet Union (mainly by various construction plants), where it was also used as a logging truck (KrAZ-255L/L1).

Since the KrAZ-255 was the heaviest (weighing 12 tons empty) and most powerful (using a 14,900 ccm engine, producing 240 hp/180 kw) of all Soviet three-axle (6 × 6) military cargo trucks, it was most often used for towing heavier artillery pieces (such as D-74, M-46 and 2A65 howitzers or T-12 anti-tank gun) and also for towing various aircraft from their hangars to runways, or vice versa (in tractor-unit version, the KrAZ-255V).

Furthermore, it was also used as a platform for control cabin and the antennas of PRV-9/1RL19 Naklon (NATO reporting name: "Thin-Skin") and PRV-16/1RL132 Nadyozhnost (NATO reporting name: "Odd-Pair") Soviet height-finding radars, as well as for various engineer duties in specially-designed versions (such as PMP collapsible ferryboat intended to be used as a pontoon bridge and TMM-3 mobile bridgelayer), which are still being used today by various military forces across the globe.

The KrAZ-255 ultimately evolved into a new model as its successor in 1979, the KrAZ-260, whose only difference was a new design of cab and the interiors. Despite that however, the KrAZ-260 did not replace it in production, but was actually produced alongside it up until 1994, when both were finally discontinued in favour to KrAZ-6322 (a modernized model of KrAZ-260).

== Technical characteristics ==
- Engine: 14.86 L diesel 8 cyl.
- Power: 240 PS /2100 rpm
- Torque: 883 Nm /1500 rpm
- Top speed: 71 km/h (44 mph)

== Variants ==
- KrAZ-255B (КрАЗ-255Б) - 12-ton cargo truck Mass production started since 8 August 1967

- KrAZ-255B1 (КрАЗ-255Б1) - cargo truck, mass production started since 1979

- KrAZ-255V (КрАЗ-255В) - tractor unit
- KrAZ-255L (КрАЗ-255Л) - 23-ton log truck

- KrAZ-255L1 (КрАЗ-255Л1) - log truck, mass production started since 1980

- ATZ-8,5 (АТЗ-8,5) - fuel tanker on KrAZ-255 chassis
- КS-3572 (КС-3572) - military crane on KrAZ-255 chassis
- EOV-4421 (ЭОВ-4421) - military excavator on KrAZ-255 chassis
- ТММ-3 (Tyazhyolyy Mekhanizirovannyy Most) - bridgelayer on KrAZ-255 chassis, since 1974
- PMP (Pontonno-Mostovoy Park) - pontoon bridge on KrAZ-255 chassis
- PRV-9 and PRV-16 (Podvizhnyy Radiolokatsionnyy Vysotomer) - height-finding radars on KrAZ-255 chassis.
- 122mm BM-21 Grad on KrAZ-255 chassis - several vehicles were made in Tajikistan
- Jupiter - 130mm self-propelled gun (a Soviet 130mm field gun M-46 on KrAZ-255B chassis), several vehicles were made in Cuba
- PTH130-K255B - 130mm self-propelled gun (a Soviet 130mm field gun M-46 on KrAZ-255B chassis). One test prototype was made in Vietnam

== Operators ==
=== Current operators ===
- Belarus - Armed Forces of Belarus
- Bulgaria
- Cuba - Cuban Revolutionary Armed Forces
- Egypt
- Georgia
- Hungary - Hungarian Armed Forces
- India – Used by the Indian Army for towing 130 mm M-46 guns.
- Iran
- Kazakhstan - In April 2016, it was announced that Armed Forces of the Republic of Kazakhstan would begin replacing KrAZ-255B trucks with new KamAZ trucks
- Laos - Lao People's Armed Forces
- Lebanon
- Moldova - Armed Forces of the Republic of Moldova
- North Korea
- Poland
- Romania - 4 were allocated to the Bucharest public transport company in 1978 serving as recovery vehicles for buses, trams and trolleybuses, where they remained in service until 2007, when one was cut and disposed and the other 3 retired
- Russia - Russian Armed Forces
- Serbia - Serbian Armed Forces
- Syria - Syrian Armed Forces
- Tajikistan - Armed Forces of the Republic of Tajikistan
- Ukraine - Ukrainian Armed Forces
- Vietnam

=== Former operators ===
- East Germany
- Estonia
- Finland: Finnish Army
- Soviet Union

== Gallery ==
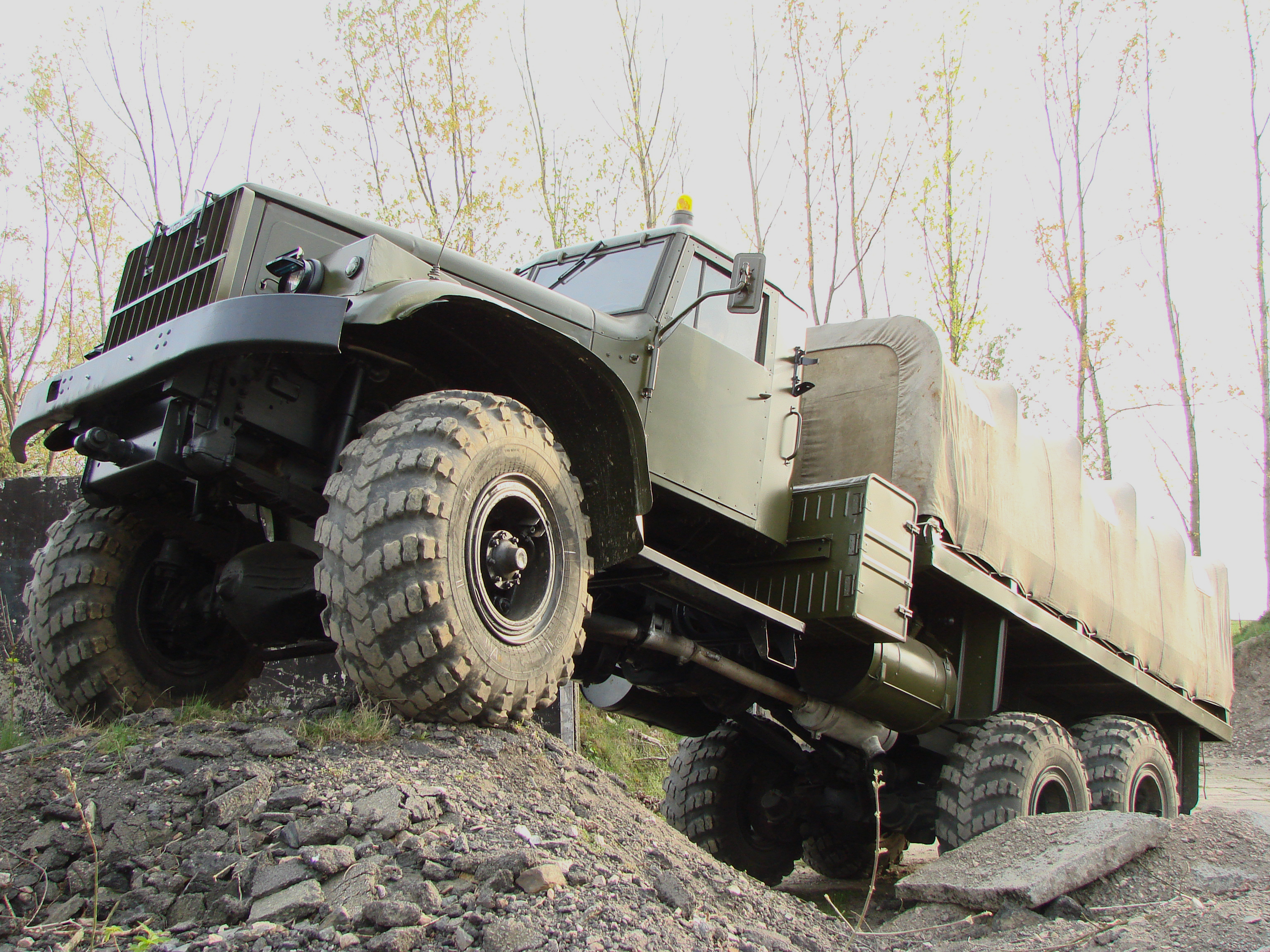
KrAZ-255B

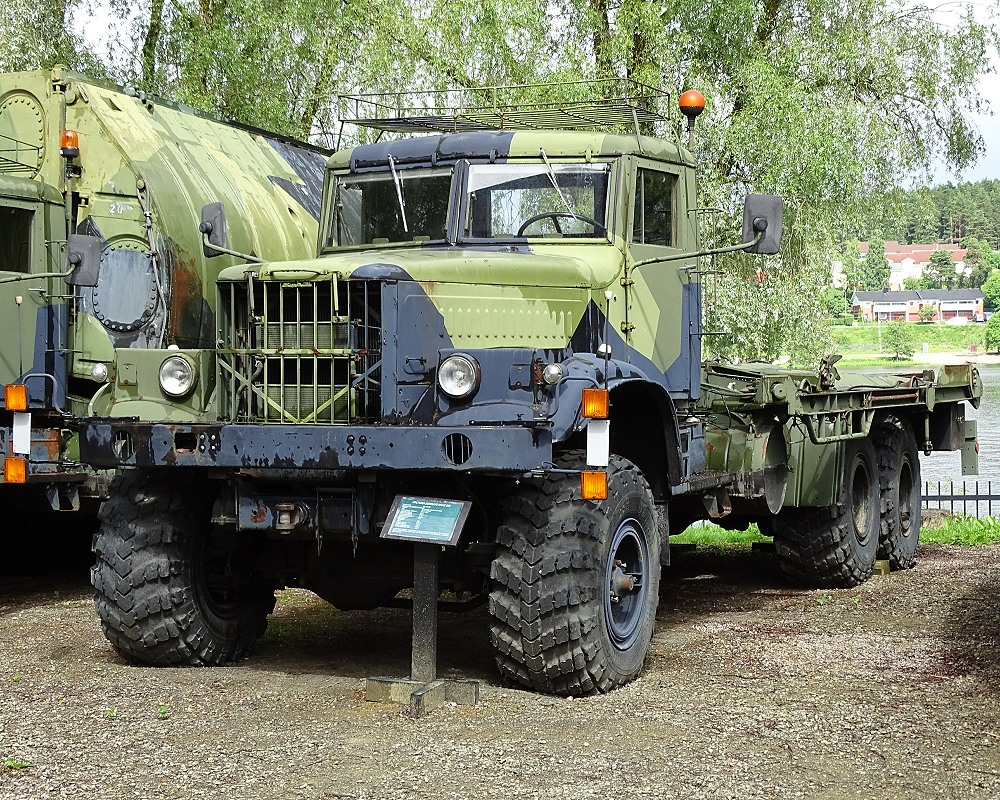
KrAZ-255 platform for PMP pontoon-bridge, Finland

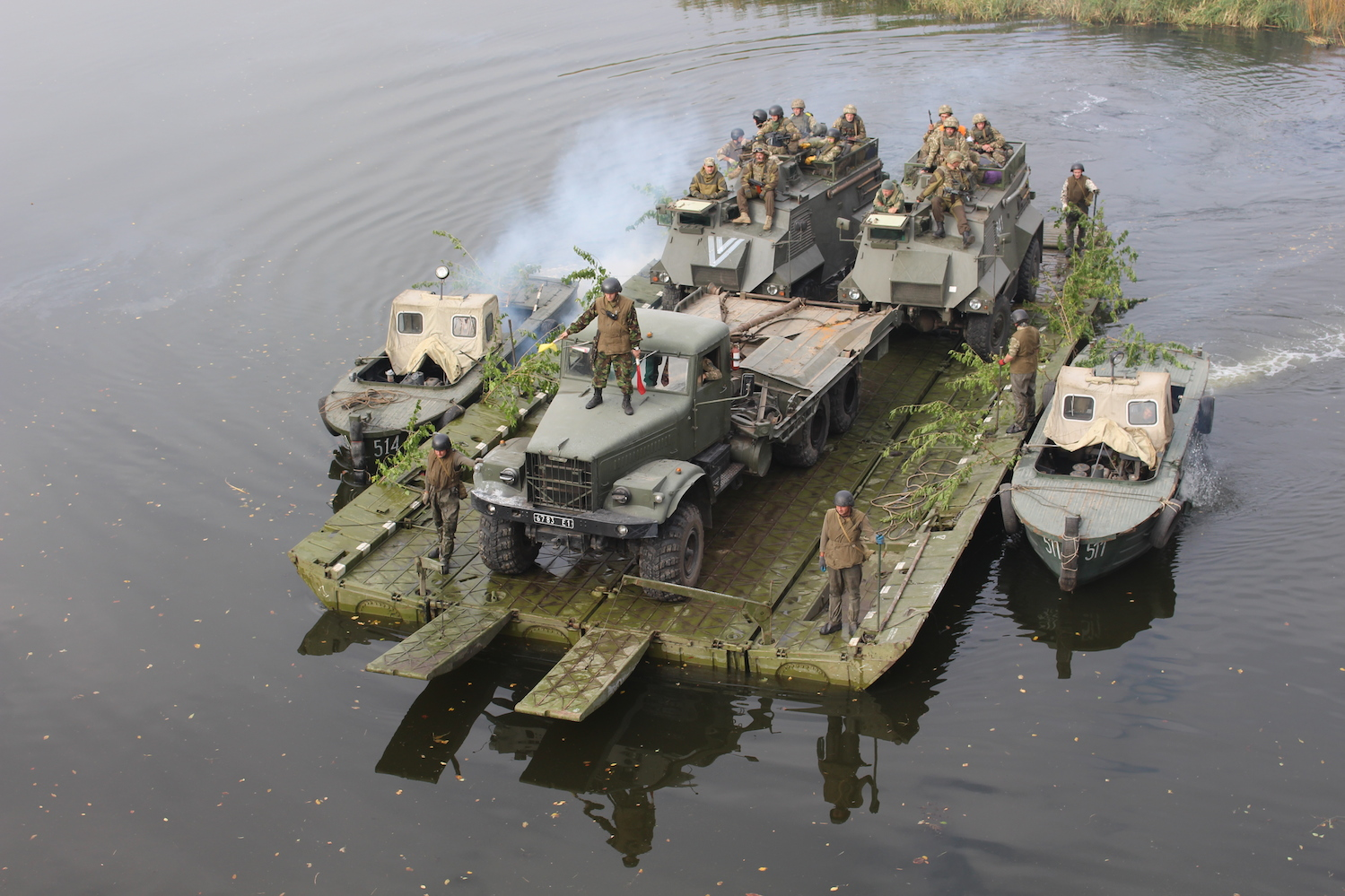
KrAZ-255 ferrying on its own PMP pontoon-bridge, Ukraine

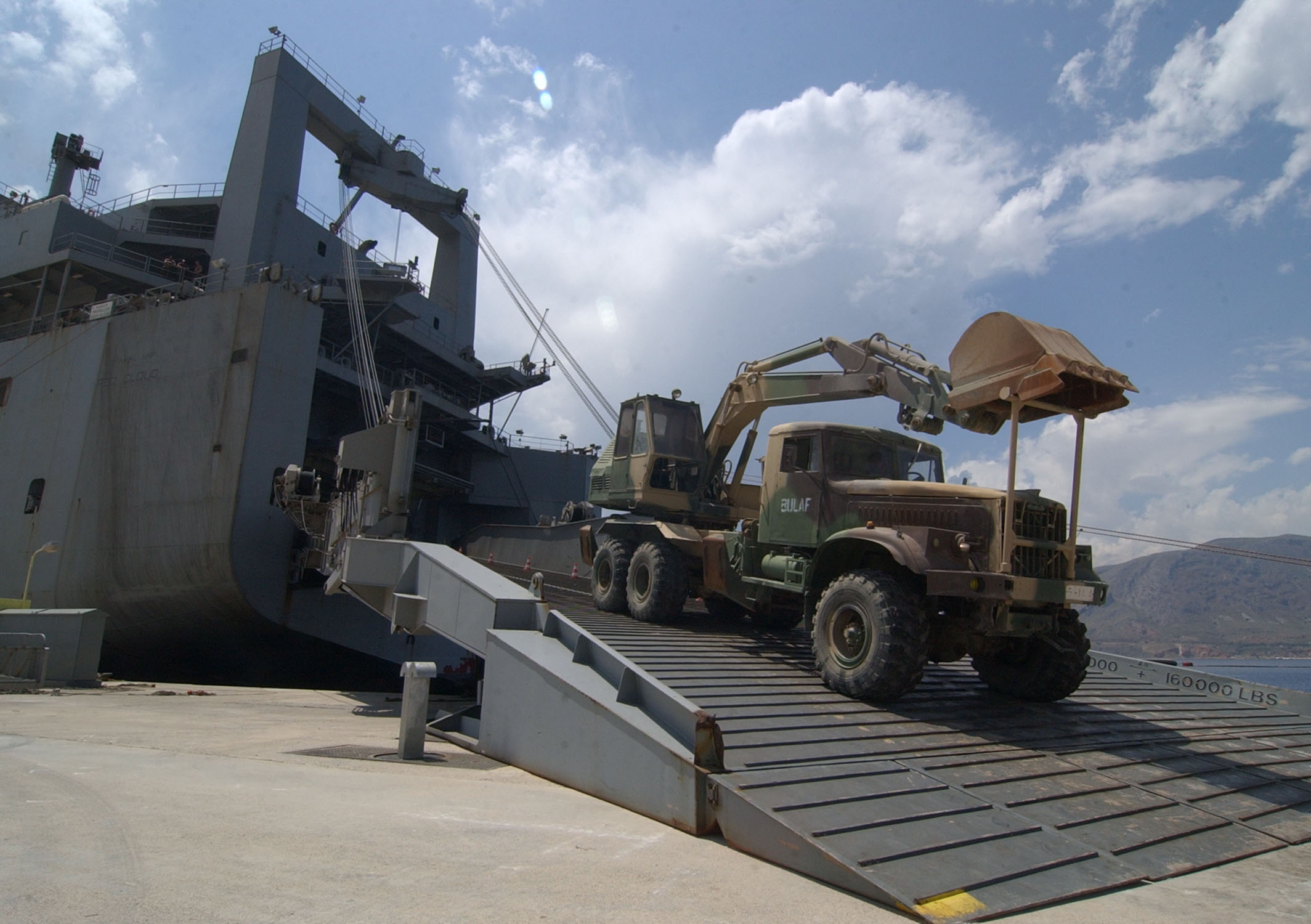
EOV-4421, Bulgaria

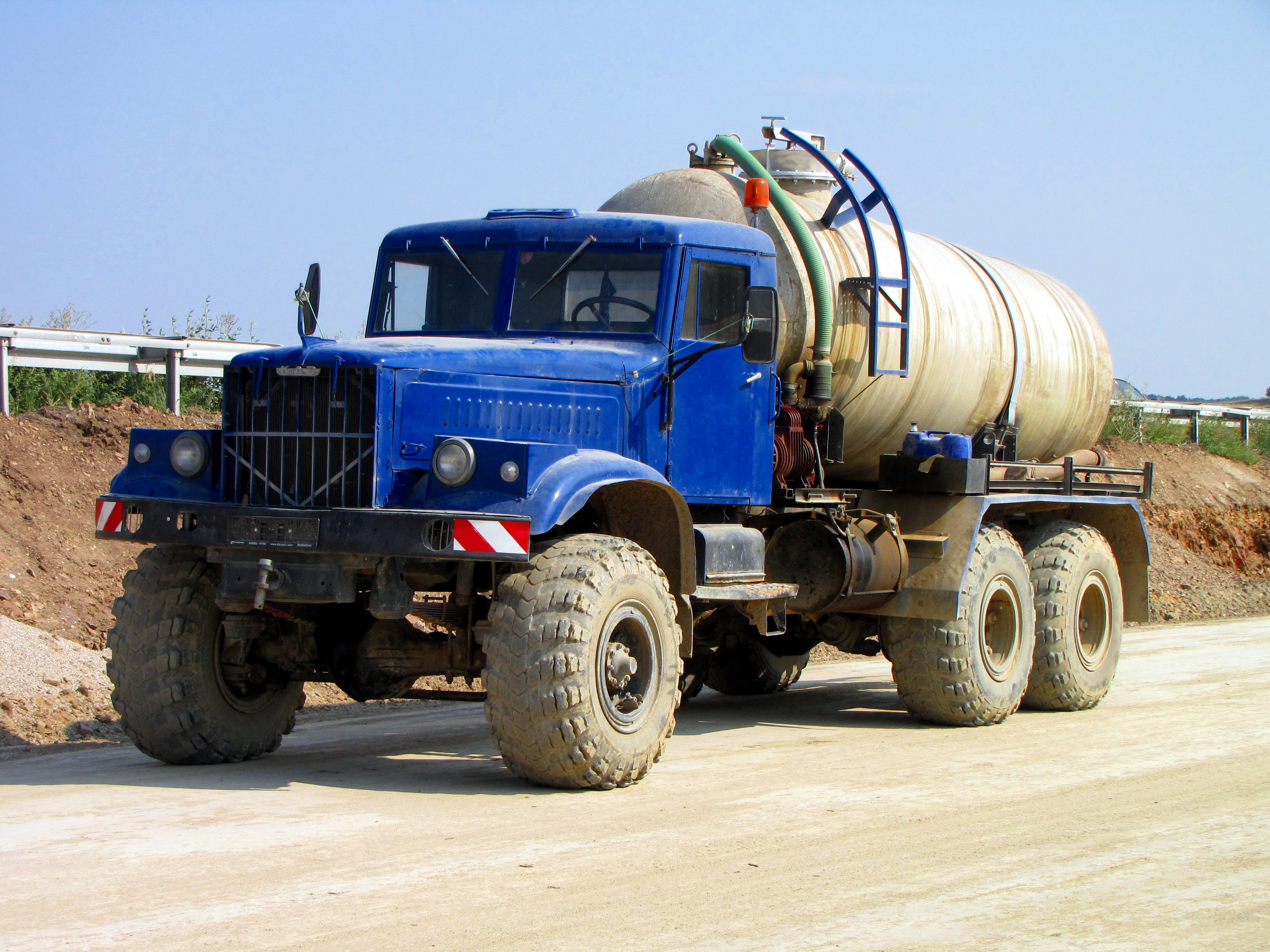
KrAZ-255B, Germany

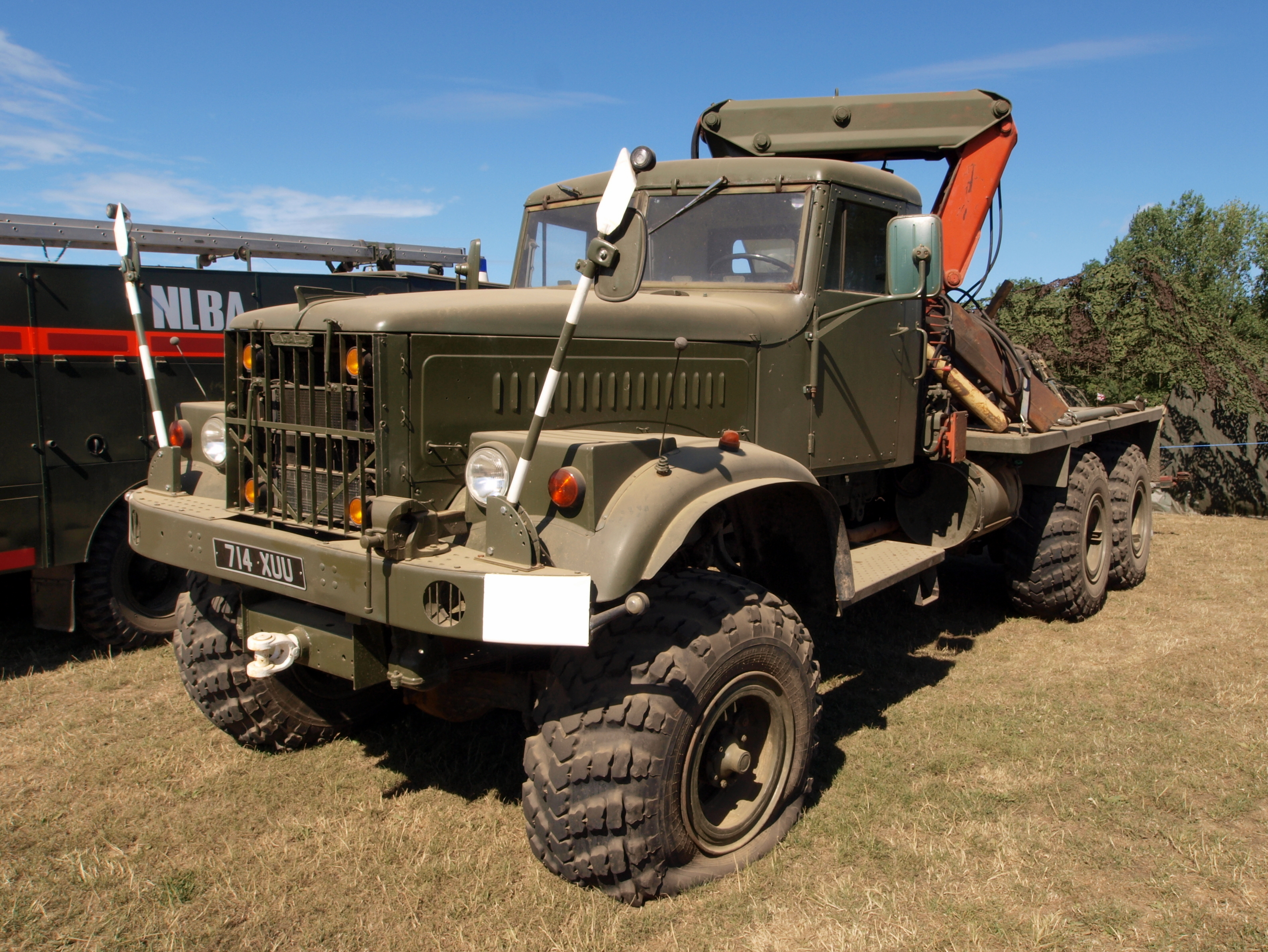
KrAZ-255B on the "War and Peace Show", United Kingdom

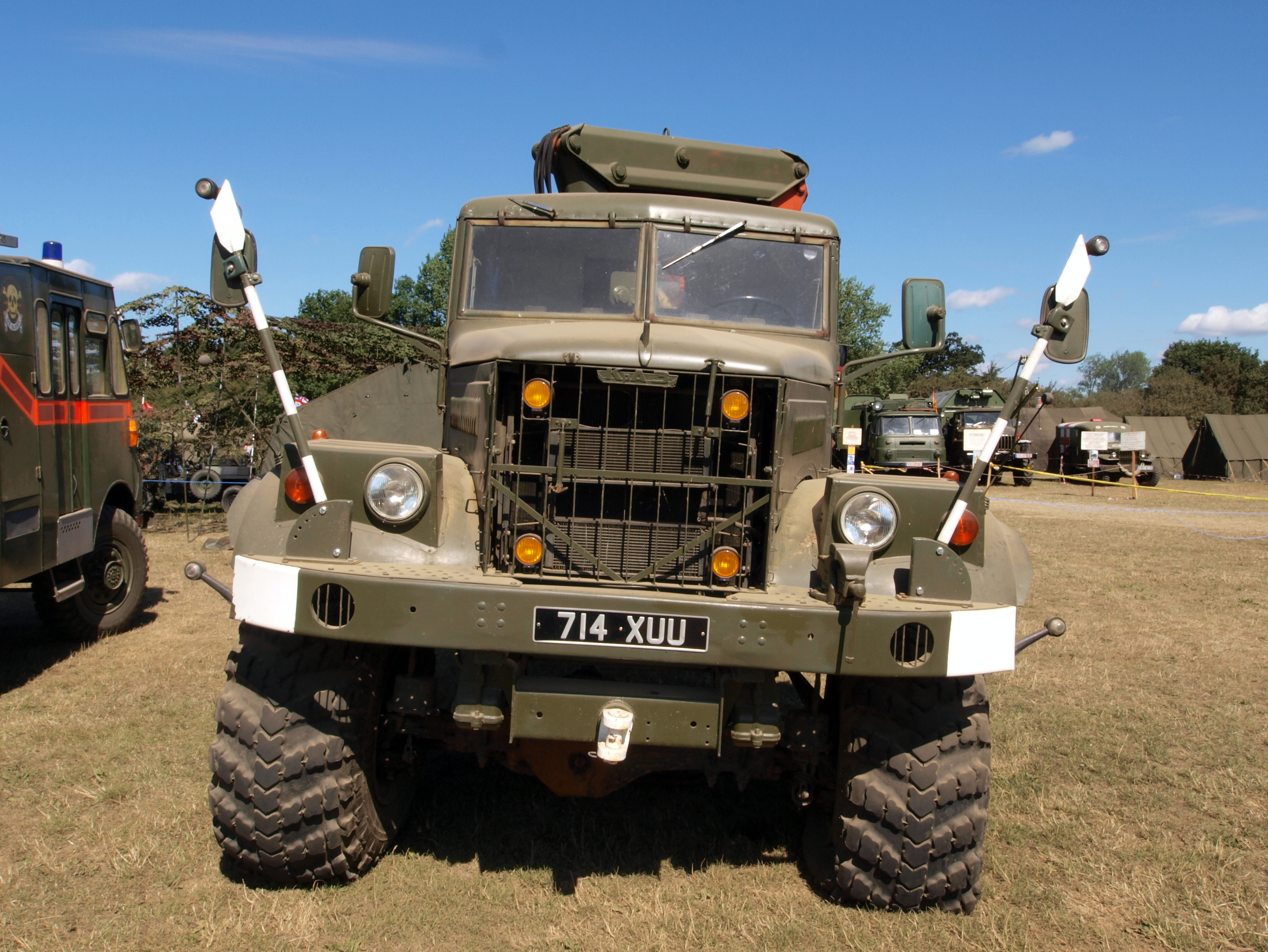
KrAZ-255B on the "War and Peace Show", United Kingdom

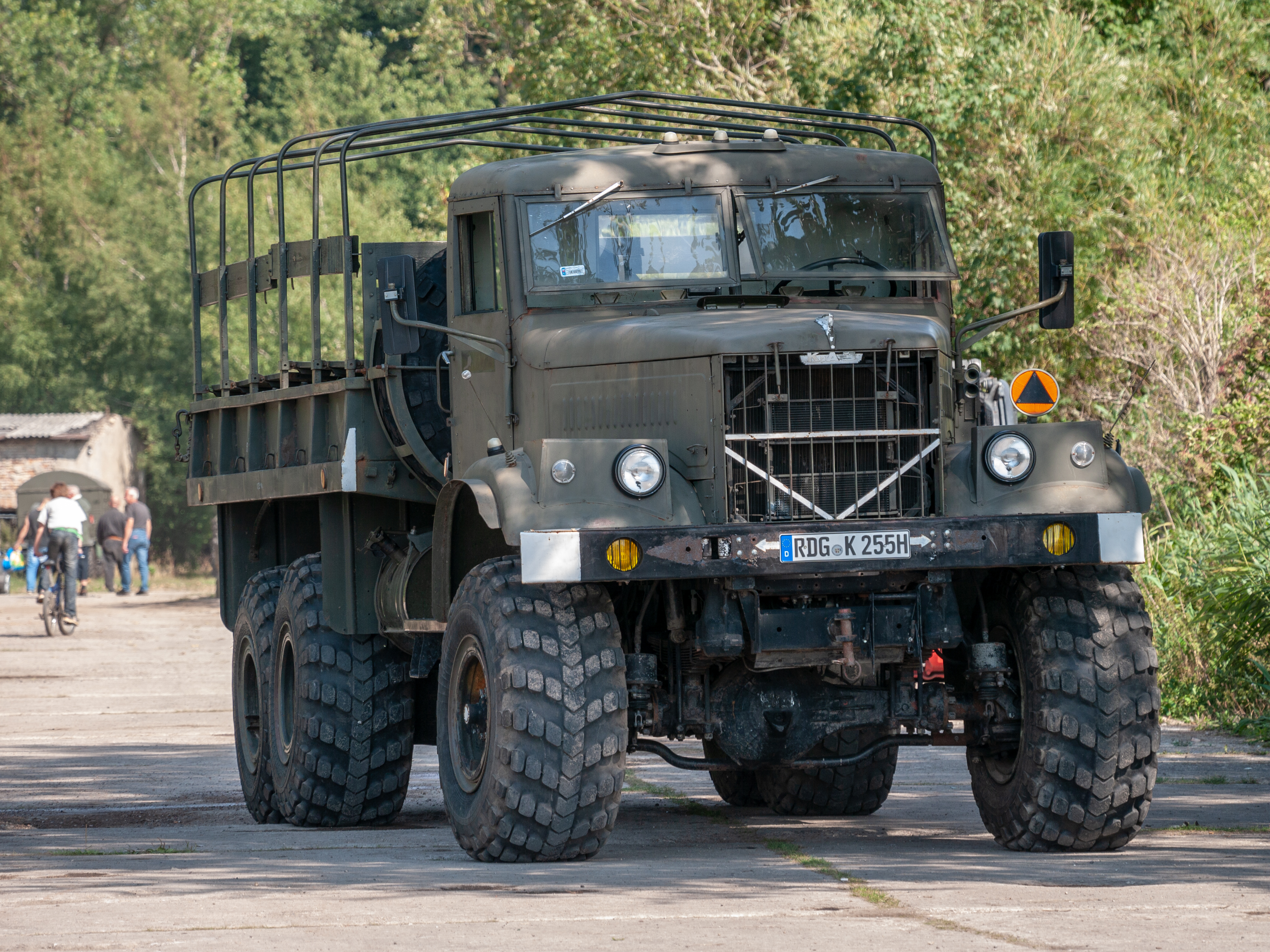
KrAZ-255B, Germany

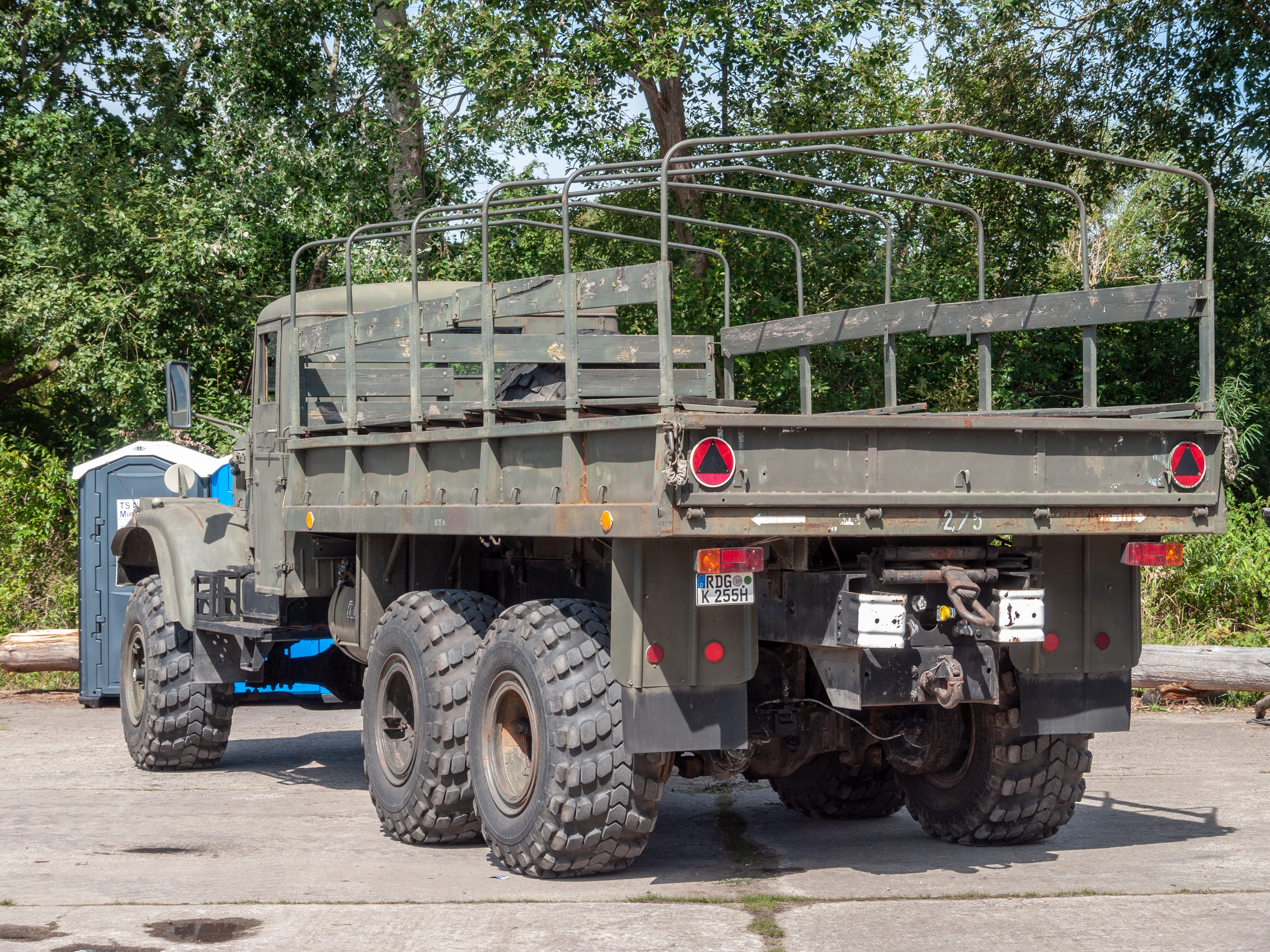
KrAZ-255B, Germany

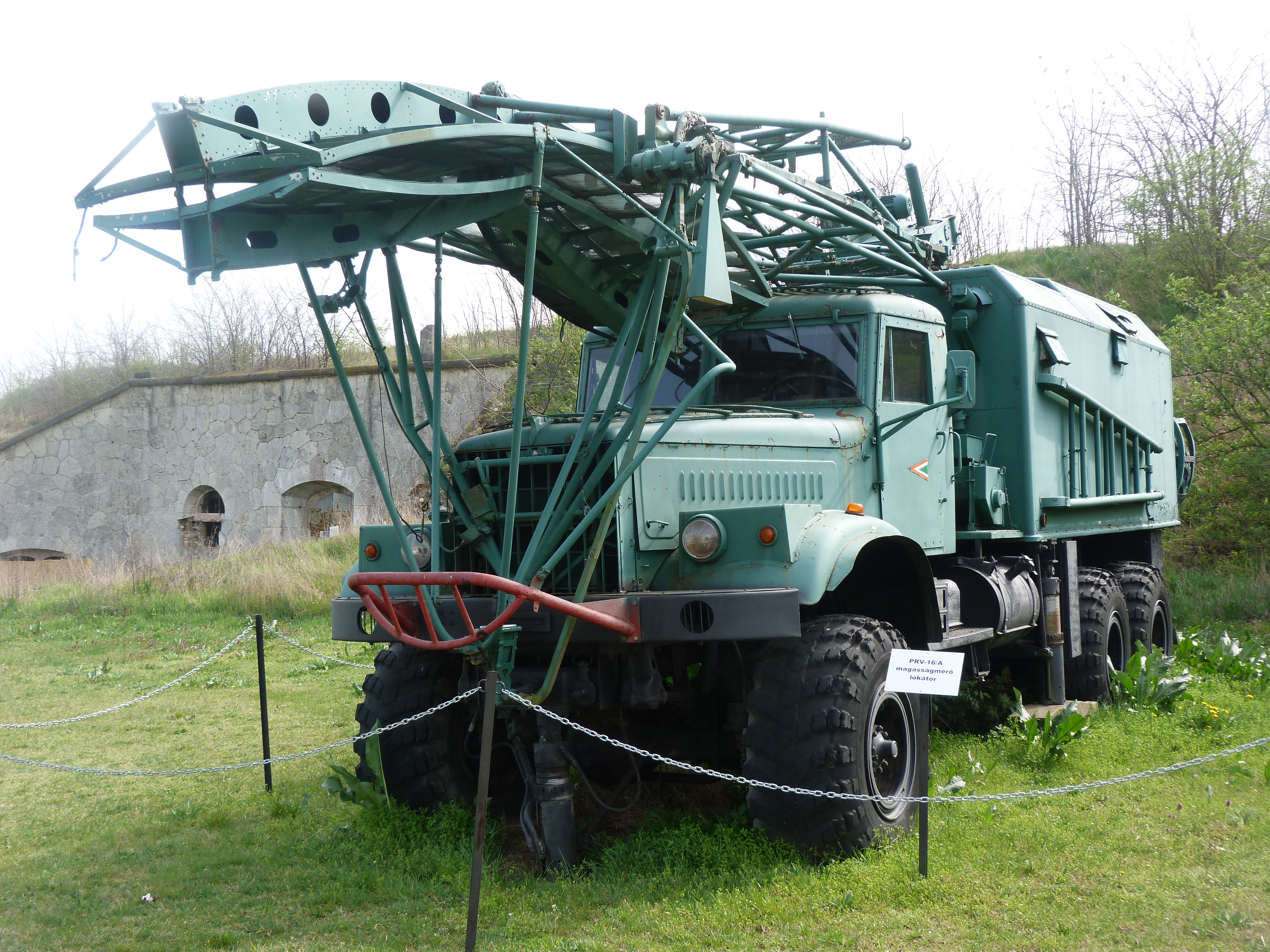
PRV-16/1RL132 height-finding radar on KrAZ-255 in folded/transport configuration, Hungary

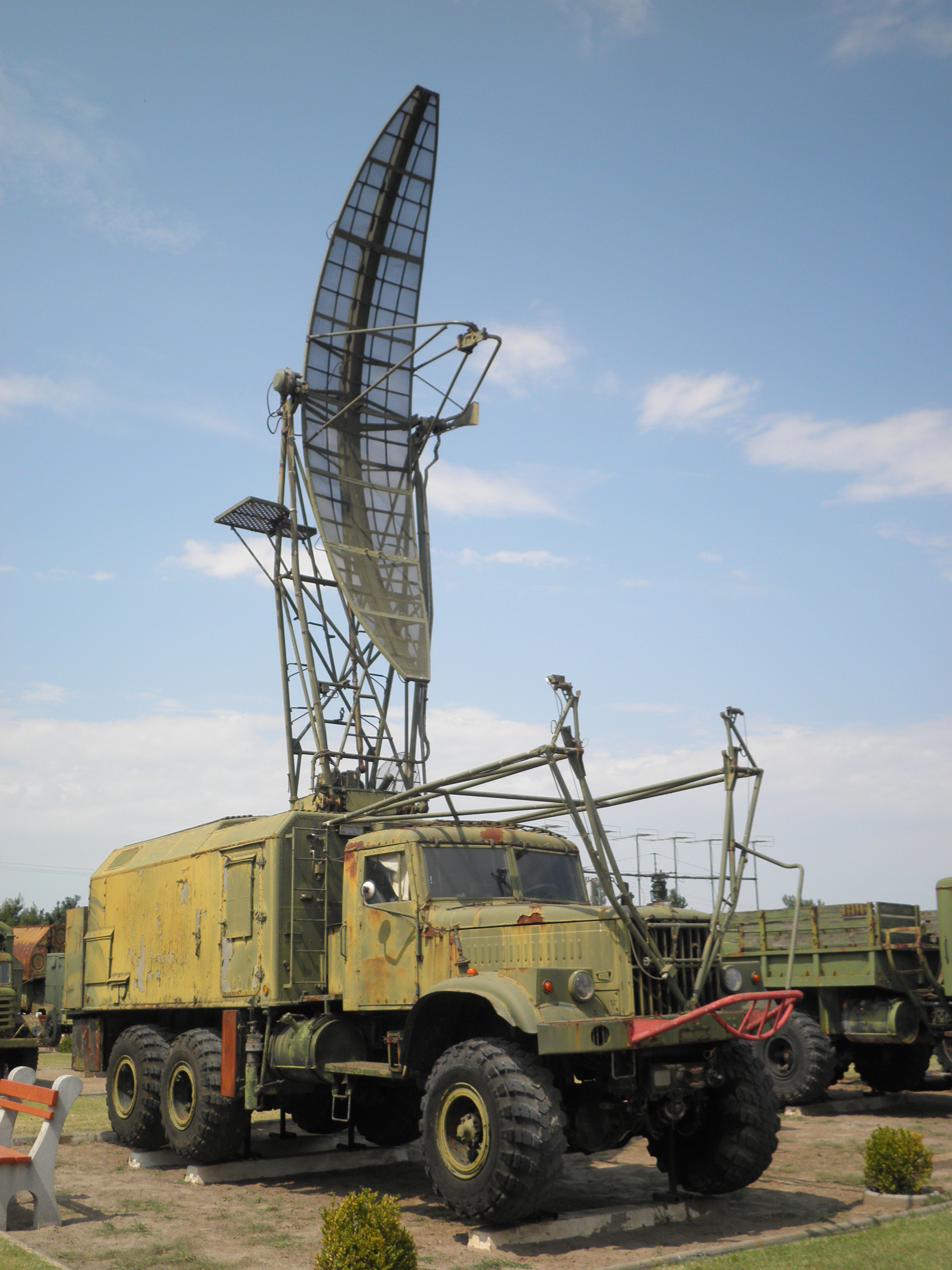
PRV-16/1RL132 height-finding radar on KrAZ-255 in raised/working configuration, Hungary

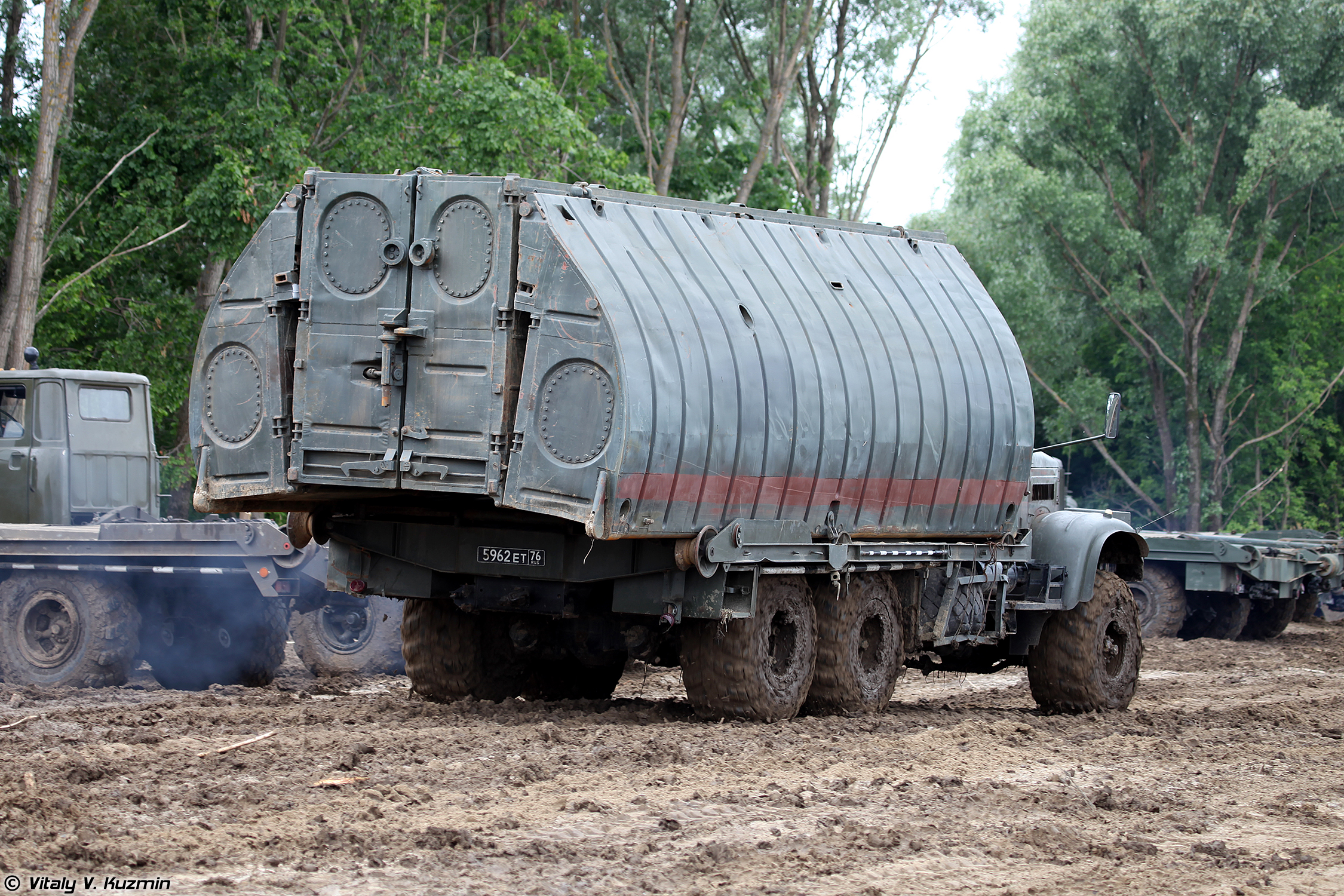
PMP pontoon bridge on KrAZ-255, Russia

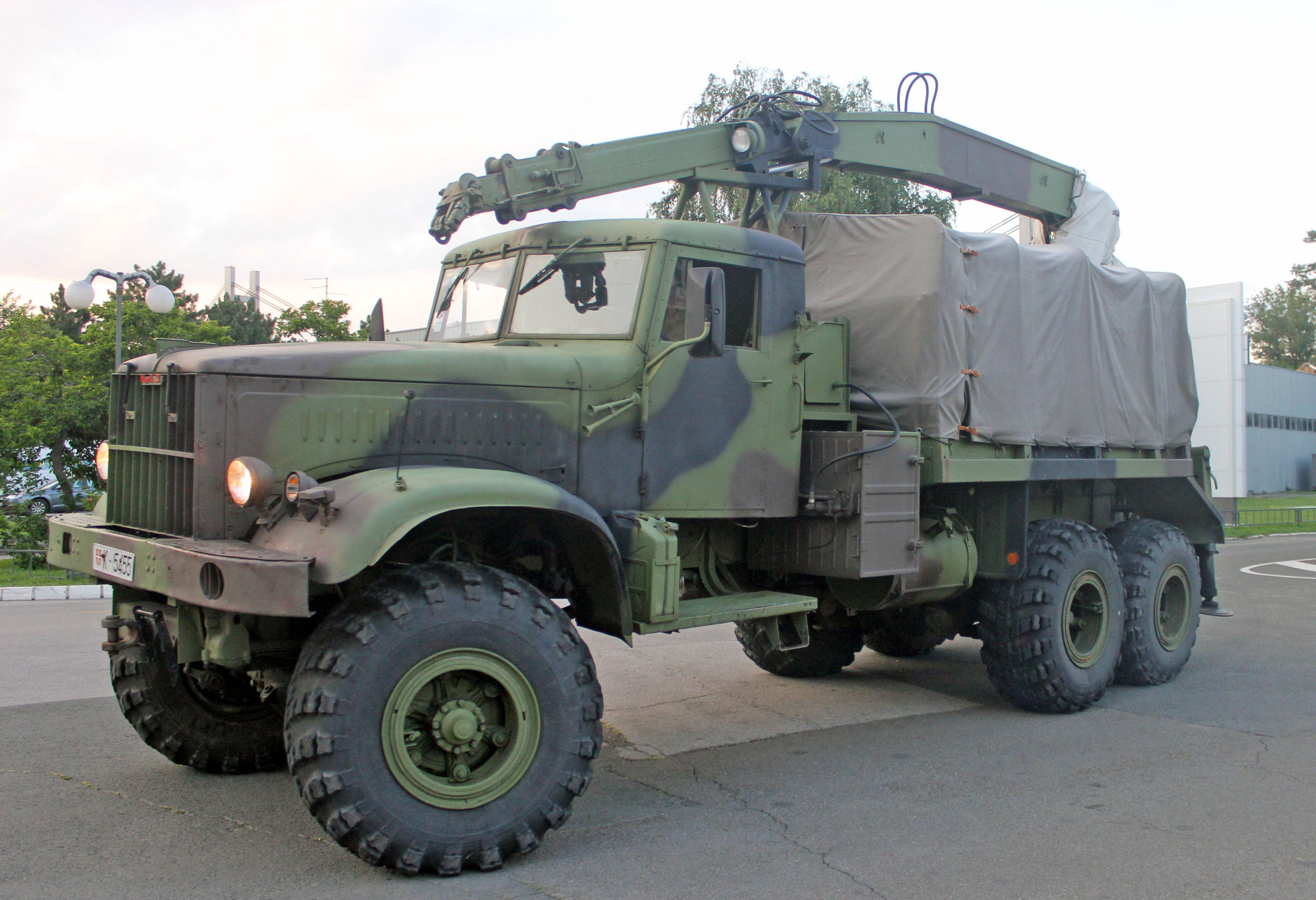
KrAZ-255B, Serbia

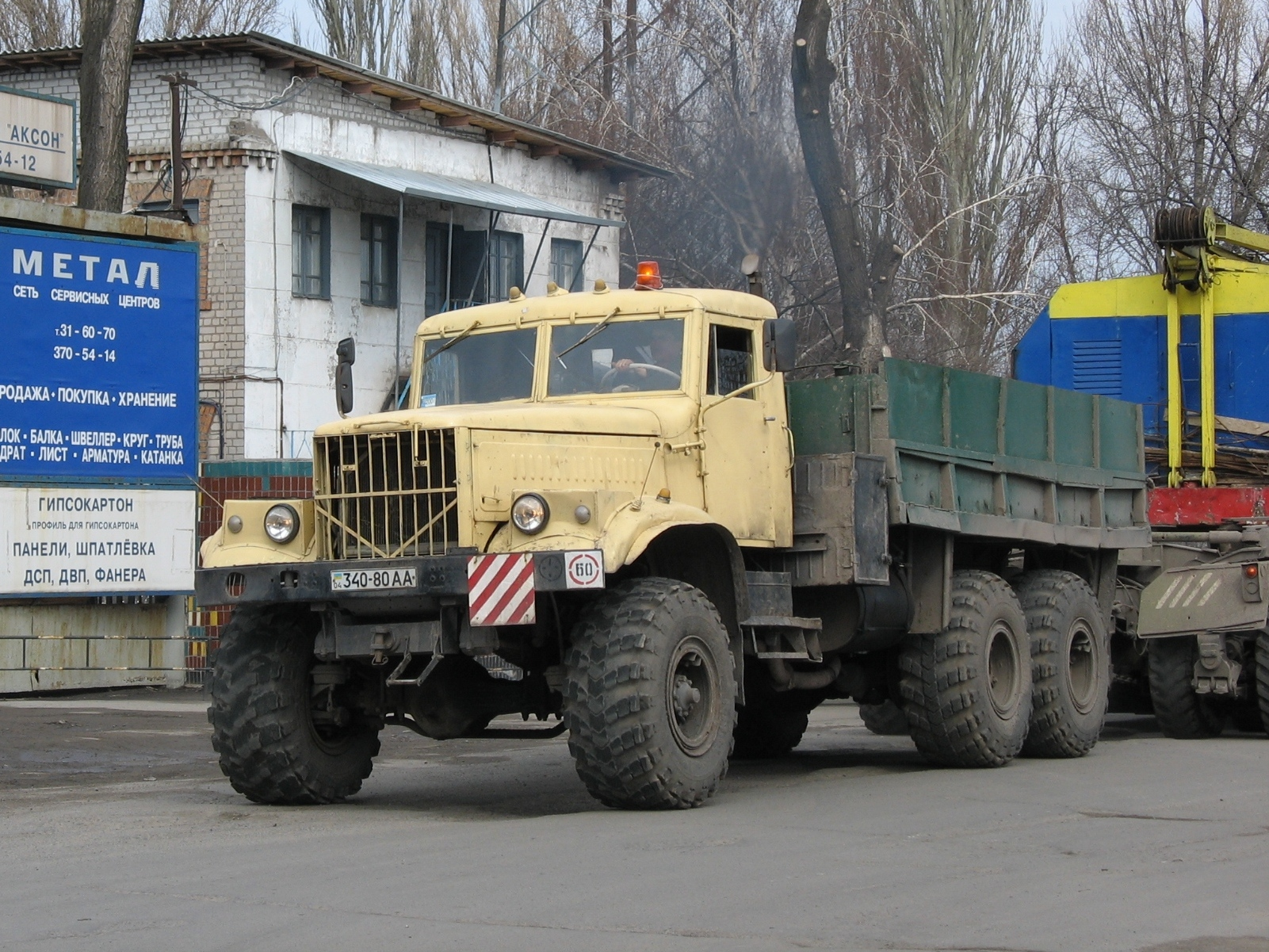
KrAZ-255B, Ukraine

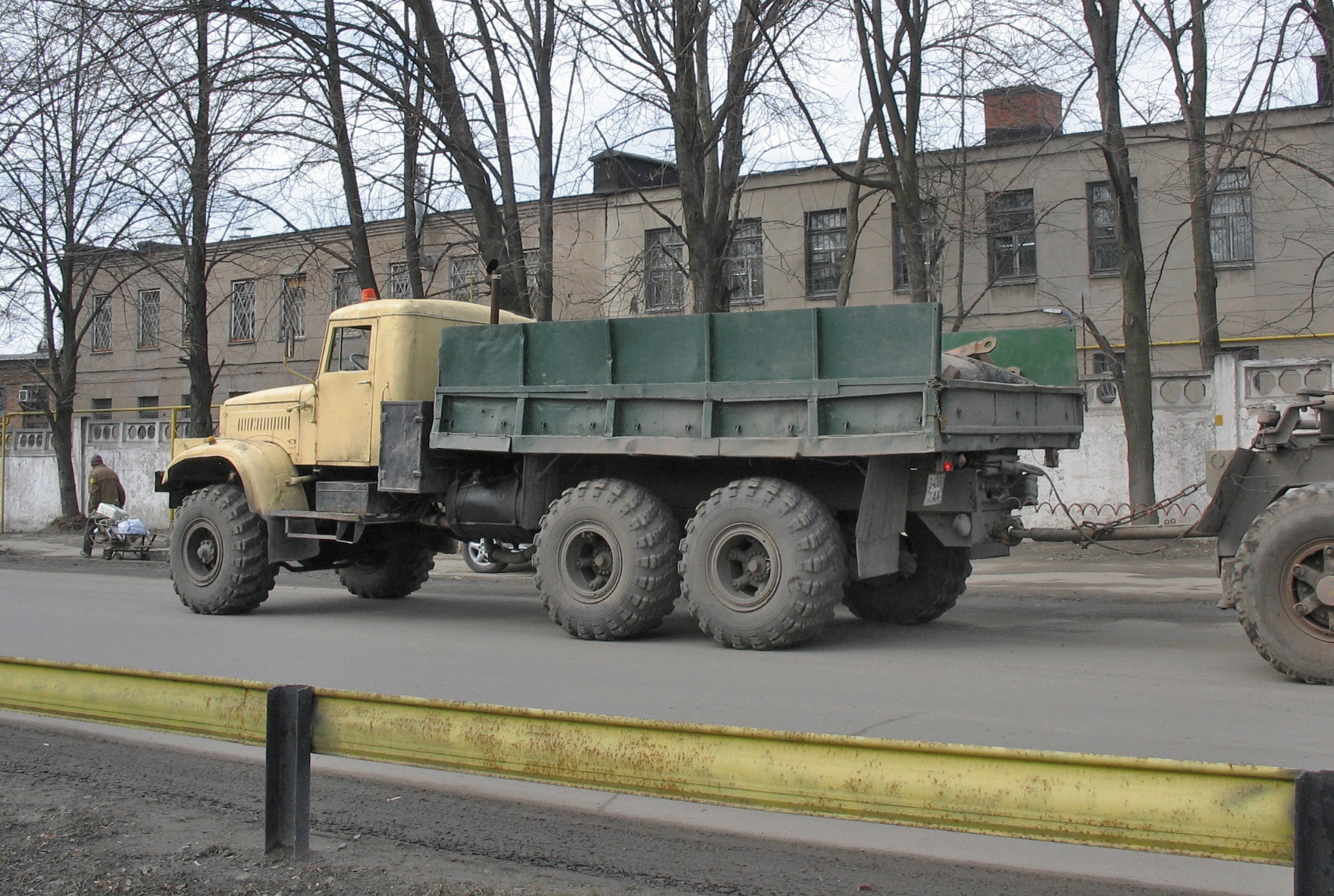
KrAZ-255B1, Ukraine

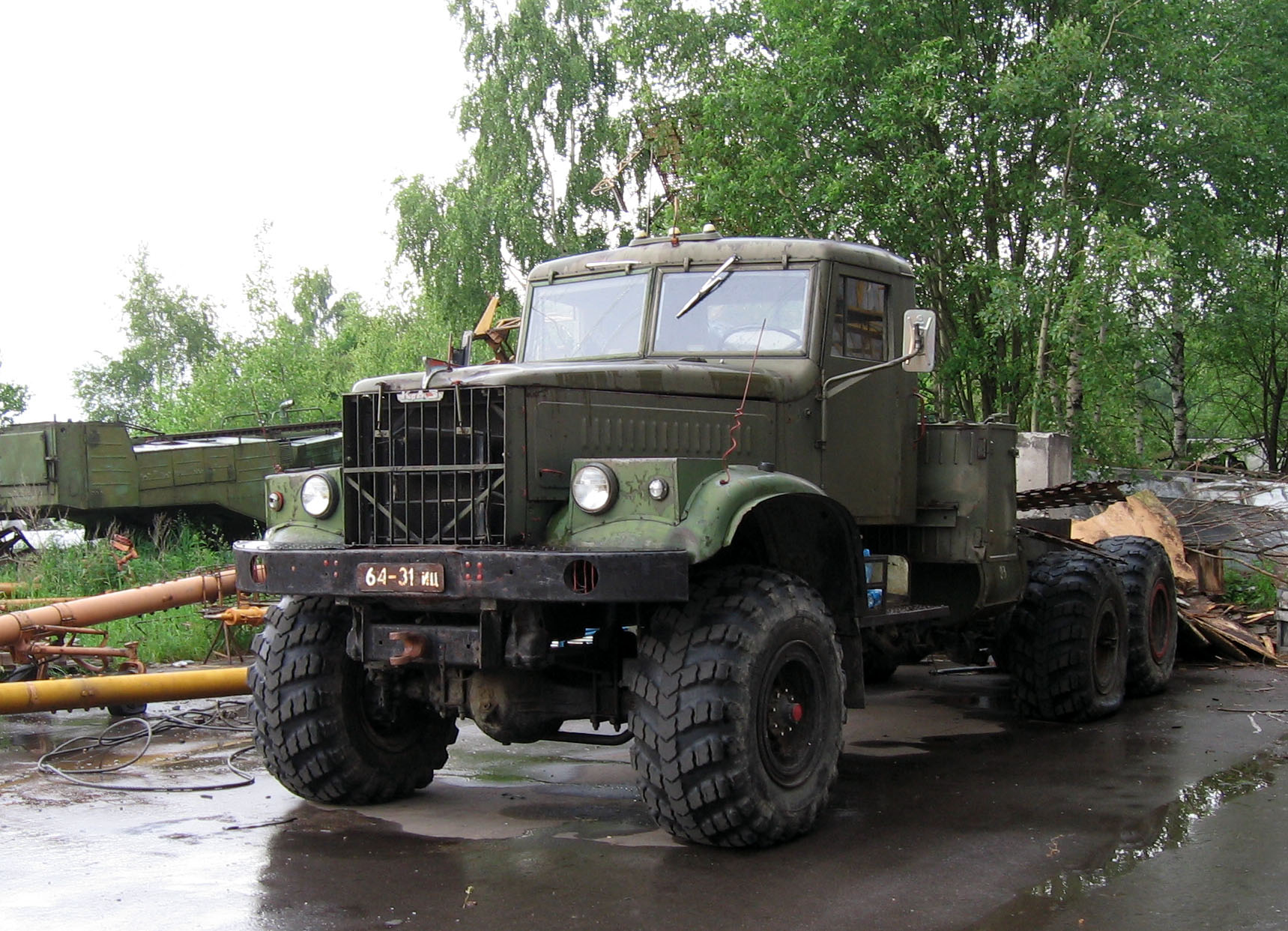
KrAZ-255V tractor
