= PMP Floating Bridge =

Soviet model of mobile pontoon bridge

Automatic unfolding: A PP-2005 improved ribbon bridge is deployed in Stavropol Krai district by Russian engineers of 78th Logistic Support Brigade in 2020.

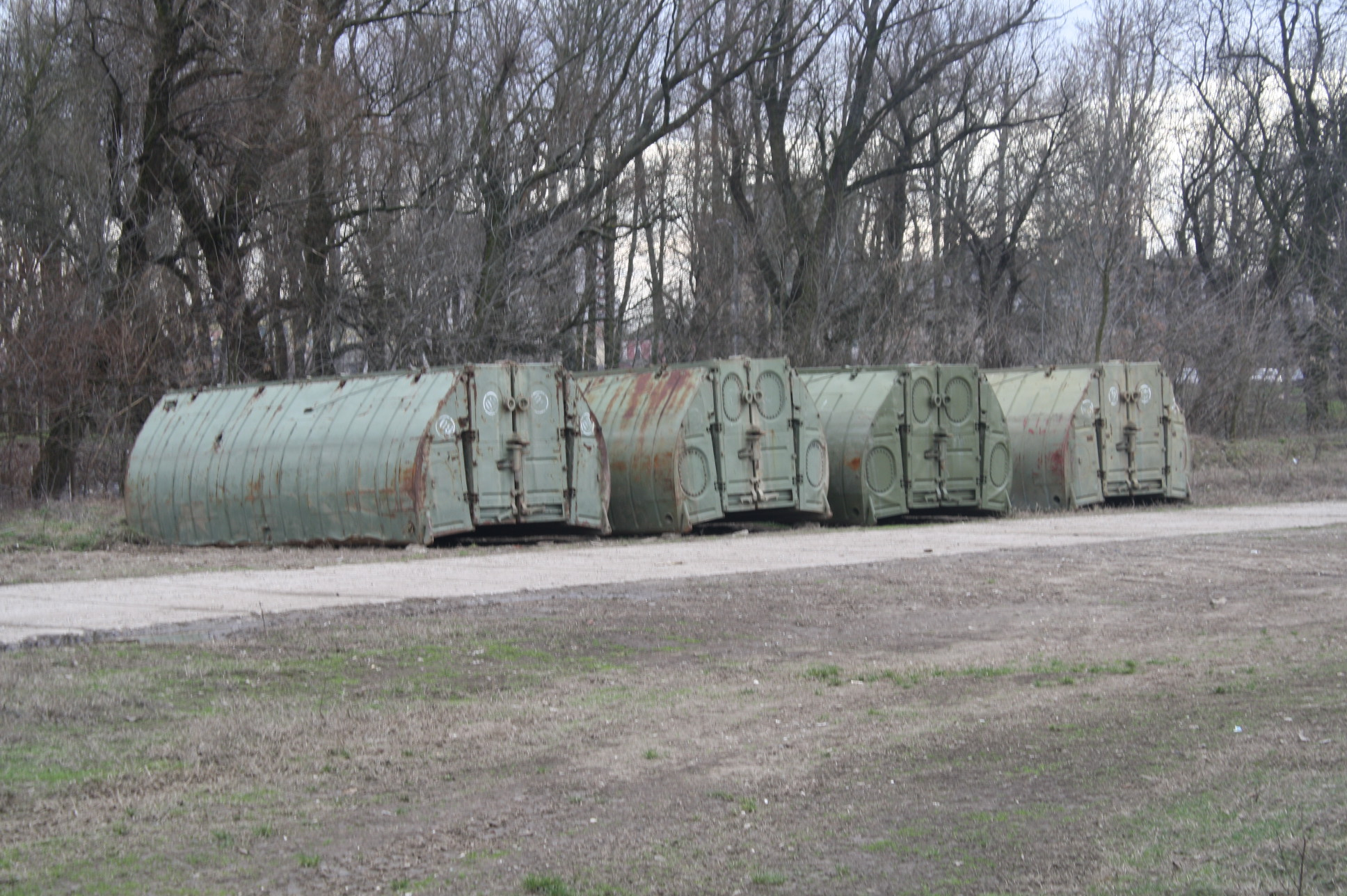
Four pontoon elements

The PMP Floating Bridge (Russian: Понтонно-мостовой парк, ПМП "pontoon / bridge park") is a type of mobile pontoon bridge designed by the Soviet Union after World War II. The bridge's design enables for a quick assembly of its parts. It has a carrying capacity of 60 tons. The bridge was originally mounted on a KrAZ-214, but later transferred to a KrAZ-255. During the process of its deployment, a truck carrying the bridge is backed alongside the edge of a body of water. The bridge is then rolled off where it unfolds automatically. The bridge spans 382 metres, load capacity 20 tons, or 227 m, load capacity 60 tons, with 32 river pontoons, 12 bridging boats and four shore pontoons.

The PMP was superseded by the PPS-84 and later the PP-91 bridge system after the breakup of the Soviet Union. The designation PP stands for "Pontoon Park" and can be assembled into a group of rafts or a bridge spanning up to 879 ft (268 m) with a capacity from 90 to 360 tons. The system employs 15 ton Ural-53236 trucks and BMK-225 bridging boats. The latest variant of the PP-91 system is the PP-2005 which uses KamAZ 63501 trucks and BMK-MT motorboats.

== See also ==
- PP-64 Wstęga
- PM M71 Floating Bridge
