= MAZ-200 =

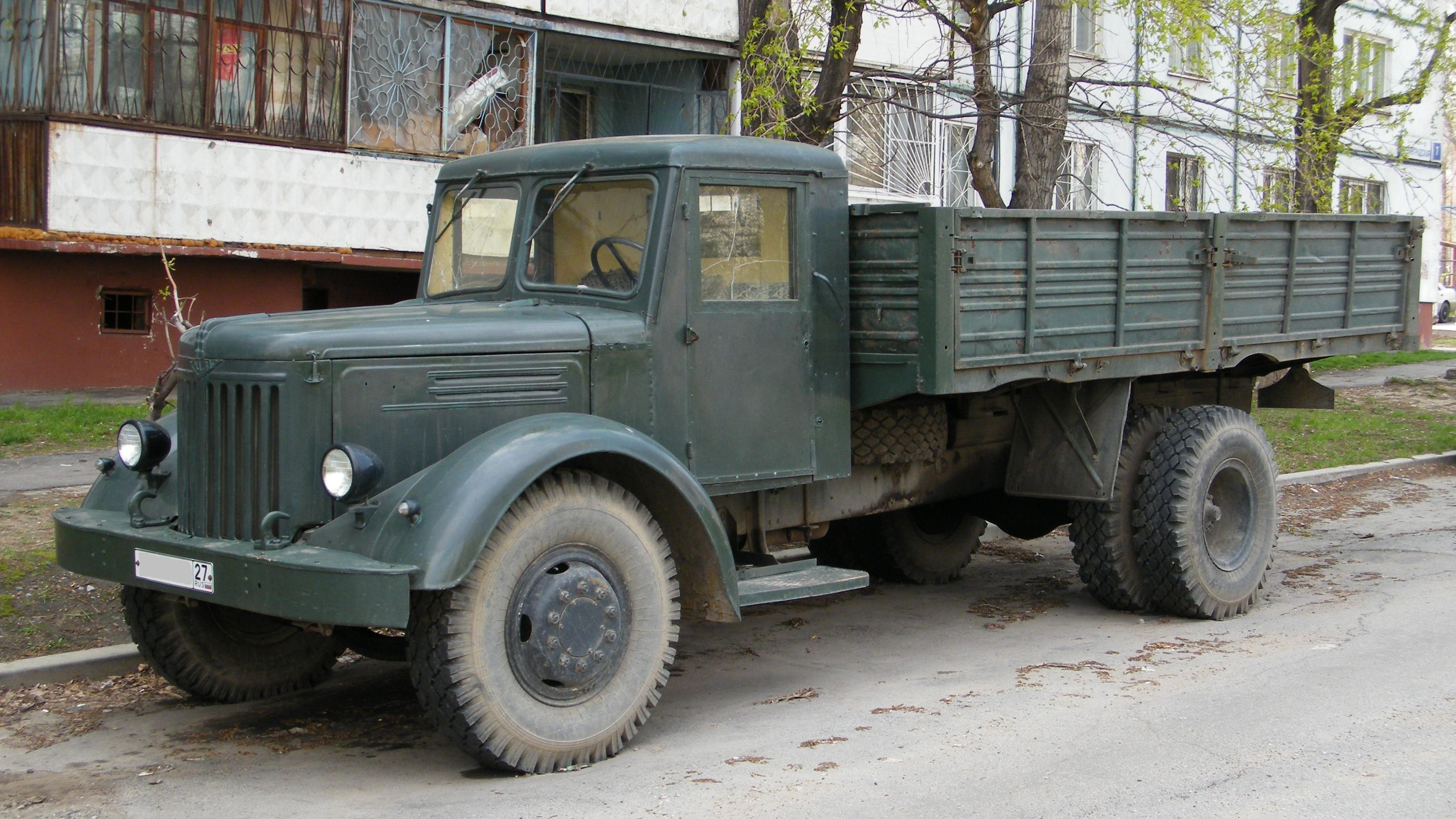

Overview
- Manufacturer: Yaroslavl Motor Plant; Minsk Automobile Plant
- Also called: YaAZ-200 (1947-1950)
- Production: 1947-1950 (YaAZ); 1950-1965 (MAZ)
- Assembly: Soviet Union: Yaroslavl (1947-1950); Soviet Union: Minsk (1950-1965)

Body and chassis
- Class: Truck
- Layout: FR layout

Powertrain
- Engine: 4.7L YaMZ-M204 I4 diesel (1947-1962); 11.1L YaMZ-236 V6 diesel (1962-1965)
- Transmission: 5-speed YaAZ-204 manual

Dimensions
- Wheelbase: 3,800 mm (150 in) (MAZ-205); 4,520 mm (178 in) (MAZ-200, 200V)
- Length: 6,065 mm (239 in) (MAZ-205); 6,495 mm (256 in) (MAZ-200V); 7,625 mm (300 in) (MAZ-200)
- Width: 2,650 mm (104 in)
- Height: 2,430 mm (96 in)
- Curb weight: 6,400 kg (14,110 lb)

Chronology
- Successor: MAZ-500

MAZ-200 was a Soviet truck manufactured at the Minsk Automobile Plant. It was the first Soviet truck powered by a diesel engine. The MAZ-200 was initially produced by YaAZ (Yaroslavl Automobile Plant), based in Yaroslavl, Russia, between 1947 and 1950, after which the production was moved to MAZ.

In 1962, it was re-engined with the YaMZ-236 V6 diesel.

== Variants ==
- MAZ-200: Standard production version.
  - MAZ-200D: Cab-chassis version.
  - MAZ-200G: Troop transport version. Produced 1951-1958.
  - MAZ-200P: As MAZ-200 except equipped with the YaMZ-236 engine.
  - MAZ-200V: Tractor-trailer version. Produced 1952-1966.
    - MAZ-200M: As MAZ-200V except equipped with the YaMZ-236 engine.
    - MAZ-200R: MAZ-200V with hydraulic systems to control tipper trailers.
- MAZ-205: Dump truck version. Produced 1947-1965.
- MAZ-501: Logging truck version. Produced 1955-1965.
  - MAZ-501B: MAZ-501 equipped with the YaMZ-236 engine.
  - MAZ-501V: Tractor-trailer version of MAZ-501.
- MAZ-502: Four-wheel-drive version. Produced 1957-1965.
  - MAZ-502V: Tractor-trailer version of MAZ-502.
- NAMI-020: Prototype 6×6 modification of MAZ-200. Later built as Ural-375.
- NAMI-021: Prototype 6×6 modification of MAZ-200. Later built as Ural-375H.

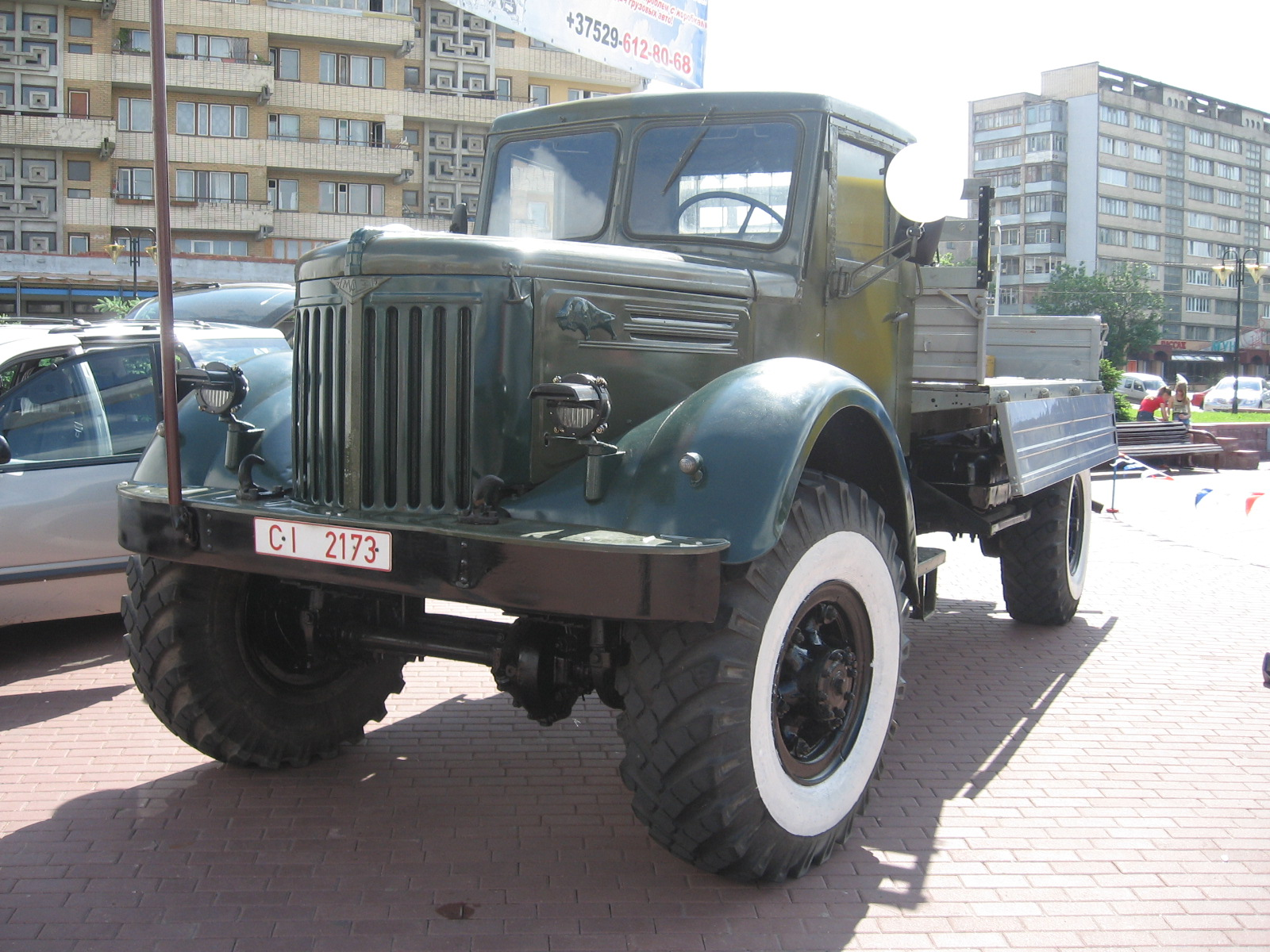
MAZ-502 (4x4)
