= Yaroslavl Motor Plant =

Russian engine manufacturer

PJSC "Autodiesel" YAMZ Order of Lenin and the October Revolution
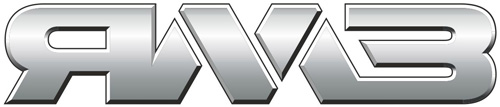

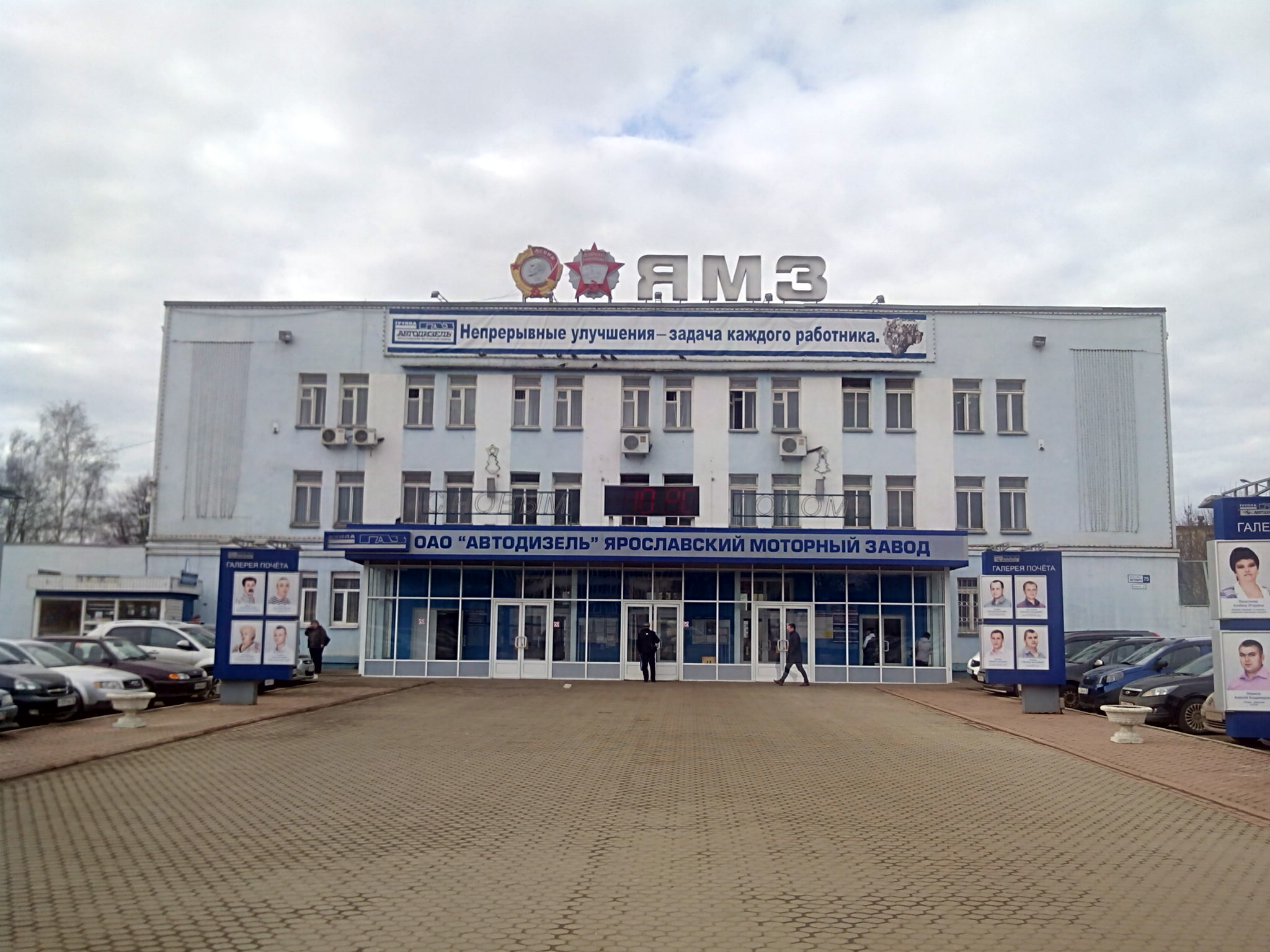
- YaMZ headquarters
- Trade name: ЯМЗ, YaMZ
- Native name: ПАО «Автоди́зель» ЯМЗ Ордена Ленина и Октябрьской Революции
- Romanized name: PAO "Avtodízel'" YAMZ Ordena Lenina i Oktyabr'skoy Revolyutsii
- Company type: Public joint-stock company
- Industry: Automotive
- Founded: 1916
- Founder: V.A. Lebedev
- Headquarters: Yaroslavl, Yaroslavl Oblast, Russia
- Key people: Matyushin Andrey - General Director of Yaroslavl Motor Plant
- Products: Engines, transmissions
- Revenue: 440,800,000,000 Russian ruble (1994)
- Website: www.ymzmotor.ru

The Yaroslavl Motor Plant (Russian: Яросла́вский мото́рный заво́д, ЯМЗ, romanized: Yaroslavskyi Motornyi Zavod, YaMZ) is a Russian company based in Yaroslavl that produces engines for many Russian companies.

== History ==
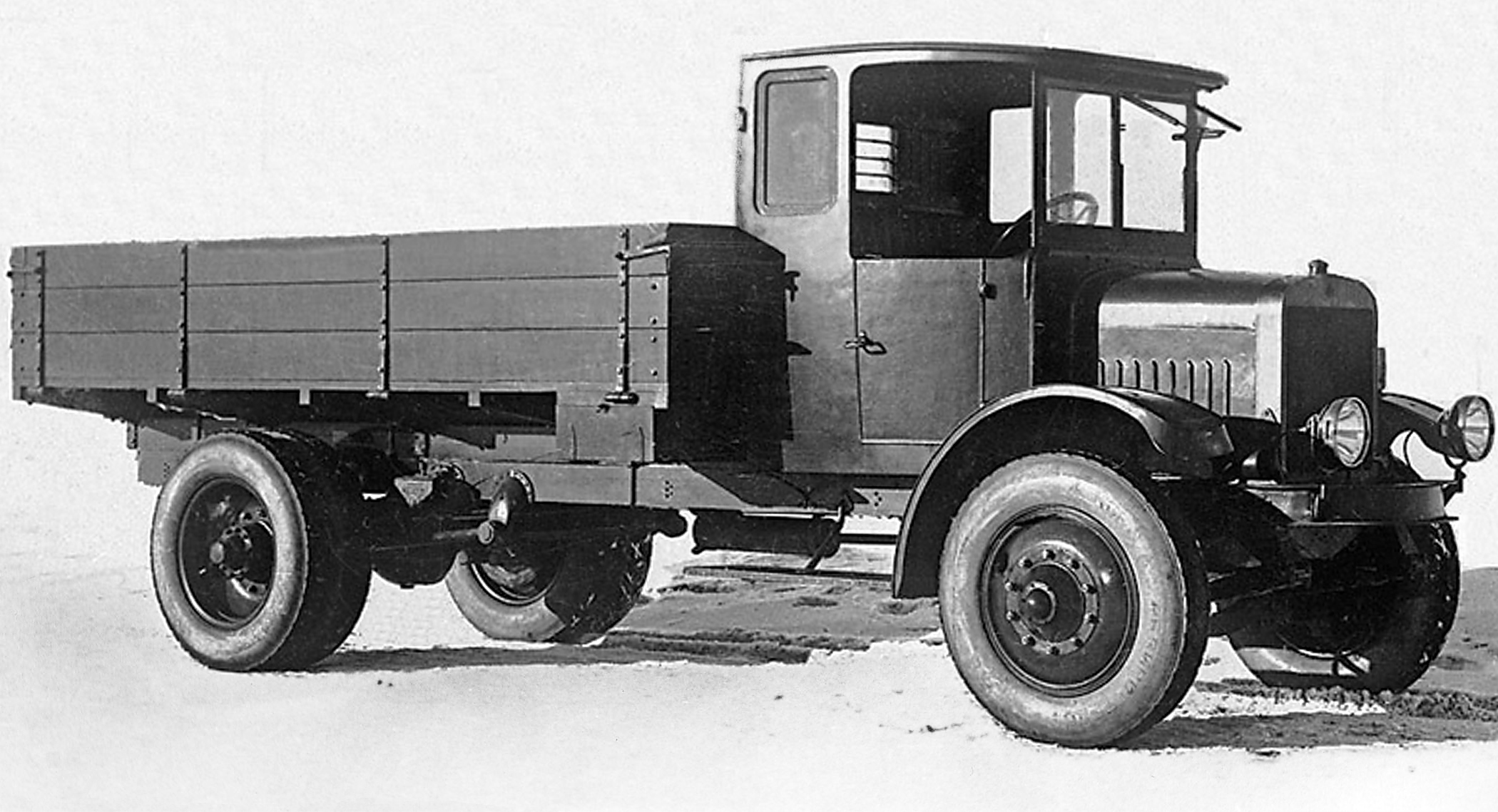
Ya-3 3-ton truck

Between 1925 and 1959, YaMZ produced heavy trucks. Back then it was also known as Yaroslavl Automobile Plant (YaAZ, Yaroslavskyi Avtomobilnyi Zavod).

== Trucks and buses ==
The trucks and buses YaMZ produced included:

=== Prewar models ===
- Ya-3 (1925–1928, based on White-AMO)
- Ya-4 (1928–1929, 4-ton truck powered by a 70 hp Mercedes engine)
- Ya-5 (1929–1934, 5-ton truck powered by a 93.5 hp Hercules YXC engine)
  - Ya-5 "Kodzhu" (1933, Ya-5 with a diesel engine)
- Ya-7 (1932, prototype 5-ton truck, powered by a 102 hp Continental 21R engine)
  - Ya-7D (1932, Ya-7 with two-speed auxiliary gearbox)
- Ya-8 (1932, prototype lengthened version of Ya-7)
- Ya-9D (1932, prototype 8-ton three axle truck)
- Ya-11 (1942, prototype 2-ton tracked artillery tractor, powered by two 86 hp GAZ-M engines)
- Ya-12 (1943–1946, Ya-11 with a 123 hp GMC 4-71 diesel engine)
- Ya-12D (1933, prototype tractor-trailer based on Ya-7D)
- Ya-13 (1943)
  - Ya-13F (1944–1945, production transferred to Plant No. 40 in 1946)
- YaG-3 (1932–1934, 4-ton truck, powered by a 60 hp AMO-3 engine)
- YaG-4 (1934–1936, 5-ton truck, powered by a 73 hp ZIS-5 engine)
- YaG-5 (1934–1935, export version of YaG-4 for Mongolia)
- YaG-6 (1936–1942, 5-ton truck, powered by a 73 hp ZIS-5 engine)
- YaG-6A (1940, YaG-6 with an 82 hp ZIS-15 engine)
- YaG-6M (1938-1940, YaG-6 with a 93.5 hp Hercules YXC engine)
- YaG-6 NATI Kodzhu (1938, YaG-6 with 105 hp diesel engine)
- YaG-7 (1938, prototype 5-ton cargo truck; cancelled due to WWII)
- YaG-8 (1939, as YaG-7 but with a longer wheelbase and carrying capacity increased to 7-ton and powered by a 110–120 hp NATI-MD-23 diesel engine
- YaG-10 (1932–1940, 8-ton three-axle truck)
- YaG-12 (1932, prototype 12-ton four-axle truck based on the YaG-10)
- YaS-1 (1935–1936, 4-ton dump truck version of YaG-4)
- YaS-3 (1936–1942, 4-ton dump truck version of YaG-6)
- YaS-4 (1939, prototype 4.5-ton dump truck based on YaG-7)
- YaSP (1934, prototype half-track based on YaG-4)

=== Postwar models ===
- YaAZ-200 (1947–1950, production moved to MAZ)
  - YaAZ-200V (1947?–1950, production moved to MAZ)
- YaAZ-205 (1945–1946, production moved to MAZ)
- YaAZ-210 (1951–1958, first Soviet heavy three-axle diesel truck)
  - YaAZ-210A (YaAZ-210 with all metal platform body, prototypes only)
  - YaAZ-210D (tractor-trailer version)
  - YaAZ-210E (mine truck version)
  - YaAZ-210G (ballast tractor version)
- YaAZ-214 (1956–1959, production moved to KrAZ, notable for PMP Floating Bridge)
- YaAZ-218 (1954 or 1957, prototype dump truck)
- YaAZ-219 (1957–1959, production moved to KrAZ; essentially a modified YaAZ-210 with the cab and engine from the YaAZ-214)
- YaAZ-221 (1957–1958, production moved to KrAZ)
- YaAZ-222 (1958–1959, production moved to KrAZ)
- YaAZ-225 (1949, production moved to MAZ and renamed MAZ-525)
- YaAZ-226 (late 1950s, prototype; cancelled in 1958 when truck production was moved to KrAZ)
  - YaAZ-227 (dump truck version of YaAZ-226)
  - YaAZ-229 (tractor-trailer version of YaAZ-226)
  - YaAZ-230 (off-road version of YaAZ-226)

=== Buses ===
- Ya-6 (1929-1932, bus version of Ya-5)
- YaA-2 (1932, prototype)
- YaA-3

=== Trolleybuses ===
- YaTB-1 (1936)
- YaTB-2 (1937)
- YaTB-3 (1938, double-decker)
- YaTB-4 (1938)
- YaTB-4a (1941)
- YaTB-5 (1941)

== Production ==
YaMZ produces several families of modern engines:

- YaMZ-530 straight 4 and 6 family of engines 120-312 hp (Euro IV ecology standard)
- YaMZ-650 6-cylinder engines with 362-412 hp (Euro III/Euro IV ecology standard)
- YaMZ-840 YaMZ8463 V12

Marine Diesel engines

- YaMZ-530 marinized version
- YaMZ-850 navalized version
- YaMZ-240 V12
- YaMZ-840 V12

Tutaev Motor Plant
Marine Diesel engines

- TMZ-880
- DRA-TMZ " Reka-400 "

SMZ
Savelovo Machinery mechanical engineering Plant (Kimry, Tver)

=== Historic engines ===
- YaAZ-204 inline-4 licence-built Detroit Diesel Series 71 engine
- YaAZ-206 inline-6 Detroit Diesel Series 71 engine
- YaMZ-236 V6
- YaMZ-238 V8
- YaMZ-240 V12
