= YaG-10 =

YAG-10

Overview
- Manufacturer: Yaroslavl Motor Plant
- Production: 1932–1940

Powertrain
- Engine: 94.5 hp Hercules-YXC-B
- Transmission: 4-speed Brown-Lipe-554, manual

Dimensions
- Length: 6.97 m
- Width: 2.47 m
- Height: 2.55 m
- Curb weight: 6800 kg

The 6x4, 8-ton YaG-10 truck was produced from 1932 to 1940 by the Yaroslavl Motor Plant in the Soviet Union. 333 trucks were made, 61 of which were converted into YaG-10 (29-K) 76.2 mm anti-aircraft trucks. The YaG-10 was powered by a Hercules-YXC engine, and the transmission was a 4-speed Brown-Lipe-554 manual gearbox. The suspension was based on trucks made by the Moreland Truck Company. While capable of carrying 8 tons on paved surfaces, it was limited to 5 tons off-road. It had a maximum speed of 42 km/h and fuel consumption of 60 liters per 100 km.
