= KrAZ-214 =

Soviet off-road 6x6 truck

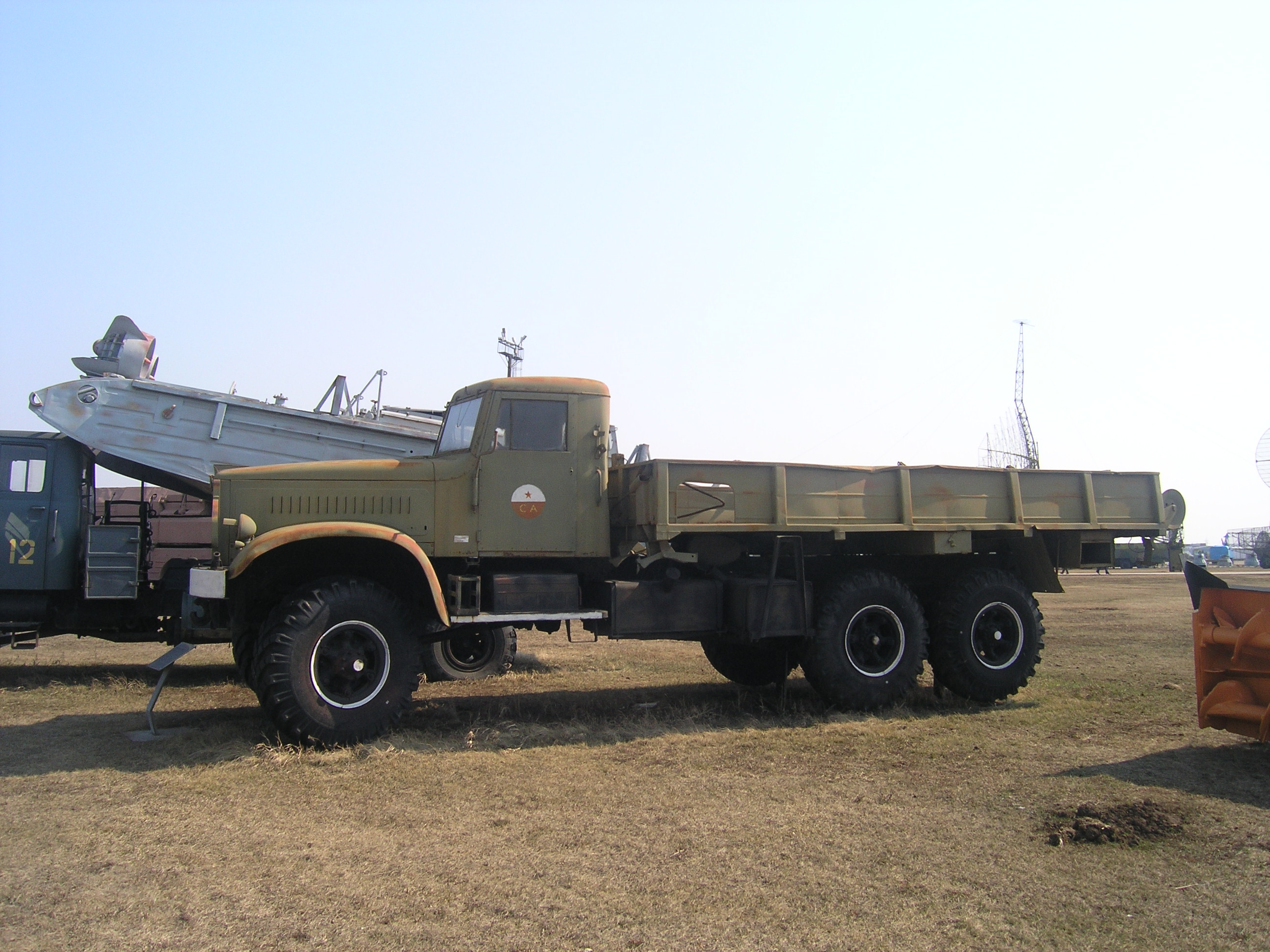

Overview
- Manufacturer: YaMZ (1956-1959); KrAZ (1959-1967)
- Also called: YaAZ-214 (1956-1959)
- Production: 1956–1967

Body and chassis
- Class: Truck
- Body style: Truck

Powertrain
- Engine: 7.0L YaAZ-M206B I6 diesel
- Transmission: 5-speed manual

Chronology
- Predecessor: YaG-10
- Successor: KrAZ-255

The KrAZ-214 is an off-road truck 6x6 for extreme operations. It was manufactured in the Soviet Union at the YaMZ plant from 1956-1959, after which production was moved to KrAZ. The model line was the successor to the YaG-10 trucks.

== Technical characteristics ==
- Engine: 6.97 L diesel 6 cyl.
- Power: 205 PS /2000rpm
- Torque: 765 Nm /1300rpm
- Top speed: 55 mph

== Variants ==
- KrAZ-214 (КрАЗ-214): cargo truck. Produced 1959-1963.
- KrAZ-214B (КрАЗ-214Б): Updated version of KrAZ-214 with improved suspension and a 24-volt electrical system. Produced 1963-1967.
- E-305V (Э-305В) - military excavator on KrAZ-214 chassis

== Operators ==
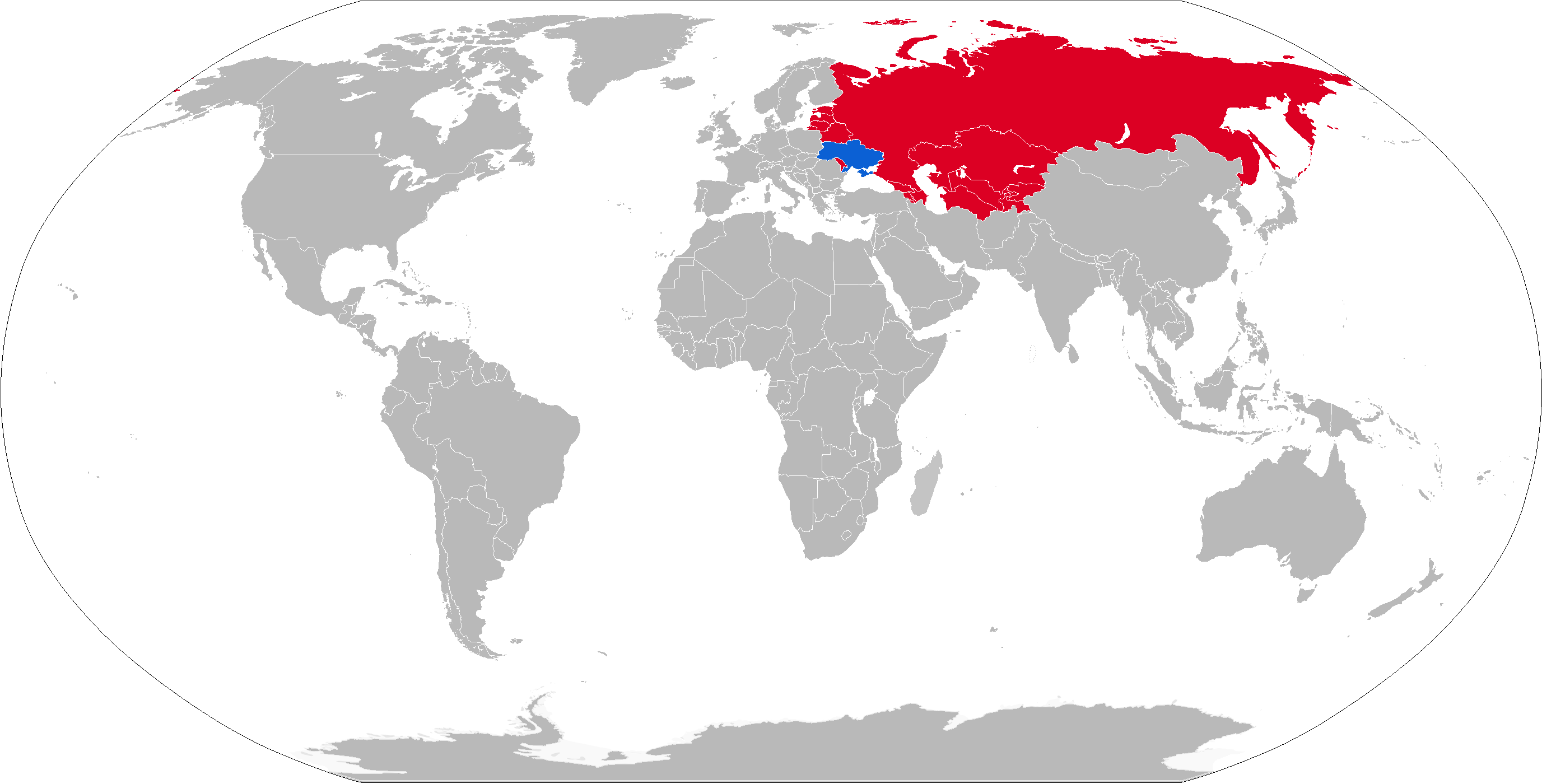
Map with KrAZ-214 current operators in blue and former operators in red.

=== Current operators ===
- Ukraine - One truck lost at the beginning of the 2022 Russian invasion of Ukraine.

=== Former operators ===
- Soviet Union - Soviet Armed Forces
