= Vehicle registration plates of Vatican City =

Vatican
- Vatican regular privately owned standard number plate.
- Country: Vatican City
- Country code: V

Current series
- Size: 520 mm × 110 mm 20.5 in × 4.3 in
- Serial format: Not standard
- Colour (front): Black on white
- Colour (rear): Black on white

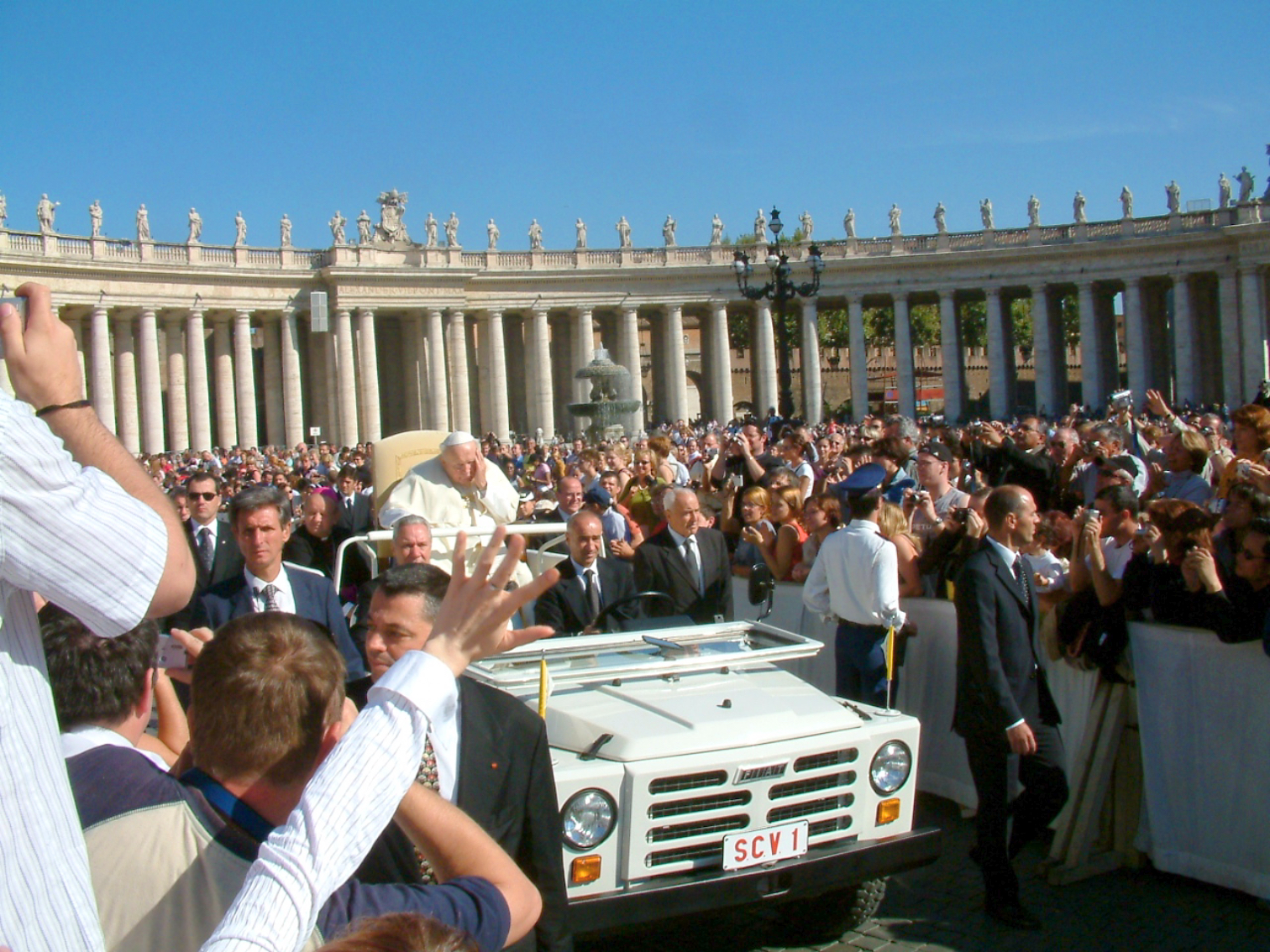
Pope John Paul II in a Popemobile in the Vatican City State, with Vatican registration SCV 1

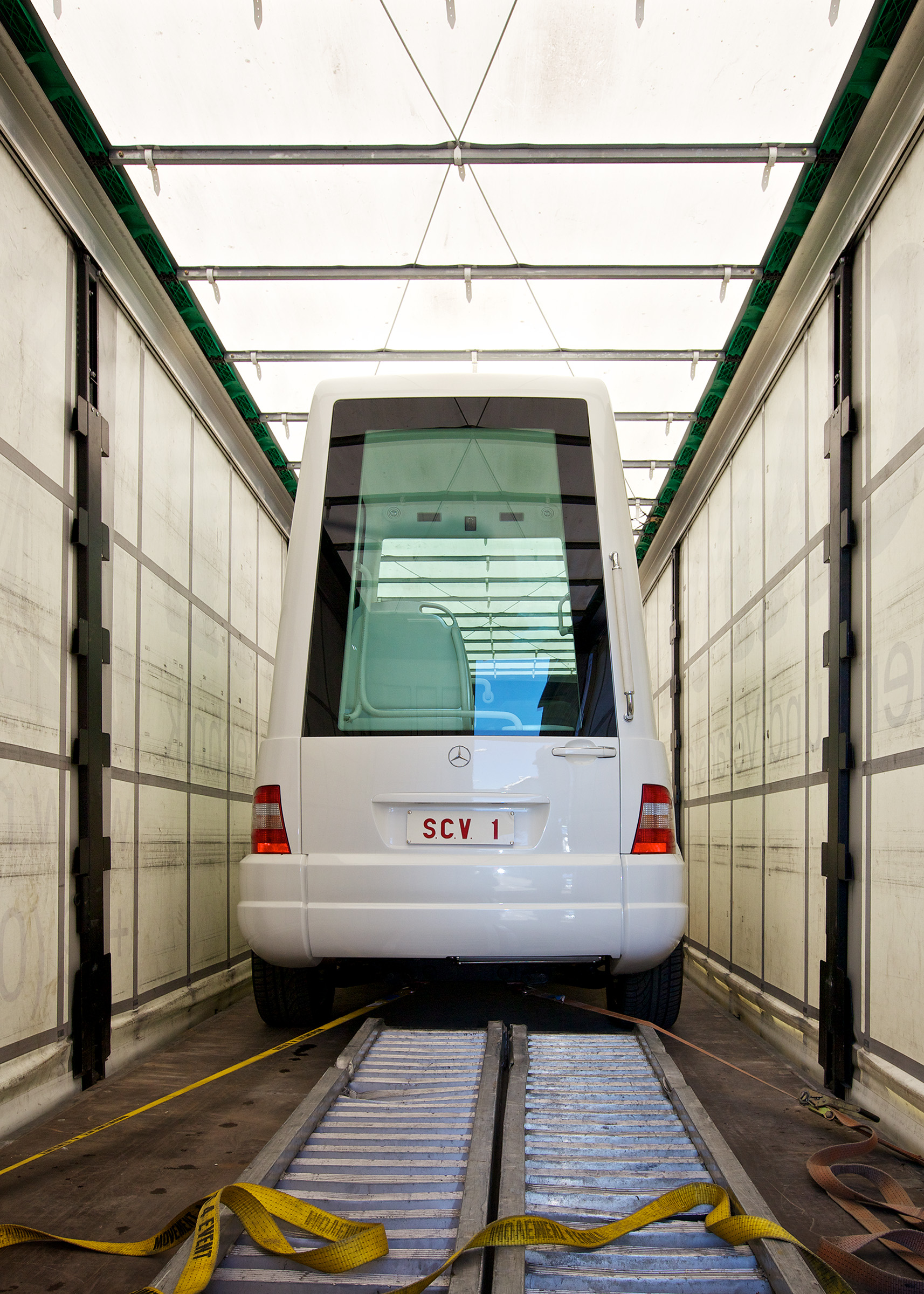
Pope Benedict XVI's Mercedes-Benz M-Class Popemobile in 2011, with Vatican registration SCV 1

Vehicle registration plates of official road vehicles registered in Vatican City use the prefix SCV (Latin: Status Civitatis Vaticanae, lit. 'Vatican City State') followed by a series of digits while vehicle registration plates of residential road vehicles registered in Vatican City use the prefix CV (Italian: Città del Vaticano, lit. 'Vatican City') followed by a series of digits. The Popemobile carries the registration SCV 1 in red lettering. The other vehicles that the Pope uses also carry red letters.

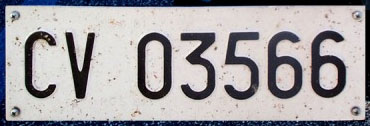
Private vehicle front plate

The international vehicle registration code for the Vatican City is V. Vatican registration plates does not incorporate this code. When driving outside of the Vatican, as a contracting party of the Geneva Convention on Road Traffic, the distinguishing sign of the country of registration must be displayed on the rear of the vehicle, in black letters on a white background having the shape of an ellipse.

The international vehicle registration code of the Vatican

== Vehicle types ==
Vehicle types
Type	Example	Prefix Meaning
Private		Civitatis Vaticanae ("Vatican City")
Papal		Status Civitatis Vaticanae ("Vatican City State")
Government		
Official		

== See also ==
- Transport in Vatican City
