= British Commercial Vehicle Museum =

Automobile museum in Lancashire, England

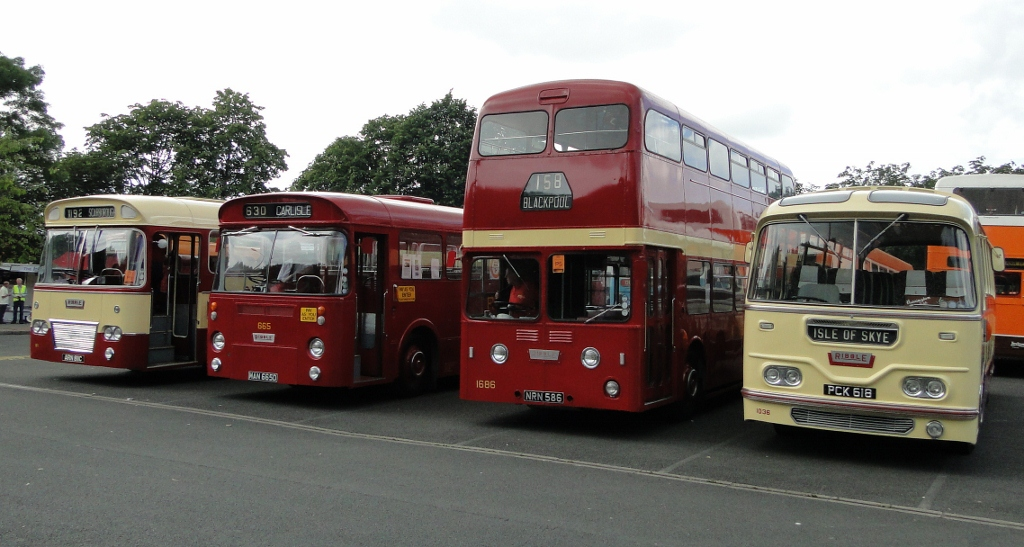
- Ribble buses at the museum in 2012

- Location within the Borough of South Ribble
- Established: 1983; 43 years ago
- Location: King Street, Leyland, Lancashire, England
- Coordinates: 53.6947°N 2.6926°W
- Chairperson: John Gilchrist
- Website: www.britishcommercialvehiclemuseum.com

The British Commercial Vehicle Museum displays antiquarian buses, early fire engines and other historical and commercial vehicles produced by the British manufacturing industry.

The museum is located in King Street, Leyland, Lancashire on part of a site previously occupied by the Leyland Motors factory, the source of many exhibits.

Funding methods include the admission charges and membership tickets. More recently, a major investment by the Heritage Lottery Fund has contributed to a major refurbishment and website redesign by local digital agency Fertile Frog. The museum is now open throughout the year( see website for details ).

Events include Classic Vehicles, Model Makers Exhibition and the Spring Transport Show.

In 2010, the museum was one of three featured on Richard Macer's BBC Four series Behind the Scenes at the Museum.

== Exhibits ==
Exhibits include the purpose-built Popemobile from the 1982 visit by Pope John Paul II to the United Kingdom. The 24-ton armour-plated vehicle was built for the visit by British Leyland.

Other exhibits that have been displayed include a WWI Gun Tractor, a Leyland Tiger Cub, historic lorries, vintage buses and a Steam Driven Showman's Tractor.
