= Star 66 =

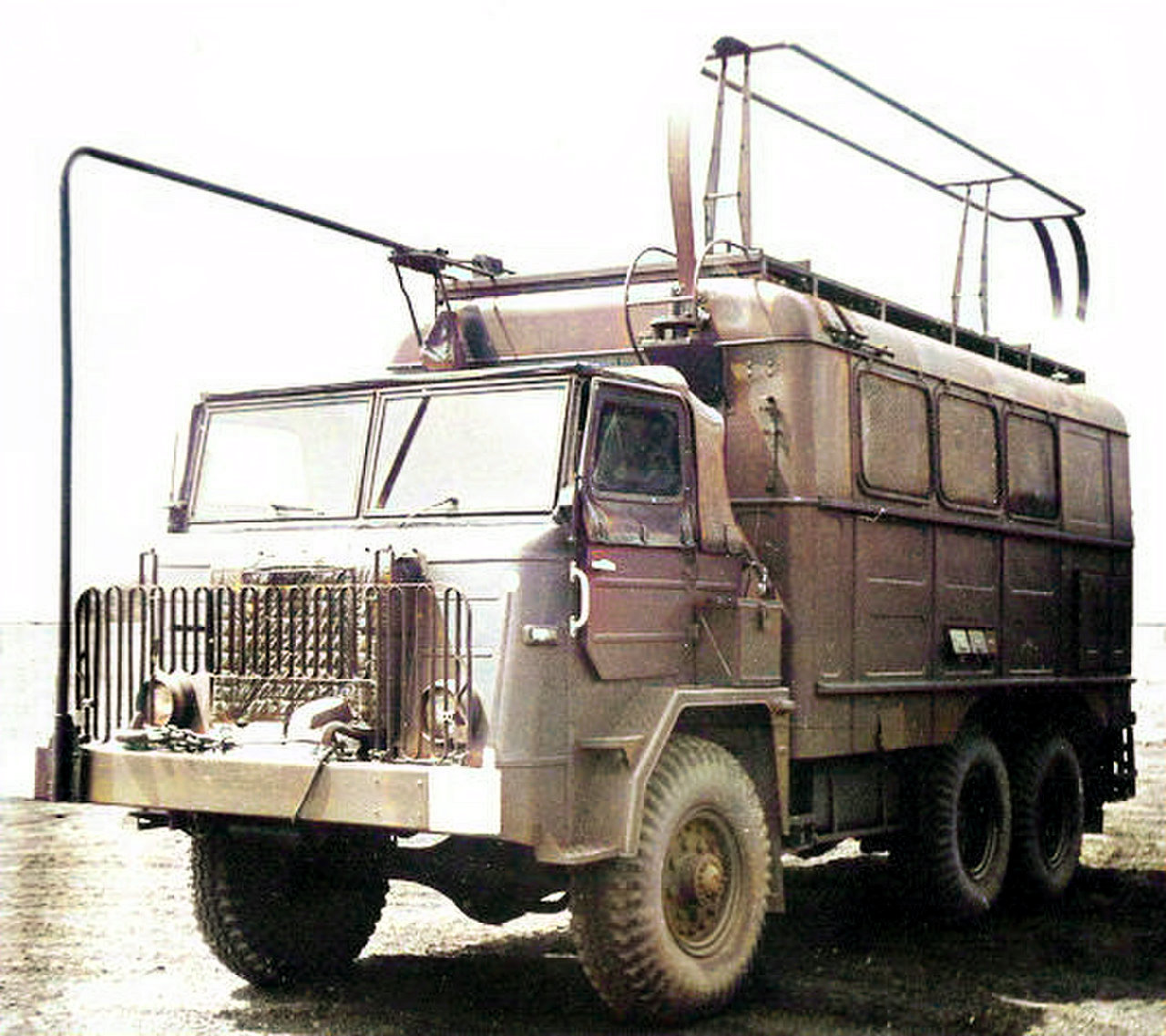

Overview
- Manufacturer: FSC Star
- Production: 1958–1965
- Assembly: Poland

Body and chassis
- Class: 6x6 Truck

Powertrain
- Engine: 4,6L S47 V6
- Transmission: 5-speed, manual, unsynchronised

Dimensions
- Length: 6528 mm
- Width: 2400 mm
- Height: 2875 mm
- Curb weight: 5200 kg

Chronology
- Successor: Star 660

The Star 66 is a general purpose 6x6 army truck designed in Poland by FSC Star in Starachowice.

== History ==
In 1952, the State Commission for Economic Planning and the Main Board for Armament and War Technology Planning organized a competition for the development of technical documentation for a medium-duty off-road truck. According to the competition criteria, the projects had to use as many components of the Star 20 and Lublin 51 trucks as possible. The first results of the work were presented in June 1952 by the Automotive Industry Design Office from Warsaw and its Łódź branch. After the competition committee approved the presented projects, two prototypes of the two-axle Star 44 model and the three-axle Star 66 model were built in 1953.

The design of the prototype Star 44 was mounted on a longitudinal welded frame made of pressed sheet metal. The running gear used a front and rear rigid drive axle suspended on semi-elliptical leaf springs. The rear drive axle was equipped with a mechanically controlled differential lock. The drive was provided by a prototype, 6-cylinder, in-line petrol engine of the S44 type, with a displacement of 4680 cm^{3} and a maximum power of 63 kW (85.7 HP). The engine was coupled with a 5-speed manual, non-synchronised gearbox from the Star 20 model. The gearbox was locked with a two-speed reducer.

The body of the second model, which was the three-axle prototype of the Star 66, was mounted on a longitudinal welded frame made of pressed sheet metal. The running gear consisted of a front rigid drive axle suspended on semi-elliptical leaf springs, and a middle and rear drive axle, each suspended on two inverted semi-elliptical leaf springs and six reaction rods. The middle and rear drive axles were equipped with a mechanical differential lock. The drive was provided by a prototype, 6-cylinder, in-line petrol engine of the S46 type, with a displacement of 4680 cm^{3} and a maximum power of 75.5 kW (102.5 HP). The 5-speed manual, non-synchronised gearbox was coupled to a 2-speed reduction gear.

After road tests of the prototypes in 1954, it was decided not to continue work on the Star 44 model and to focus solely on the development of the Star 66 design. The reason for this decision was the impossibility of simultaneous production of two models, caused by the technical and financial limitations of the Polish automotive industry at that time. In the same year, further modernised prototypes of this vehicle were built, which were tested by the army until 1955. After a positive opinion was issued by a commission of the Ministry of National Defence, in January 1956 the technical documentation of the serial versions was approved and work began to prepare the factory in Starachowice for the production of this model.

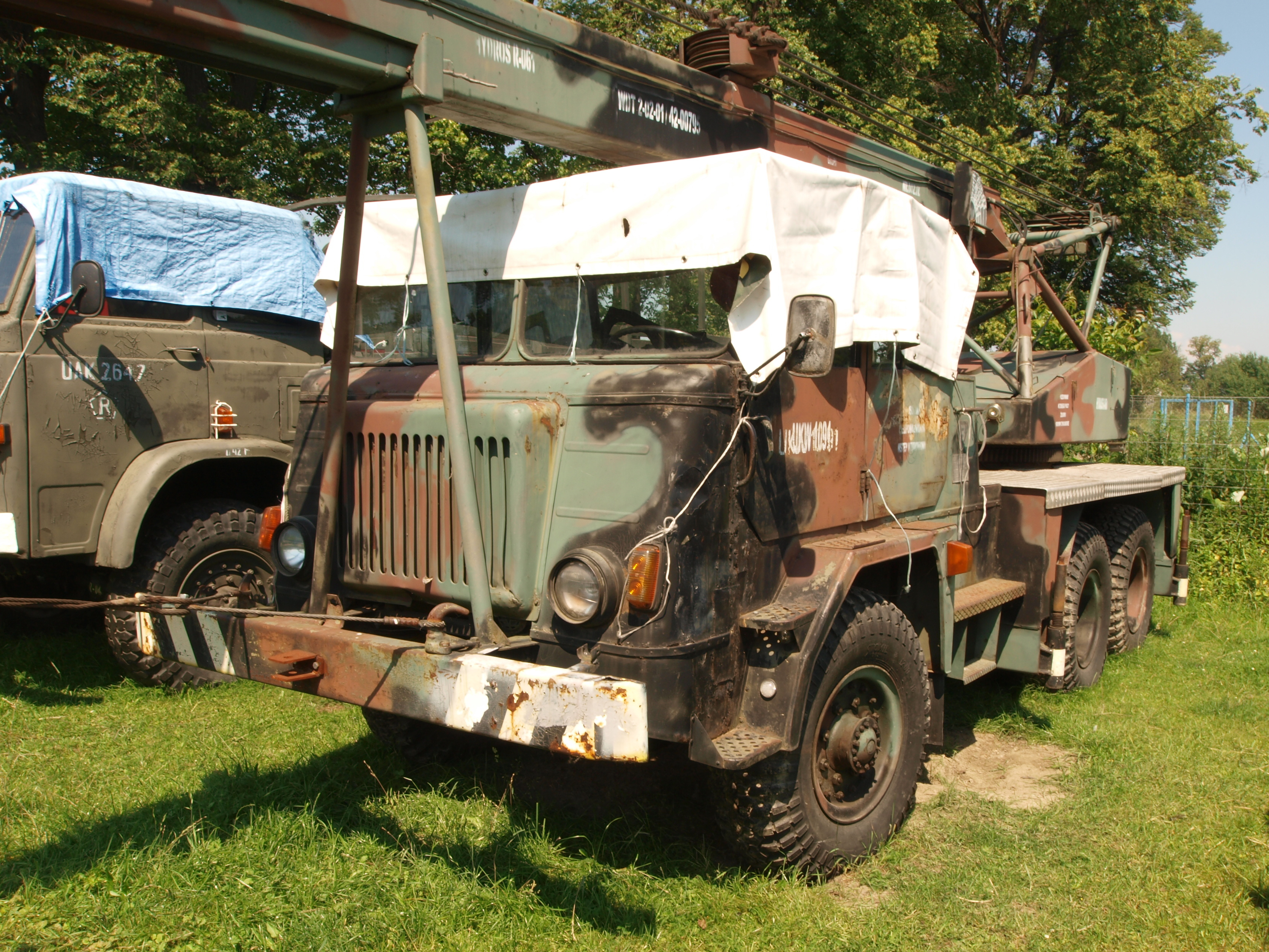
Star 66 military crane truck

Serial production of the Star 66 began in 1958. The vehicle body, similarly to the prototype versions, was mounted on a welded longitudinal frame made of pressed sheet metal. The running gear featured a front rigid drive axle suspended on semi-elliptical leaf springs, additionally supported by two hydraulic arm shock absorbers. The suspension of the middle and rear axles consisted of drive axles, each suspended on two inverted semi-elliptical leaf springs and six reaction rods. The middle and rear drive axles were equipped with a mechanically controlled differential lock. The braking system was equipped with a vacuum power steering system. The Star 66 was powered by a 6-cylinder, in-line petrol engine of the S47 type, with a displacement of 4680 cm^{3} and a maximum power of 77.3 kW (105 HP). The drive unit was coupled to a 5-speed manual, non-synchronized gearbox, connected via a tubular shaft to a mechanically controlled two-speed reducer.

The Star 66 was equipped with an open, two-person N66-type wagon cabin with a canvas roof that folded backwards and a two-part windscreen.

The production of the Star 66 ended in 1965, after the introduction of the Star 660 model, a modernized version of its predecessor.
