= Popemobile =

Custom automobile used by the pope

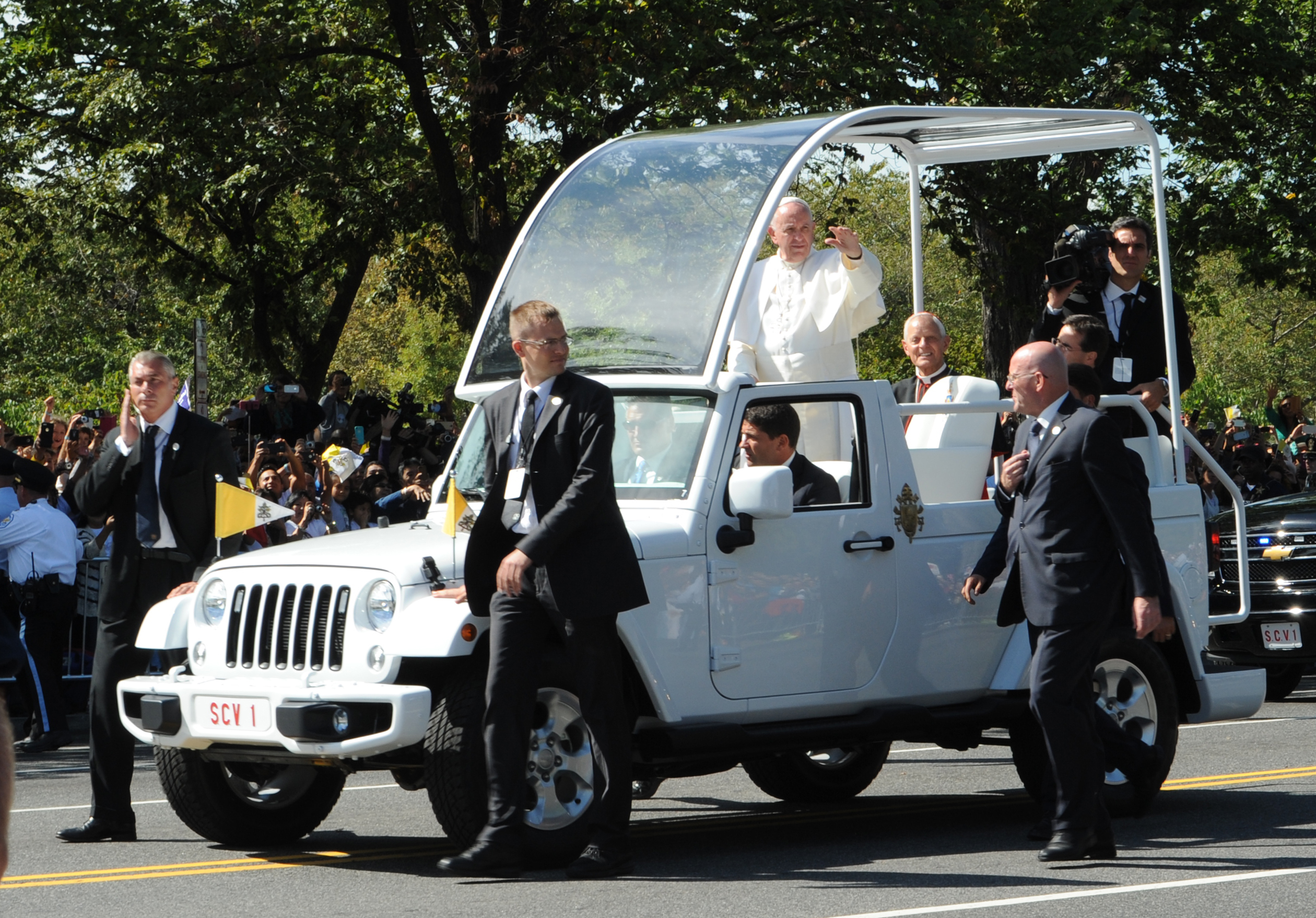
Pope Francis in a Jeep J8 in Washington, D.C. during his September 2015 visit

The popemobile (Latin: papacinetum or papocinetum; Italian: papamobile) is a specially designed motor vehicle used by the pope for public appearances. It is the successor to the sedia gestatoria (portable throne) and is designed to make the pope more visible when greeting large crowds.

There have been many different designs for the pope's method of vehicular transport. Some are open-air, while others have bulletproof glass walls to enclose the pope, deemed necessary following the 1981 assassination attempt on Pope John Paul II. Some allow the pope to sit, while others are designed to accommodate him standing. The Roman Curia selects an appropriate vehicle for each usage depending upon the level of security needed, distance and speed of travel, and the pope's preferences.

Mercedes-Benz has been the most frequent provider of papal vehicles since it provided the Vatican with its first automobile in 1930. The Vatican acquired its first electric vehicle for transporting the pope in December 2024 and has said that it plans to make all vehicles for transporting the pope electric by 2030.

The vehicle registration plates of Vatican City all begin with the letters "SCV", an abbreviation of the Latin Status Civitatis Vaticanae ("Vatican City State"), followed by the vehicle fleet number. The registration plate for the Ford Focus used by Pope Francis was "SCV 00919". In the past, the pope's transportation vehicle has typically used registration plate "SCV 1", although plates numbered "SCV 2" to "SCV 9" have also been used.

== History ==
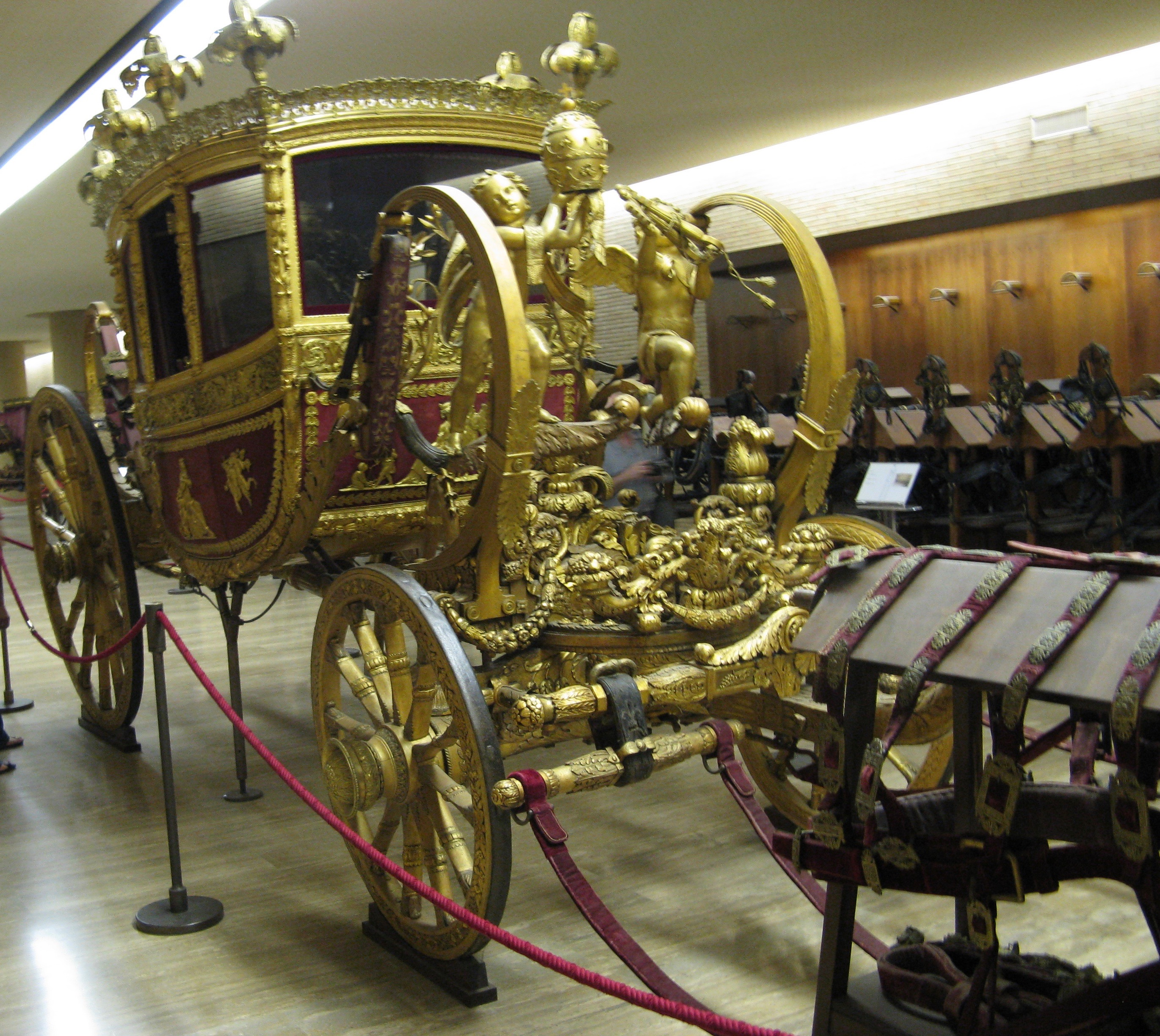
Papal carriage, Vatican Historical Museum

Before the first papal carriage, popes used the sedia gestatoria, a chair carried on the shoulders of papal attendants for public appearances. This fell out of use after the death of Pope Paul VI in 1978. Pope John Paul I, who succeeded Paul VI and reigned for only 33 days before his death, was the last pope to use the sedia gestatoria.

Papal carriages were adorned with red velvet upholstery and gilded engravings and trimmings. Several were used in the 1800s, many of which have been restored and are on display at the Carriage Pavilion exhibit of the Vatican Museums.

An inventory from the papal stables in 1841 shows the carriages were pulled by horses with names such as Bandito (Bandit), Pomposino (Pompous), Bufalino (Buffalo), and Capitano (Captain).

On 10 November 1929, the Vatican would get its first automobile when the Graham brothers who led the Detroit-based Graham-Paige Motors Corporation donated a Graham-Paige 837 limousine. Pope Pius XI used this limousine to travel to the Basilica of St. John Lateran on 22 December 1929. However, the Nurburg 460 Pullman which was given to Pope Pius XI in 1930 by German car manufacturer Mercedes-Benz is considered to have been to first "official" automobile used to transport the pope.

The term "popemobile" was first used in English-language media to refer to a custom-built Lincoln Continental used by Pope Paul VI during a pastoral visit to New York City in 1965. After the visit, the car was sold to Fort Dodge, Iowa eye doctor Eric Swanson, who promoted it as the "Pope-Mobile" and loaned it for other uses, including ticker-tape parades for the Apollo astronauts.

=== Usage by John Paul II ===
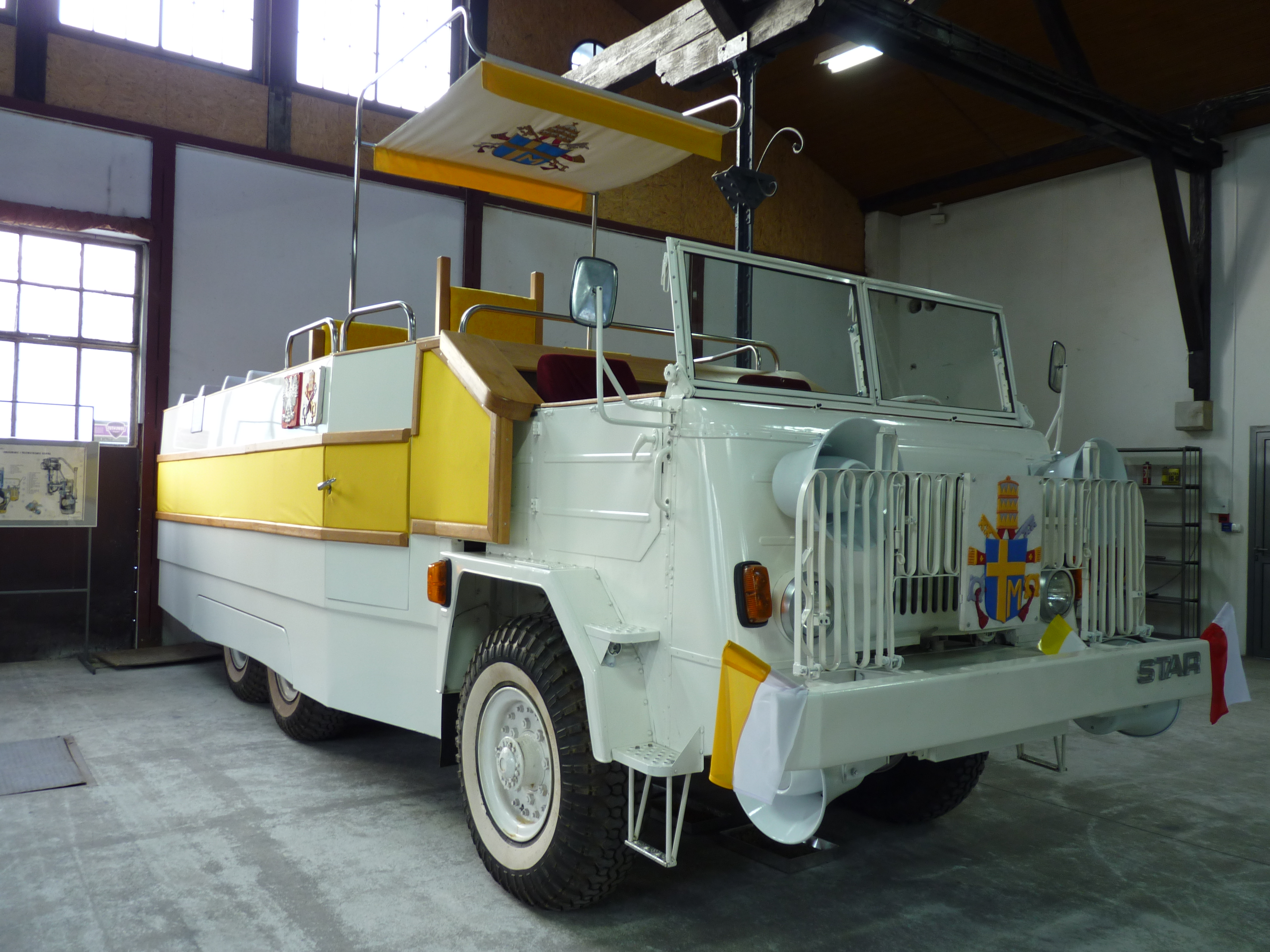
The Star 660, John Paul II's first designated automobile

The first time that John Paul II traveled to his native Poland in 1979, he was transported in the white vehicle based on the Polish Star 660 truck from a firm FSC Star. For John Paul II's visit to Ireland in 1979, Ford Ireland donated a D series truck which was adapted by OBAM coachbuilders; in 2017 it was available for private rental in Dublin. It was bigger than the truck used later in Vatican City. Another automobile was a modified Mercedes-Benz with a small-window enclosure in the back where the Pope sits. A converted 230 G Mercedes-Benz G-Class was built for John Paul II's visit to Germany in 1980.

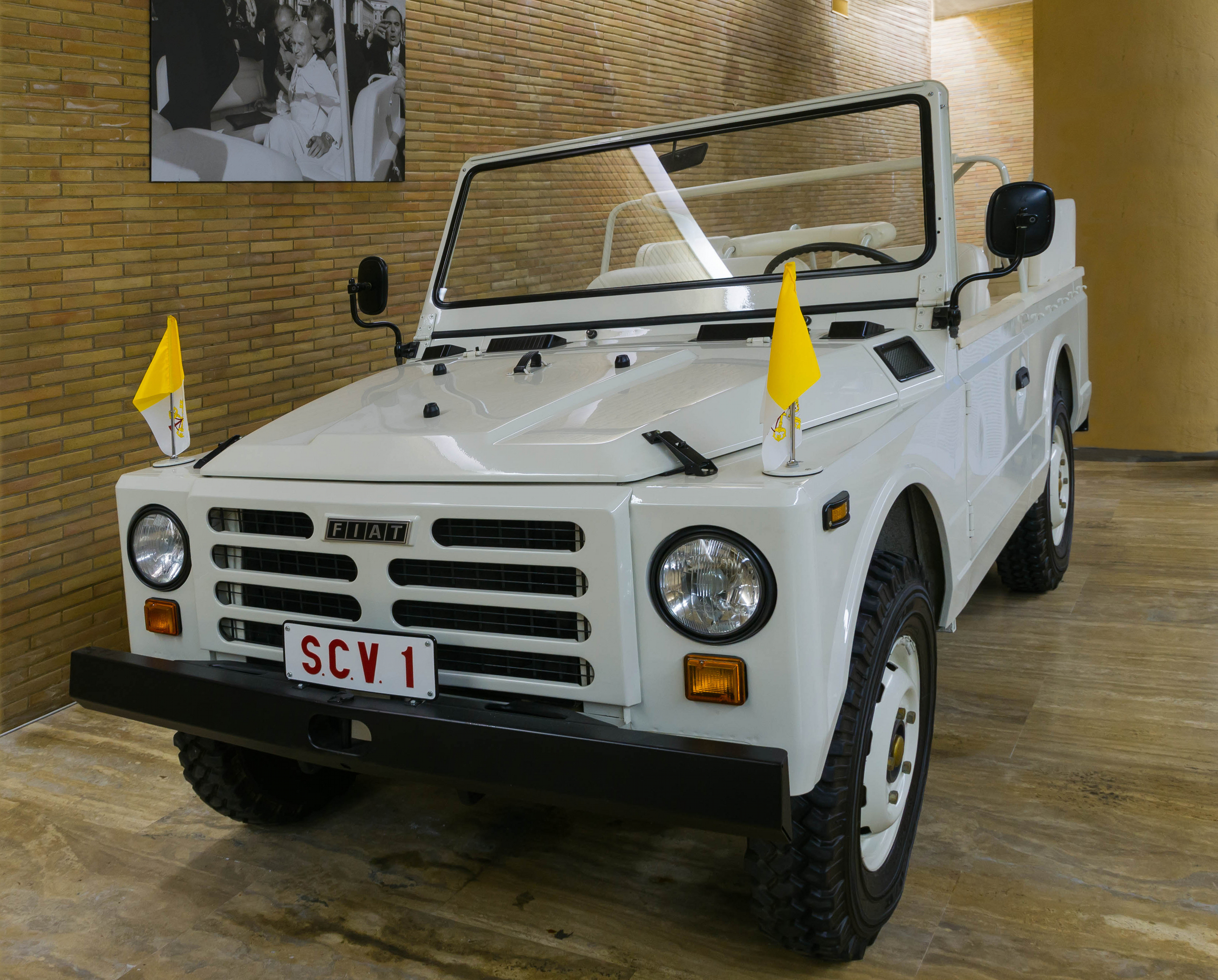
The Fiat Campagnola in which John Paul II was the subject of an assassination attempt in May 1981

Following the attempted assassination of John Paul II in 1981, the pope's designated automobile was fitted with bulletproof glass. British Leyland supplied both Leyland T45 lorry-based and Range Rover SUV-based armored automobiles in 1982 for the pope's visit to the United Kingdom. One of the two T45-based vehicles used was sold at auction in 2006 for £37,000, the other is kept in the British Commercial Vehicle Museum in Leyland, UK. One of the Range Rovers is exhibited at the National Museum of Funeral History in Houston, Texas. The Pope used an automobile derived from the SEAT Panda model during his visit to Spain in 1982; this specific car was open-air with a grab handle in front so that the Pope could stand still and greet the crowds while moving. The Pope entered the Camp Nou football stadium in Barcelona, driving through the assembled crowds celebrating Mass for a congregation of over 121,000 on 17 November 1982.

During the Pope's visit to Canada in 1984, a modified GMC Sierra was used as a base, rebuilt by the Thibault Fire Engines Company in Pierreville, Quebec. It was subsequently used for the 1998 papal visit to Cuba and was displayed at the Canada Science and Technology Museum in Ottawa in 2005. The second truck built by the Thibault Fire Engines Company was sent back to the Vatican in 1984.

During the papal visit to the United States in September 1987, a pair of Mercedes-Benz 230 G automobiles were flown to Washington, D.C., and modified by the United States Secret Service to provide access to the papal compartment from the driver's cabin, a design that continued to be used after the trip. One of these vehicles has been retired and is currently on display at the Mercedes-Benz Museum in Stuttgart, Germany.

In 2002, John Paul II requested that the media stop referring to the car as the "popemobile", saying that the term was "undignified".

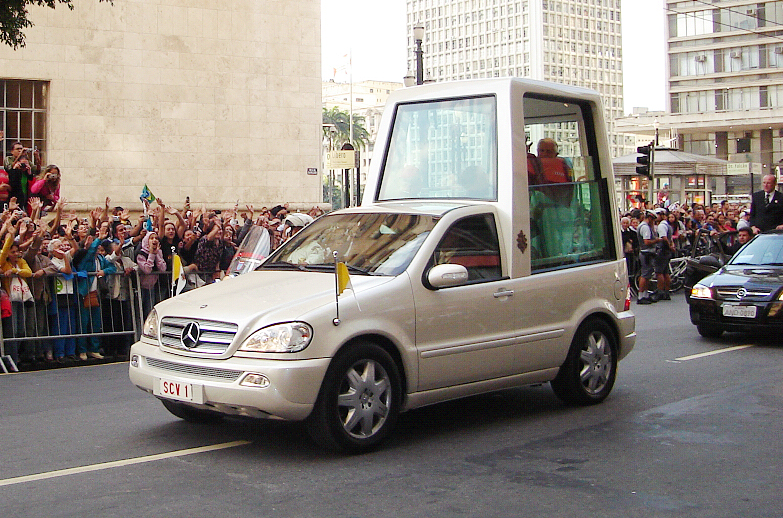
Benedict XVI in a modified Mercedes-Benz M-Class in São Paulo in 2007

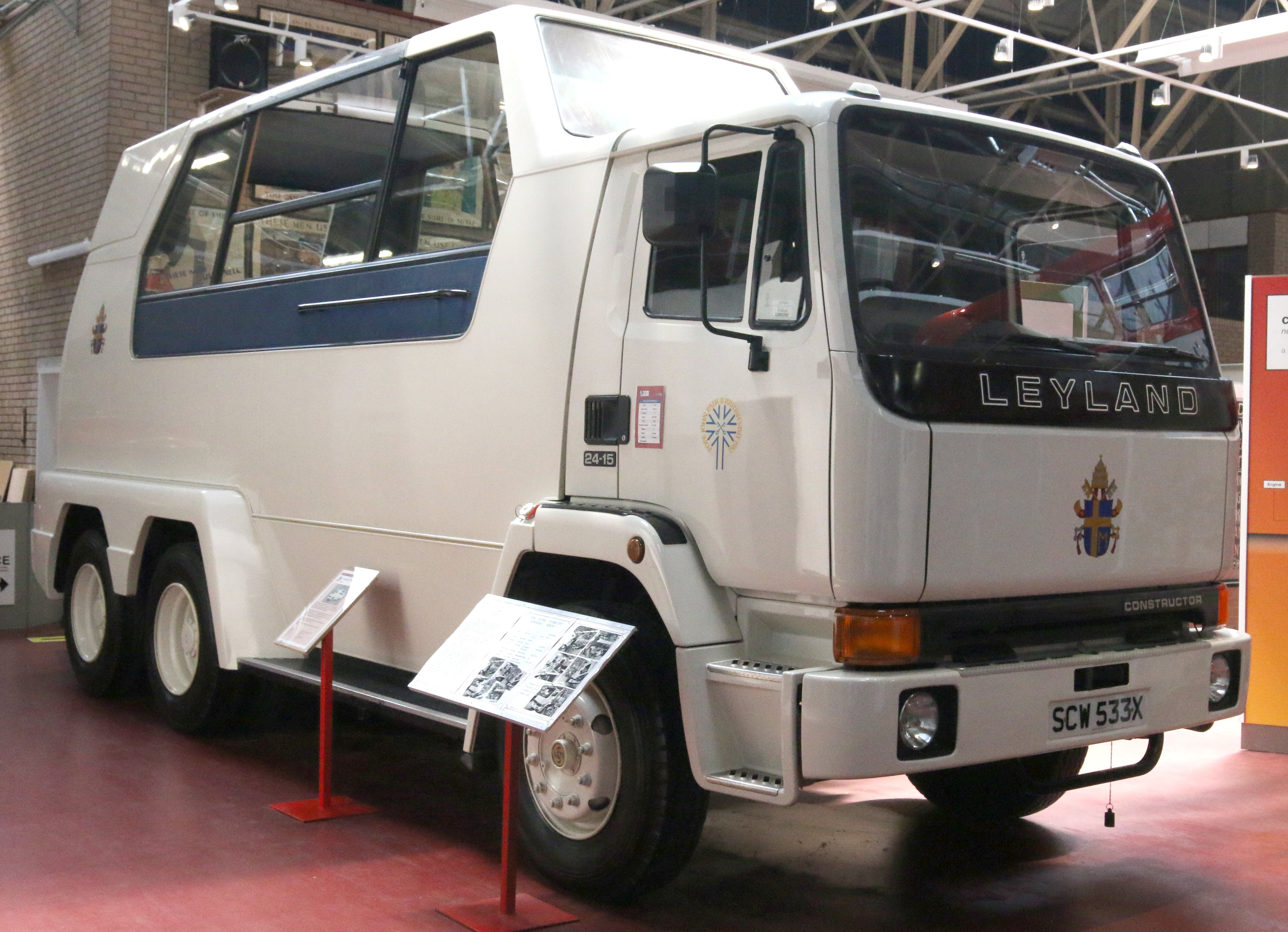
One of the two custom built vehicles on Leyland Constructor chassis for John Paul II's visit to the United Kingdom from May to June 1982

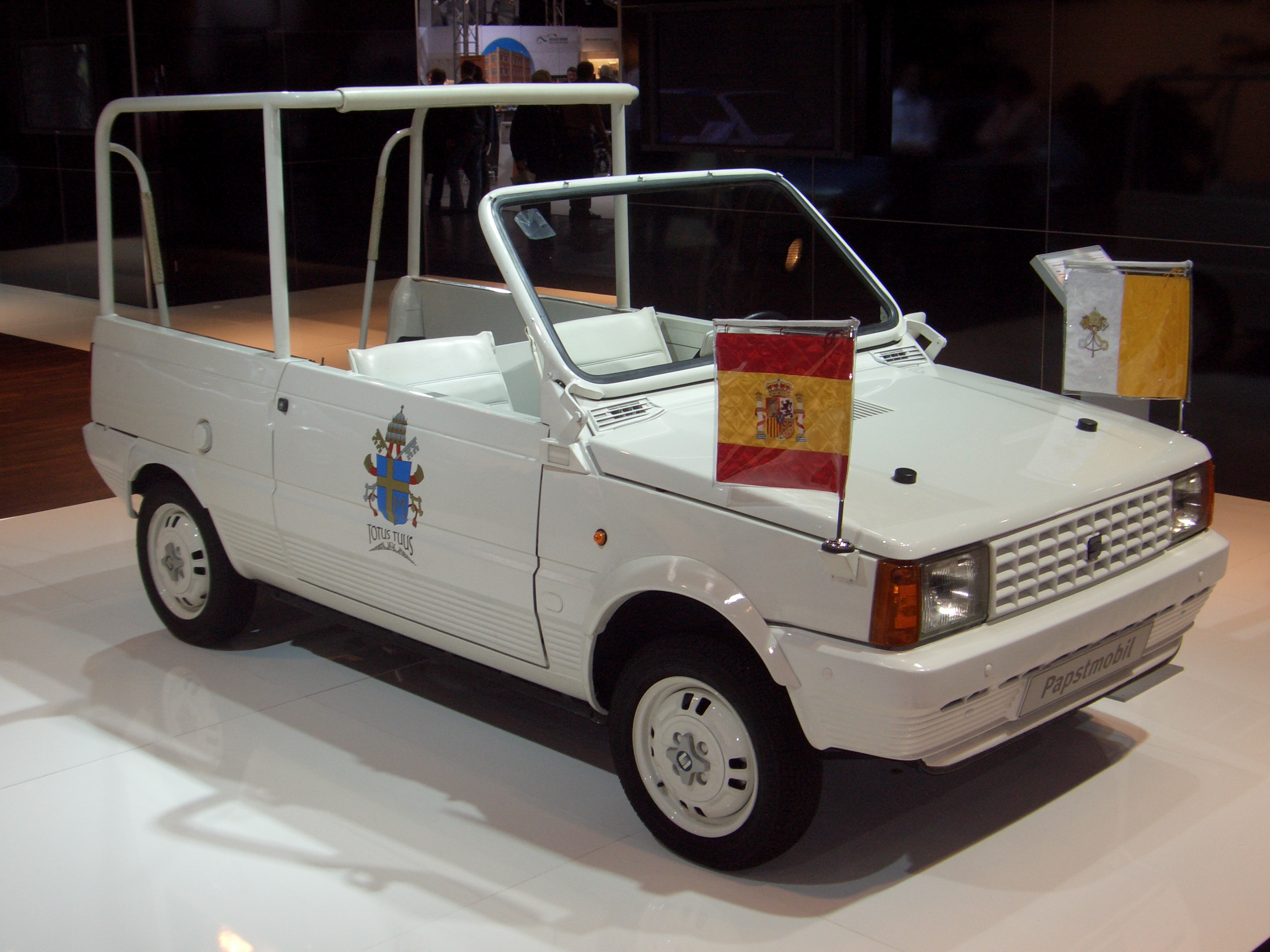
SEAT Panda used by John Paul II during his visit to Spain in October/November 1982

=== Usage by Benedict XVI ===
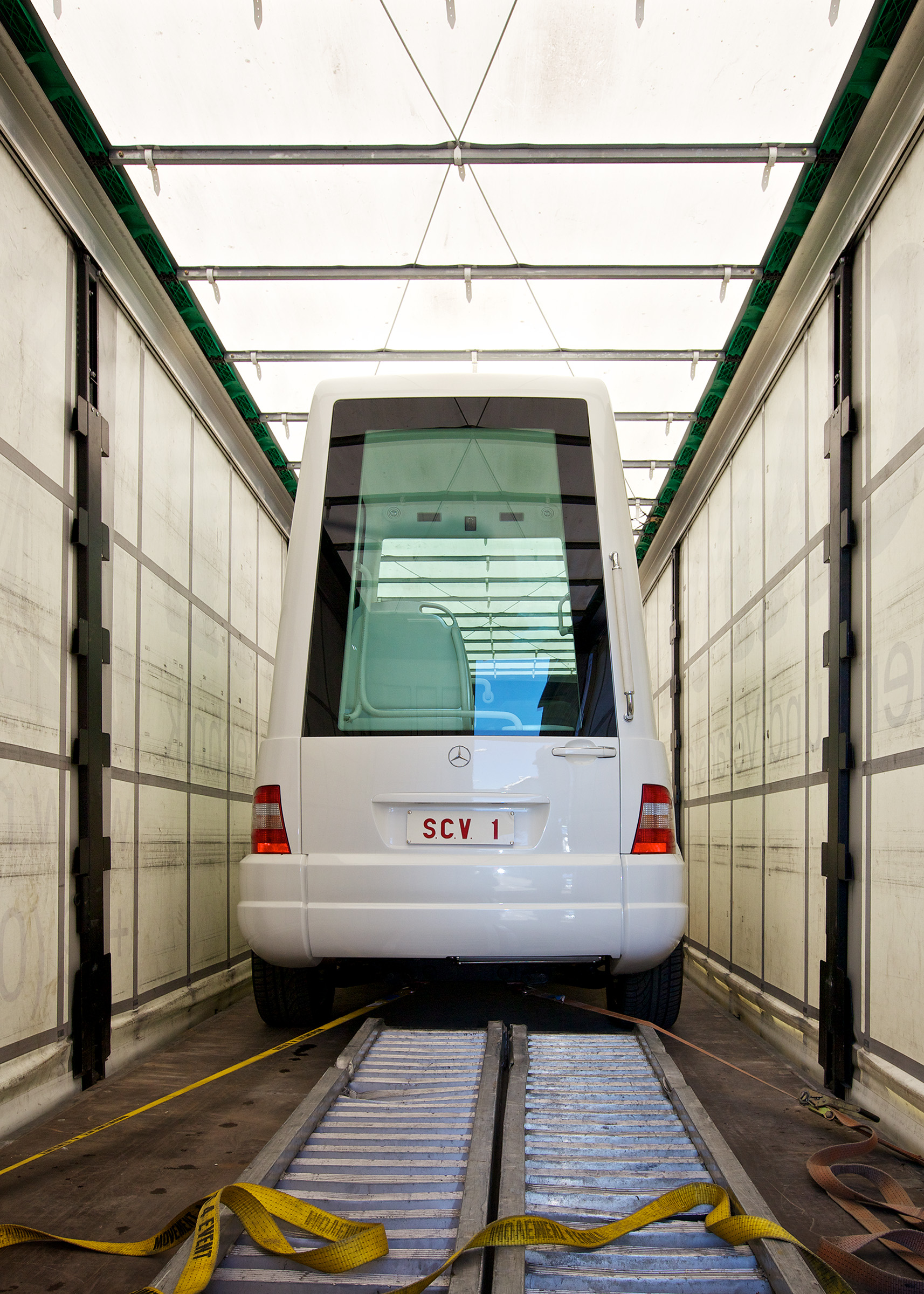
Benedict XVI's Mercedes-Benz M-Class after his visit to Freiburg im Breisgau in 2011

The Popemobile most often used by Pope Benedict XVI when traveling abroad was a modified Mercedes-Benz M-Class sport utility vehicle, with a special glass-enclosed room that had its own oxygen supply built into the back of the vehicle. To enter the vehicle, Benedict would proceed through a rear door and ascend several steps. He then sat in a chair made from white leather with gold trim, elevated into the glass room by a hydraulic lift which aided his visibility. In addition to the driver, there is room for one passenger (usually a security agent) in the front of the vehicle. The glass-enclosed rear of the vehicle also has room for two papal aides, who can sit in the area in front of the Pope's elevated chair. The vehicle includes bulletproof glass windows and skylights and is made from reinforced armour plating, security features designed to withstand explosives under or around it. At 2011 prices, the vehicle cost approximately £345,000 (equivalent to £485,620 in 2024).

On 6 June 2007, a German man tried to jump into Benedict XVI's uncovered vehicle as the pontiff began his general audience. The Pope was not hurt and did not even appear to notice that the man had jumped over the protective barrier in the square and had grabbed onto the white Fiat the pope was in as it passed. At least eight security officers trailed the vehicle as it moved slowly through the square. They subsequently grabbed the man and wrestled him to the ground, before he was interrogated by Vatican police.

=== Usage by Francis ===
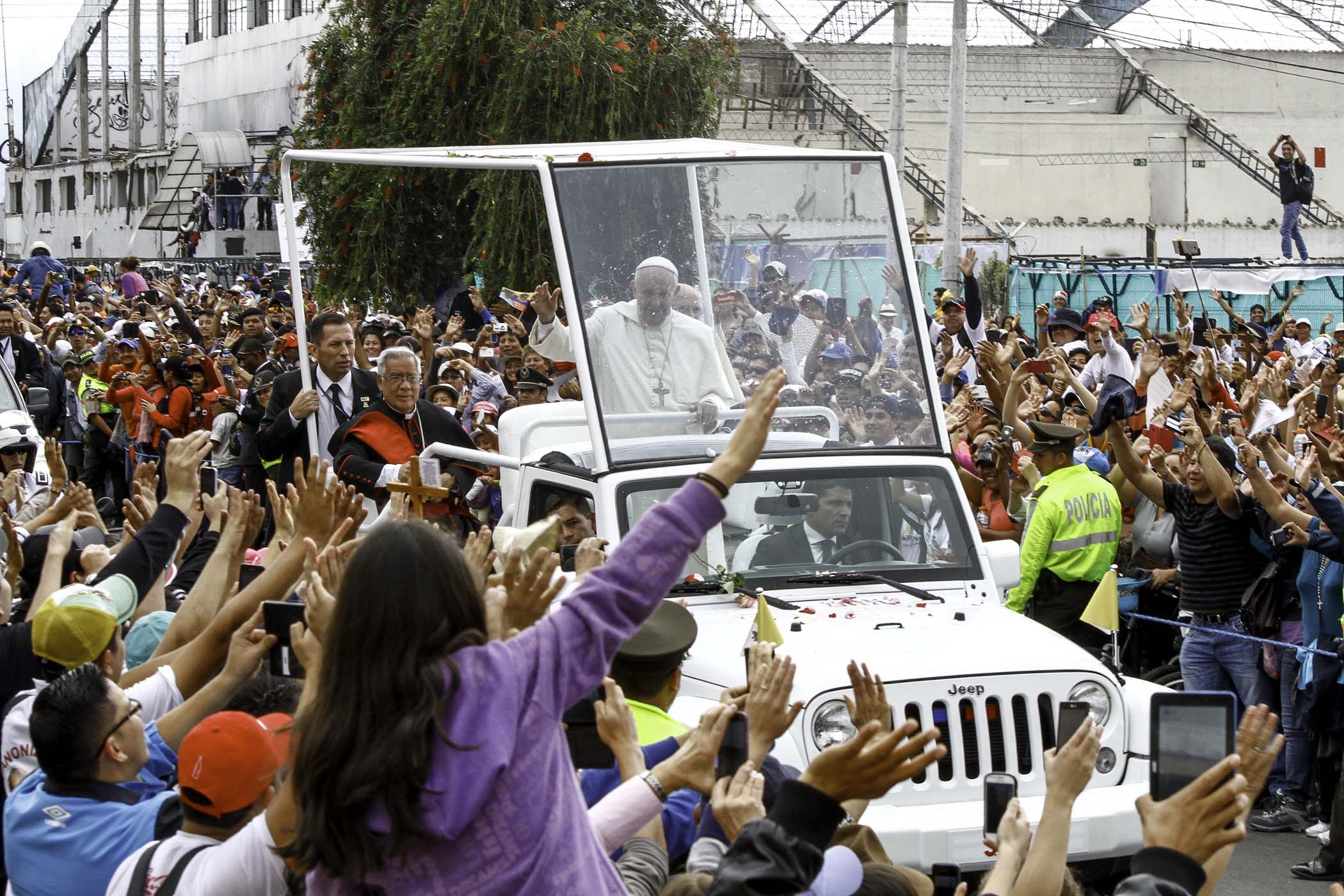
Pope Francis in a Jeep in Ecuador, 2015

Pope Francis showed a preference for a simpler lifestyle and simpler cars. As a cardinal, he often used public transport. On the night of his election, he rode with the other cardinals in a minibus back to their hotel instead of using a papal limousine. For trips within the Vatican City, he used a small Ford Focus from the Vatican motor pool. He also drove himself around the city in a 1984 Renault 4 presented to him by Italian Father Renzo Zocca.

A Kia Soul was used as the pope's method of vehicular transport in August 2014 when he visited South Korea.

Italian automaker Fiat, the traditional supplier of papal cars, supplied Pope Francis with the Fiat 500L used for his visit to the United States on 22–27 September 2015. Fiat also supplied the Jeep Wrangler he used in Ecuador in July 2015.

During his visit in the Philippines, Francis used a converted jeepney, a type of public-utility vehicle used in the country. In addition he also used an Isuzu D-Max. In 2019, Francis received a Dacia Duster to be used during his visit to Romania. For his 2024 visit in Indonesia, a Pindad Maung MV3 Tangguh was used. Francis used a Hyundai Ioniq 5 during his visit to Singapore.

In December 2024, Francis received the Vatican's first-ever all-electric vehicle, a Mercedes-Benz G-Wagen.

A vehicle used by Francis when he visited Bethlehem was later converted by Caritas Jerusalem into a mobile clinic providing medical services for Gazan children.

During his funeral in April 2025, a Ram 1500-based automobile was used to transport Francis' coffin to his burial place, the Basilica of Santa Maria Maggiore in Rome.

=== Usage by Leo XIV ===
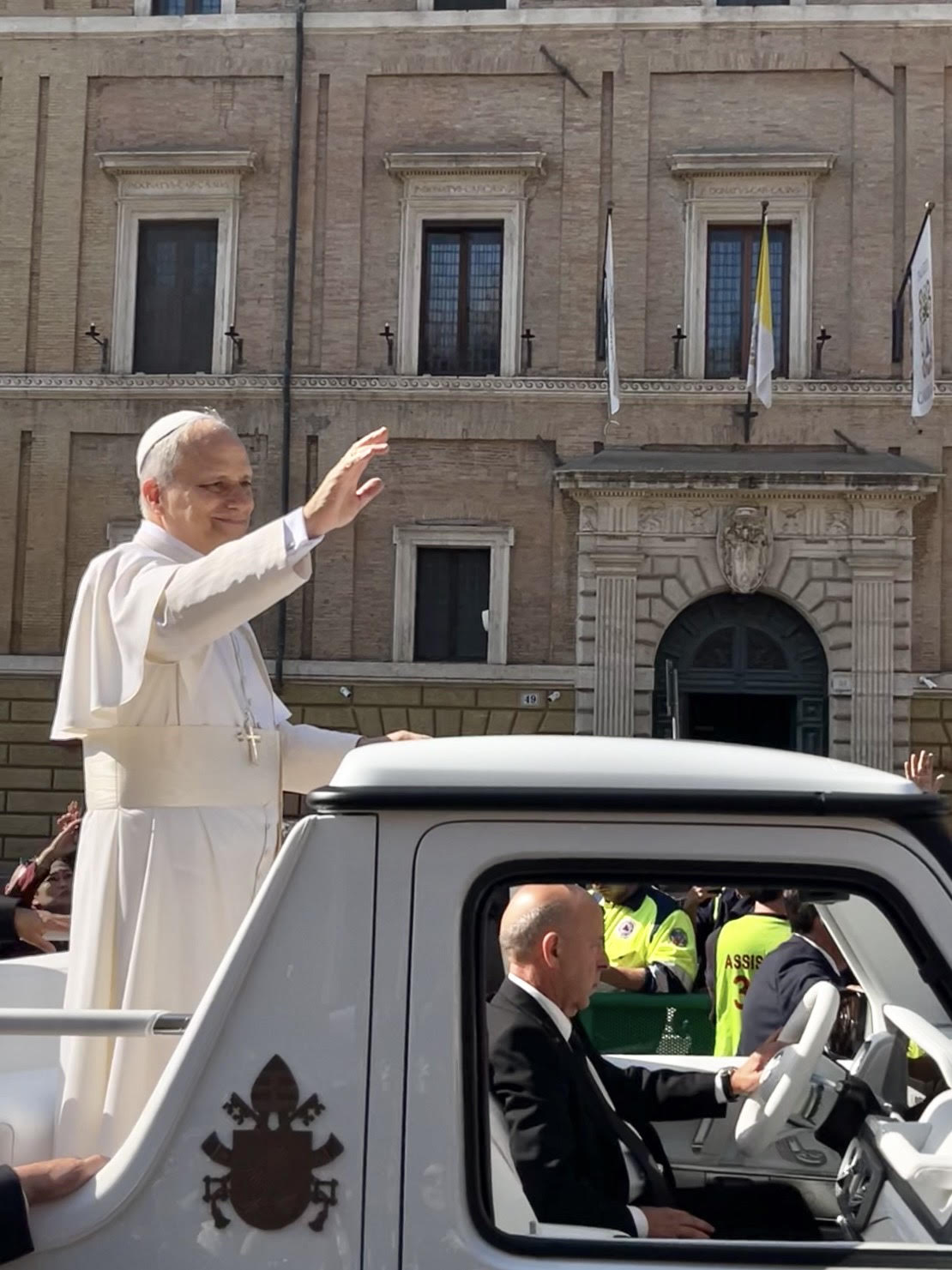
Pope Leo XIV in an open-topped Mercedes-Benz G-Class for his inauguration, May 2025

A closed-topped popemobile in use during Leo XIV's visit to Argentina in November 2026

Before his papal inauguration on 18 May 2025, Pope Leo XIV rode in an open-topped vehicle for the first time, greeting and blessing crowds gathered around St. Peter's Square and the Via della Conciliazione.

== See also ==
- Transport in Vatican City
- Index of Vatican City–related articles
