= PP-64 Wstęga =

Polish military floating bridge

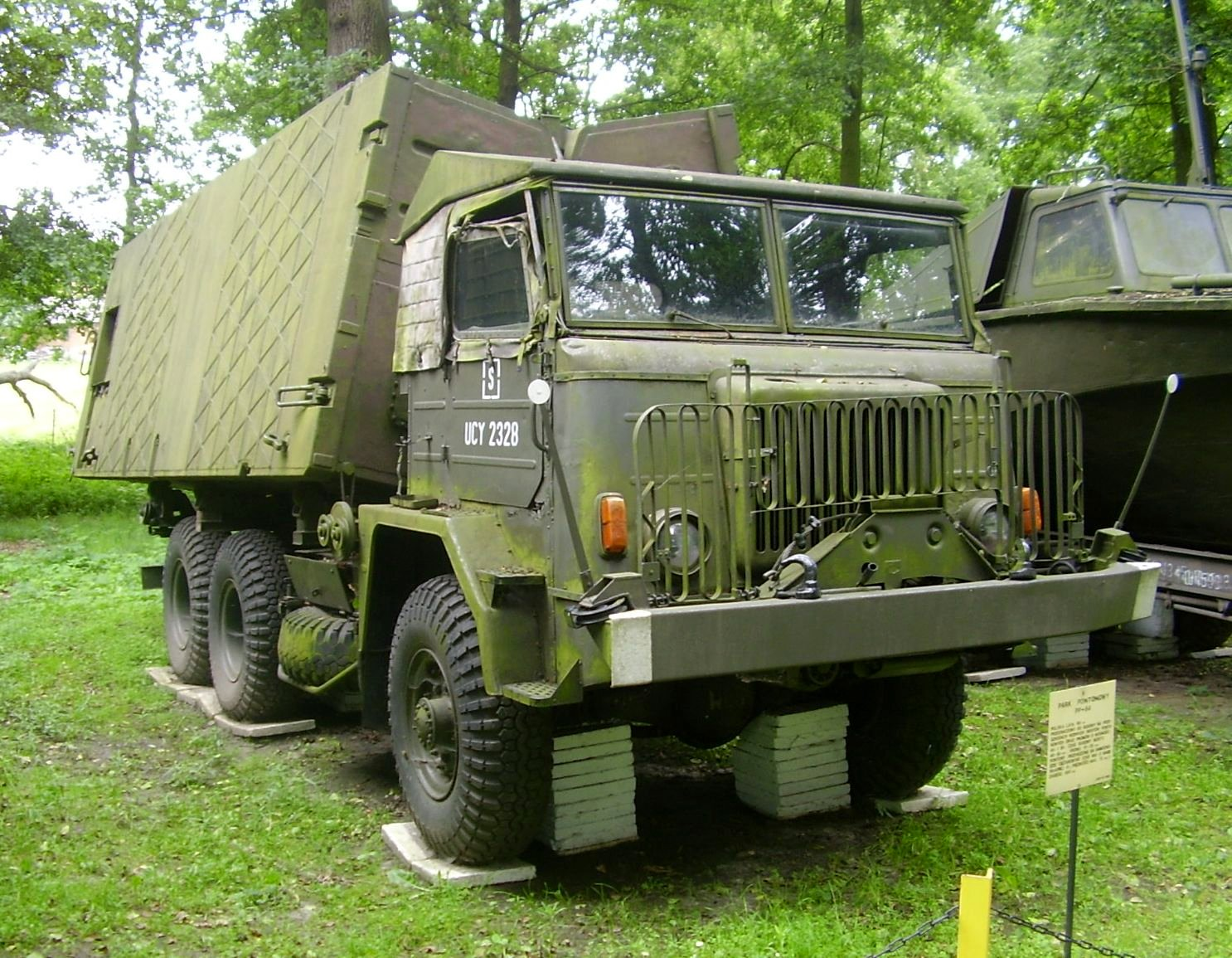
Polish Star-660 truck with PP-64 pontoons

The PP-64 Wstęga is a Polish military pontoon bridge produced since 1966. The design, based on the Soviet PMP model, commenced in 1964. The prototype was tested in 1965. Unlike PMP, rated for 60,000 kilogram load, PP-64 was rated for 40,000 kilograms, still sufficient to carry T-54/55 and T-62 main battle tanks of its period. Jane's Military Vehicles and Logistics staff supposed that PP-64 may also be capable of supporting T-64 and T-72 tanks.

PP-64 set consists of 48 truck-mounted pontoons, 12 ramps, six motor boats (carried on twin-axle truck trailers) and other equipment. KH-200 bridging boats used with PP-64 were actually put in production later, in 1971; each is capable of carrying 15 troops. The human complement in the field reaches 126 soldiers (including 60 Star 660 or Star 266 truck drivers) and 10 NCOs.

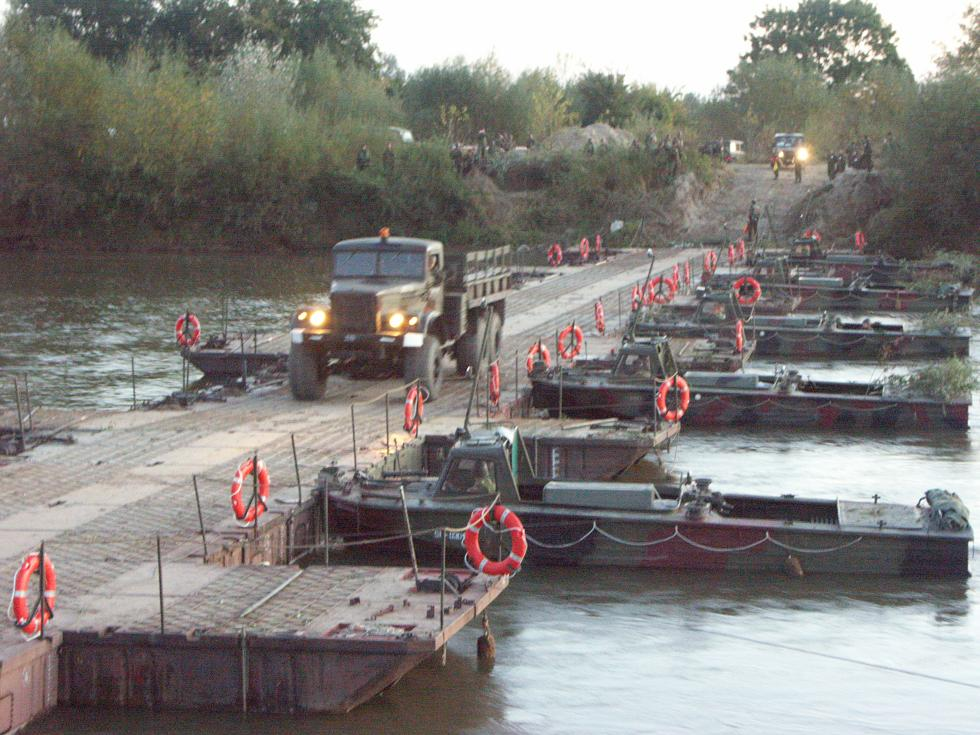
PP-64 pontoon bridge during Polish army exercises in 2005

Depending on the river flow and desired configuration, the PP-64 can be used to construct up to six different types of bridges of three possible roadway combinations, as well as numerous ferry configurations.

Type	Max length, m	Max width, m	Capacity, kg (gross/axle)	Max. river flow, m/s
Single lane	100			< 0.5
Mixed, type A				0.5-0.8
Mixed, type B	186	4.35	40,000 / 12,000	0.8-1.2
Mixed, type C				1.2-1.6
Mixed, type D	145	4.35	40,000 / 12,000	1.6-2.0
Double lane	97	8.7	80,000	>2.0

As of July, 2009, PP-64 remains in inventory of the Polish Armed Forces.

== Sources ==
- "PP-64 heavy folding pontoon bridge (Poland), Tactical floating bridges and ferries". Jane's Military Vehicles and Logistics. Jane's Information Group. April 28, 2009.
- "KH-200 bridging boat (Poland), Bridging boats". Jane's Military Vehicles and Logistics. Jane's Information Group. May 5, 2009.
- Zbigniew Bursztynowski (1986). Mosty pływające typu wstęgi [Lane-type pontoon floating bridges] (in Polish). Warsaw: Wojskowa Akademia Techniczna. p. 190.
