= Star 660 =

Polish 6x6 truck

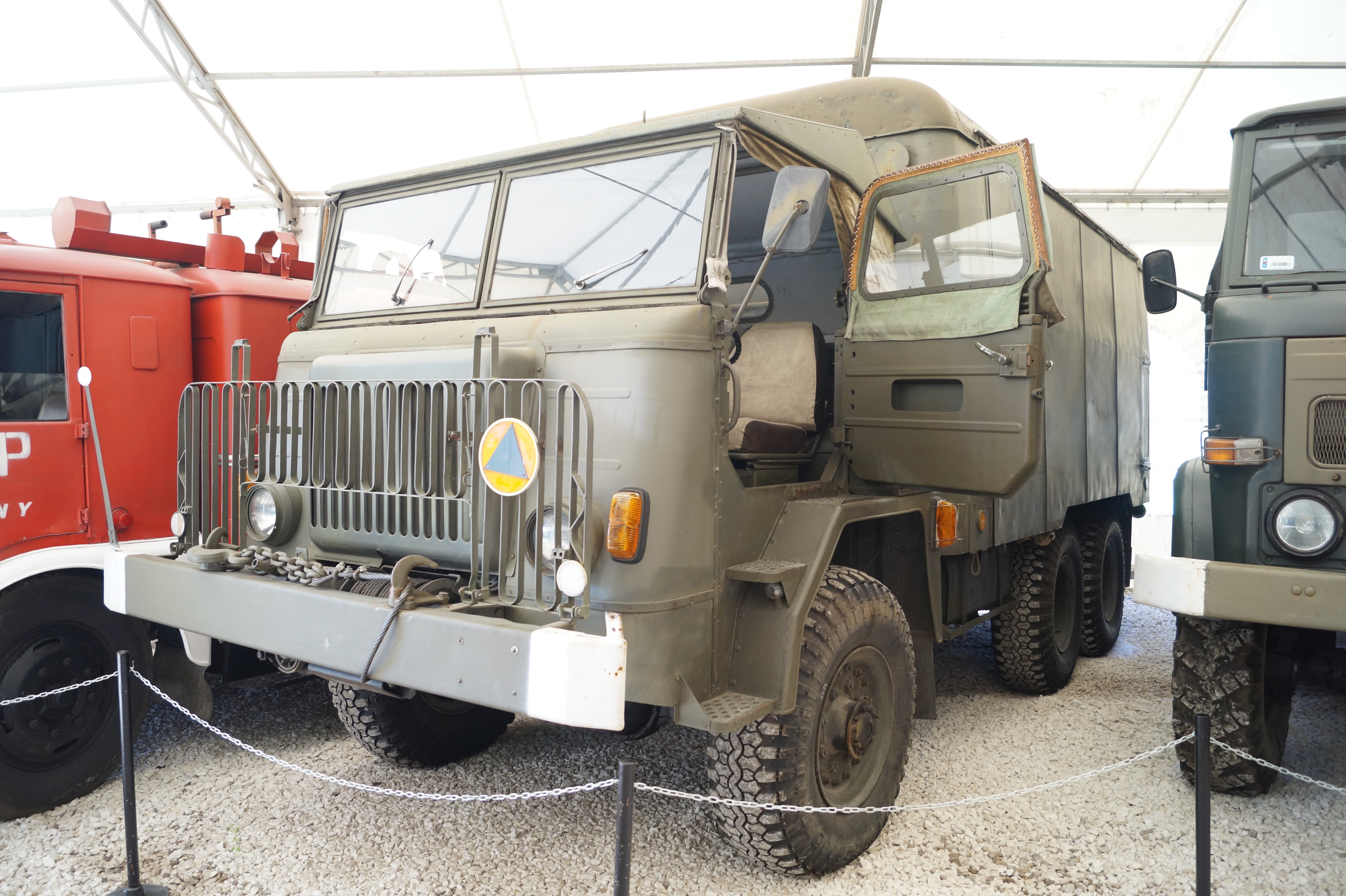

Overview
- Manufacturer: FSC Star
- Production: 1965-1983
- Assembly: Poland

Body and chassis
- Class: 6x6 Truck

Powertrain
- Engine: 4,6L S47 inline 6; 6,2L S530A inline 6; 6,8L S359 inline 6
- Transmission: 5-speed manual

Dimensions
- Length: 6528 mm
- Width: 2400 mm
- Height: 2875 mm
- Curb weight: 5300 kg (660M1); 5650 kg (660M2)

Chronology
- Predecessor: Star 66
- Successor: Star 266

The Star 660 is a Polish 6x6 truck designed for transport of cargo and personnel. Created by Starachowice-based FSC Star, it was the basic transport truck used by the Polish People's Army. It was replaced by the Star 266.

== History ==
This model is a modernization of the Star 66 truck produced since 1958. As a result of the experience gathered and the army's comments on the operation of the 66 model, it was decided to modernize and better adapt this vehicle to perform the tasks it was assigned. Design work on the modernized model began in the early 1960s at the Automotive Industry Design Office in Warsaw and the FSC Star Design Office. The effects of the design offices' work were presented in 1962. Due to the lack of technical and financial capabilities of the Starachowice plant, it was decided to carry out the process of implementing new design solutions in two stages.

Production of the modernized model, designated Star 660M1, began in 1965. The vehicle body was mounted on a welded longitudinal frame made of pressed sheet metal. The chassis featured a front rigid drive axle suspended on semi-elliptical leaf springs and two hydraulic arm shock absorbers. The suspension of the middle and rear axles consisted of drive axles, each suspended on two inverted semi-elliptical leaf springs and six reaction rods. The drive axles were equipped with a pneumatically controlled differential lock. The braking system was adapted to supply the trailer brakes and was equipped with an overpressure power steering system. The Star 660M1 was powered by a Polish, 6-cylinder, in-line petrol engine type S47, with a displacement of 4680 cm^{3} and a maximum power of 77.3 kW (105 HP). The drive unit was locked with a 5-speed manual, non-synchronised gearbox, connected via a tubular shaft with a mechanically controlled two-speed reducer. Additionally, the gearbox was integrated with a power take-off enabling the transfer of power to external devices. The Star 660M1 was equipped with an open, two-person N66-type wagon cabin with a tarpaulin roof that folded backwards and a two-part windscreen.

In 1968, this model was modernized. The modernized vehicle, designated Star 660M2, used a metal-tarpaulin roof structure for the cabin, improving thermal and acoustic insulation, and the shape of the engine cover and gear shift lever were changed. The changes also affected the vehicle's electrical installation by shielding it, adapting it to work when completely flooded, so that the vehicle could overcome deeper water obstacles and be dragged along the bottom. The braking system was equipped with an increased power steering pump capacity and a trailer braking system control valve.

In the same year, the Star 660D model was introduced into production. This version was powered by a 6-cylinder, in-line diesel engine of the S530A type, with a displacement of 6230 cm^{3} and a maximum power of 73.6 kW (100 HP). From 1970, a more powerful diesel engine of the S359 type with direct fuel injection with a displacement of 6840 cm^{3} and a power of 110 kW (150 HP) was also used.

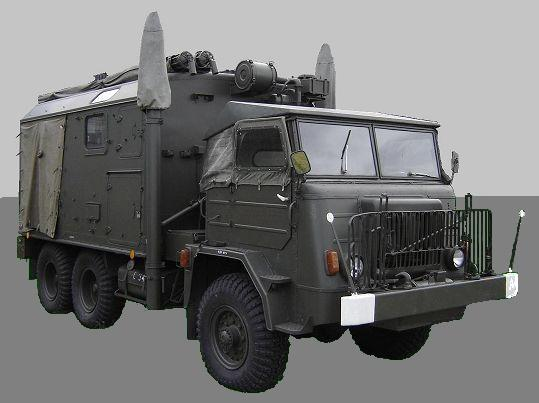
Star 660 with R-137B radio station

Despite the introduction of the new off-road truck Star 266 into production in 1973, production of models of the Star 660 family continued until 1983.

On the chassis of the Star 660 model and its derivatives, various versions of superstructures were mounted, such as the GBM 2/8 (firetruck), 117 AUM type van body, the Hydros R-061 or ŻSH-6S truck crane, the K-407B excavators, the R-118, R-137 and R-140 radio stations, the R-404 and R-405 radio link stations, the 750 Sarna type repair bodies, the AP-64 type bodies for transporting pontoon blocks, the BP-64 type bodies for transporting coastal blocks of pontoon parks or the SMT-1 accompanying bridge.

A total of 13,760 Star 660 vehicles were delivered to the Polish Army.

== Post-production development ==
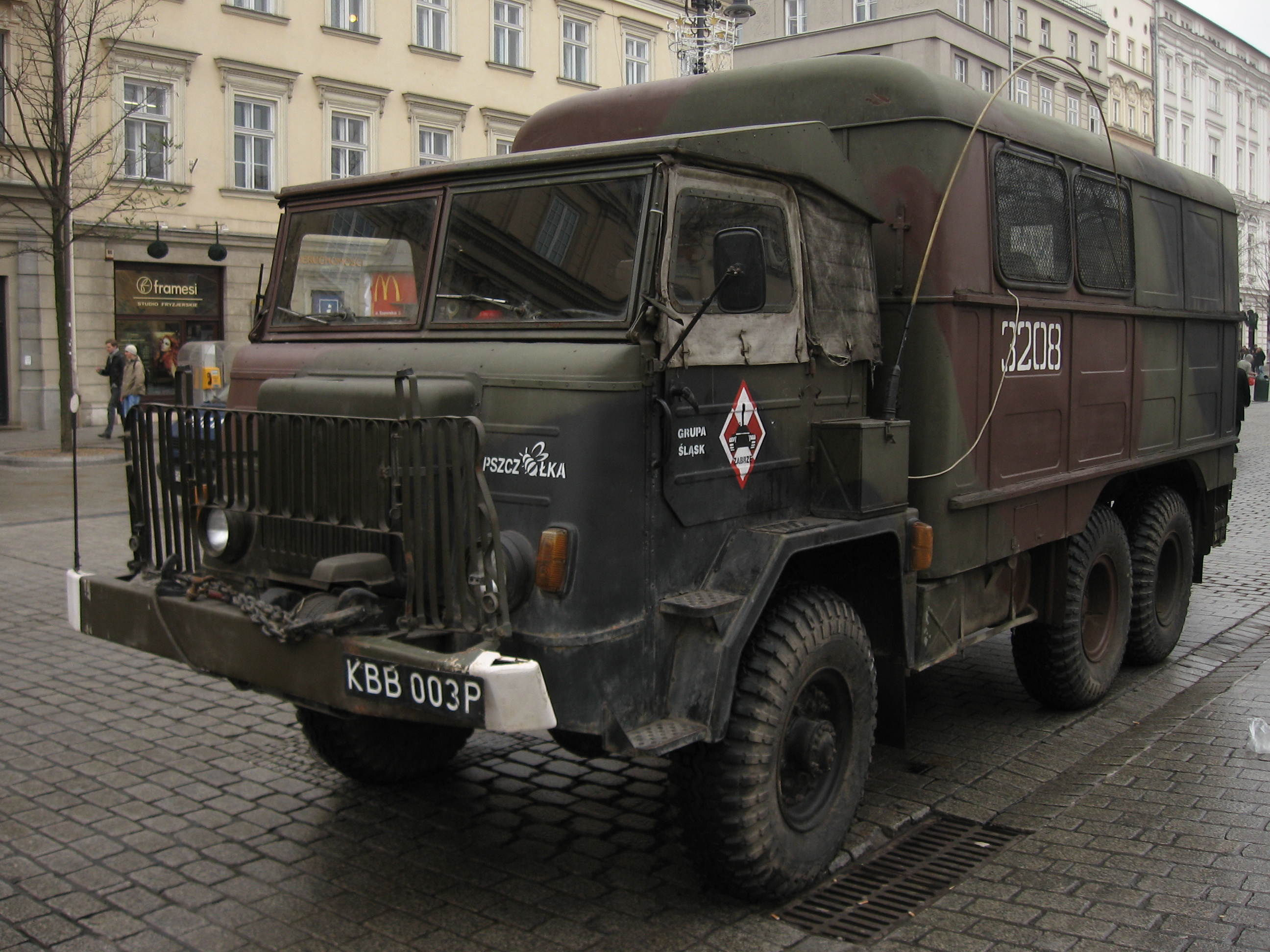
Star 660-based staff vehicle

In 2000, the modernization of the Star 660 was proposed by the AMZ Głowno company, as a result of which about 100 trucks of the Polish Army were rebuilt by various entities to the Star 660M3P version. Its main element was the replacement of the engine with a modern IVECO 8140SRC20 turbodiesel with a capacity of 2.8 l, maximum power of 122 HP (90 kW) and maximum torque of 285 Nm. In addition, a ZF steering gear with hydraulic power steering, a dual-circuit braking system with power steering and a 24 V electrical installation were used. Despite the use of a moderately powerful engine from an Iveco Daily delivery van, this modernization improved the vehicle's parameters. Subsequently, approximately 20 vehicles were modernised to the Star 660M3 variant by WZM in Siemianowice Śląskie, which fitted an IVECO engine with a maximum power of 170 HP (125 kW) and a maximum torque of 550 Nm.

== Star 660 Popemobile ==
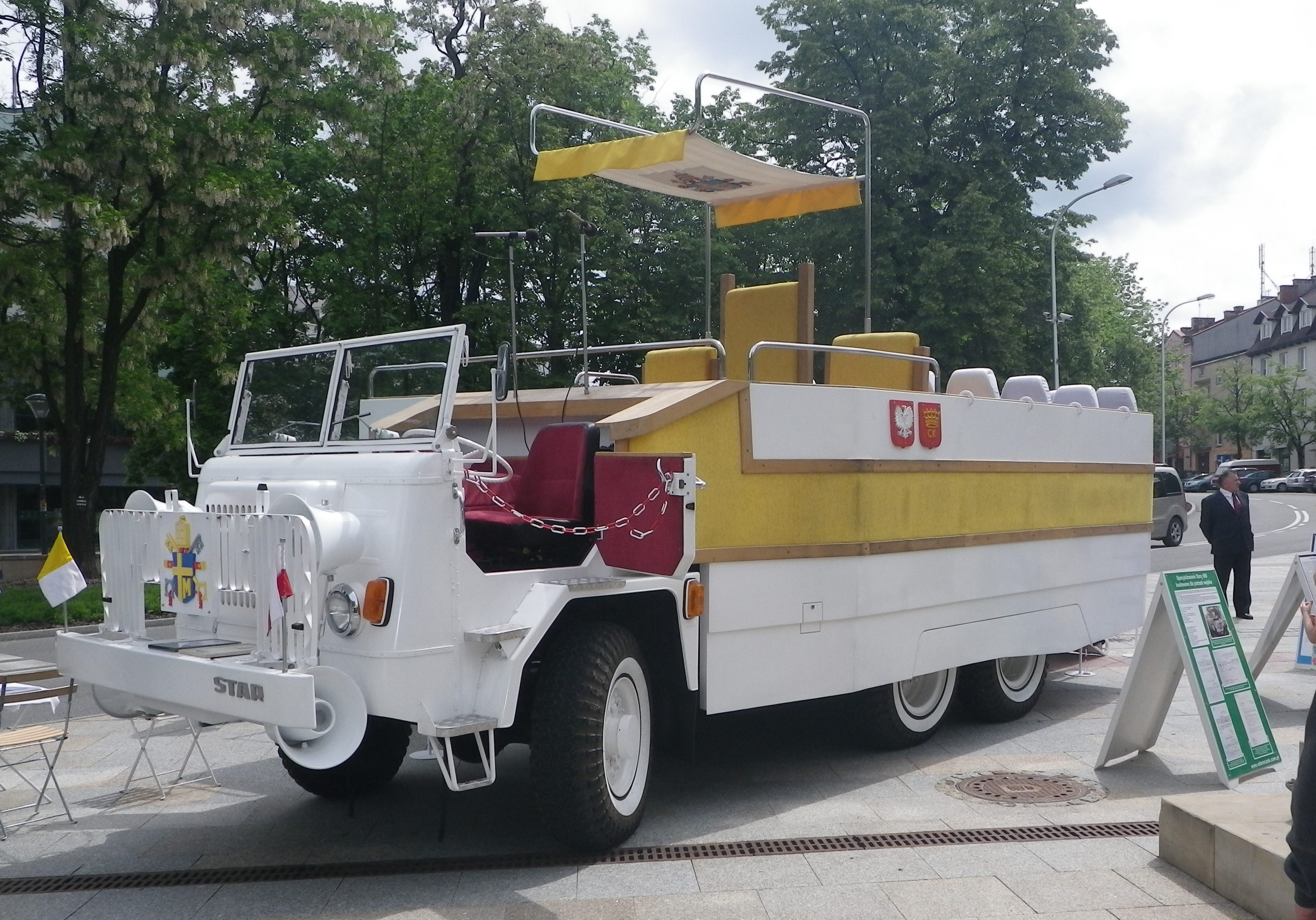
Star 660 popemobile

Before the first pilgrimage of Pope John Paul II to Poland, the Pope requested to be transported in a Polish-made vehicle. In April 1979, the order for the Popemobile was received by the Industrial Automotive Institute in Warsaw. The heads of the undertaking decided that the car would be made on the chassis of the Star 660. Two copies were built in a month and a half in case one of them broke down.

After the end of the Holy Father's visit, the aim of the communist authorities of Poland was to erase the traces of the vehicle, which could have become an object of worship. The gondola was dismantled and destroyed, while the chassis together with the cabin were transported to FSC in Starachowice, from where it was sold after a short time in October 1979 to the State Agricultural Farm in Główczyce. The truck was used there until the early 2000s.

In 2006, a group of enthusiasts undertook to build a replica on the discovered, original chassis.

Help was provided by people who had worked on the construction of the Popemobile 27 years earlier - fabric patterns were obtained, the canopy and umbrellas were recreated, identical seats were found, with the help of PKS in Ostrowiec Świętokrzyski S.A. and a company from Wąchock sewing covers.

In 2008, work on the replica was completed. Today, this famous Popemobile is on permanent display at the Starachowice museum, and sometimes sets off on new "pilgrimages", honoring various celebrations with its presence.

== Gallery ==
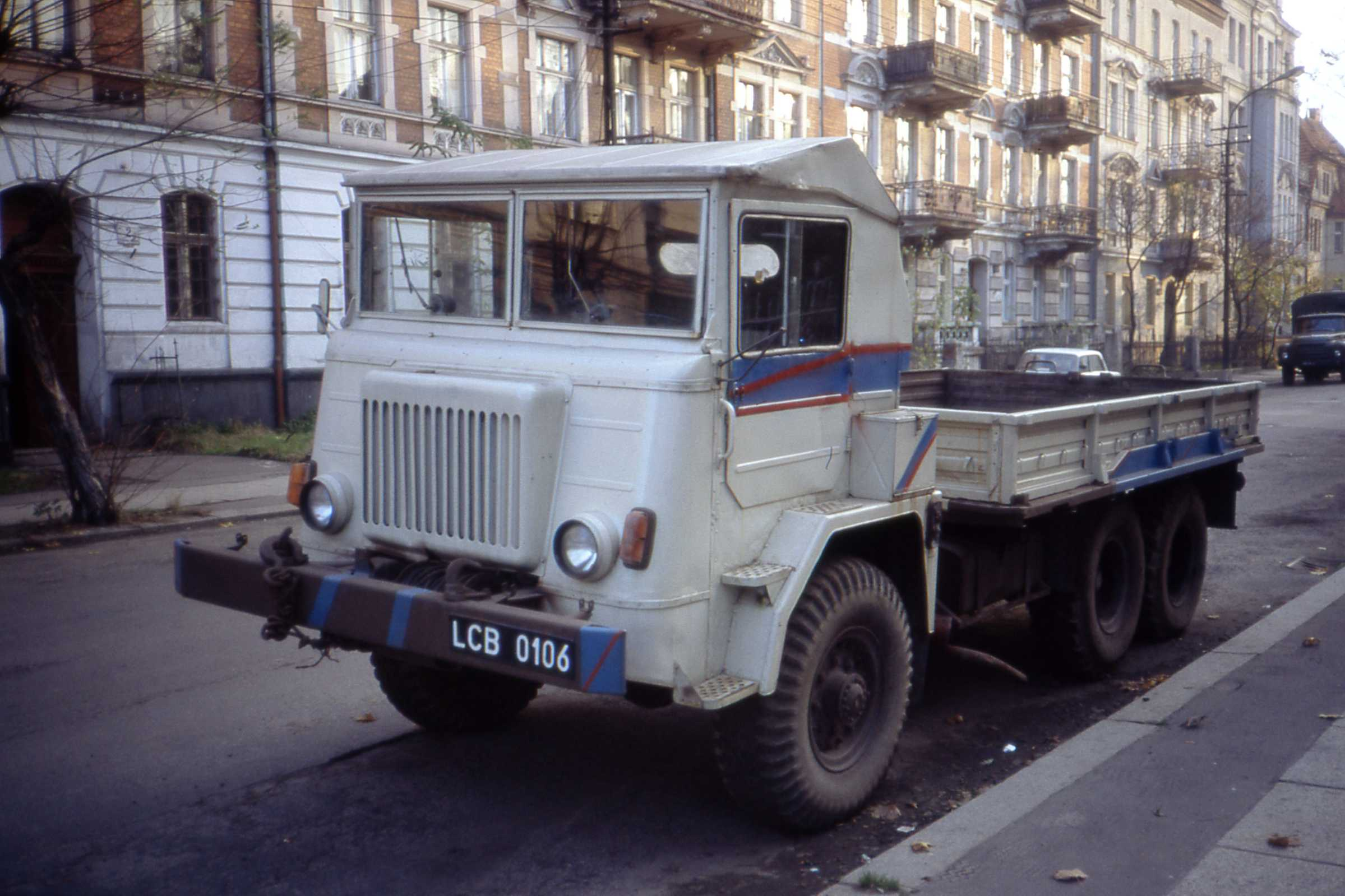
Star 660 in civilian use.

Star 660-based crane.

Star 660-based army crane

Star 660 firetruck

Star 660 used for hauling timber

Side view of the Star 660 silhouette

Star 660-based army radar

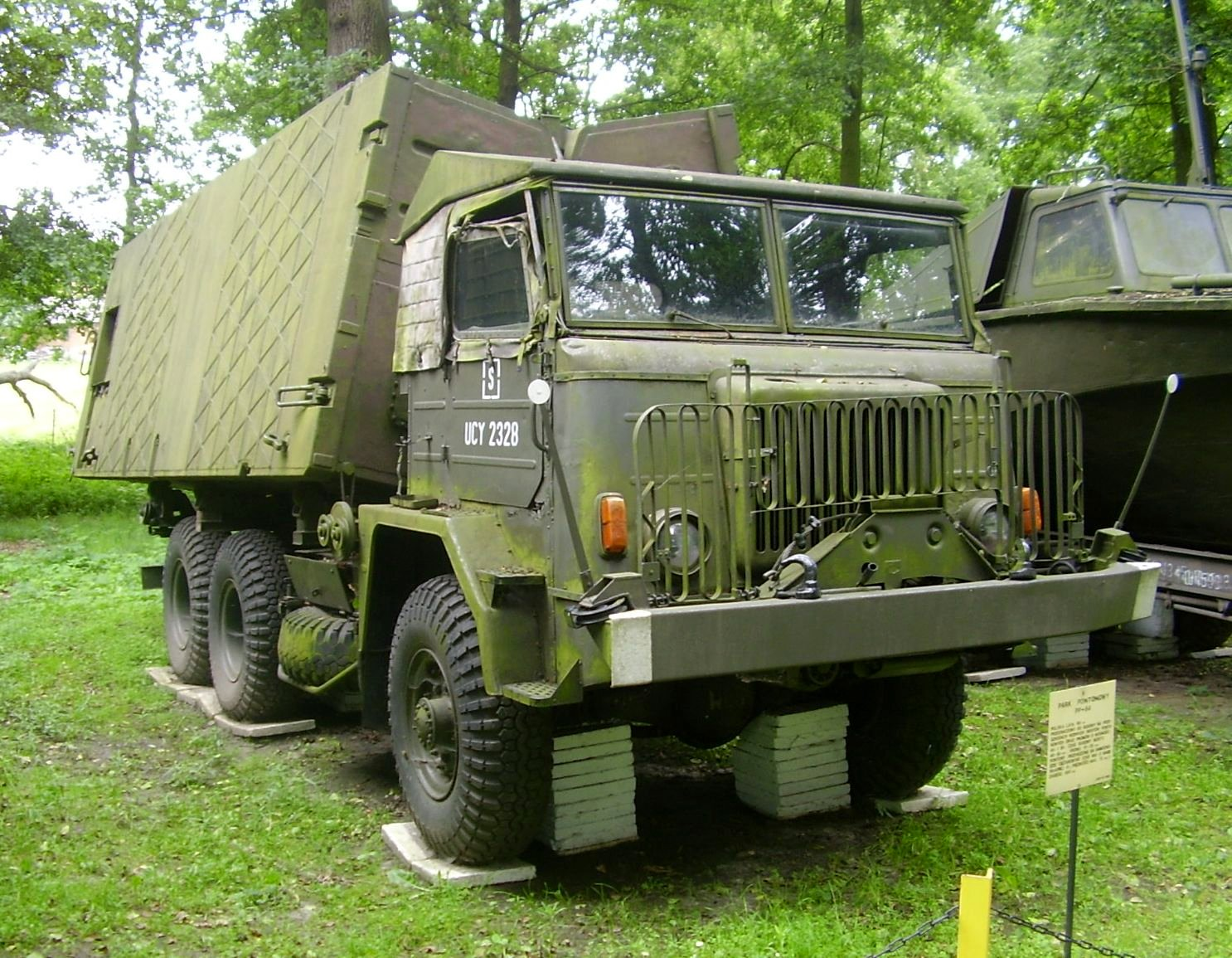
PP-64
