= Vatican City Heliport =

Vatican City Heliport Portus helicopterorum Civitatis Vaticanae
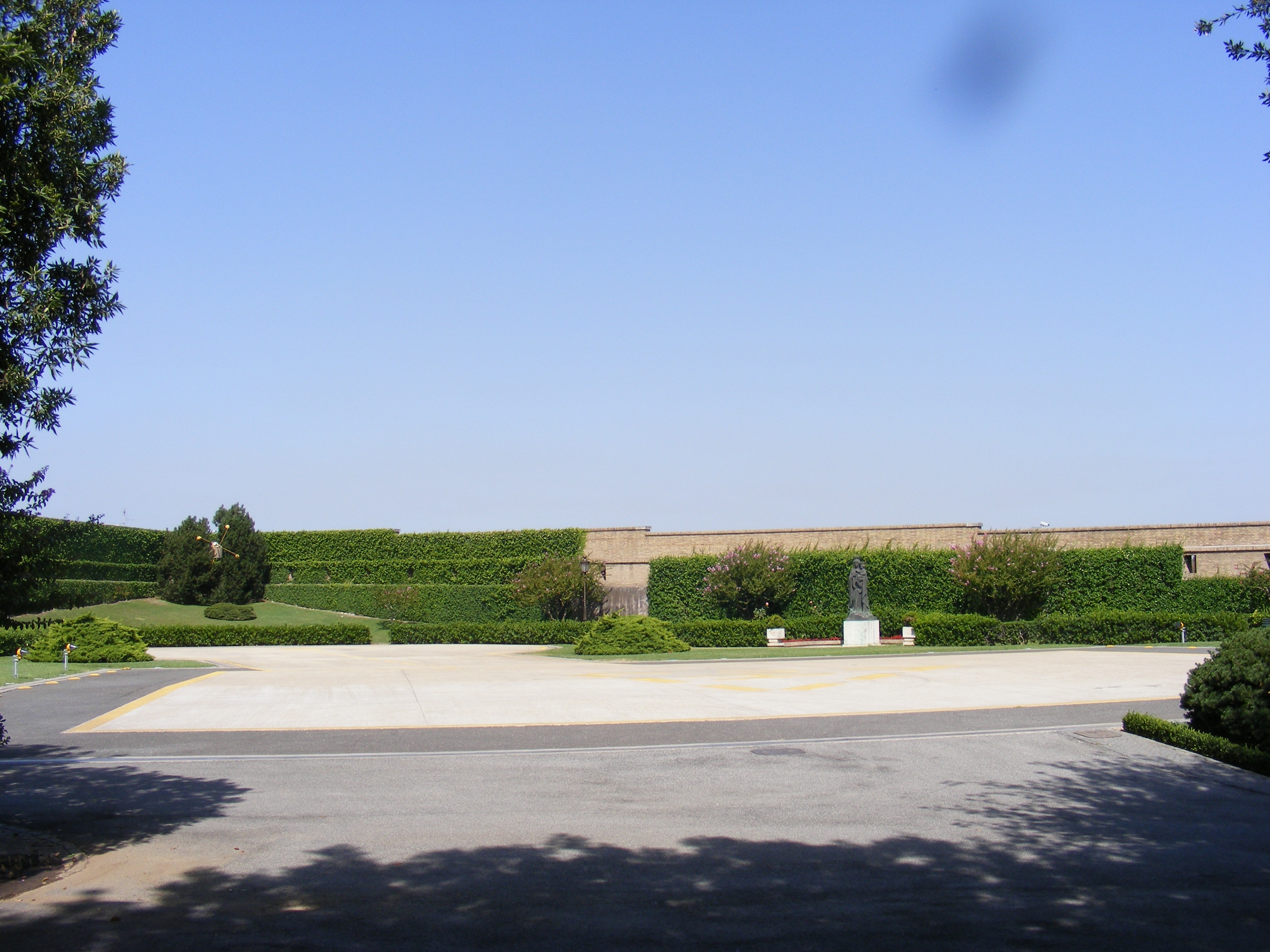
- Daytime view of Vatican City Heliport, looking west
- IATA: none; ICAO: none

Summary
- Owner/Operator: State of Vatican City
- Serves: Vatican City
- Location: Vatican Gardens, Vatican City
- Hub for: Papal Helicopter Flights
- Time zone: CET (UTC+01:00)
  - Summer (DST): CEST (UTC+02:00)
- Elevation AMSL: 75 m (246 ft)
- Coordinates: 41.9020°N 12.4465°E

Maps
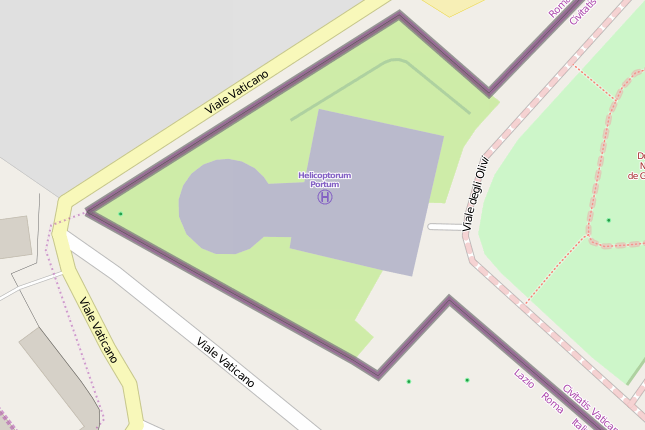
- Map showing heliport in Vatican City

- Location on a map of Vatican City

Helipads
Number	Length		Surface
Number	m	ft	Surface
	25 × 17	82 × 56	Concrete

Vatican City Heliport (Latin: Portus helicopterorum Civitatis Vaticanae, Italian: Eliporto di Città del Vaticano) consists of a 25 × 17 m (82 × 56 ft) rectangular concrete landing area linked with a circular parking area. It is used for short journeys from or to Vatican City by the pope and visiting heads of state. The heliport is the only aviation facility within Vatican City, making all helicopter flights technically international flights.

== Structure ==
The heliport is at 75 m (246 ft) above sea level, in the French-style portion of the Vatican Gardens, and is referred to also as a helipad. It is situated in the westernmost bastion of the Leonine Wall, which marks the westernmost point of Vatican City State.

== History ==
It was constructed in 1976 under Pope Paul VI (1963–1978), facilitating transfers between Vatican City and the summer papal residence at Castel Gandolfo for occasions such as the regular Wednesday general audience, when travel by car could take a couple of hours each way and would cause inconvenience to other road users.

In 1978, Pope John Paul II had a bronze statue representing Our Lady of Częstochowa placed nearby.

In 2011, Pope Benedict XVI took a direct flight from the Vatican City Heliport to the Torraccia Airfield in the San Marino, and back to the Vatican City Heliport later that day. Making it the first direct international flight from Vatican City to a country besides Italy.

In 2026, Pope Leo XIV took a direct flight from the Vatican City Heliport to the Monaco Heliport in the Principality of Monaco, and back to the Vatican City Heliport later that day. Pope Leo XIV also visited San Marino by direct helicopter flight from the Vatican City Heliport in 2026.

== Operation ==
Flights are conducted only in visual meteorological conditions by visual flight rules.

For most pastoral visits within Italy, papal flights are onboard a helicopter and use the heliport. One exception was the pope's 2026 visit to Lampedusa.

Worldwide publicity was given to the heliport on the afternoon of 28 February 2013, when Pope Benedict XVI departed Vatican City for Castel Gandolfo mere hours before his resignation took effect.

Since 2015, the heliport also serves—in urgent cases—the Bambino Gesù Hospital to transport patients, personnel, and medical equipment.

The helicopter used for the pope is an AgustaWestland AW139 of the Italian Air Force.

== See also ==
- Index of Vatican City-related articles
- Transport in Vatican City
