= Transport in Vatican City =

Description of the transport system in Vatican City

Coordinates: 41°54′3″N 12°27′4″E

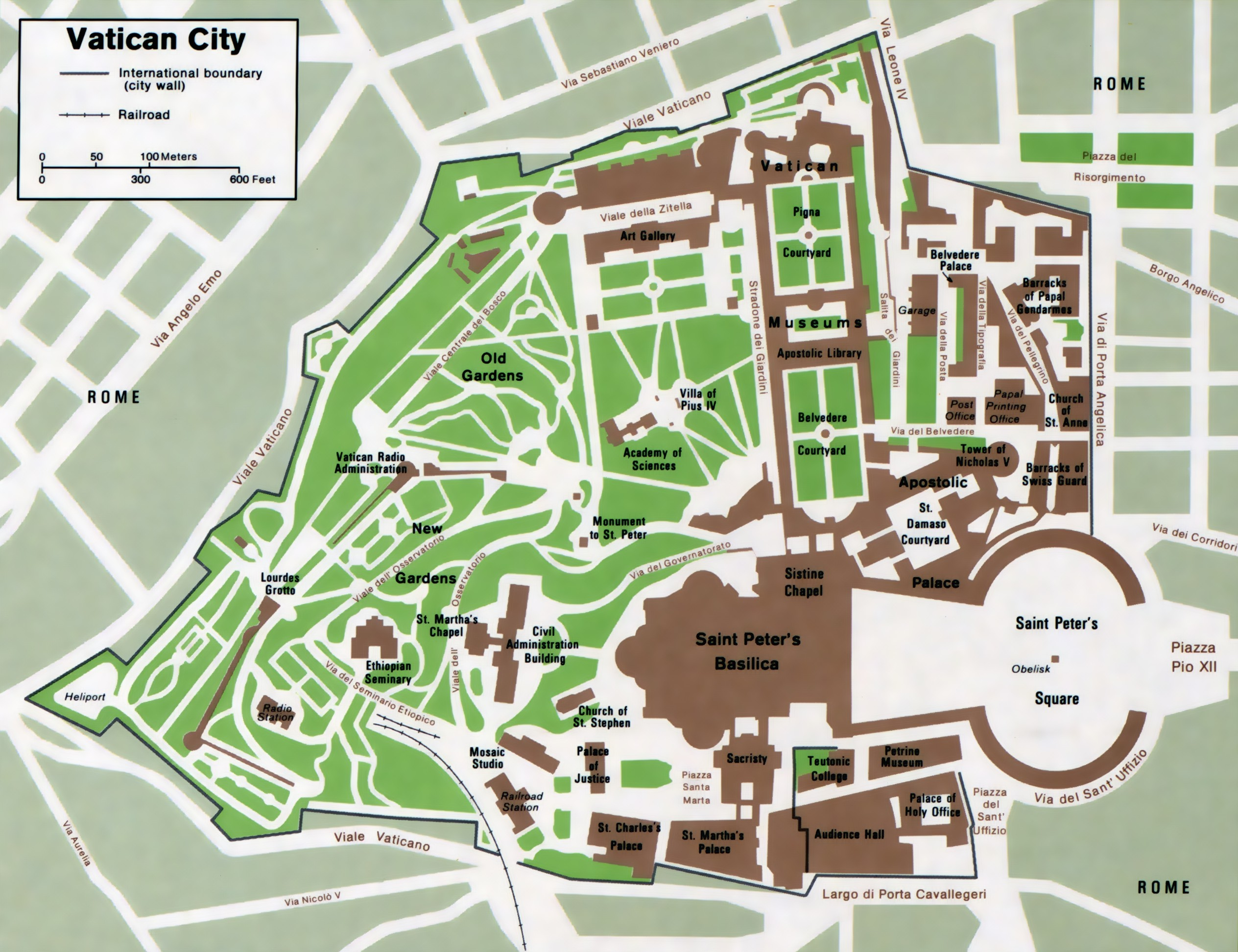
(Select to enlarge.)

The transportation system in Vatican City, a country 1.05 km (0.65 mi) long and 0.85 km (0.53 mi) wide, is a small transportation system with no airports or highways. There is no public transport in the country. A heliport and a short railway are used for special occasions only. Most visitors will walk from a nearby Italian bus or train stop, or car parking. Given an average walking speed of 3.6 km/h (2.2 mph), Vatican City can be crossed in 20 minutes or less. Thus, much of the infrastructure in the Vatican consists of St. Peter's Square itself, hallways and aisles in the basilica and surrounding buildings, and walkways behind and between the buildings. The Vatican City Heliport is in the western corner of the city-state, and is used only for officials of the Holy See and official visitors.

== Air transport ==
Vatican City is served by Vatican City Heliport, sometimes used by official visitors. There is no public airport and visitors may use the two airports of Rome: Fiumicino (Leonardo da Vinci) Airport and Ciampino Airport.

Fiumicino Airport, established in the 1960s, is located approximately 30 kilometers from Vatican City and is the primary international gateway to Rome. Ciampino Airport, originally a military airfield, has served as a civilian airport since the 1970s and is situated about 20 kilometers from Vatican City. Both airports are connected to the Vatican with various transportation options.

== Railway transport ==
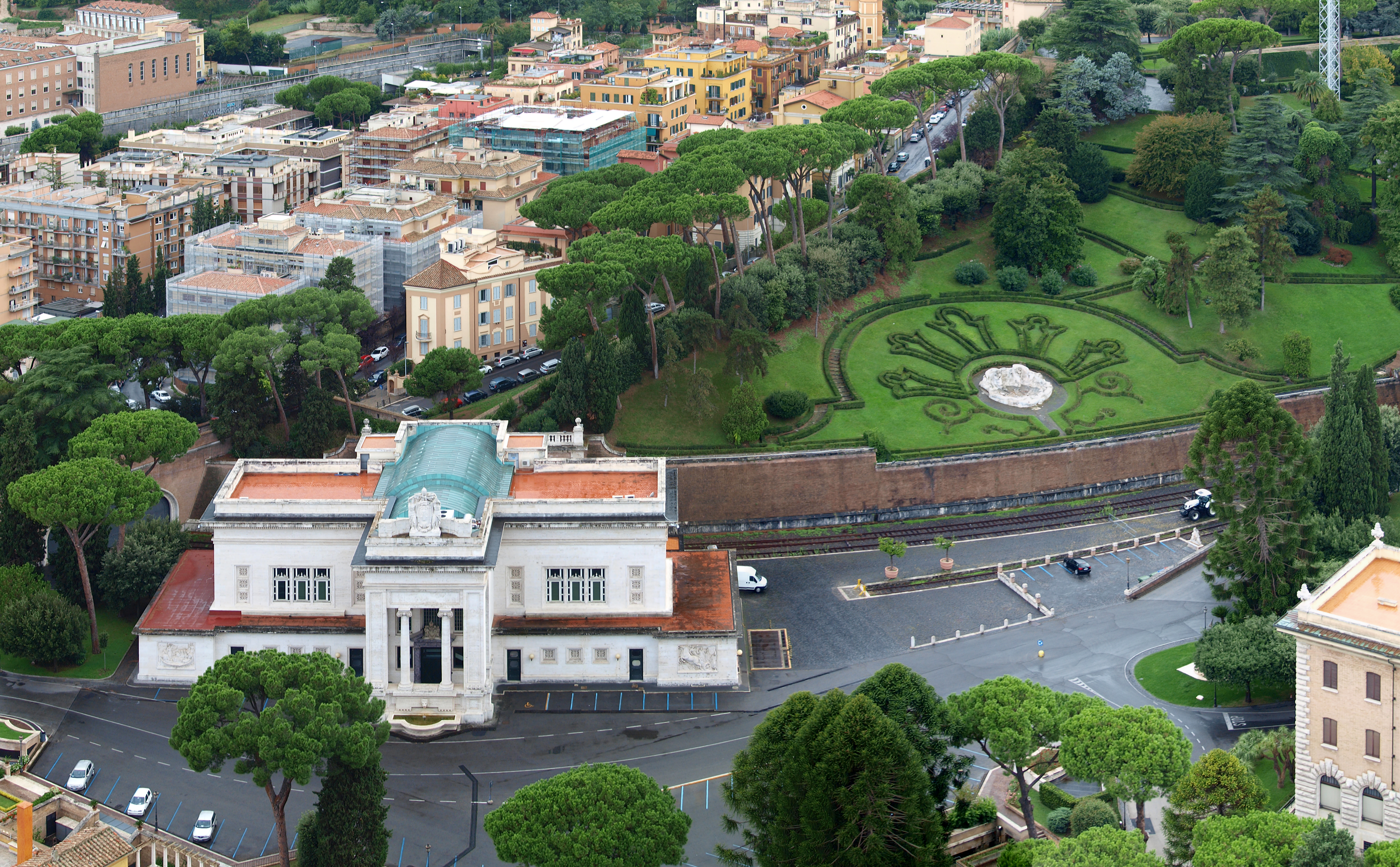
Vatican City railway station

Vatican City is accessible by rail through nearby stations. The closest rail station to Vatican City is Roma San Pietro, located outside the Vatican walls. This station is served by the FL5 regional train line and connects to Roma Termini and other locations in Rome, as well as to the coastal city of Civitavecchia. It is also served by Rome Metro Line A, with the Ottaviano and Cipro-Musei Vaticani stations located a ten-minute short walk from the city-state. The Risorgimento / San Pietro tram station also serves the Vatican area on the 19 tram route.

== Road transport ==
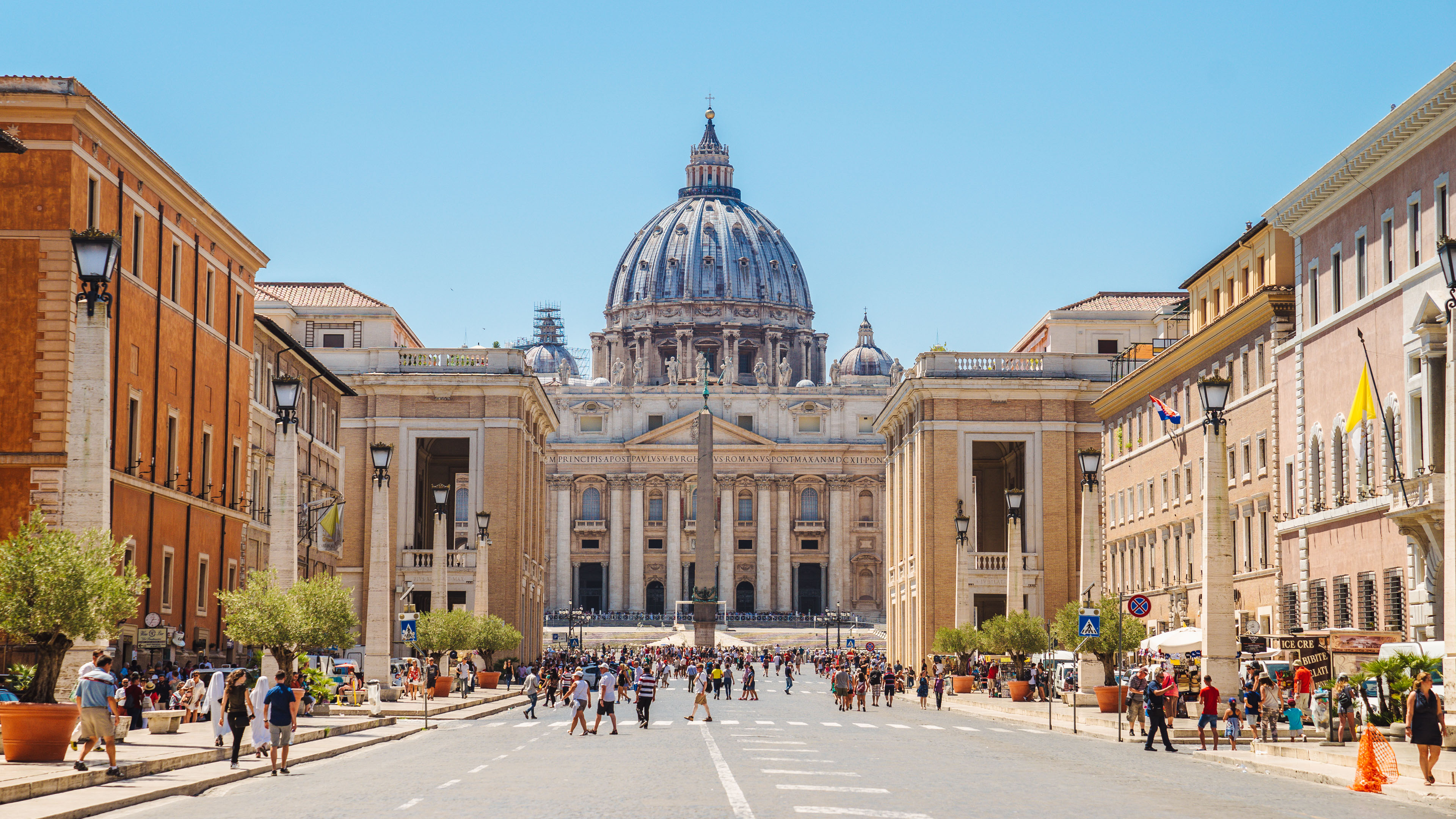
Mussolini demolished medieval housing and churches to create Via della Conciliazione leading into St. Peter's Square.

The area is served by Rome’s extensive public transport network, including buses, taxis and private transfer. ATAC buses, such as Bus 40 (connecting Roma Termini to Piazza Pia near St. Peter’s Basilica) and Bus 64 (connecting central Rome to San Pietro Station), pass close to Vatican City. Also, more direct transportation, licensed taxis and private transfer are readily available throughout Rome.

== See also ==
- Index of Vatican City-related articles
- Popemobile
- Vatican Railway Station
- Lateran Treaty
- Transport in Rome
- Holy See
