= Transport in Rome =

Roman public transit

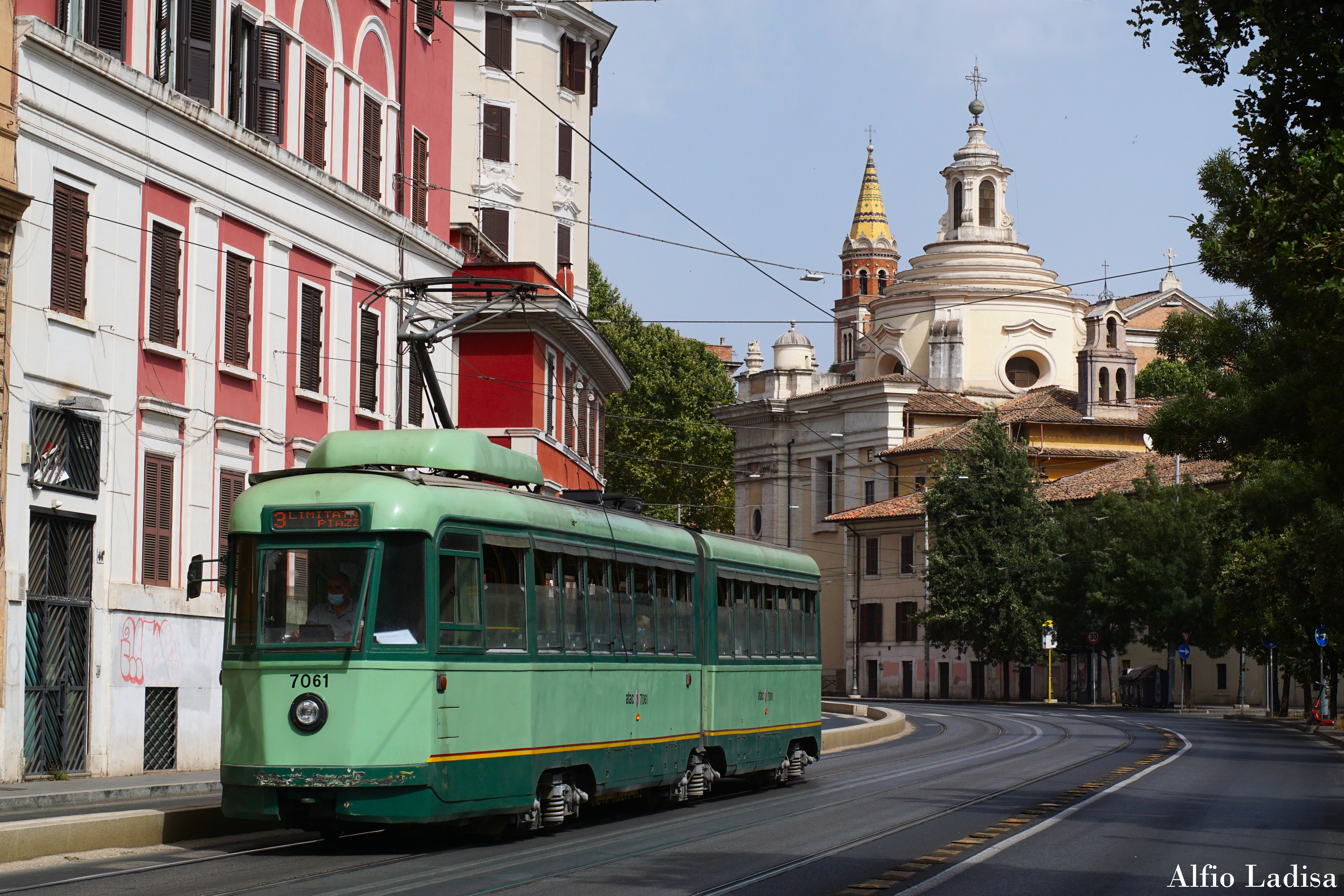
- Typical old Roman tram

Overview
- Locale: Rome, Lazio
- Transit type: Rapid transit, commuter rail, light rail, buses, trolleybuses, trams, private automobile, taxicab, bicycle, pedestrian

Operation
- Operators: ATAC, Cotral, Trenitalia

Rome has an extensive internal transport system and is one of the most important road, rail and air hubs in Italy.

Rome banned diesel vehicles from its roads for the first time on Tuesday 14 January 2020. The local transport authority said the order would affect around one million vehicles.

== Urban transport ==
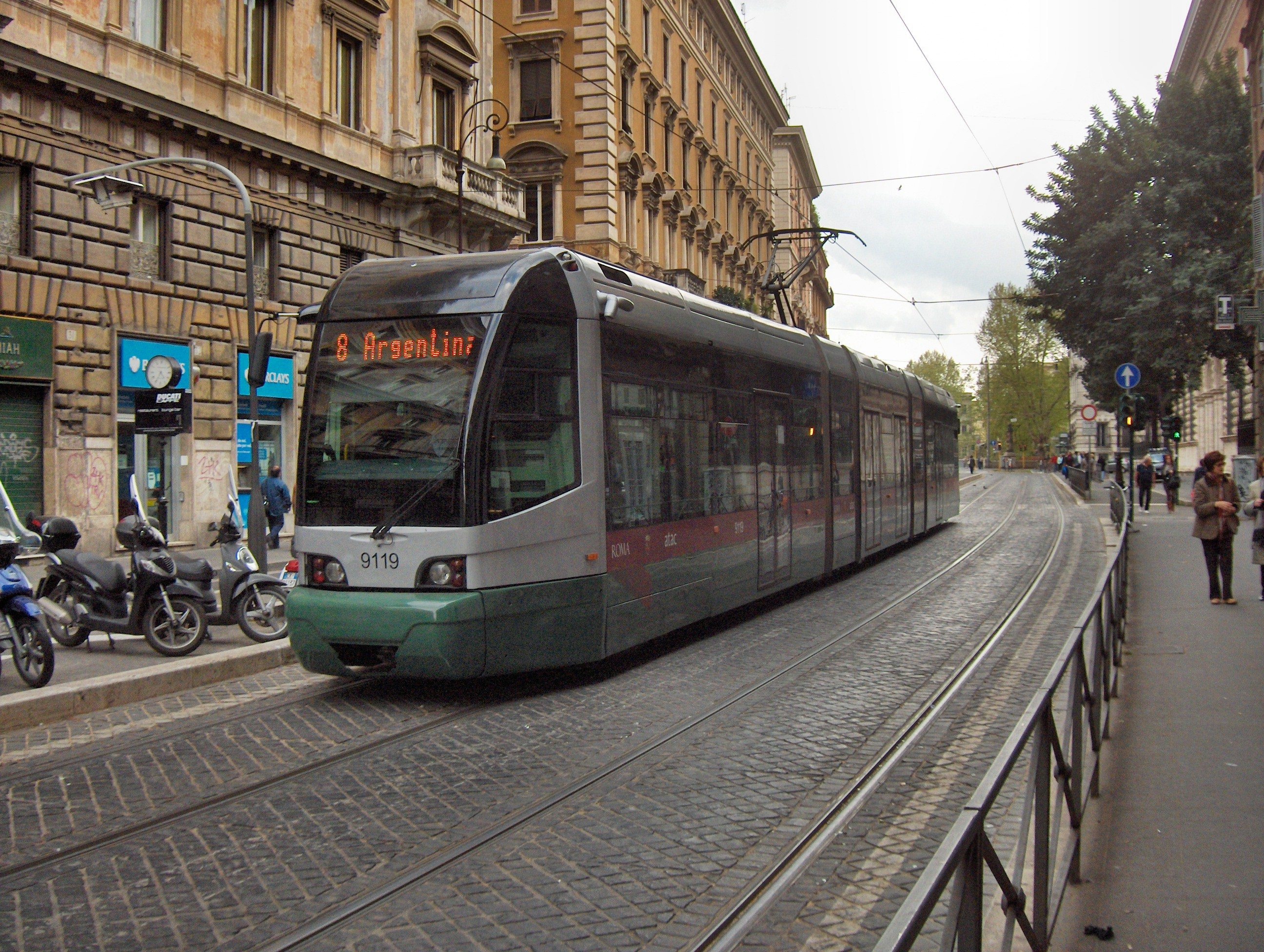
Tram approaching Teatro Argentina in Via Arenula

Rome has an urban transport network which consists of buses, trams, rapid transit lines, light rail lines and suburban railways.

Roma servizi per la Mobilità is the municipally owned public transport agency which is in charge of programming bus routes and providing real-time information and services to the user.

Atac (formerly an acronym for Azienda del Trasporto Autoferrotranviario del Comune di Roma, "Company for rail and road transport of the city of Rome") is the municipally owned public transport company which operates most of the public transport lines in the city.

Roma TPL is a private company which operates a minority of bus lines.

=== Rome Metro ===
Metro map

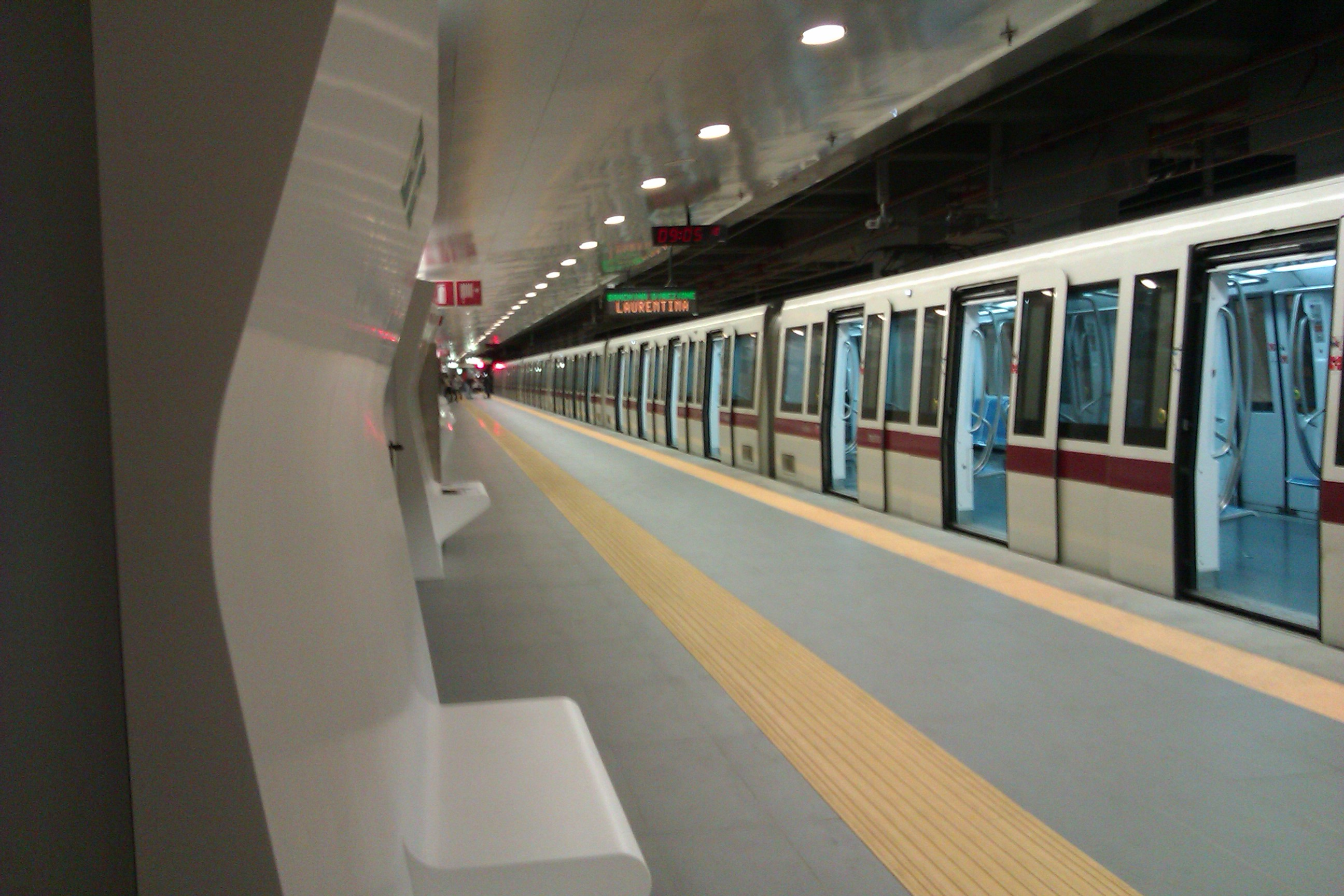
Conca d'Oro station of Rome Metro

The Rome Metro is the rapid transit system serving the city with three underground lines. The first track opened in 1955, making it the oldest in the country. The total length of the network is 60 km (37 mi) with 73 stations. There are three lines A, B - plus a branch called B1 - and C. Lines A and B intersect at Termini station; line C is completely automated and intersects line A at San Giovanni Station and line B at Colosseo Station.

The Metro operates on 62 km (39 mi) of route, serving 77 stations. On 12 May 2018, the western terminus of Line C was moved to San Giovanni (interchange station for line A). On 16 December 2025, the western terminus of Line C was moved to Colosseo (interchange station for line B). It has a daily ridership of approximately 820 thousand passengers, and an annual traffic of approximately 320 million passengers. Line B was the first metro line inaugurated in the system, and the first official metro in Italy, but the names 'A' and 'B' were only added when the second line opened 25 years after the first. Inaugurated in post-war Italy in 1955 during the reconstruction and on the verge of the Italian economic miracle, it was designed and built for the 1942 universal exhibition (Esposizione Universale Roma, which is now the current business center of Rome) desired by the fascist regime, which never took place due to the outbreak of the World War II.

All Rome metro lines are heavy rapid transit lines, with 6-car trains, approximately 105 m long. Line A of the Rome metro uses exclusively the CAF MA 300 series, line B essentially uses the CAF MB400 series together with other CAF MA300 series trains and the historic MB 100 Ansaldobreda. Line C is the longest driverless metro in Italy and one of the largest in Europe, using Hitachi Rail Italy's driverless technology.

Line	Termini		Opened	Newest extension	Length		Stations
Line	Termini		Opened	Newest extension	km	mi	Stations
Line A (Rome Metro)	Battistini	Anagnina	1980	2000	18.4	11.4	27
Line B (Rome Metro)	Laurentina	Rebibbia / Jonio	1955	2015	22.9	14.2	26
Line C (Rome Metro)	Monte Compatri-Pantano	Colosseo	2014	2025	21.2	13.2	24

=== Trams and commuter rail ===
Map of the Lazio regional railways, FL lines

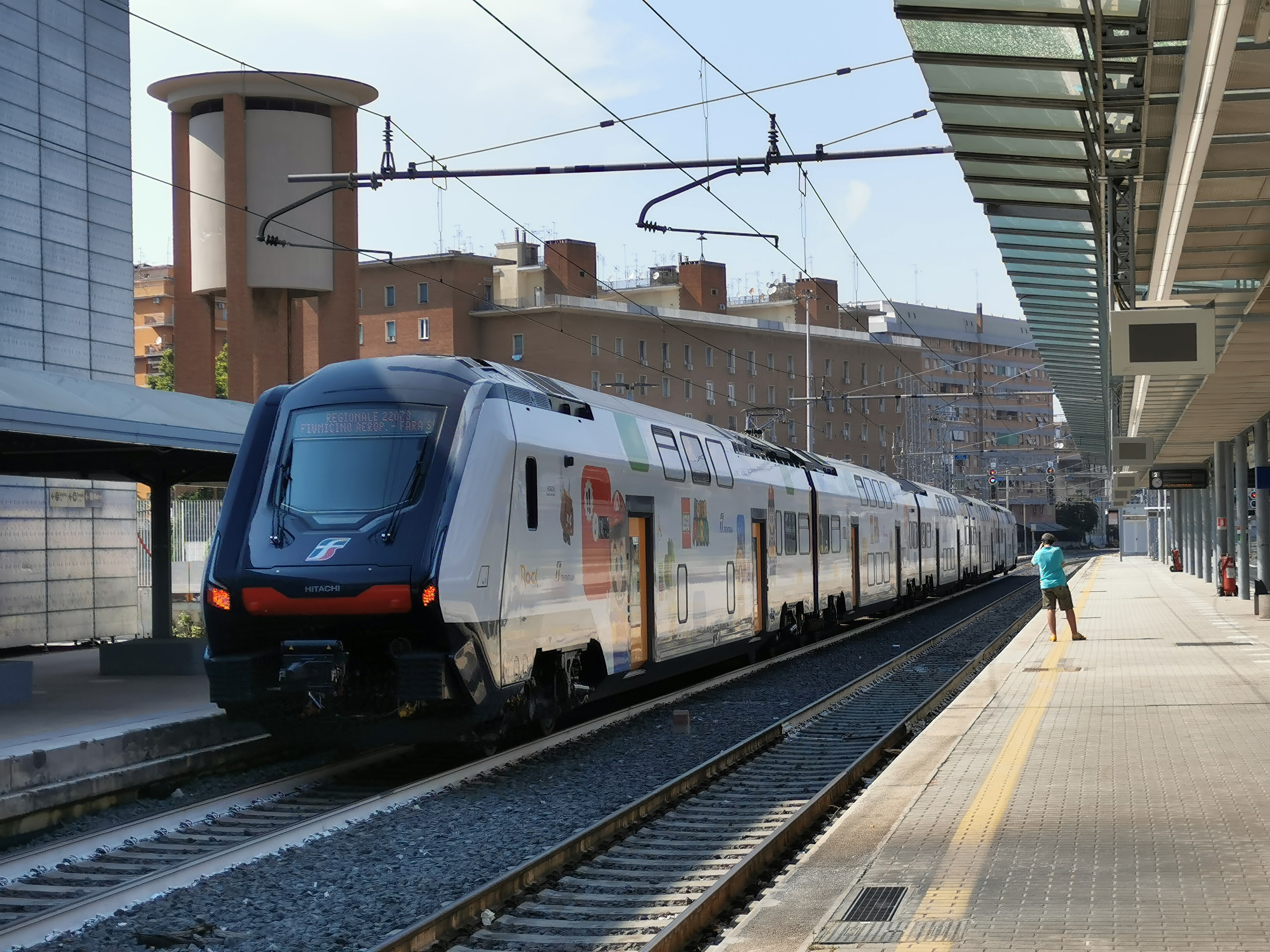
Train of the FL1 line departing from Roma Tiburtina station

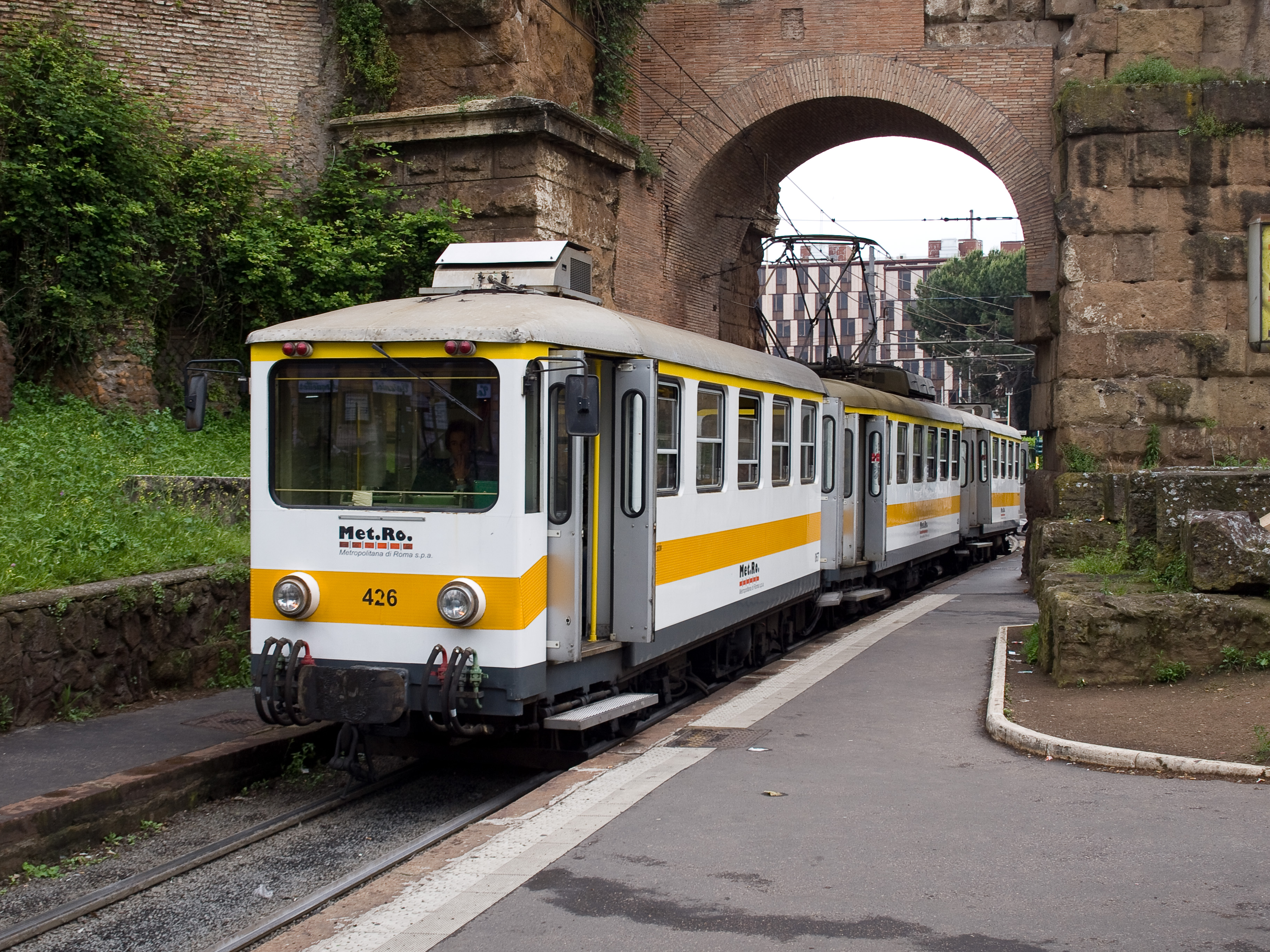
An old tram-train in Rome

Rome's overground rail transport comprises the tramway network, suburban and urban lines in and around the city of Rome. Whereas most FS-Regionale lines (Regional State Railways) provide a largely suburban service with more than twenty stations scattered throughout the city.

- The Rome-Lido (Metromare) (starting at Ostiense station) connects the city with Ostia, the seaside resort of Rome;
- Roma-Nord, starting at Flaminio station, connects the city with the suburban areas in the northern part of the city, with terminus in Viterbo in the extra-urban service.
- Rome–Giardinetti, tram-train line.

The Lazio regional railways - FL lines, a commuter rail system with eight lines which link the suburbs of the Rome metropolitan area and the Lazio region. The FL1 line and the Leonardo Express serves Rome's main airport, Rome Fiumicino Airport; while the FL4 and FL6 lines serves the second airport of the city, Ciampino.

Line	Terminals	Year opened	Daily ridership	Length	Stations	Operator
FL1 (Lazio regional railways)	Orte - Fiumicino Aeroporto	1994	65,000	118 kilometres (73 mi)	26	Trenitalia
FL2 (Lazio regional railways)	Roma Tiburtina - Tivoli	1994	22,000	40 kilometres (25 mi)	13	Trenitalia
FL3 (Lazio regional railways)	Roma Tiburtina - Viterbo Porta Fiorentina	1999	60,000	88 kilometres (55 mi)	28	Trenitalia
FL4 (Lazio regional railways)	Roma Termini - Frascati / Albano Laziale / Velletri	1994	55,000	24 kilometres (15 mi) / 29 kilometres (18 mi) / 41 kilometres (25 mi)	20	Trenitalia
FL5 (Lazio regional railways)	Roma Termini - Civitavecchia	1994	40,000	77 kilometres (48 mi)	14	Trenitalia
FL6 (Lazio regional railways)	Roma Termini - Cassino	1994	50,000	137 kilometres (85 mi)	22	Trenitalia
FL7 (Lazio regional railways)	Roma Termini - Minturno - Scauri	1994	40,000	137.4 kilometres (85.4 mi)	13	Trenitalia
FL8 (Lazio regional railways)	Roma Termini - Nettuno	2004	40,000	60 kilometres (37 mi)	12	Trenitalia

Line	Terminals	Year opened	Daily ridership	Length	Stations	Operator
Rome-Lido railway	Porta San Paolo-Cristoforo Colombo	1924	90,000	28.3 kilometres (17.6 mi)	14	Cotral
Rome–Civita Castellana–Viterbo railway	Rome Flaminio-Civita Castellana-Viterbo	1913		102 kilometres (63 mi)	31	Cotral
Rome–Giardinetti railway	Termini Laziali-Giardinetti	1916		5.4 kilometres (3.4 mi)	19	ATAC

=== Buses ===
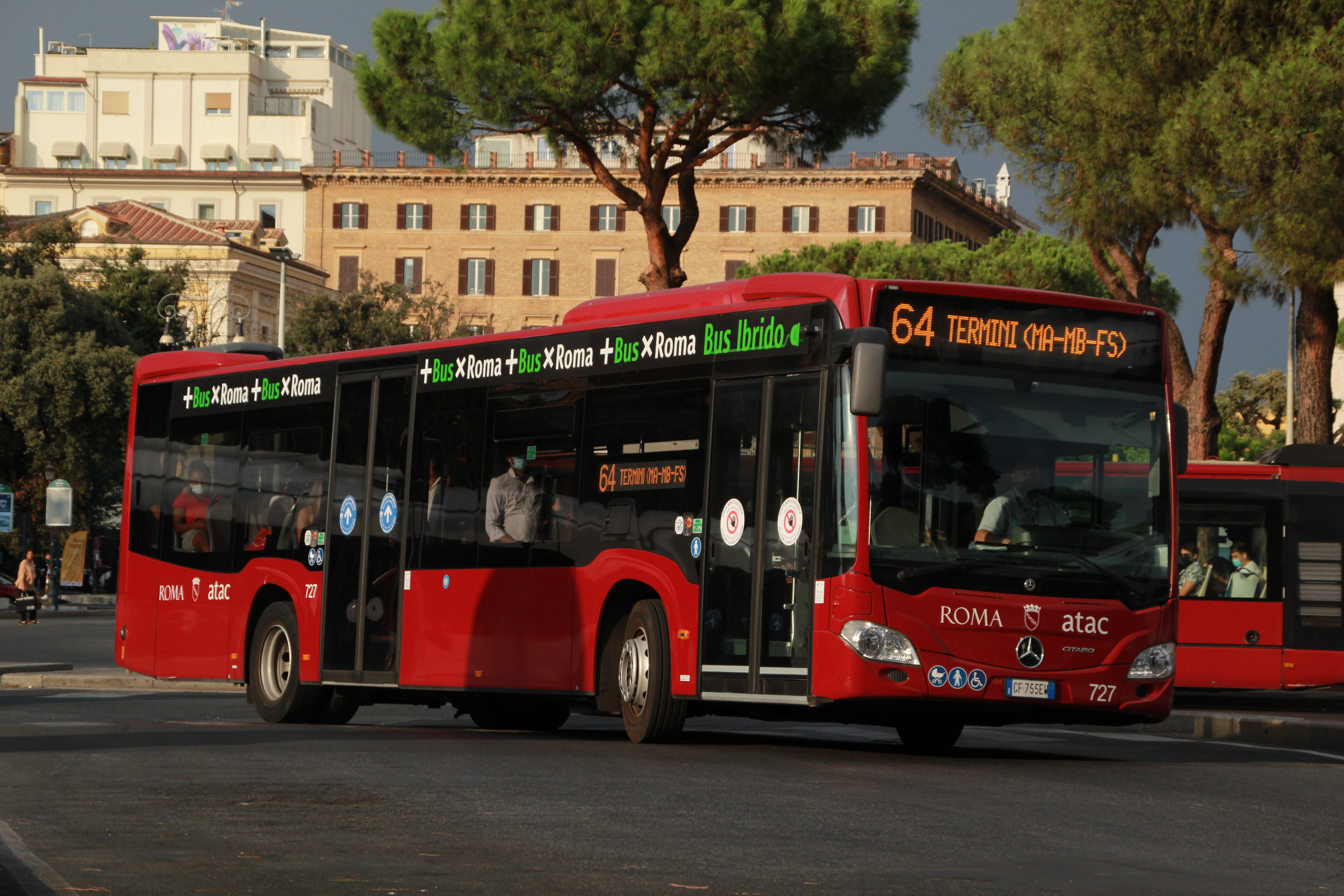
Typical hybrid bus in Termini railway station

Rome has a comprehensive bus network, including three trolleybus routes. The Metrebus integrated fare system allows holders of tickets and integrated passes to travel on all companies' vehicles, within the validity time of the ticket purchased.

=== Classification of bus routes ===
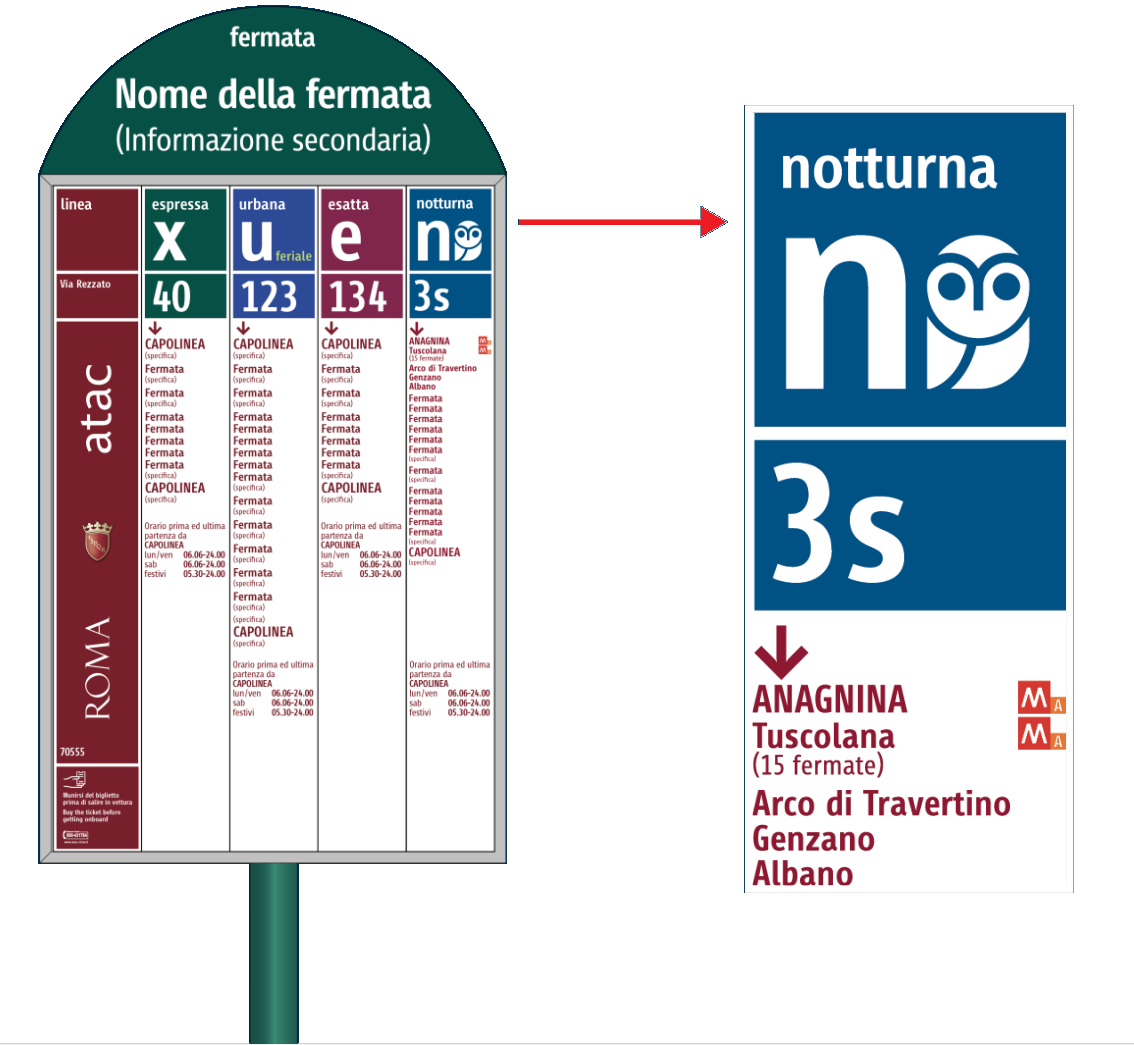
Scheme of a typical bus stop in Rome

Bus routes in Rome are identified by a symbol and a small letter:

- U (Urban bus routes) - regular bus routes around Rome, calling at all stops and operating mostly between 5 am and 12 am. These routes include also one summer seasonal route (062). They are identified by a U letter and a blue background on their number reported on bus stops.
- X (Express bus routes) - they are 12 bus routes (20, 30, 40, 50, 51, 60, 80, 90, 120F, 150F, 180F and 190F). These routes connect the centre of Rome with some far away suburbs and call at lesser stops than Urban routes and tend to have a higher frequency. On bus stops, they can be identified with a green colour and an X letter.
- E (Exact bus routes) - they are a bunch of bus routes with a reduced timetable and operating mainly through peripheral areas of Rome. The name exact is due to their timetables being strictly adhered to. These routes also include those serving local cemeteries. On bus stops, they are identified with a brown colour and an E letter.
- N (Night bus routes) - indicates Rome's night bus network, it is made up of 31 lines and serves a large part of the city, the system also includes 4 night lines (nMA, nMB, nMC and nME) which respectively cover the routes taken by the metro and the Rome-Lido railway (Metromare) when these are closed. They are active from 23:30 to 5:30 am. At the bus stops the night lines are identified by a midnight blue colour, the letter "N" and an owl next to the line number.

=== Route numberings and service areas ===
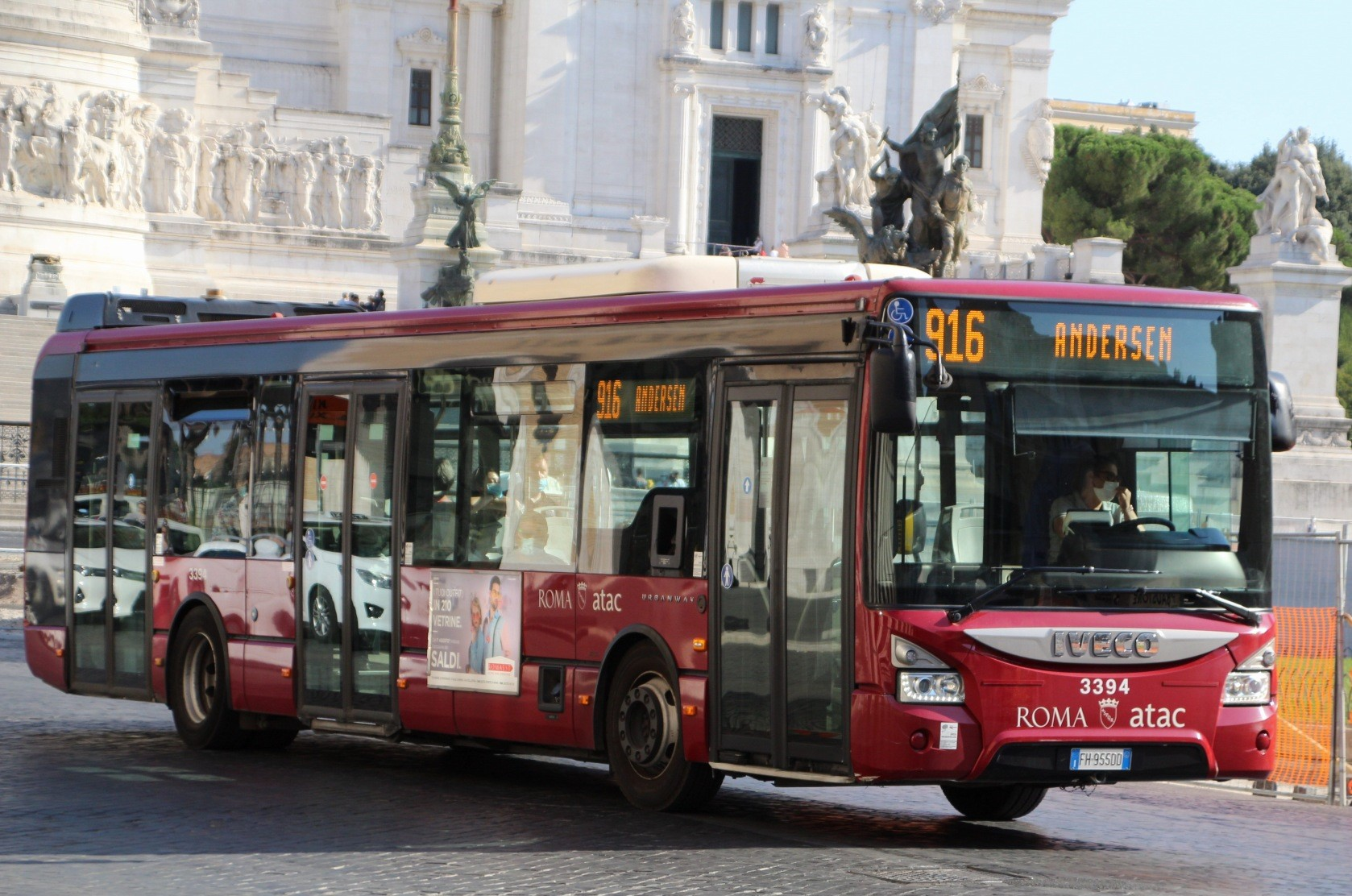
Iveco Urbanway of ATAC 916 in Piazza Venezia

Most bus routes in Rome have three digits. The route numberings, in such cases, depends from the division in Rome in 10 zones (0 to 9). For instance, in case of route 916 it starts from zone 9 (Trionfale-Cornelia stop) and terminates at Rome Termini station on zone 1 (city centre).

The only exceptions to this system are routes 446 (connecting zones 9 and 2) and route 201 (unchanged since 1934). Both of which had been established on a previous numbering system not adjourned.

Other features which can be seen are:

Letters:

- C××× (the letter C stands for cemetery, and as such it identifies those routes connecting residential areas with local cemeteries)
- F (any bus route with the letter F after a numbering operates only on Sundays and public holidays)
- H (route H is the only route in the entire network which number consists only in a letter)
- N (any bus route with the letter N operates during nights only)

In other cases, there are routes whose first digit is 0. It stands for those peripheral routes operating outside the Grande Raccordo Anulare at all times.

== Interurban bus transport ==
Various coach operators can be found in Rome, such as Flixbus, Marino, Busitalia Fast-SIMET and Baltour, operating various connections nationwide and internationally. These mainly depart from the bus stations in Anagnina and Tiburtina (TIBUS), where hundreds of national and international bus lines converge, in terms of passenger volume, around 8 million per year, it is the largest bus station in Italy.

Cotral is the main interurban bus operator in the Lazio region, connecting all the municipalities except from the insular Ponza and Ventotene. Cotral's main departure points in Rome are the bus stations at the metro stops Tiburtina, Anagnina, Cornelia, Ponte Mammolo and Laurentina, connecting the Italian capital to various destinations in the region.

== Railways ==
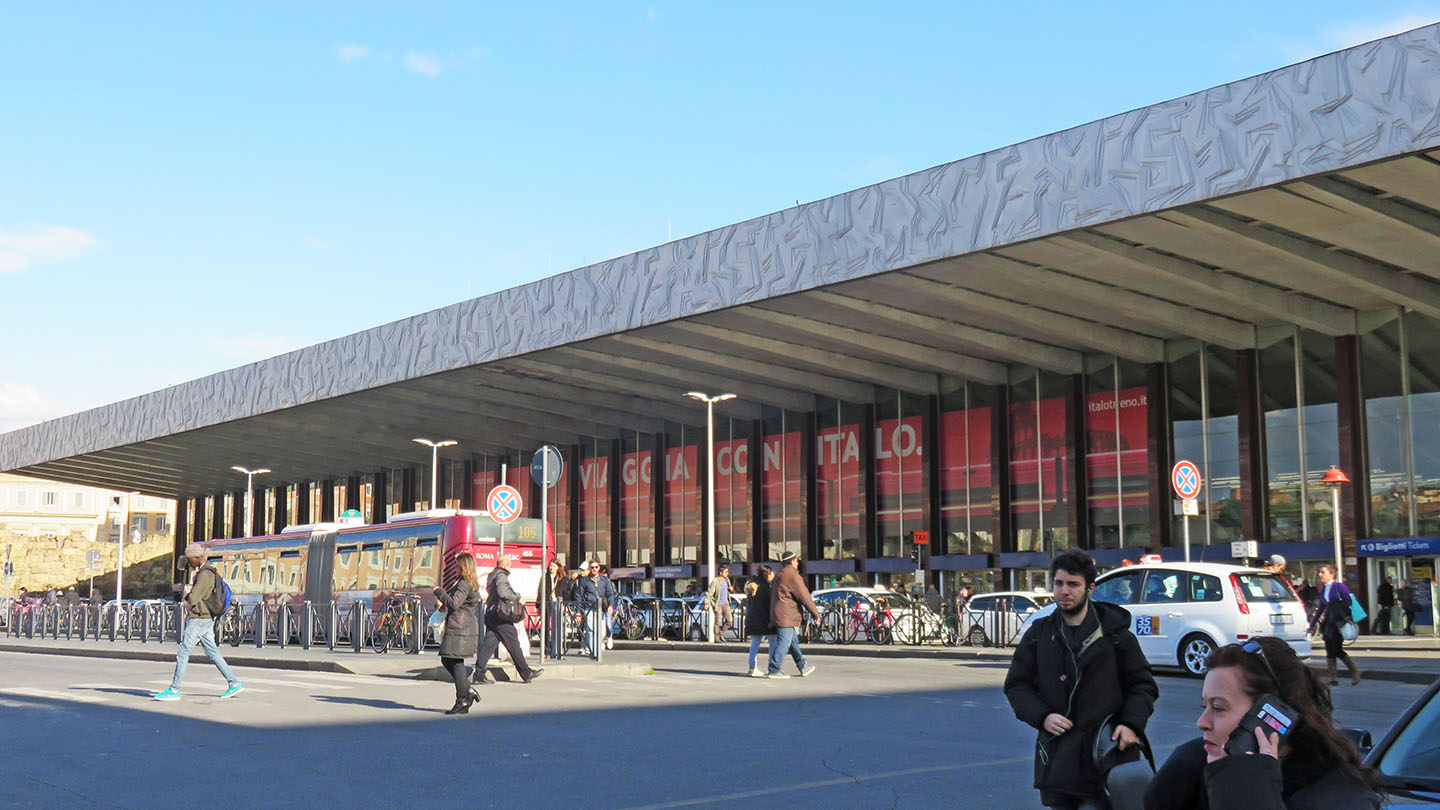
Roma Termini railway station

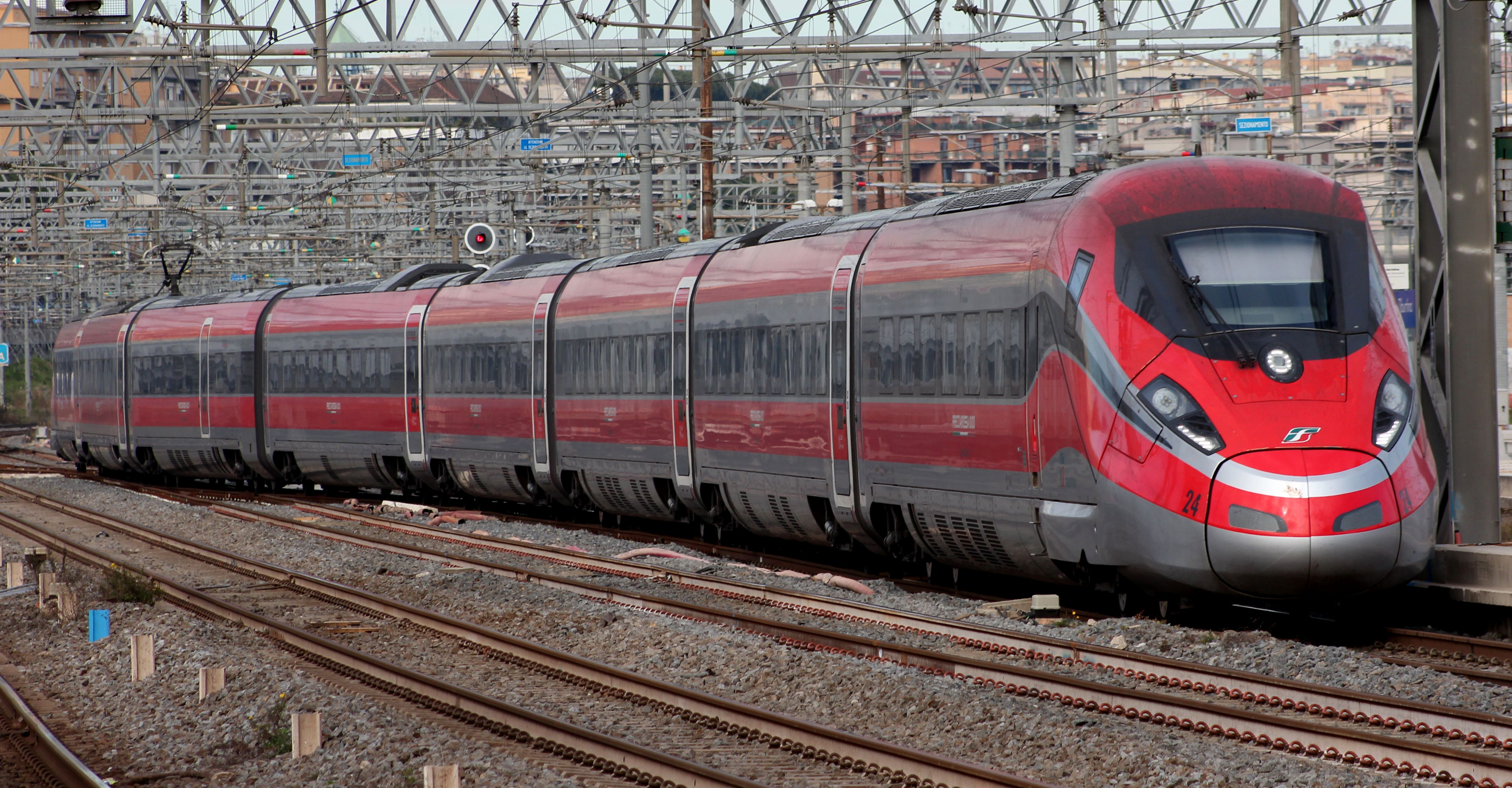
Frecciarossa 1000 high-speed train in Roma Tiburtina station

Rome is one of the major hubs of Italian railway network, along with Milan and Bologna. Located in the center of the Italian Peninsula, Rome is the main railway hub in central Italy, connected by high-speed lines with Florence, Bologna, Milan, Turin, Venice, Naples and Salerno. The other main traffic routes follow - at least in the initial part of the route - the route of the Roman roads: the Tyrrhenian line (Rome-Genoa, along the Via Aurelia); the line northwards initially along the Tiber valley (Rome-Florence-Bologna); the lines towards the Adriatic (Rome-Pescara, along the Via Tiburtina, and Rome-Ancona, along the Via Flaminia); the lines towards the south (Rome-Formia-Naples, along the Via Appia, and Rome-Cassino-Naples, along the Via Casilina). The railway infrastructure in Lazio extends for 1,211 km (752,48 mi) with 163 stations.

The main railway station serving the city, Roma Termini, is the busiest station in Italy and one of the largest in Europe. The second largest station in the city is Roma Tiburtina, which is being redeveloped for high-speed rail service. Other notable stations include Roma Ostiense, Roma Trastevere, Roma Tuscolana, Roma San Pietro, Roma Nomentana and Roma Casilina.

== Roads ==
A scheme of motorway network around the city of Rome, showing the Grande Raccordo Anulare

Rome is served by an extensive motorway network. The most important motorway serving the city is the A90, also known as Grande Raccordo Anulare or GRA (Great Ringroad) which run in a circle around the city. The GRA is connected to the Roman branch of the A1 Milan - Naples and other three motorways which arrive further inside the city: the A12 Genoa - Roma, the A24 Teramo - Roma and the A91 Roma - Fiumicino Aeroporto. All maintened by Anas, the Italian road infrastructure manager.

- Autostrada del Sole towards Florence-Bologna-Milan to the north and Naples to the south, including the two branches: A1 Northern Rome connection and A1 Southern Rome connection;
- Autostrada Azzurra towards the northern coast of the region, provides a quick connection with the main port of Rome of Civitavecchia;
- Strada dei Parchi, from which the A25 branches off to Pescara, both towards Abruzzo;
- Grande Raccordo Anulare (A90), motorway that surrounds the city of Rome and connects all the motorways in the region. The A90 has no toll.
- Rome-Fiumicino towards Leonardo da Vinci airport, from which the A12 branches off. There is no toll.

Traffic congestion in Rome is notorious. This issue is caused mainly by the undersized public transport network and the extremely high cars per capita ratio in the city. It is one of the highest ratios in the country. The Metropolitan City of Rome is the second province in Italy by automobiles per capita (0,687) and 5th by vehicles per capita (0,87).

=== Motor Traffic Limited Zone (ZTL) ===
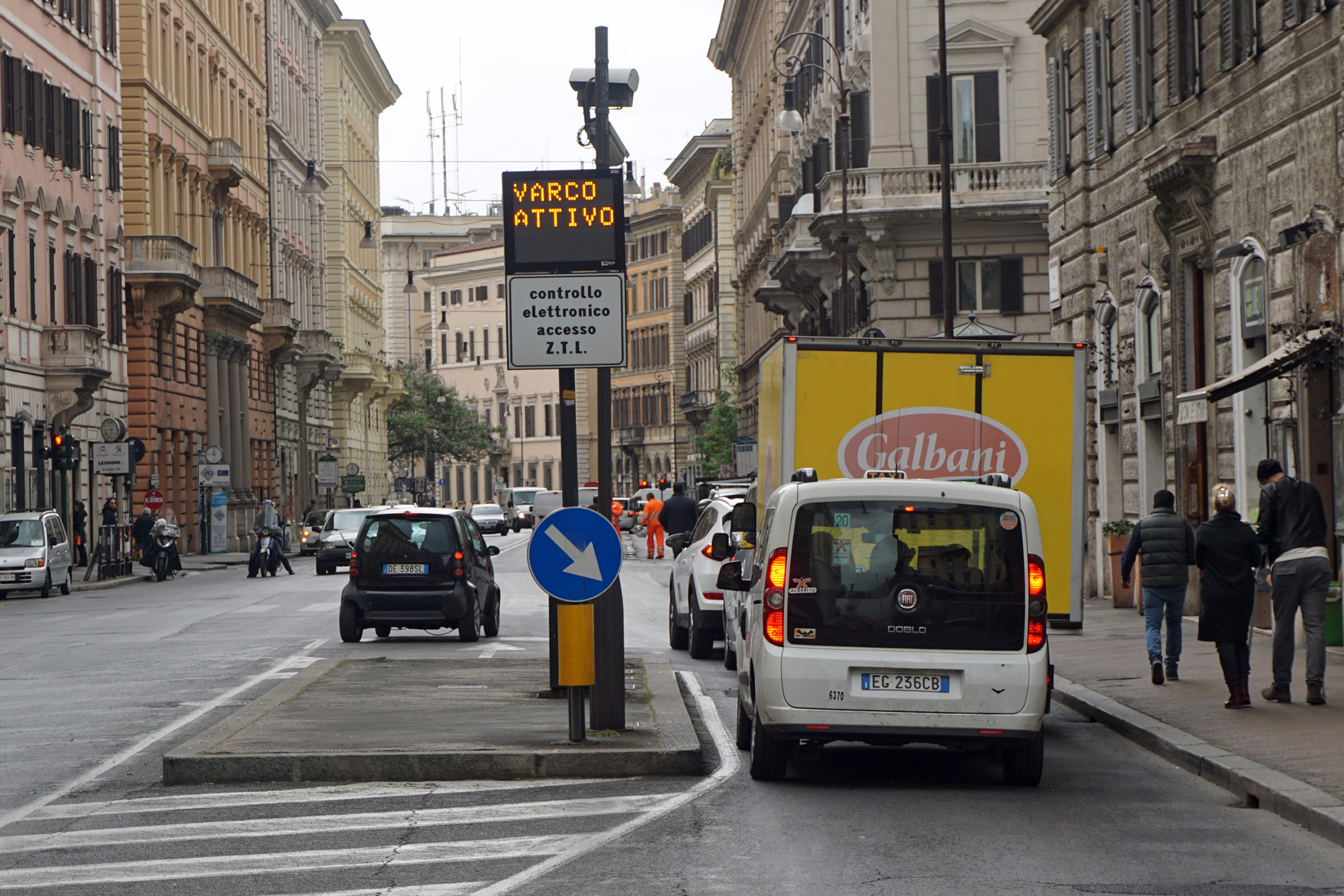
Rome's Traffic Limited Zone (ZTL) entry control point with automatic surveillance

Chronic congestion caused by cars led to the partial banning of motor traffic from the central part of the city during workdays, from 6 am to 6 pm. This area is called Zona a Traffico Limitato (ZTL), motor traffic limited zone.

Heavy traffic due to night-life crowds during weekends led in recent years to the creation of other ZTLs in the Trastevere, San Lorenzo, Testaccio and Monti districts during the night.

Private mobility is also regulated by the environmental protection areas of the "Anello ferroviario e della Fascia verde" (”Railway Ring and the Green Belt” or simply "Green Zone"), which are closed to the most polluting vehicles either permanently or temporarily; and paid parking in the historic center and surrounding neighborhoods, delimited at street level by blue lines, while white lines indicate free parking.

=== Cycling and e-scooters ===
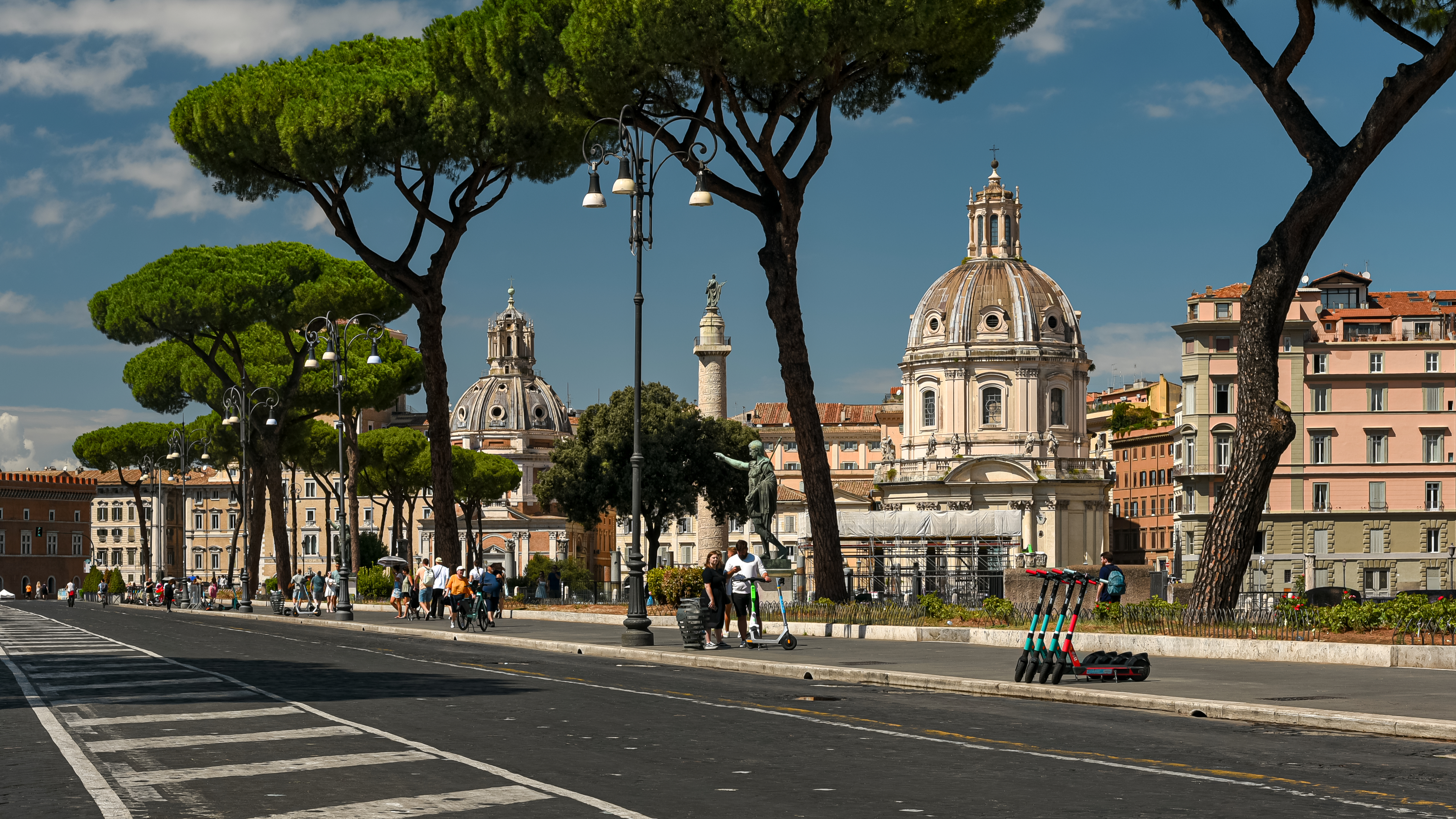
E-scooters on Via dei Fori Imperiali

There are several operators in the city that provide bike sharing and e-scooter services. Rome's cycle path network extends for approximately 320km (198,84mi) and winds through parks and historic villas and along the city's main streets. The network is equipped with 5000 spaces on about 1000 bike racks, 7 metro stations are equipped with bike boxes.

In 2024, the largest construction site for the expansion of Rome's cycle path network began, the "GRAB" ("Grande raccordo anulare delle bici"), a cycle/pedestrian ring that extends for 45 kilometers within the city of Rome, to connect the existing cycle path network and the one currently being designed, in order to make the new infrastructure an integral part of the urban mobility system.

=== Car sharing ===
Sustainable mobility is instead encouraged by classic and free-flow car sharing services. Several car sharing operators are active in the city: the public service operated by the municipality of Rome Carsharing Roma, active since 2005; ”Enjoy” brand of Eni; ”Share Now”; ”eCooltra”; ”BikesBooking”; ”LeasysGO!”. The city is served also by a large network of charging stations with 3588 points available, to support electric mobility in the city.

== Airports ==
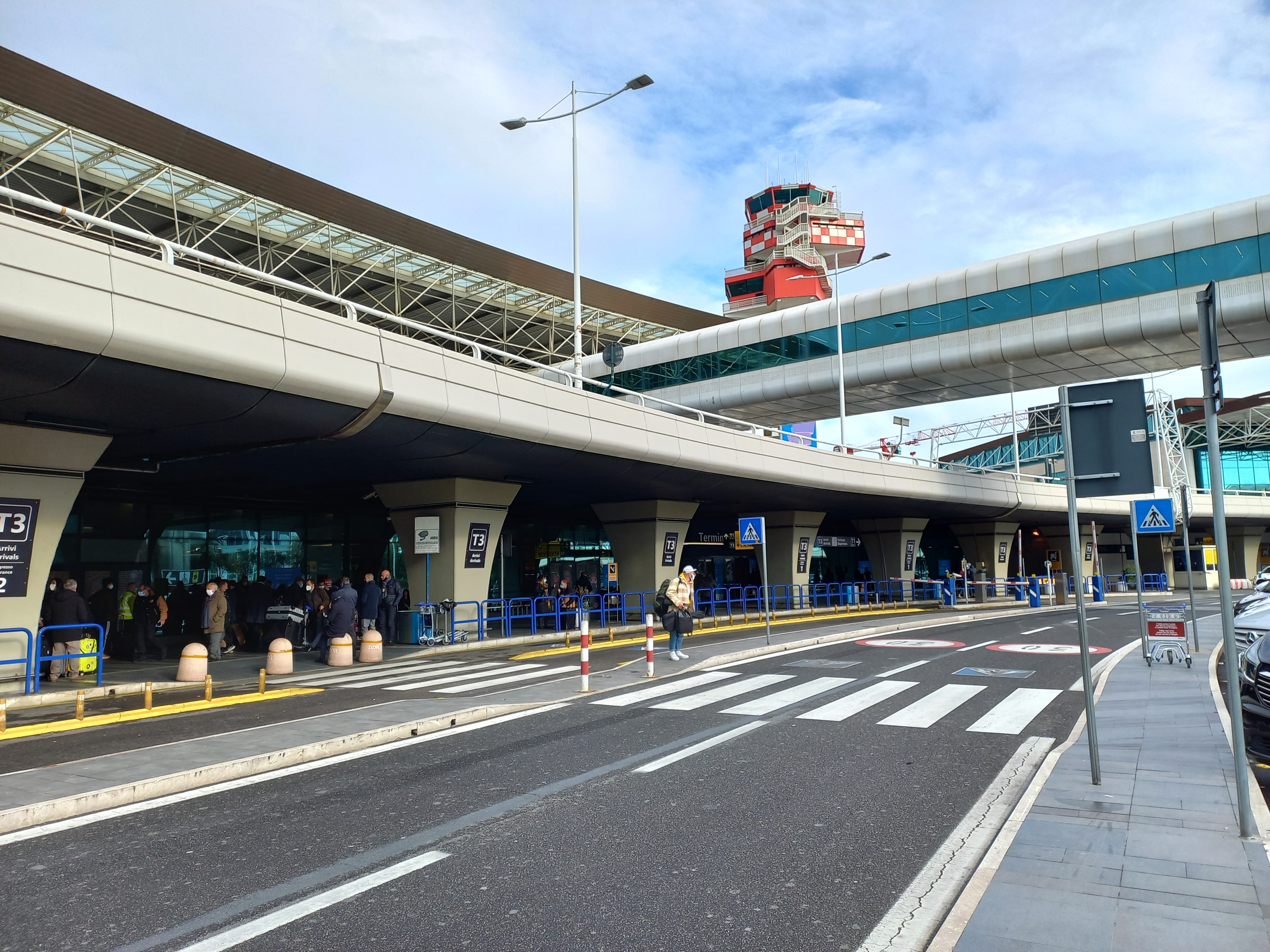
Leonardo da Vinci–Fiumicino Airport.

Rome is served by three civil airports. The intercontinental Leonardo Da Vinci Airport is Italy's largest airport both for national and international traffic and is one of the busiest in Europe, serves long-haul, European and domestic flights. It is more commonly known as Fiumicino, as it is located within the territory of the nearby comune of Fiumicino, in the south-west of Rome. The Rome Ciampino Airport is a joint civilian and military airport. These main two airports are owned and managed by Aeroporti di Roma.

The third airport serving the city, the Rome Urbe Airport, is a small, low-traffic airport located about 6 km (3.7 mi) north of the city centre, which handles most helicopter and private flights.

A fourth airport in the eastern part of the city, the Aeroporto di Centocelle (dedicated to Francesco Baracca), is no longer open to civil flights; it hosts the Comando di Squadra Aerea (which coordinates the activities of the Aeronautica Militare) and the Comando Operativo di Vertice Interforze (which coordinates all Italian military activities), although large parts of the airport are being redeveloped as a public park.

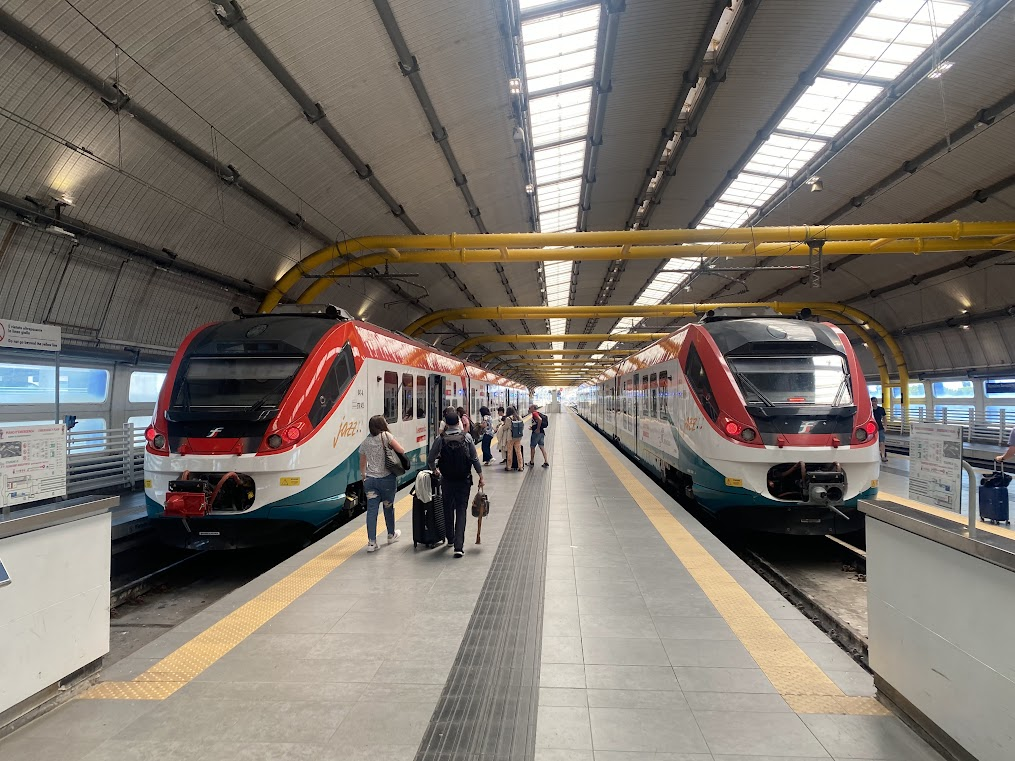
Leonardo Express trains at Fiumicino Aeroporto railway station

Trenitalia's Leonardo Express provides a direct and rapid connection between Termini station (in the heart of Rome) and Rome Fiumicino "Leonardo da Vinci" airport. The journey takes about half an hour with a train every 15 minutes. The airport is also connected to the FL1 suburban railway line, to the Italian high-speed railway network, and it is connected by the A91 motorway. Fiumicino airport is about 30 km (18,63 mi) from the center of Rome.

Ciampino airport is instead connected by the FL4 and FL6 suburban railways, via Ciampino railway station, by the ATAC bus lines 720 and 520, shuttle bus services, Cotral and Atral. Ciampino airport is about 15 km (9,32 mi) from the center of Rome.

== Maritime transport ==
=== Marina of Rome ===
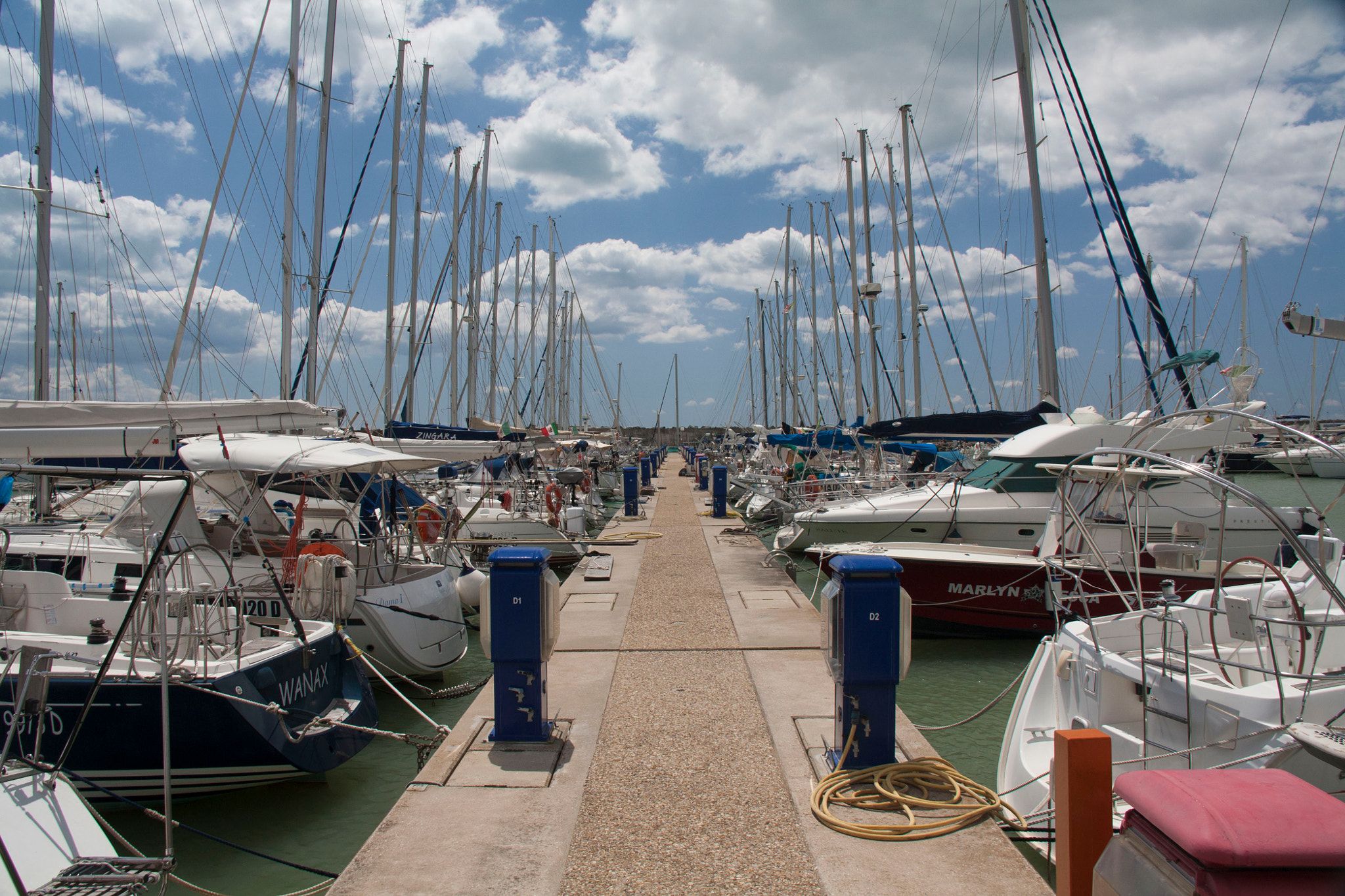
A pier of the tourist port

The Marina of Rome is a tourist port located in the Ostia district, between its beaches and the mouth of the Tiber. It is managed by the Italian police forces (Guardia di Finanza, Carabinieri, Polizia and Capitaneria di Porto) on behalf of the Municipality of Rome and the Lazio Region. It has 833 berths with the possibility of hosting yachts up to 55 meters in length, in addition to a shipyard. It is the main port of arrival in Rome for private maritime transport.

=== Port of Civitavecchia ===
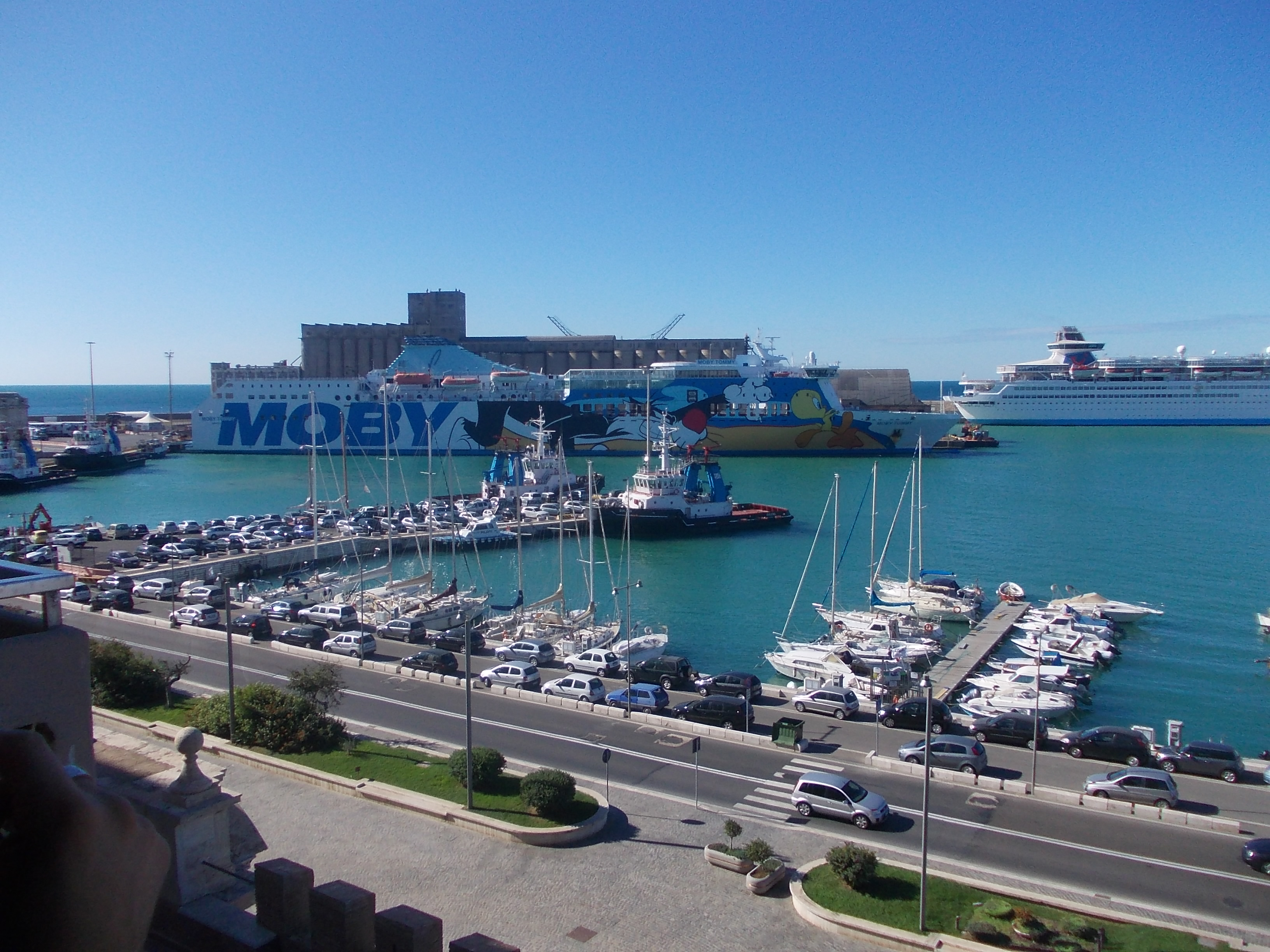
View of the port from Civitavecchia

It is the main connecting port of Rome, commissioned by the Emperor Trajan around 106 BC. Located in Civitavecchia about 1 hour from Rome. It is an important hub for maritime transport in Italy, for goods and passengers, as well as the main Italian cruise port with a traffic of over 3 million passengers per year.

Part of the "Motorways of the Sea", it is connected to several ports in the Mediterranean and represents one of the main connections between the Italian mainland and Sardinia, and with several international routes including Barcelona, Malta and Tunis.

It is a multifunctional port, managed by the Port Authority of Civitavecchia ("Autorità di Sistema Portuale del Mar Tirreno Centro Settentrionale"), which after the expansion of the district which took place in 2002 and completed in 2003, was extended to the ports of Fiumicino and Gaeta, united under the name of "Ports of Rome and Lazio".

== Statistics ==
The average amount of time people spend commuting with public transit in Rome, for example to and from work, on a weekday is 79 min. 22% of public transit riders, ride for more than 2 hours every day. The average amount of time people wait at a stop or station for public transit is 20 min, while 39% of riders wait for over 20 minutes on average every day. The average distance people usually ride in a single trip with public transit is 6.8 km, while 12% travel for over 12 km in a single direction.

== See also ==
- Economy of Rome
- History of Rome
- Tourism in Rome
- Transport in Italy
