= FL4 (Lazio regional railways) =

Roma Termini– Frascati/Albano Laziale/Velletri
- FL4
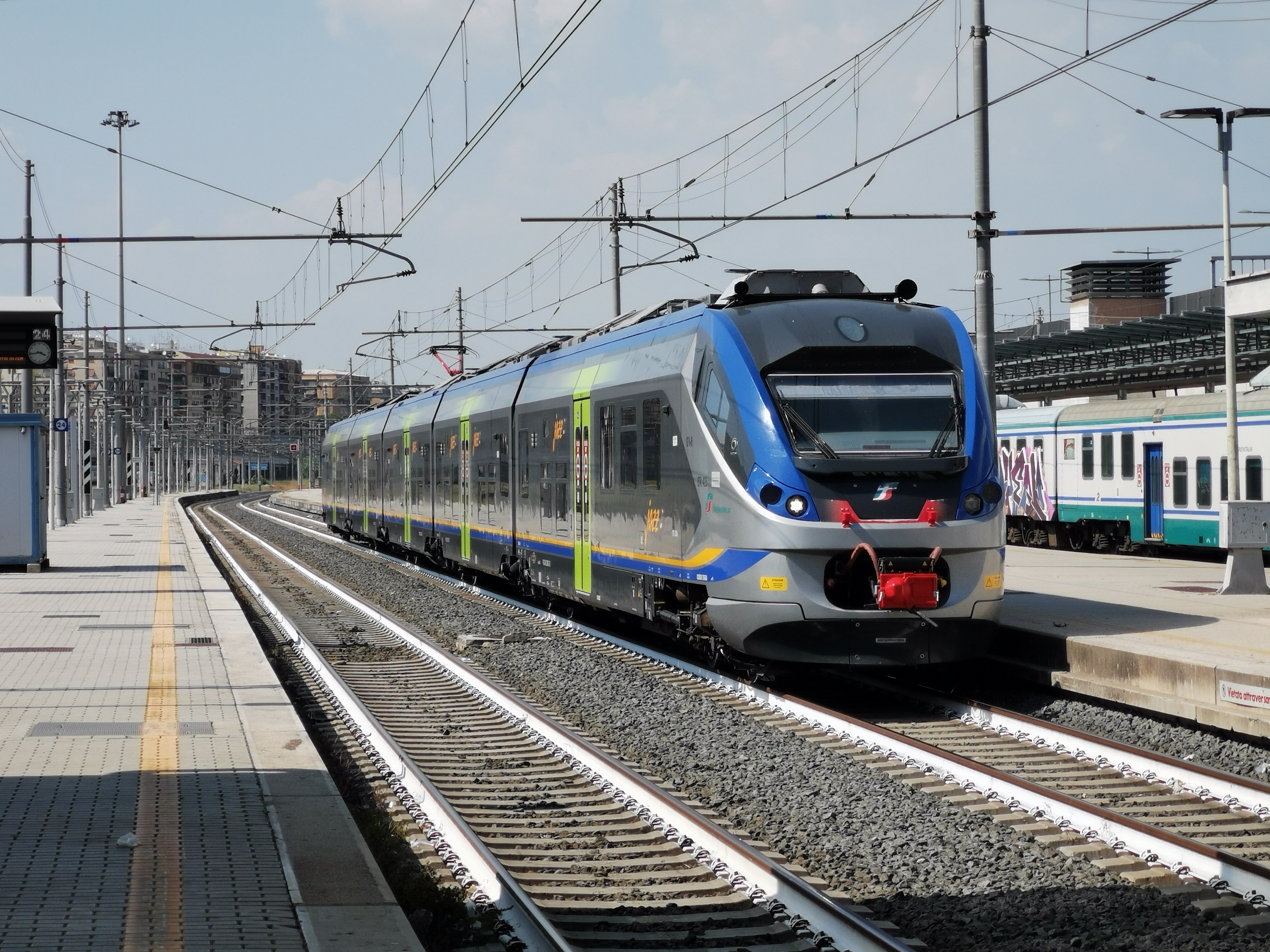
- FL4 Jazz towards Velletri, arriving in Roma Tiburtina

Overview
- Status: Operational
- Line number: FL4
- Locale: Rome, Italy
- Termini: Roma Termini; Frascati / Albano Laziale / Velletri
- Website: trenitalia.com

Service
- Type: Regional rail
- System: Lazio regional railways
- Operator(s): Trenitalia
- Rolling stock: E.464, Jazz
- Daily ridership: 55,000

History
- Opened: 1994

Technical
- Line length: 24 km (15 mi) / 29 km (18 mi) / 41 km (25 mi)
- Track gauge: 1,435 mm (4 ft 8 1/2 in)
- Electrification: 3,000 V DC
- Operating speed: 44 km/h (27 mph) (ave) / 39 km/h (24 mph) (ave) / 48 km/h (30 mph) (ave)
Route map
The Lazio regional railways network.

The FL4 (until 2012 FR4) is a regional rail route. It forms part of the network of the Lazio regional railways (Italian: ferrovie regionali del Lazio), which is operated by Trenitalia, and converges on the city of Rome, Italy.

The route operates over the infrastructure of the Rome–Cassino–Naples, Rome–Albano, Rome–Frascati and Rome–Velletri railways. Within the territory of the comune of Rome, it plays the role of a commuter railway. It is estimated that on average about 55,000 passengers travel on an FL4 train each day.

The designation FL4 appears only in publicity material (e.g. public transport maps), in the official timetables, and on signs at some stations. The electronic destination boards at stations on the FL4 route show only the designation "R" and the relevant train number.

== Route ==
- Roma Termini ↔ Ciampino ↔ Frascati / Albano Laziale / Velletri

The FL4, a radial route, runs from Roma Termini, on the southern perimeter of Rome's city centre, in a south easterly direction, via the Rome–Cassino–Naples railway, to Ciampino, and then fans out into three branches, to Frascati, Albano Laziale and Velletri, respectively.

== History ==
The first of the three FL4 branches to see the light was the Rome–Frascati railway, opened on 7 July 1858, during the reign of Pius IX. At that time, the Roman terminus was located in Piazza di Porta Maggiore, and Frascati was more rural in nature.

Five years later, Roma Termini station was inaugurated, coinciding with the opening of the line to Velletri (continuing to Caserta and Naples). The line to Albano Laziale was opened in October 1889, on the formation of an earlier tramway from Tiburtina station.

All of these lines were later electrified to improve performance. Given the increase in passenger traffic after World War II, they also started to establish themselves as commuter lines; simultaneously, freight traffic shrank drastically to the point where it disappeared. Signalling was managed by a manual electric block system. (IT)

On 27 January 1992, an accident at Casabianca on the Velletri line killed 6 people and injured 124. As a result, a Central Operational Manager (DCO) (IT) was based in Ciampino to control the Albano Laziale and Velletri lines, while the line to Frascati was similarly managed as far as Ciampino.

With the approach of the Great Jubilee of the year 2000, renovation and upgrading work was begun on the Rome-Velletri line; this work included the transformation of the stops at Pavona and Lanuvio into stations, the creation of the San Gennaro stop, and the renovation of several buildings at the stations. On the Rome-Albano Laziale line, the Villetta stop was restored. In early 2000, the disused track no. 1 at Frascati was closed and disconnected from track no. 2.

== Stations ==
The stations on the FR4 are as follows:

- Roma Termini LeoExp
- Capannelle (limit of urban service)
- Ciampino

Frascati branch

- Frascati

Albano Laziale branch

- Acqua Acetosa
- Sassone
- Pantanella
- Marino Laziale
- Castel Gandolfo
- Villetta
- Albano Laziale

Velletri branch

- Casabianca
- Santa Maria delle Mole
- Pavona
- Cancelliera
- Cecchina
- Lanuvio
- San Gennaro
- Santa Eurosia
- Velletri

== Rolling stock ==
FL4 services are commonly operated during rush hour by E.464 class electric locomotives hauling double-decker coaches.

== Scheduling ==
=== Rome–Frascati ===
These services are included in the Trenitalia official timetable M72 Frascati–Ciampino–Roma.

As of 2012, the services ran to an hourly clock-face schedule, with more frequent trains during rush hour. Average travel time for the whole trip is 29 minutes. On the Rome-Ciampino section, FL4 services to and from the three FL4 branches operate about once every 20 minutes, but not to a clock-face schedule.

=== Rome–Albano Laziale ===
These services are included in the Trenitalia official timetable M73 Albano Laziale–Roma.

As of 2012, the services ran to an hourly clock-face schedule, with more frequent trains during rush hour. Average travel time for the whole trip was around one hour. On the Rome-Ciampino section, FL4 services to and from the three FL4 branches operate about once every 20 minutes, but not to a clock-face schedule.

=== Rome–Velletri ===
These services are included in the Trenitalia official timetable M74 Velletri–Roma.

As of 2012, the services ran to an hourly clock-face schedule, with more frequent trains during rush hour. Average travel time for the whole trip was about 50 minutes. On the Rome-Ciampino section, FL4 services to and from the three FL4 branches operate about once every 20 minutes, but not to a clock-face schedule.

== See also ==
- History of rail transport in Italy
- List of railway stations in Lazio
- Rail transport in Italy
- Transport in Rome
