= FL6 (Lazio regional railways) =

Regional rail route in the Rome area

Roma Termini–Cassino
- FL6
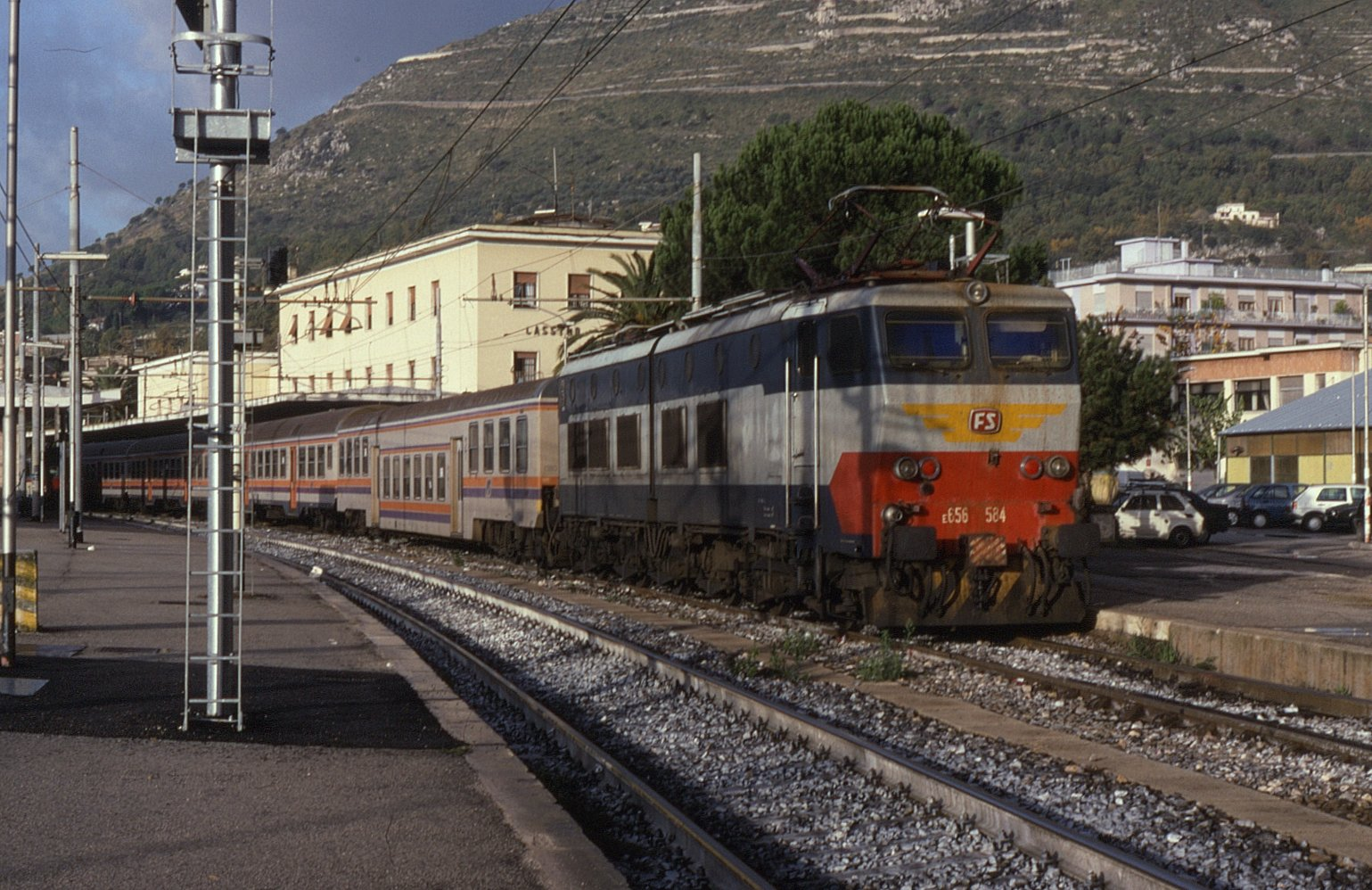
- E.656.584 with an FL6 train at Cassino, 1995.

Overview
- Status: Operational
- Line number: FL6
- Locale: Rome, Italy
- Termini: Roma Termini; Cassino
- Stations: 22
- Website: trenitalia.com

Service
- Type: Regional rail
- System: Lazio regional railways
- Operator(s): Trenitalia
- Daily ridership: 50,000

History
- Opened: 1994

Technical
- Line length: 137 km (85 mi)
- Number of tracks: 2
- Track gauge: 1,435 mm (4 ft 8 1/2 in)
- Electrification: 3,000 V DC
- Operating speed: 60 km/h (37 mph) (ave)
Route map
The Lazio regional railways network.

The FL6 (until 2012 FR6) is a regional rail route. It forms part of the network of the Lazio regional railways (Italian: ferrovie regionali del Lazio), which is operated by Trenitalia, and converges on the city of Rome, Italy.

The route operates over the infrastructure of the Rome–Cassino–Naples railway. Within the territory of the comune of Rome, it plays the role of a commuter railway. It is estimated that on average about 50,000 passengers travel on an FL6 train each day.

The designation FL6 appears only in publicity material (e.g. public transport maps), in the official timetables, and on signs at some stations. The electronic destination boards at stations on the FL6 route show only the designation "R" and the relevant train number.

== Route ==
- Roma Termini ↔ Cassino

The FL6, a radial route, runs from Roma Termini, on the southern perimeter of Rome's city centre, in a south easterly direction, via the Rome–Cassino–Naples railway, to Cassino.

== Stations ==
The stations on the FL6 are as follows:

- Roma Termini LeoExp
- Capannelle
- Ciampino
- Tor Vergata
- Colle Mattia
- Colonna Galleria
- Zagarolo
- Labico
- Valmontone
- Colleferro-Segni-Paliano
- Anagni-Fiuggi
- Sgurgola
- Morolo
- Ferentino-Supino
- Frosinone
- Ceccano
- Castro-Pofi-Vallecorsa
- Ceprano-Falvaterra
- Isoletta-San Giovanni Incarico
- Roccasecca
- Piedimonte-Villa Santa Lucia-Aquino
- Cassino

== Scheduling ==
The FL6 route is included in the Trenitalia official timetable M80 Roma–Cassino–Caserta–Napoli.

As of 2012, FL6 services operated between Roma Termini and Cassino on a clock-face schedule once every hour in each direction. The full trip between these two stations is 138 km (86 mi) long, and takes about two hours.

== See also ==
- History of rail transport in Italy
- List of railway stations in Lazio
- Rail transport in Italy
- Transport in Rome
