= Ciampino railway station =

Railway station in Italy

Ciampino
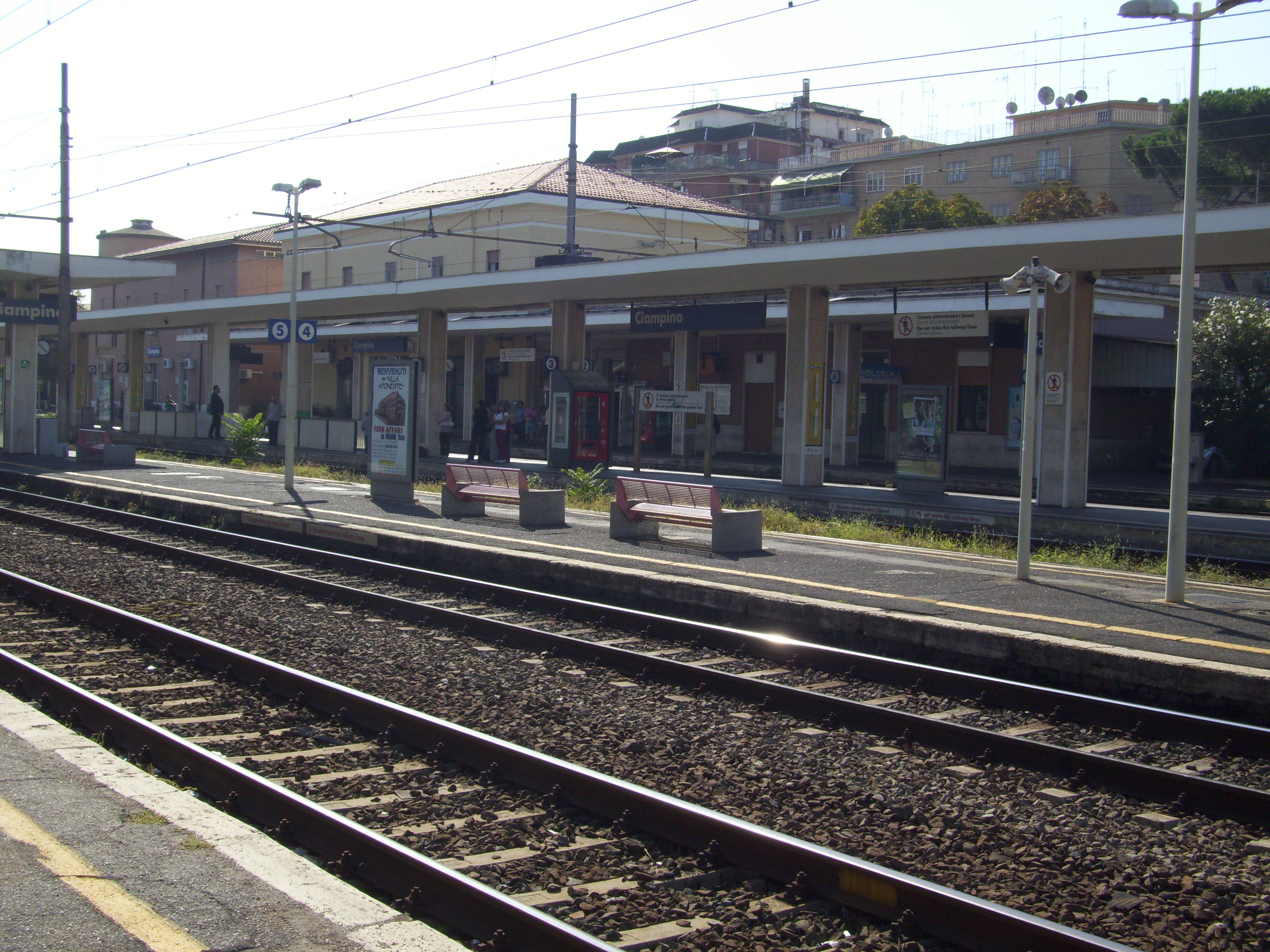

General information
- Location: Piazza Luigi Rizzo; 10034 Ciampino RM; Ciampino, Rome, Lazio; Italy
- Coordinates: 41°48′14″N 12°35′57″E
- Operator: Rete Ferroviaria Italiana
- Lines: Rome–Cassino–Naples; Roma Termini—Frascati / Albano Laziale / Velletri; Roma Termini—Cassino
- Distance: 13.921 km (8.650 mi) from Roma Termini
- Platforms: 7
- Train operators: Trenitalia
- Connections: Ciampino International Airport; Urban buses, and suburban buses to Ciampino Airport and Roma Anagnina

Other information
- Classification: Gold
Location
- Location within Lazio Location within Italy

Ciampino railway station (Italian: Stazione di Ciampino) serves the town and comune of Ciampino, in the region of Lazio, central Italy. It forms part of the Rome–Cassino–Naples railway, and is also a junction for three other lines, to Velletri, Albano, and Frascati, respectively.

== Overview ==
The railway station is currently managed by Rete Ferroviaria Italiana (RFI). Train services are operated by Trenitalia. Each of these companies is a subsidiary of Ferrovie dello Stato (FS), Italy's state-owned rail company.

As one of the most important stations in Rome, and the most important in the southern quadrant of Lazio, the station enables interchange between two Ferrovie regionali del Lazio commuter lines, and also serves Rome-Ciampino Airport.

== Location ==
Ciampino railway station is situated at Piazza Luigi Rizzo, very close to the centre of the town.

== Passenger and train movements ==
The station is part of two Ferrovie regionali del Lazio commuter lines:

- Line FL4 has its central terminus at Roma Termini. When it reaches Ciampino, it forks into three branches, to Velletri, Albano Laziale and Frascati, respectively.
- Line FL6 links Roma Termini with Frosinone and Cassino on the Rome–Cassino–Naples railway.

== Interchange ==
The station has a bus terminal, with urban buses, and suburban buses to Ciampino Airport and Anagnina metro station.

== See also ==
- History of rail transport in Italy
- List of railway stations in Lazio
- Rail transport in Italy
- Railway stations in Italy

== Bibliography ==
- Blasimme, op. cit., p. 22/23
- Service Order no. 151 of the 1939
- Paolo Blasimme, La ferrovia Velletri–Segni, in "I Treni", anno XVI n. 157 (febbraio 1995), pp. 22–26. ISSN 0392-4602

Preceding station	Lazio regional railways	Following station
Capannelle towards Roma Termini	FL4	Casabianca towards Velletri
Capannelle towards Roma Termini	FL4	Acqua Acetosa towards Albano Laziale
Capannelle towards Roma Termini	FL4	Frascati Terminus
Capannelle towards Roma Termini	FL6	Tor Vergata towards Cassino
