= Economy of Rome =

Rome is a major EU and international financial, cultural, and business center. Rome's trade is 0.1% of world economic trade. With a 2025 GDP of €210 billion (US$239.8 billion), the city produces 9.5% of the national GDP and its unemployment rate, lowered from 11.1% to 6.5% between 2001 and 2005, is now one of the lowest rates of all the European Union capital cities. This means that if Rome were a country, it would be the world's 52nd richest country by GDP, near to the size of that of Egypt. Rome also had a 2003 GDP per capita of €29,153 (US$39,412), which was second in Italy (after Milan), and is more than 134.1% of the EU average GDP per capita. Furthermore, Rome hosts several major Italian companies and corporations, almost the same number as Milan, as well as the headquarters of 3 of the world's 100 largest companies: Enel, Eni, and Telecom Italia.

Rome, hosts major international and worldwide political and cultural organizations, such as the International Fund for Agricultural Development (IFAD), World Food Programme (WFP), Food and Agricultural Organization (FAO), and the NATO Defence College. Rome is currently a beta+ world city, along with other cities, such as Berlin and Montreal, and was ranked as the world's 28th most important city in the Global Cities Index. In 2008, Rome ranked 30th in the world for global importance.

== History ==
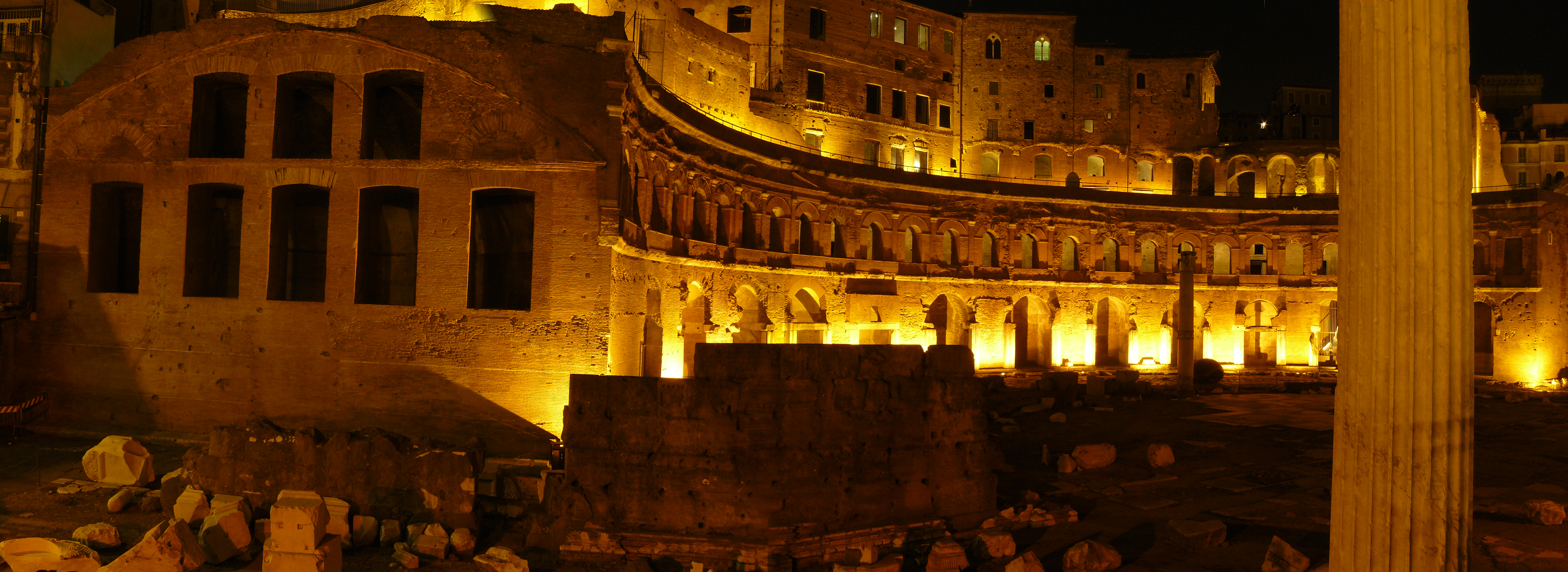
Night view of the Trajan's Market which was built by Apollodorus of Damascus

Ancient Rome commanded a vast area of land, with tremendous natural and human resources. As such, Rome's economy remained focused on farming and trade. Agricultural free trade changed the Italian landscape, and by the 1st century BC, vast grape and olive estates had supplanted the yeoman farmers, who were unable to match the imported grain price. The annexation of Egypt, Sicily and Tunisia in North Africa provided a continuous supply of grains. In turn, olive oil and wine were Italy's main exports. Two-tier crop rotation was practiced, but farm productivity was overall low, around 1 ton per hectare.

Some economists like Peter Temin consider the Roman Empire a market economy, similar in its degree of capitalistic practices to 17th century Netherlands and 18th century England.

After the decline of the Roman Empire, Rome fell into decay, with its ex-economic and political power passing on to other cities, such as Milan, Florence, Venice and Palermo. Even though Rome still had the powerful pope, the city ceased to be a major centre for commerce, trade and finance.

The Roman economy, however, boomed in the 16th and 17th centuries, especially when the Medici popes Leo X and Clement VII were in power. The renaissance transformed Rome into a city of the arts, culture, politics, banking, commerce and trade, especially when the Florentine merchants involved in papal affairs, yielded huge profits.

Rome grew momentously after the war, as one of the driving forces behind the "Italian economic miracle" of post-war reconstruction and modernisation. It became a fashionable city in the 1950s and early 1960s, the years of la dolce vita ("the sweet life"), with popular classic films such as Ben-Hur, Quo Vadis, Roman Holiday and La Dolce Vita, being filmed in the city's iconic Cinecittà Studios. A new rising trend in population continued until the mid-1980s, when the commune had more than 2,800,000 residents; after that, population started to slowly decline as more residents moved to nearby suburbs.

== Sectors ==
=== Tourism ===
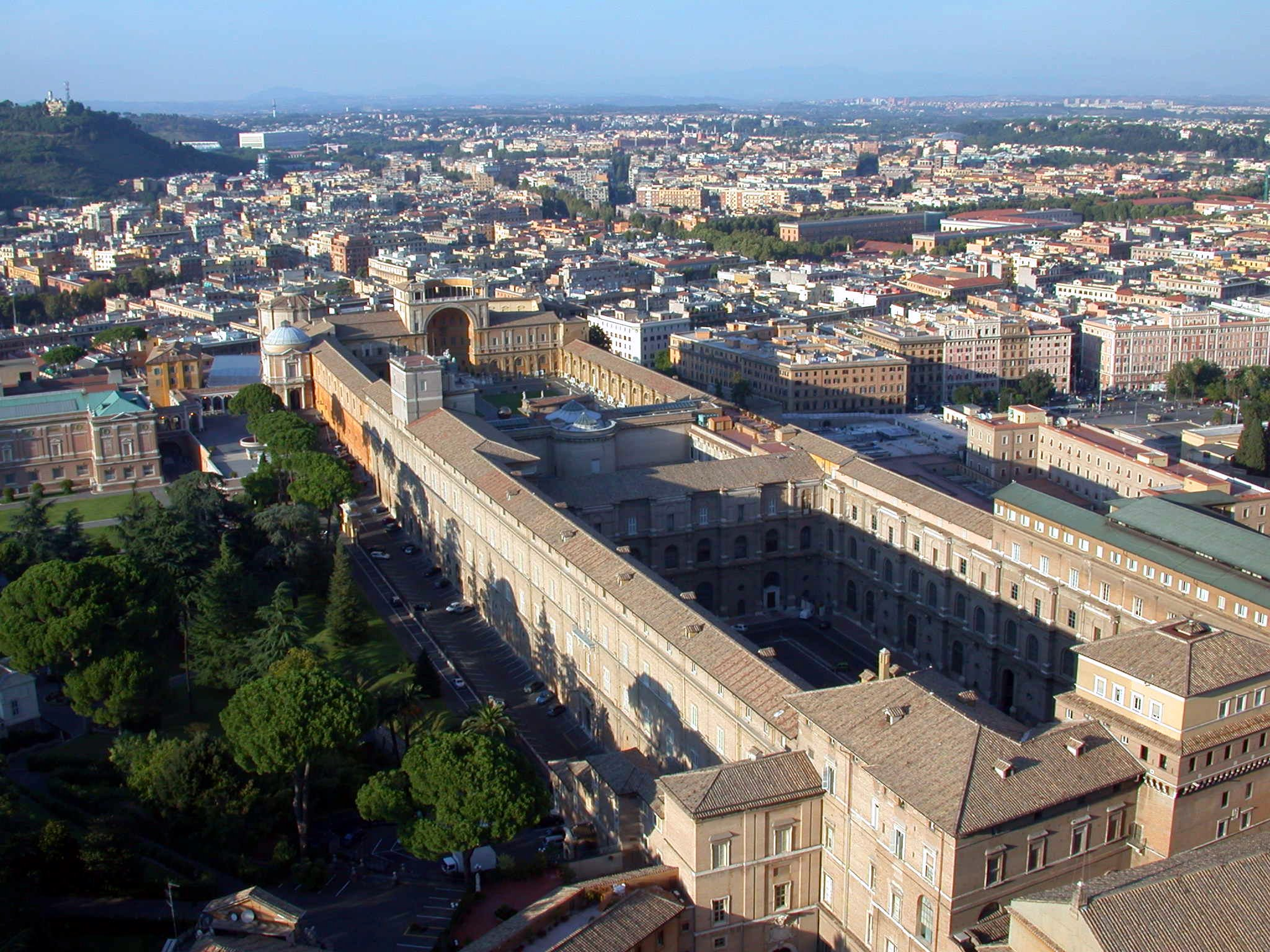
The Vatican Museums are the world's 37th most visited tourist destination, with over 4.2 million tourists a year.

Rome is one of the most important tourist destinations of the world, due to the incalculable immensity of its archaeological and artistic treasures, as well as for the charm of its unique traditions, the beauty of its panoramic views, and the majesty of its magnificent "villas" (parks). Among the most significant resources: plenty of museums - (Musei Capitolini, the Vatican Museums, Galleria Borghese, and a great many others) — aqueducts, fountains, churches, palaces, historical buildings, the monuments and ruins of the Roman Forum, and the Catacombs. Rome is the 3rd most visited city in the EU, after London and Paris, and receives an average of 7-10 million tourists a year, which sometimes doubles on holy years. The Colosseum (4 million tourists) and the Vatican Museums (4.2 million tourists) are the 39th and 37th (respectively) most visited places in the world, according to a recent study. In 2005 the city registered 19.5 million of global visitors, up of 22.1% from 2001. In 2006 Rome has been visited by 6.03 million of international tourists, reaching the 8th place in the ranking of the world's 150 most visited cities.

=== Fashion ===
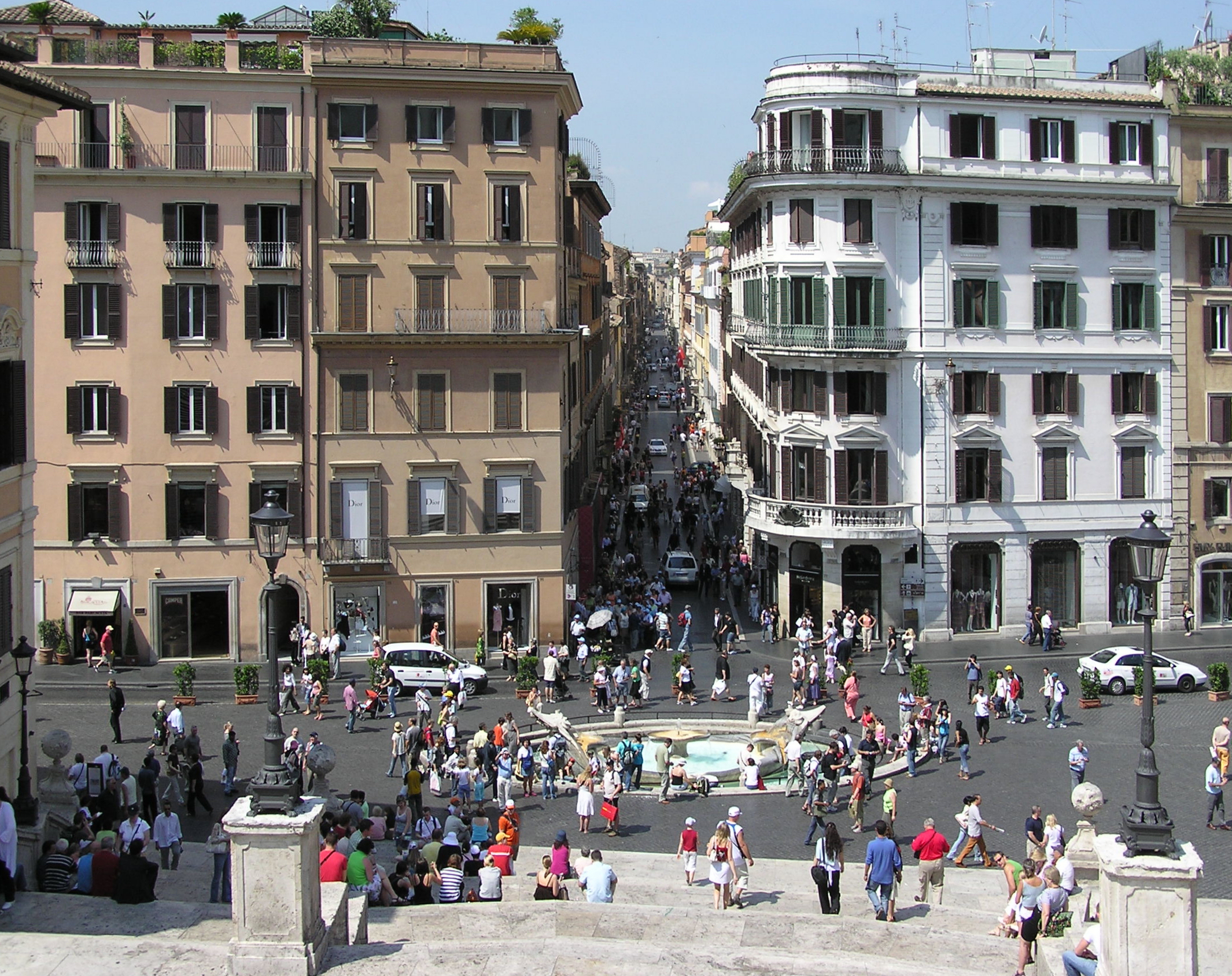
Via Condotti, Rome's main upscale shopping street. Seen from the top of the Spanish Steps.

Rome is widely recognized as a world fashion capital. Although not as important as Milan, Rome is the world's 4th most important center for fashion in the world, according to the 2009 Global Language Monitor after Milan, New York City and Paris, and beating London. Major luxury fashion houses and jewelry chains, such as Bulgari, Fendi, Valentino, Laura Biagiotti and Brioni (fashion), just to name a few, are headquartered or were founded in the city. Also, other major labels, such as Chanel, Prada, Dolce & Gabbana, Armani and Versace have luxury boutiques in Rome, primarily along its prestigious and upscale Via dei Condotti.

=== Cinema ===
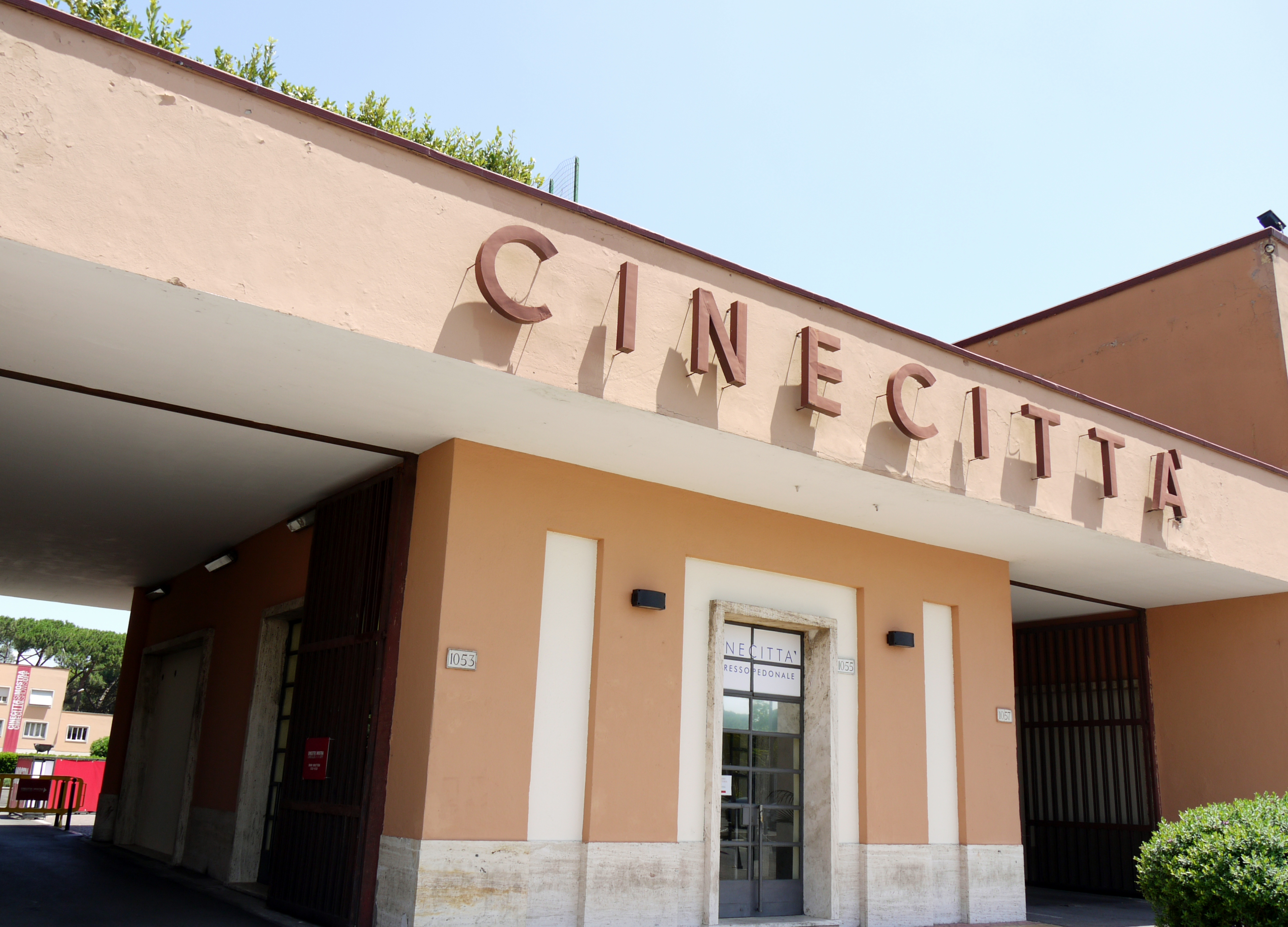
Entrance to the Cinecittà studios

Rome hosts the Cinecittà Studios, the largest film and television production facility in continental Europe and the centre of the Italian cinema, where a large number of today's biggest box office hits are filmed. The 99-acre (40 ha) studio complex is 5.6 miles (9 km) from the centre of Rome and is part of one of the biggest production communities in the world, second only to Hollywood, with well over 5,000 professionals — from period costume makers to visual effects specialists. More than 3,000 productions have been made on its lot, from features like The Passion of the Christ, Gangs of New York, HBO's Rome, The Life Aquatic and Dino De Laurentiis' Decameron, and such cinema classics as Roman Holiday, Ben-Hur, Cleopatra, and the films of Federico Fellini.

Founded in 1937 by Benito Mussolini, the studios were bombed by the Western Allies during the Second World War. In the 1950s, Cinecittà was the filming location for several large American film productions, and subsequently became the studio most closely associated with Federico Fellini. Today Cinecittà is the only studio in the world with pre-production, production, and full post-production facilities on one lot, allowing directors and producers to walk in with their script and "walk out" with a completed film.

=== Commerce, communications and transport ===
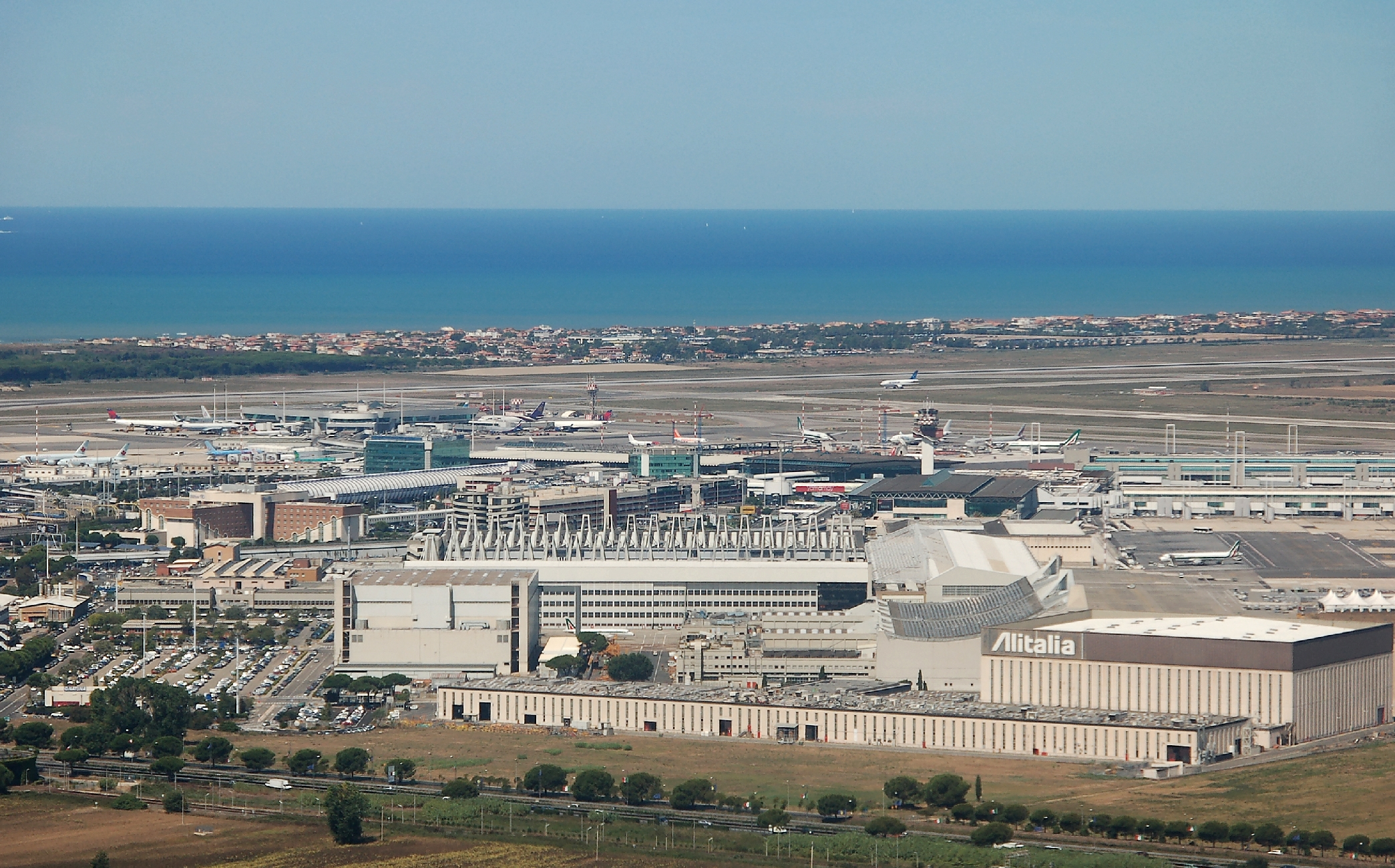
Rome-Fiumicino Airport in 2008 was the sixth busiest airport in Europe.

Although the economy of Rome is characterized by the absence of heavy industry and it is largely dominated by services, high-technology companies (IT, aerospace, defense, telecommunications), research, construction and commercial activities (especially banking), and the huge development of tourism are very dynamic and extremely important to its economy. Rome's main international airport, Fiumicino, is the largest in Italy, and the city hosts the head offices of the vast majority of the major Italian companies such as Ferrovie dello Stato Italiane, Poste Italiane, Leonardo, Webuild, Mundys, BNL, RAI, as well as the headquarters of three of the world's 100 largest corporations: Enel, Eni, and TIM.

=== Industry ===
Rome is also developed in industry. Mainly in the technology sector, telecommunications, pharmaceutical and food industries. Most factories are located in an area called Tiburtina Valley in the east of the city. Other important industrial areas are located in nearby towns such as Aprilia and Pomezia.
