= MAZ-5335 =

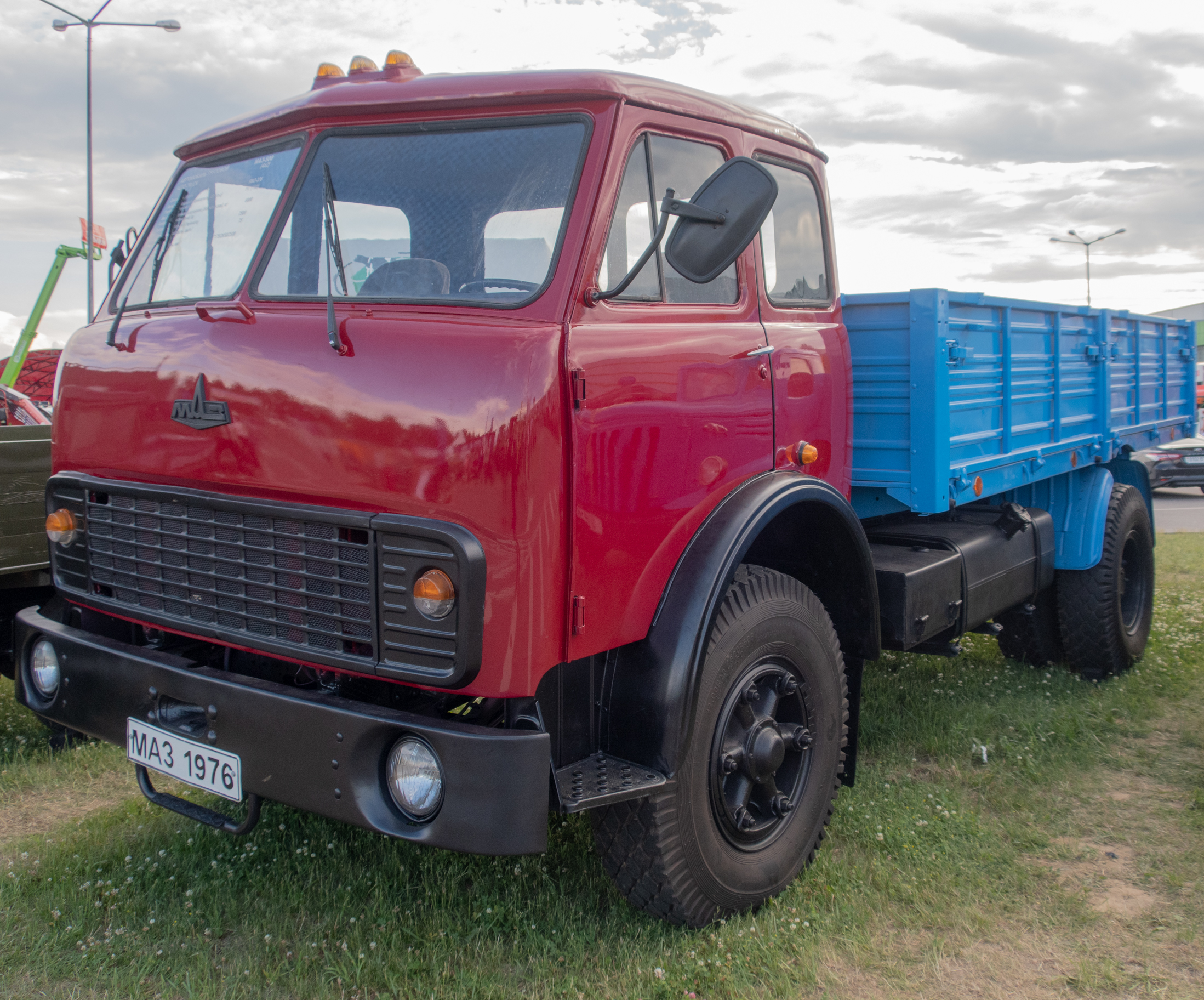

Overview
- Manufacturer: Minsk Automobile Plant
- Production: 1977-1990
- Assembly: Minsk

Body and chassis
- Class: Cab over truck
- Layout: FR layout

Powertrain
- Engine: 11.2L YaMZ-236 V6 diesel
- Transmission: 5-speed manual

Dimensions
- Wheelbase: 3,950 mm (156 in)
- Width: 2,500 mm (98 in)
- Height: 2,720 mm (107 in)
- Curb weight: 14,950 kg (32,959 lb)

Chronology
- Predecessor: MAZ-500
- Successor: MAZ-5336

MAZ-5335 is a Soviet truck, manufactured at the Minsk Automobile Plant from 1977 to 1990.

== Description ==
MAZ-5335 is the updated version of the MAZ-500 series, manufactured at the Minsk Automobile Plant from 1977 to 1990. The main differences from the previous version are new headlights moved to the front bumper and a new grille.

== Modifications ==
- MAZ-5335 (1977–1990): Standard production model.
  - MAZ-53352 (1977–1990): As MAZ-5335 but with a slightly longer wheelbase (500 mm (20 in))
  - MAZ-533501 - a version especially developed to handle extreme cold, down to −60 °C (−76 °F). Amongst other changes, it received double glazing and extra insulation on cables and hoses.
- MAZ-5334 (1977–1990): Cab-chassis version of the MAZ-5335, designed to be fitted with various special purpose bodies.
- MAZ-516B (1977–1990): 3-axle truck with a lifting third axle. Equipped with the 300 hp YaMZ-238N engine.
- MAZ-5549 (1977–1990): Dump truck, improved version of MAZ-503A.
- MAZ-5428: Prototype three-axle tractor-trailer, possibly meant to replace the MAZ-504V.
- MAZ-5429, MAZ-5430 (1977–1990): Two-axle tractor-trailer version, an improved version of MAZ-504A. The MAZ-5430 was equipped with hydraulics for towing tipping trailers.
- MAZ-504V2: Tractor-trailer based on MAZ-5429 for international routes with Sovtransavto. Equipped with the YaMZ-238 engine.
- MAZ-509A (1978–1990): Logging truck based on the MAZ-5335.
- MAZ-515B: Three-axle tractor-trailer, improved version of MAZ-515A. The cab was from the MAZ-5335 and had a new bumper with rectangular headlights, similar to the MAZ-5428.
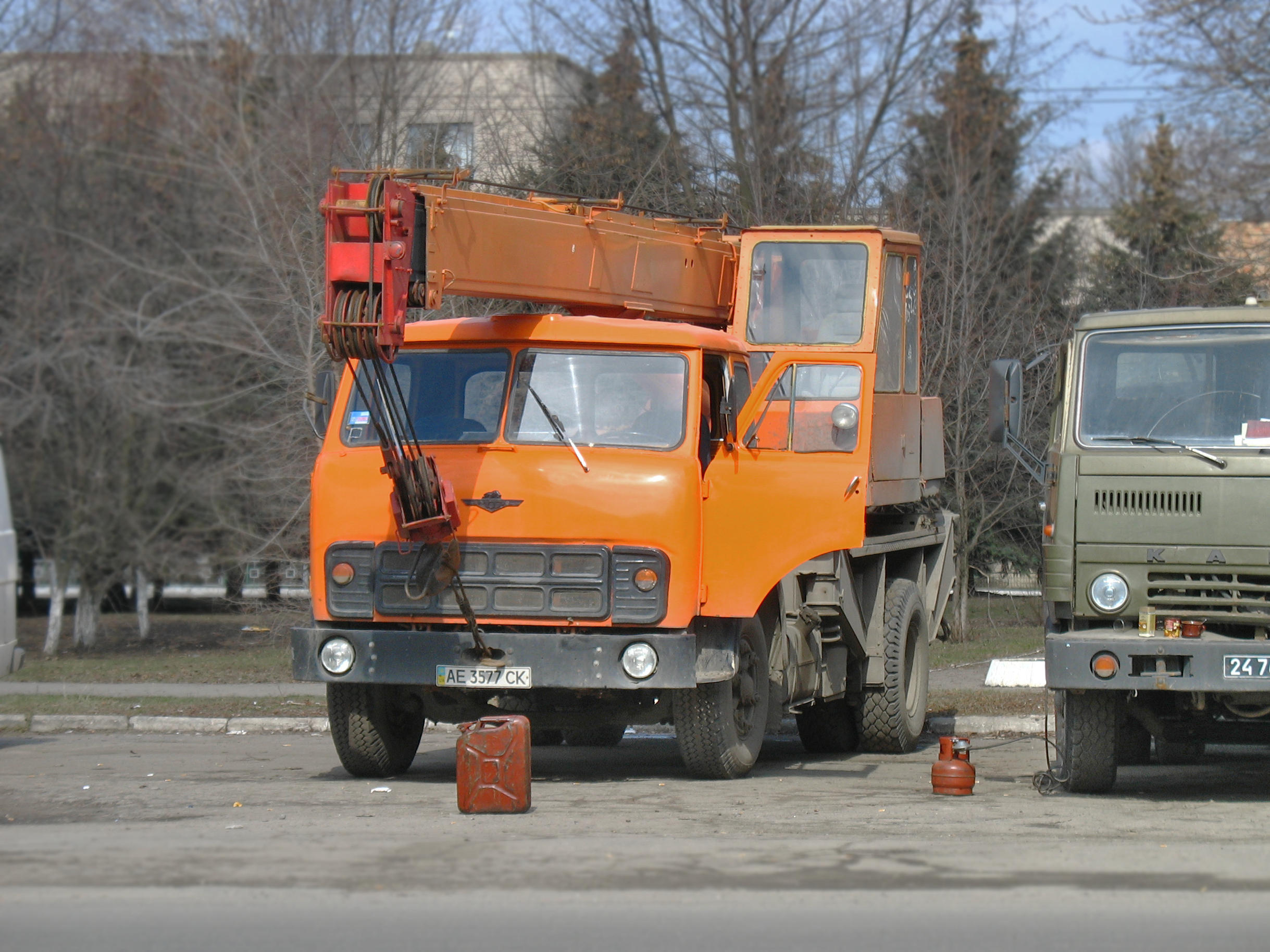
МАZ-5334, truck crane КS-3577

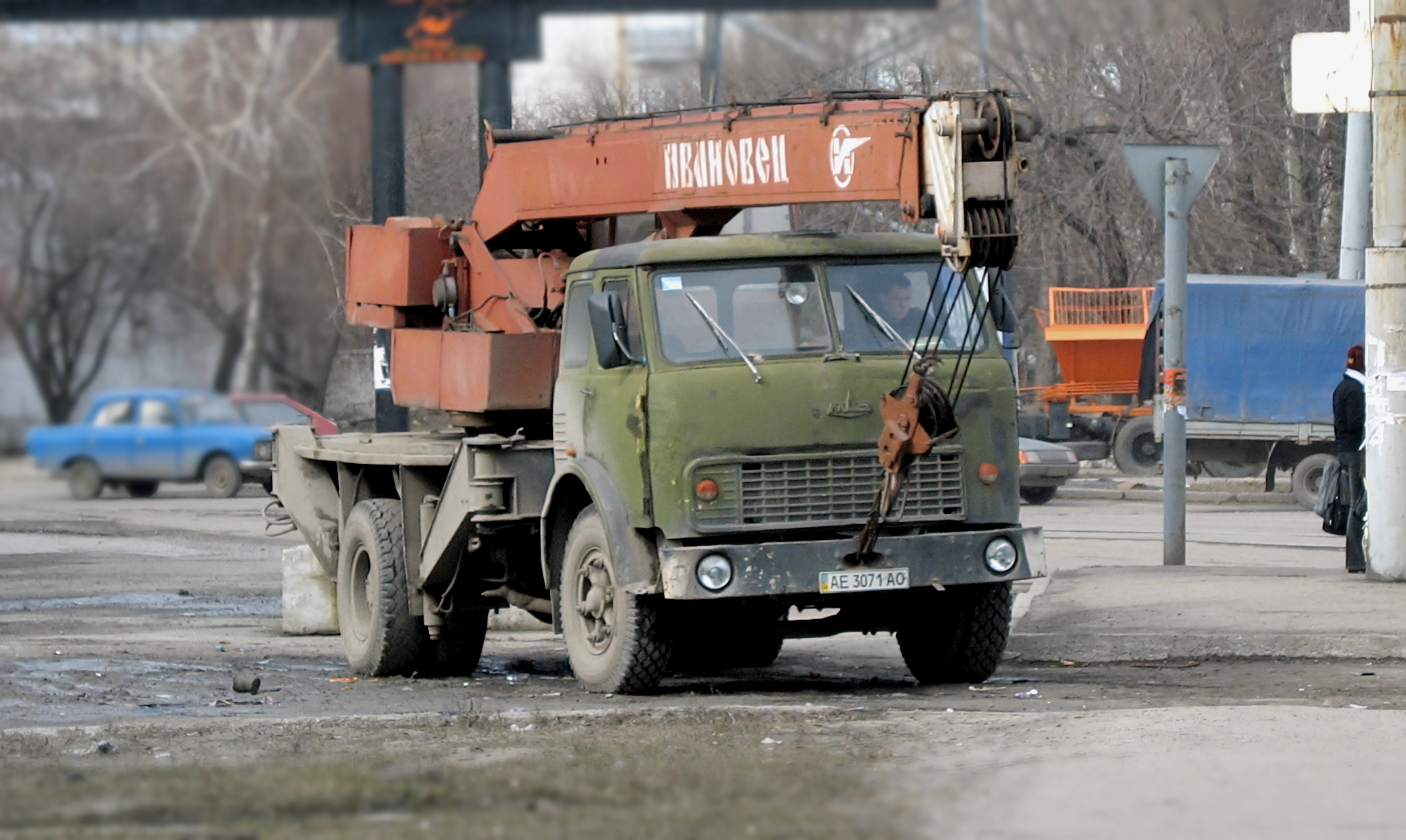
МАZ-5334, truck crane КS-3577

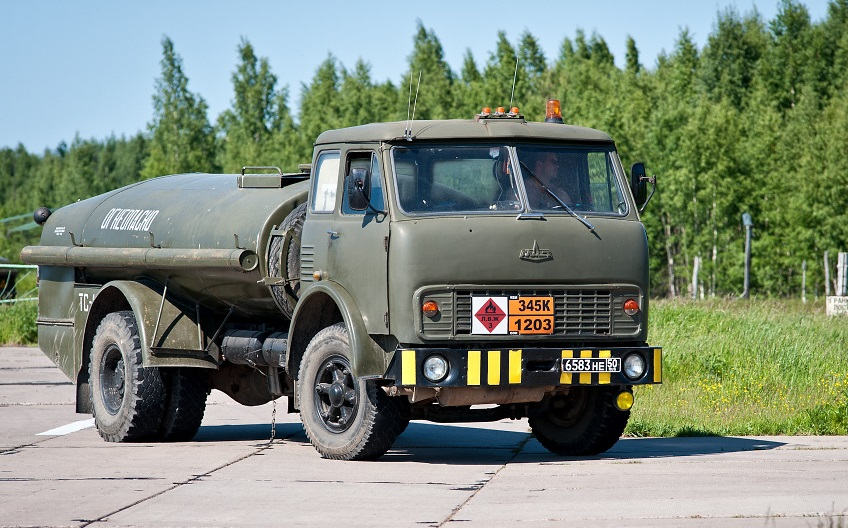
МАZ-5334, fuel truck TZA-7,5-5334

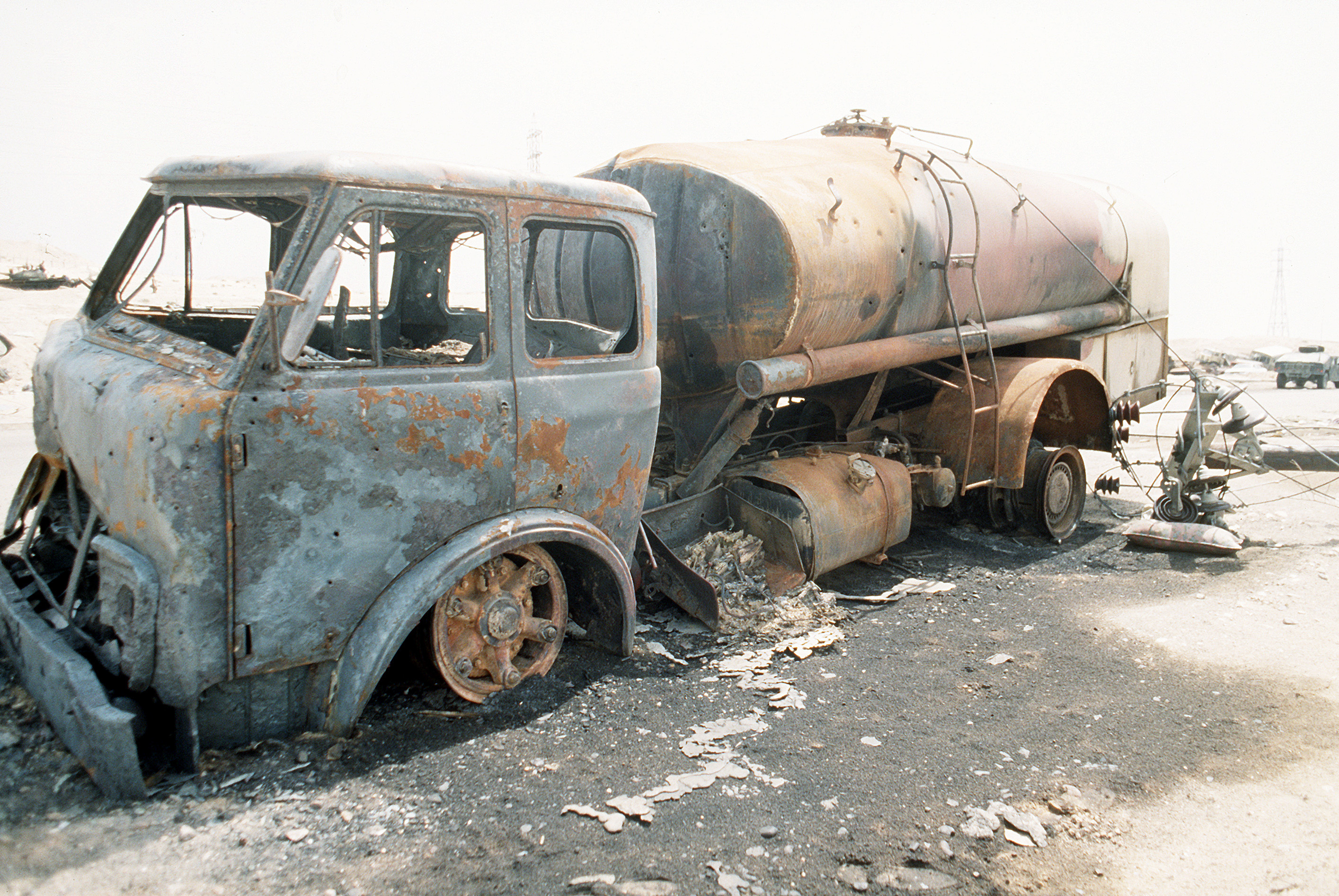
Iraqi TZ-500 fuel truck destroyed during Operation Desert Storm, 1991

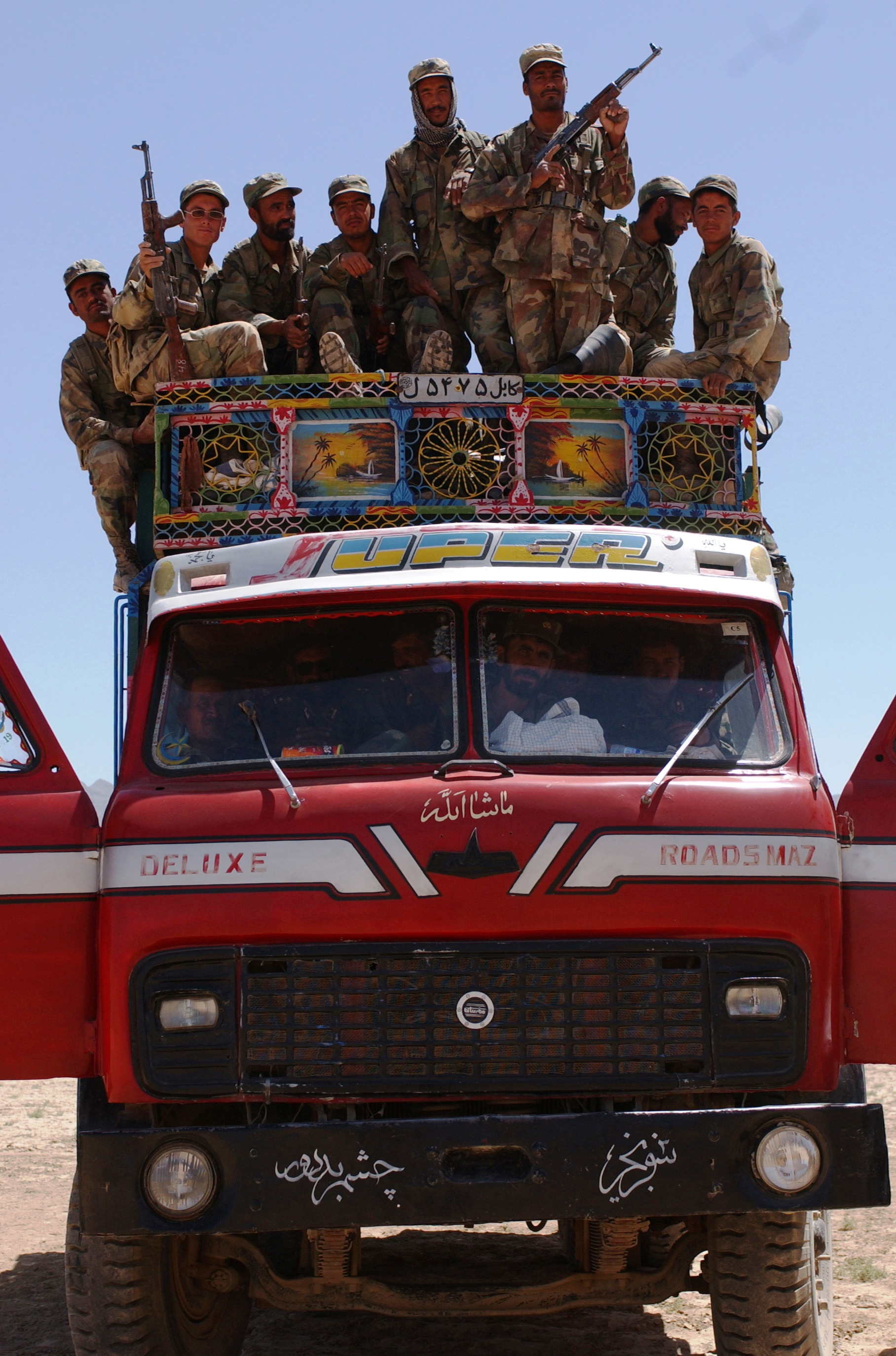
МАZ-5335, Afghanistan

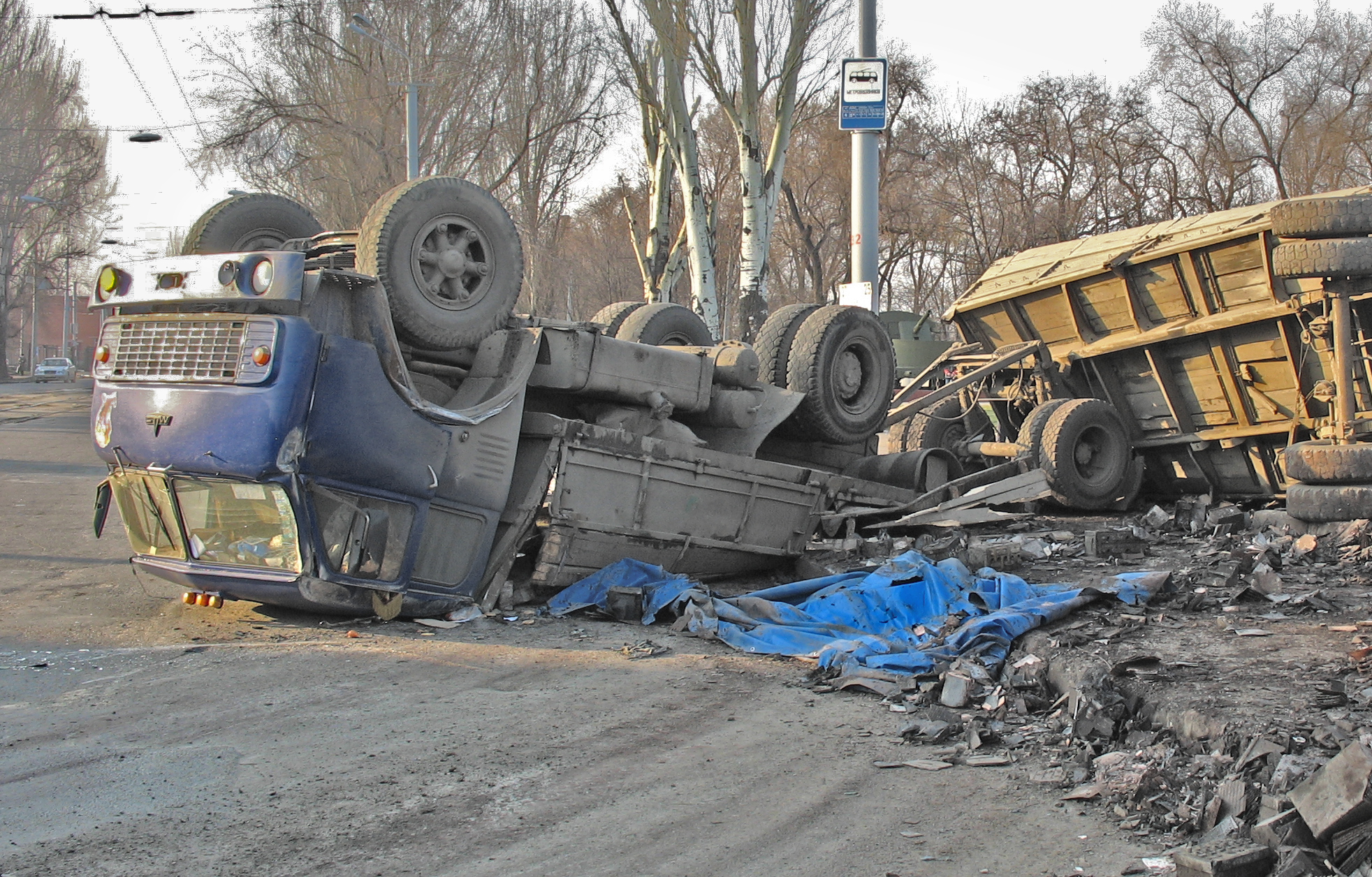
MAZ-5335, crash in a road accident

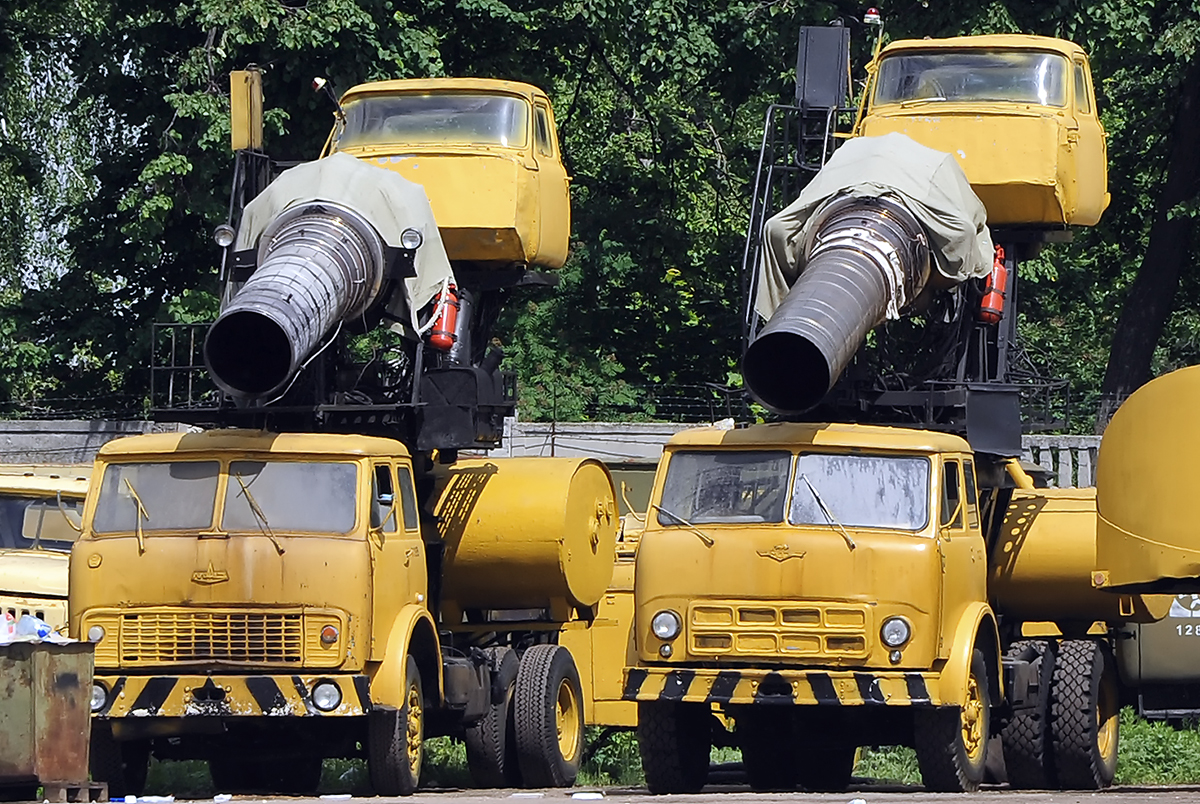
Special cars for aerodrom use. Left Truck is a MAZ-5335 (head lights integrated in front bumper), right one a MAZ-500A.

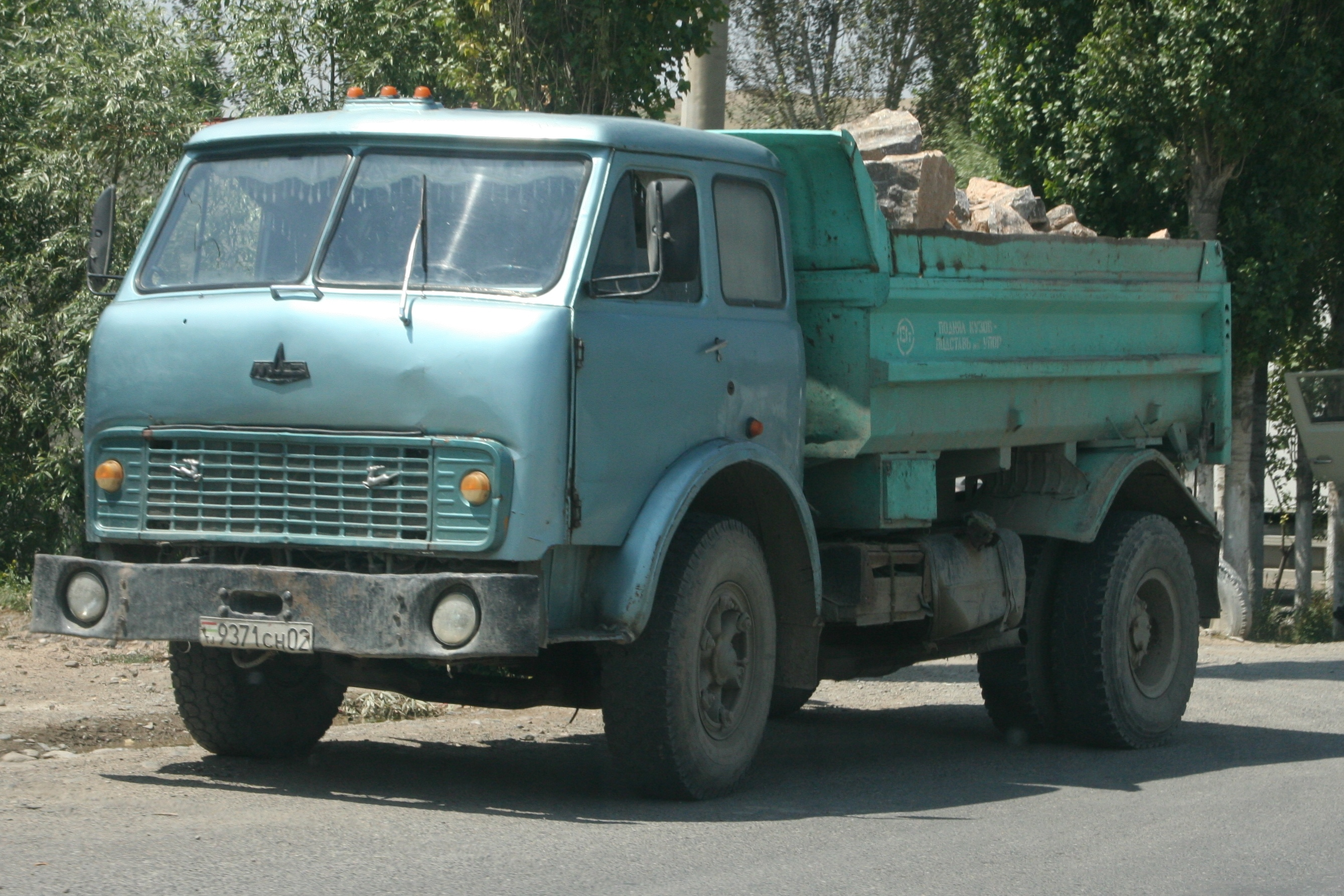
MAZ-5549 dump truck (1977–1990)

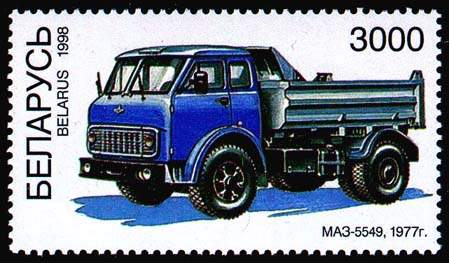
MAZ-5549, postage stamp
