= MAZ-500 =

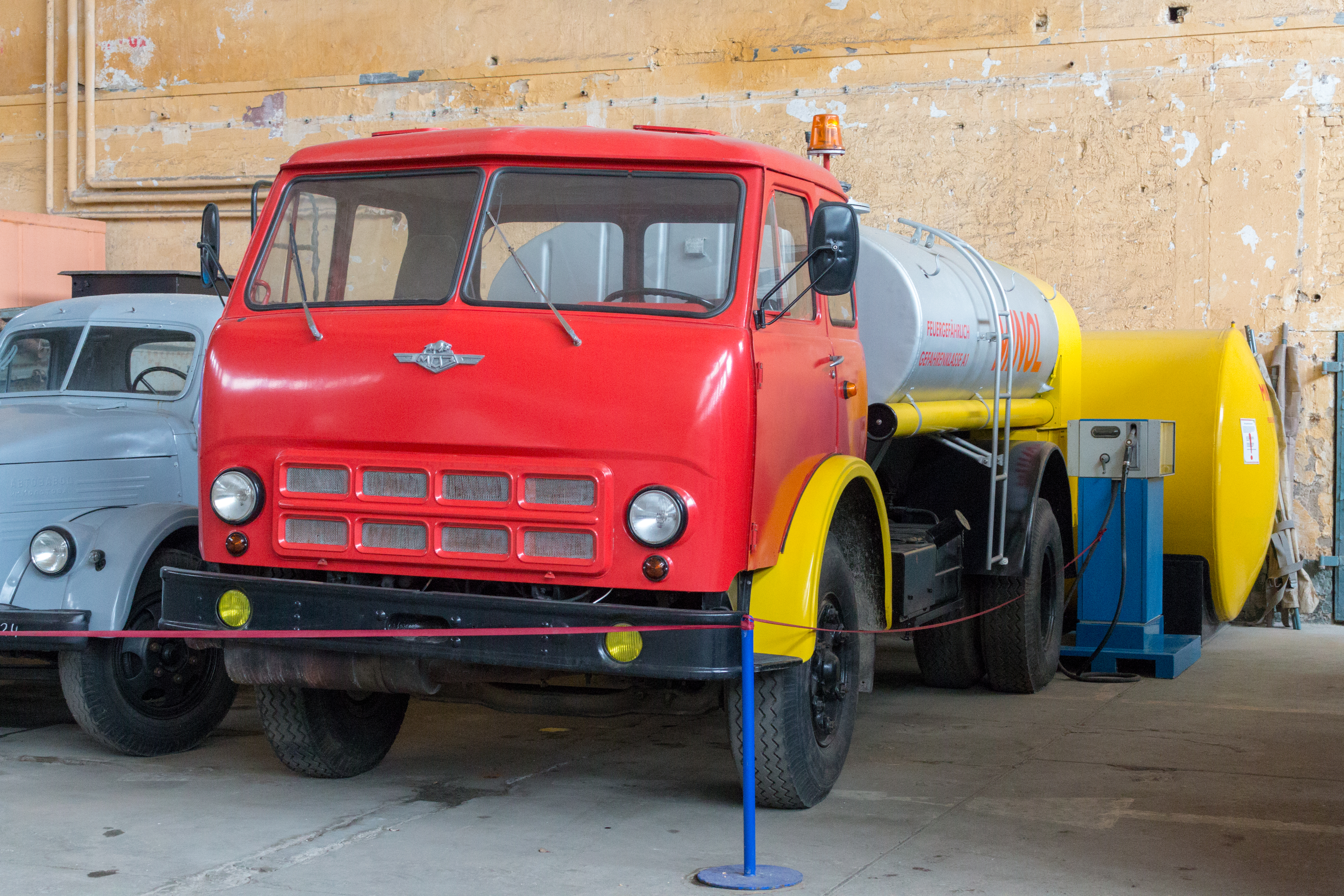
- MAZ-500A (1970–1977)

Overview
- Manufacturer: Minsk Automobile Plant
- Production: 1965–1970 (MAZ-500); 1970–1977 (MAZ-500A)
- Assembly: Minsk

Body and chassis
- Class: Cab over truck
- Layout: FR layout
- Related: MAZ-504

Powertrain
- Engine: 11.2 L YaMZ-236 diesel V6; 14.9 L YaMZ-238 diesel V8
- Transmission: 5-speed manual

Dimensions
- Wheelbase: 3,850 mm (152 in)
- Width: 2,650 mm (104 in)
- Height: 2,640 mm (104 in)
- Curb weight: 6,500 kg (14,330 lb)

Chronology
- Predecessor: MAZ-200
- Successor: MAZ-5335

MAZ-500 is a Soviet truck manufactured at the Minsk Automobile Plant. The first prototype MAZ-500 ran as early as 1955 and they were shown to the public in 1958. Delays in engine development pushed full production back to 1965, although limited production started in 1963. The MAZ-500 is a cab over truck instead of the MAZ-200's conventional layout. This was done to increase payload and reduce weight as well as reduce fuel consumption. The engine itself was quite modern, a direct injection 11,150 cc (680 cu in) diesel V6 built by the Yaroslavl Motor Plant (who had also originally developed the preceding MAZ-200 truck) with 180 PS (132 kW) at 2100 rpm. The truck's design was also innovative, with a tilting cabin, which was still rare in the West as well. It also had a number of features designed to make the truck operable under the arduous conditions found in Siberia.

The MAZ-500/500A was in production from 1963 (with full production commencing in 1965) until 1977 with modernizations taking place in 1970 and 1977. The tractor-trailer versions MAZ-514, -515, and -516 continued to be built as late as 1981, with the same upgrades as the succeeding MAZ-5335. The MAZ-5335 was a facelifted model which appeared in 1977 which was built until 1990. Models intended for heavier loads have an eight-cylinder version called YaMZ-238 with 240 PS (177 kW).

== Variants ==
=== First generation ===
- MAZ-500: Initial production version. Produced 1963–1970.
  - MAZ-500G: Long wheelbase version.
  - MAZ-500Sh: Chassis-cab version.
  - MAZ-500V: Troop carrier version, created by order of the Soviet Ministry of Defense.
- MAZ-503: Dump truck version, short wheelbase and 8 tonnes (18,000 lb) load capacity. Produced 1963–1970.
  - MAZ-503B: Similar to MAZ-503 but with a redesigned dump bed featuring a tailgate.
  - MAZ-503G/MAZ-503V: Prototype version with a bed heater.
  - MAZ-509B: Prototype all-wheel drive version of MAZ-503.
  - MAZ-510: Prototype single-seat dump truck, based on MAZ-503.
- MAZ-504: Tractor-trailer version of MAZ-500.
  - MAZ-504: Initial production version, produced 1965–1970.
  - MAZ-504B: Version for towing tipping trailers.
- MAZ-505: Prototype 4x4 version. Produced in 1962.
- MAZ-508V: Prototype four-wheel-drive version of the MAZ-504. Produced in 1962.
- MAZ-509P: Logging truck, based on MAZ-500. Produced 1966-1969, although production may have begun in 1970.
- MAZ-511: Prototype dump truck with a two-way dump bed, based on MAZ-500. Produced in 1962.
- MAZ-512 (MAZ-500S): Cold weather version. It featured an in-cab heater, a diesel-powered heater for both coolant and oil, a spotlight in the top of the cab, front fog lights and a rear headlight.
- MAZ-513 (MAZ-500Yu): Hot weather version. It featured a double roof and insulated cab.
- MAZ-514: 6x4 three-axle truck, based on MAZ-516. Built until 1978.
- MAZ-515: Prototype three-axle tractor-trailer (6x2), based on MAZ-514.
- MAZ-516: 6x2 three-axle version with a lifting third axle, the first Soviet-built truck to be thus equipped. Produced 1969–1973.
- MAZ-520: Prototype three-axle, twin-steer truck, based on MAZ-504. Produced in 1962.

== Second generation ==
- MAZ-500A: Improved MAZ-500. Produced 1970–1977.
  - MAZ-500ASh: Chassis-cab version.
  - MAZ-500AS: Polar weather version.
  - MAZ-500AYu: Hot-weather version.
- MAZ-503A: Improved MAZ-503. Produced 1970–1977.
  - MAZ-503S: Polar weather version.
- MAZ-504A: Improved MAZ-504, produced from 1970 to 1977.
  - MAZ-504S: Polar weather version based on MAZ-504A.
  - MAZ-504G: Improved MAZ-504B.
  - MAZ-504V: Long-haul version with the more powerful YaMZ-238 V8.
- MAZ-509: Logging truck, based on MAZ-500A. Produced 1969 (1970?)–1978.
- MAZ-511A: Improved version of MAZ-511 prototype.
- MAZ-514B: Improved MAZ-514.
- MAZ-515A: Improved version of MAZ-515 prototype.
  - MAZ-515V: Prototype version with rectangular headlights.
- MAZ-516A: Improved MAZ-516. Produced from 1973 until 1981, later models featuring the upgrades from the MAZ-5335.

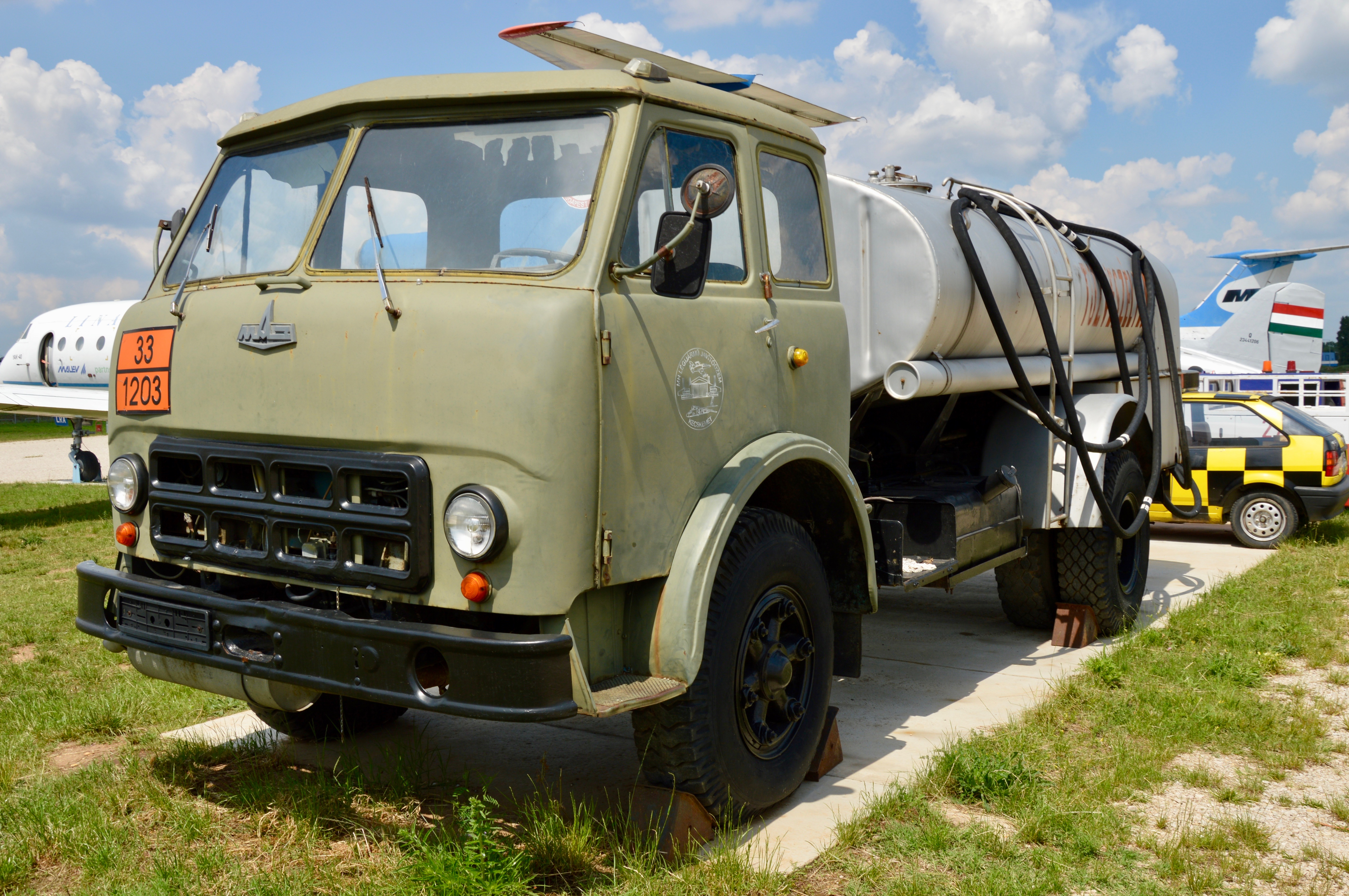
TZ-500 (MAZ-500A chassis) aircraft refueling truck

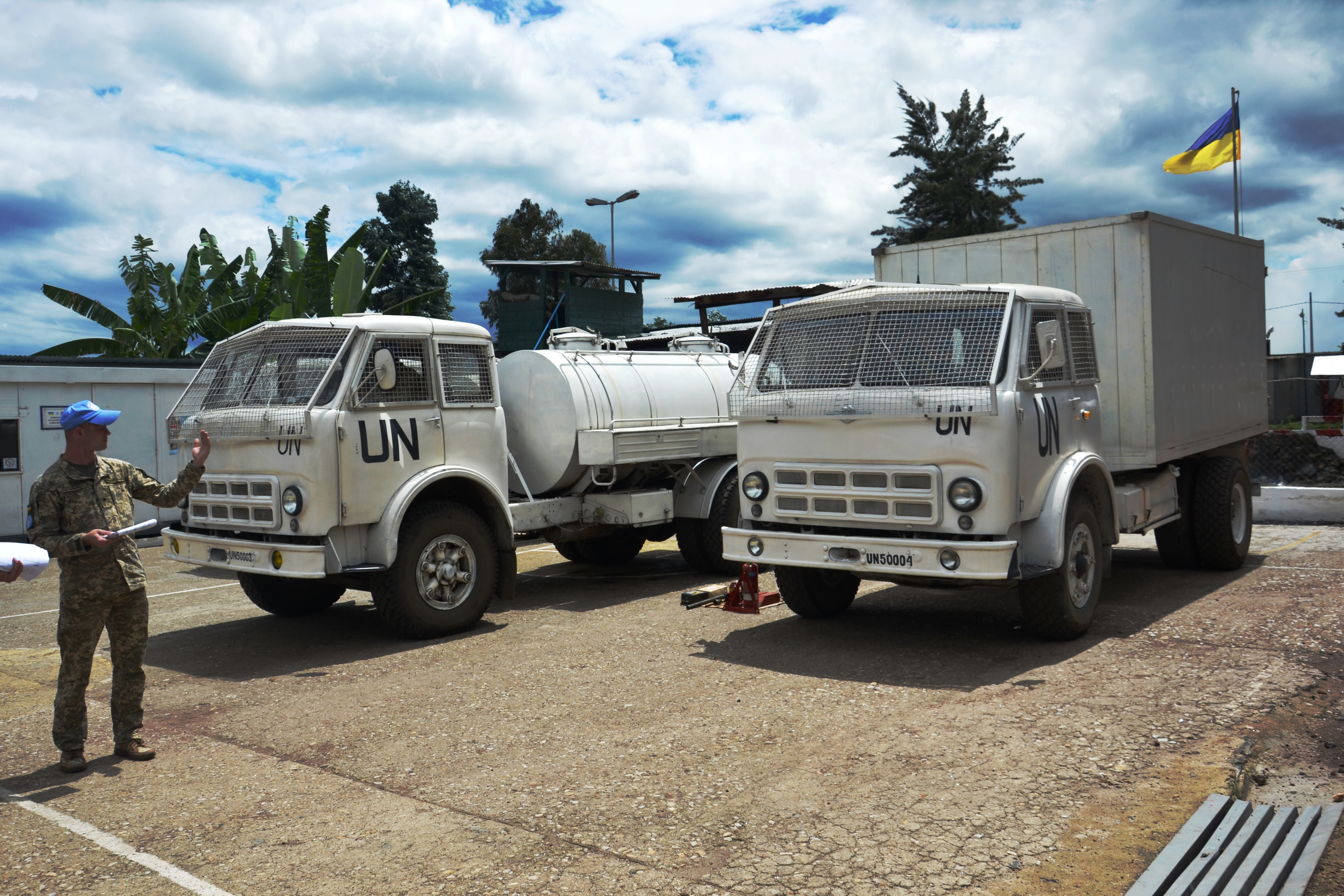
MAZ-500A

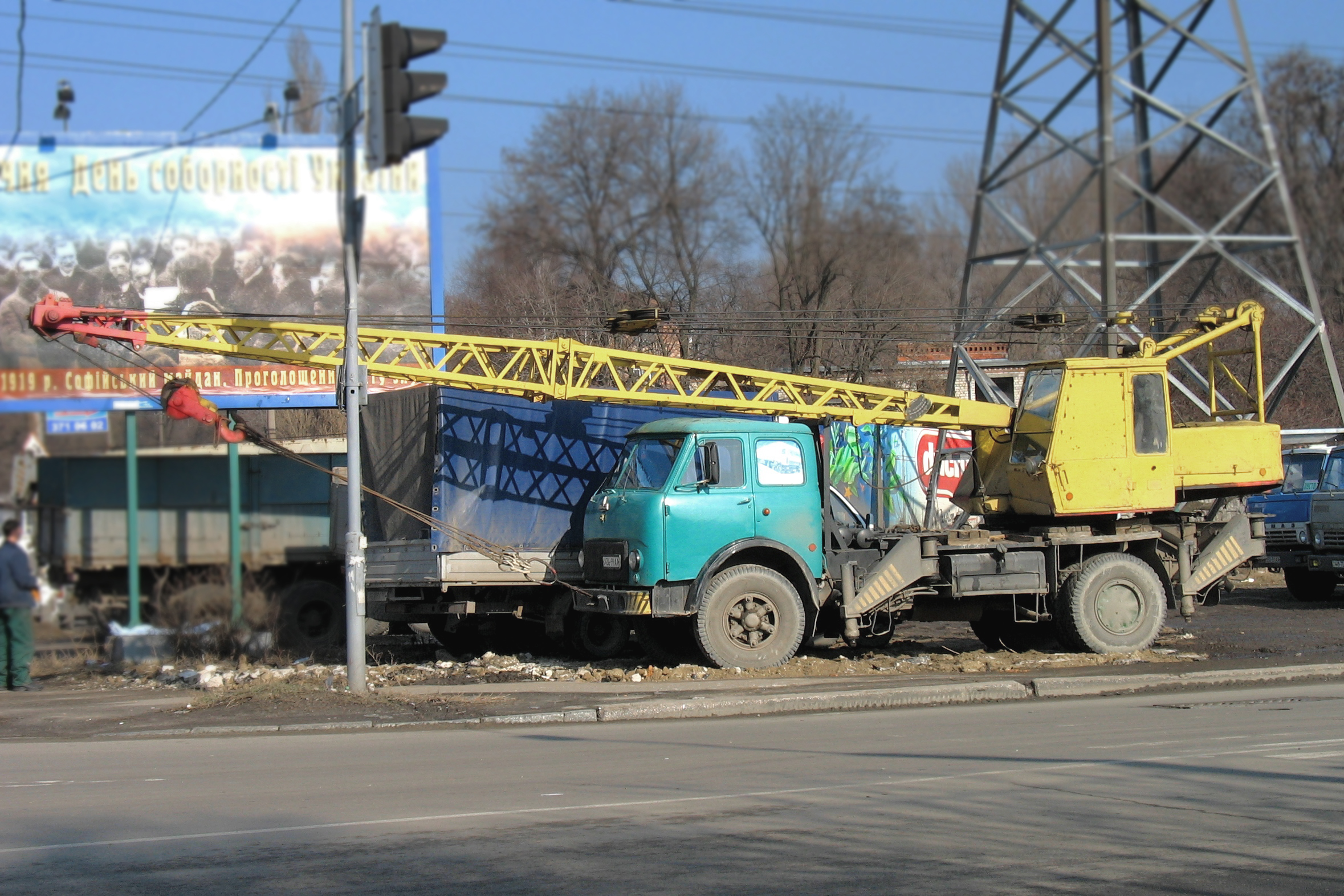
КS-3562 crane (MAZ-500A)

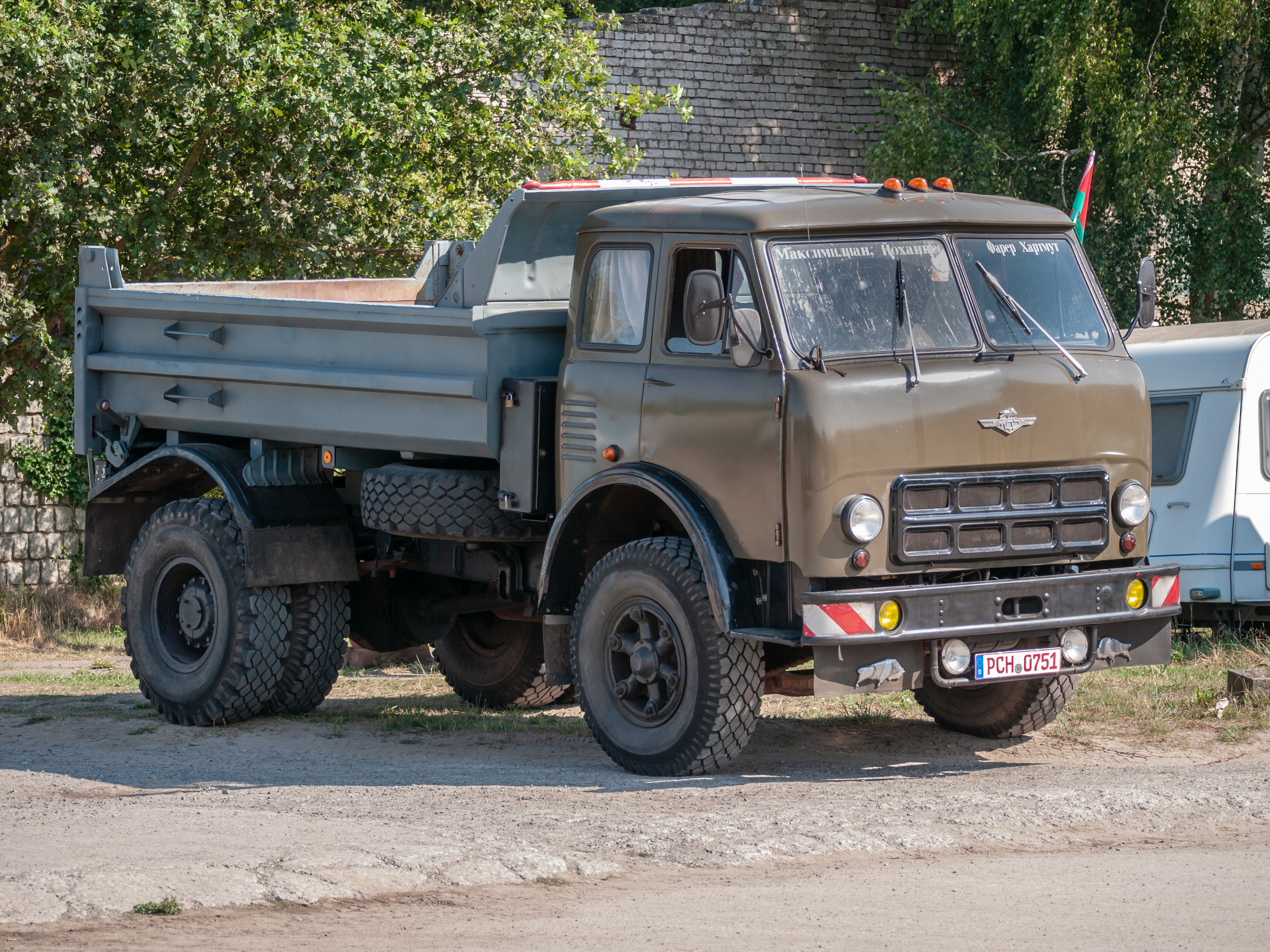
MAZ-503А

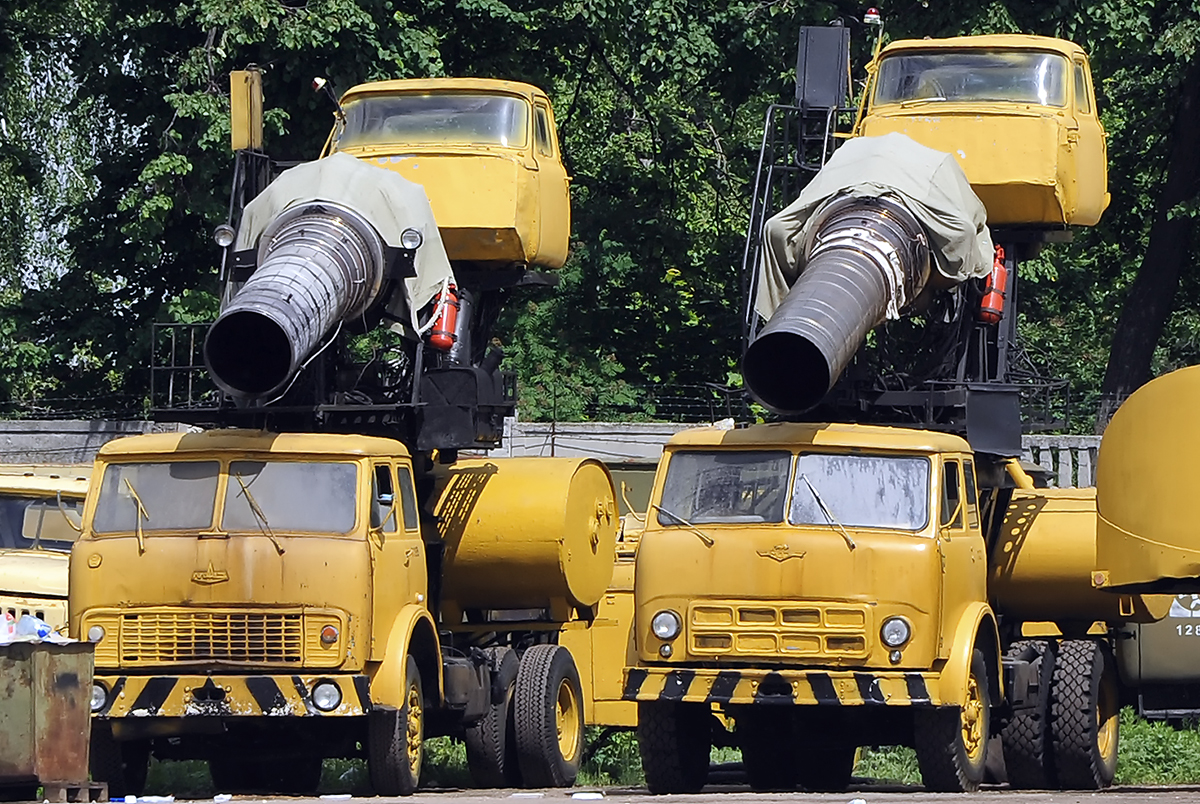
Special cars for aerodrom use. Left Truck is a MAZ-5335 (head lights integrated in front bumper), right one a MAZ-500A

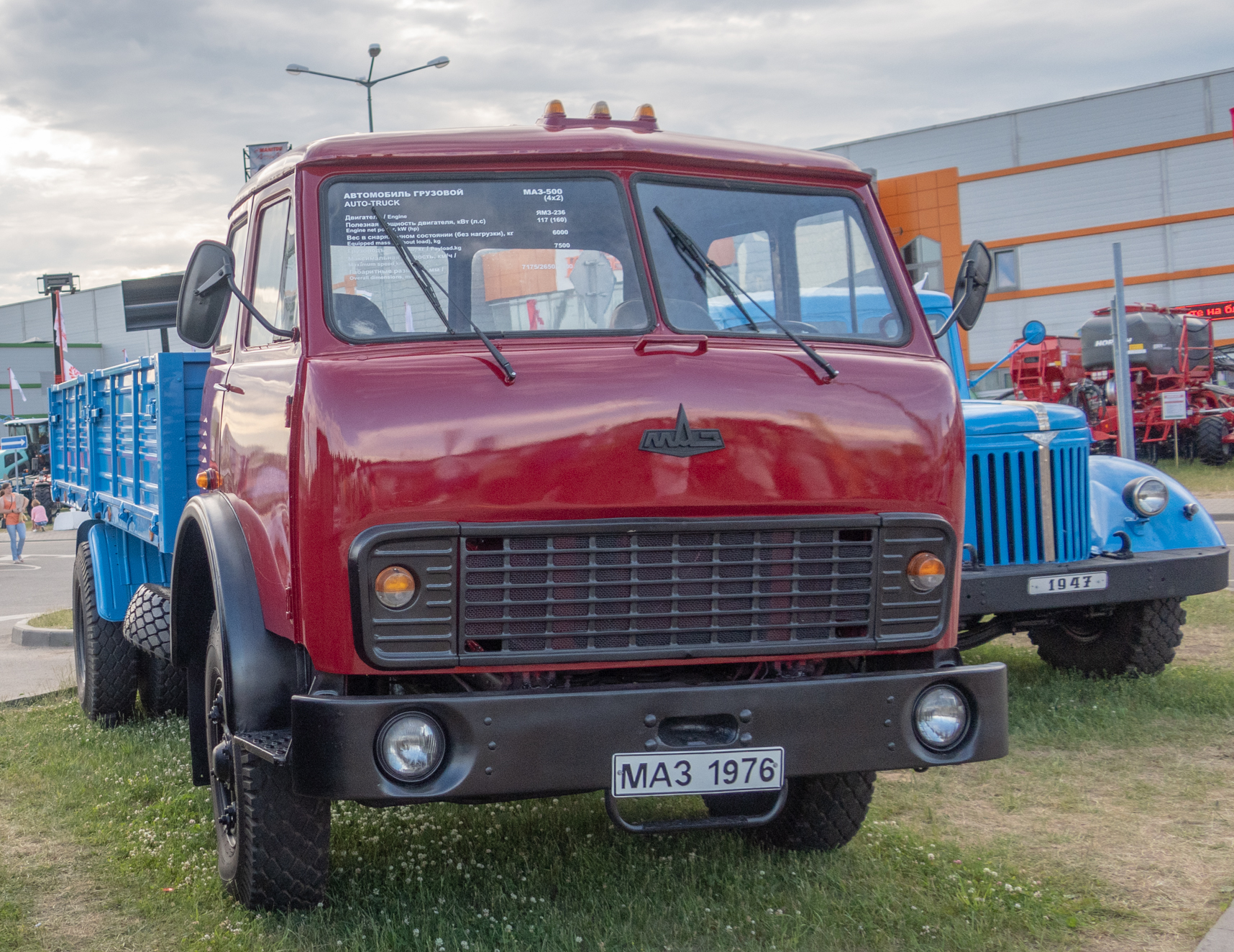
MAZ-5335
