= List of telephone country codes =

Telephone country codes are telephone number prefixes for reaching subscribers in foreign countries or areas by international direct dialing (IDD). Country codes are defined by the International Telecommunication Union (ITU) in ITU-T standards E.123 and E.164 and constitute the international telephone numbering plan of the public switched telephone network (PSTN) and other networks. In international calls, they are dialed after the international call prefixes.

== List by world numbering zones ==

=== Zone 1: North American Numbering Plan (NANP) ===
North American Numbering Plan members are assigned three-digit numbering plan area (NPA) codes under the common country code 1, shown in the format 1 (NPA). Within an NPA, all telephone numbers have seven digits.

- 1 – United States, including United States territories:
  - 1 (340) – United States Virgin Islands
  - 1 (670) – Northern Mariana Islands
  - 1 (671) – Guam
  - 1 (684) – American Samoa
  - 1 (787, 939) – Puerto Rico
- 1 – Canada
- 1 – Caribbean nations, Dutch and British Overseas Territories:
  - 1 (242) – Bahamas
  - 1 (246) – Barbados
  - 1 (264) – Anguilla
  - 1 (268) – Antigua and Barbuda
  - 1 (284) – British Virgin Islands
  - 1 (345) – Cayman Islands
  - 1 (441) – Bermuda
  - 1 (473) – Grenada
  - 1 (649) – Turks and Caicos Islands
  - 1 (658, 876) – Jamaica
  - 1 (664) – Montserrat
  - 1 (721) – Sint Maarten
  - 1 (758) – Saint Lucia
  - 1 (767) – Dominica
  - 1 (784) – Saint Vincent and the Grenadines
  - 1 (809, 829, 849) – Dominican Republic
  - 1 (868) – Trinidad and Tobago
  - 1 (869) – Saint Kitts and Nevis

=== Zone 2: Mostly Africa ===
(but also Aruba, Faroe Islands, Greenland and British Indian Ocean Territory)

- 20 – Egypt
- 210 – unassigned
- 211 – South Sudan
- 212 – Morocco (including Western Sahara)
- 213 – Algeria
- 214 – unassigned (used as ICCID code by KOREK Telecom of Iraqi Kurdistan)
- 215 – unassigned
- 216 – Tunisia
- 217 – unassigned
- 218 – Libya
- 219 – unassigned
- 220 – Gambia
- 221 – Senegal
- 222 – Mauritania
- 223 – Mali
- 224 – Guinea
- 225 – Ivory Coast
- 226 – Burkina Faso
- 227 – Niger
- 228 – Togo
- 229 – Benin
- 230 – Mauritius
- 231 – Liberia
- 232 – Sierra Leone
- 233 – Ghana
- 234 – Nigeria
- 235 – Chad
- 236 – Central African Republic
- 237 – Cameroon
- 238 – Cape Verde
- 239 – São Tomé and Príncipe
- 240 – Equatorial Guinea
- 241 – Gabon
- 242 – Republic of the Congo
- 243 – Democratic Republic of the Congo
- 244 – Angola
- 245 – Guinea-Bissau
- 246 – British Indian Ocean Territory
- 247 – Ascension Island
- 248 – Seychelles
- 249 – Sudan
- 250 – Rwanda
- 251 – Ethiopia
- 252 – Somalia (including Somaliland)
- 253 – Djibouti
- 254 – Kenya
- 255 – Tanzania
  - 255 (24) – Zanzibar, in place of never-implemented 259
- 256 – Uganda
- 257 – Burundi
- 258 – Mozambique
- 259 – unassigned (was intended for People's Republic of Zanzibar but never implemented – see 255 Tanzania)
- 260 – Zambia
- 261 – Madagascar
- 262 – Réunion
  - 262 (269, 639) – Mayotte (formerly at 269 Comoros)
- 263 – Zimbabwe
- 264 – Namibia (formerly 27 (6x) as South West Africa)
- 265 – Malawi
- 266 – Lesotho
- 267 – Botswana
- 268 – Eswatini
- 269 – Comoros (formerly assigned to Mayotte, now at 262)
- 27 – South Africa
- 28x – unassigned (reserved for country code expansion)
- 290 – Saint Helena
  - 290 (8) – Tristan da Cunha
- 291 – Eritrea
- 292 – unassigned
- 293 – unassigned
- 294 – unassigned
- 295 – unassigned (formerly assigned to San Marino, now at 378)
- 296 – unassigned
- 297 – Aruba
- 298 – Faroe Islands
- 299 – Greenland

=== Zones 3 and 4: Mostly Europe ===
The larger countries were assigned two-digit codes starting in 1960. Subsequently, beginning in 1964, smaller countries were assigned three-digit codes, which also has been the practice since the 1980s.

- 30 – Greece
- 31 – Netherlands
- 32 – Belgium
- 33 – France
- 34 – Spain
- 350 – Gibraltar
- 351 – Portugal
- 352 – Luxembourg
- 353 – Ireland
- 354 – Iceland
- 355 – Albania
- 356 – Malta
- 357 – Cyprus (including Akrotiri and Dhekelia)
- 358 – Finland
  - 358 (18) – Åland
- 359 – Bulgaria
- 36 – Hungary (formerly assigned to Turkey, now at 90)
- 37 – formerly assigned to East Germany until its reunification with West Germany, now part of 49 Germany
- 370 – Lithuania
- 371 – Latvia
- 372 – Estonia
- 373 – Moldova
- 374 – Armenia
- 375 – Belarus
- 376 – Andorra (formerly 33 628)
- 377 – Monaco (formerly 33 93)
- 378 – San Marino (interchangeably with 39 0549; earlier was allocated 295 but never used)
- 379 – Vatican City (assigned but uses 39 06698).
- 38 – formerly assigned to Yugoslavia until its break-up in 1991
- 380 – Ukraine
- 381 – Serbia
- 382 – Montenegro
- 383 – Kosovo
- 384 – unassigned
- 385 – Croatia
- 386 – Slovenia
- 387 – Bosnia and Herzegovina
- 388 – unassigned (formerly assigned to the European Telephony Numbering Space)
- 389 – North Macedonia
- 39 – Italy
  - 39 (0549) – San Marino (interchangeably with 378)
  - 39 (06 698) – Vatican City (assigned 379 but not in use)
- 40 – Romania
- 41 – Switzerland
  - 41 (91) – Campione d'Italia, an Italian enclave. 91 is the prefix for the Swiss canton Ticino in which the enclave resides. Its phone system is fully integrated into the Swiss system.
- 42 – formerly assigned to Czechoslovakia, later to its breakup successors (CZ, SK) until 1997
- 420 – Czech Republic
- 421 – Slovakia
- 422 – unassigned
- 423 – Liechtenstein (formerly 41 75)
- 424 – unassigned
- 425 – unassigned
- 426 – unassigned
- 427 – unassigned
- 428 – unassigned
- 429 – unassigned
- 43 – Austria
- 44 – United Kingdom
  - 44 (1481) – Guernsey
  - 44 (1534) – Jersey
  - 44 (1624) – Isle of Man
- 45 – Denmark
- 46 – Sweden
- 47 – Norway
  - 47 (79) – Svalbard
- 48 – Poland
- 49 – Germany

=== Zone 5: South and Central Americas ===
- 500 – Falkland Islands
  - 500 – South Georgia and the South Sandwich Islands
- 501 – Belize
- 502 – Guatemala
- 503 – El Salvador
- 504 – Honduras
- 505 – Nicaragua
- 506 – Costa Rica
- 507 – Panama
- 508 – Saint-Pierre and Miquelon
- 509 – Haiti
- 51 – Peru
- 52 – Mexico
- 53 – Cuba
- 54 – Argentina
- 55 – Brazil
- 56 – Chile
- 57 – Colombia
- 58 – Venezuela
- 590 – Guadeloupe (including Saint Barthélemy, Saint Martin)
- 591 – Bolivia
- 592 – Guyana
- 593 – Ecuador
- 594 – French Guiana
- 595 – Paraguay
- 596 – Martinique (formerly assigned to Peru, now 51)
- 597 – Suriname
- 598 – Uruguay
- 599 – Former Netherlands Antilles, now grouped as follows:
  - 599 3 – Sint Eustatius
  - 599 4 – Saba
  - 599 5 – unassigned (formerly assigned to Sint Maarten, now included in NANP as 1 (721))
  - 599 7 – Bonaire
  - 599 8 – unassigned (formerly assigned to Aruba, now at 297)
  - 599 9 – Curaçao

=== Zone 6: Southeast Asia and Oceania ===
- 60 – Malaysia
- 61 – Australia (see also 672 below)
  - 61 (8 9162) – Cocos Islands
  - 61 (8 9164) – Christmas Island
- 62 – Indonesia
- 63 – Philippines
- 64 – New Zealand
  - 64 – Pitcairn Islands
- 65 – Singapore
- 66 – Thailand
- 670 – East Timor (formerly 62/39 during the Indonesian occupation; formerly assigned to Northern Mariana Islands, now part of NANP as 1 (670))
- 671 – unassigned (formerly assigned to Guam, now part of NANP as 1 (671))
- 672 – Australian External Territories (see also 61 Australia above); formerly assigned to Portuguese Timor (see 670)
  - 672 (1) – (Australia) Australian Antarctic Territory
  - 672 (3) – Norfolk Island
- 673 – Brunei
- 674 – Nauru
- 675 – Papua New Guinea
- 676 – Tonga
- 677 – Solomon Islands
- 678 – Vanuatu
- 679 – Fiji
- 680 – Palau
- 681 – Wallis and Futuna
- 682 – Cook Islands
- 683 – Niue
- 684 – unassigned (formerly assigned to American Samoa, now part of NANP as 1 (684))
- 685 – Samoa
- 686 – Kiribati
- 687 – New Caledonia
- 688 – Tuvalu
- 689 – French Polynesia
- 690 – Tokelau
- 691 – Federated States of Micronesia
- 692 – Marshall Islands
- 693 – unassigned
- 694 – unassigned
- 695 – unassigned
- 696 – unassigned
- 697 – unassigned
- 698 – unassigned
- 699 – unassigned

=== Zone 7: Russia and neighboring regions ===
Formerly assigned to the Soviet Union until its dissolution in 1991.

- 7 (1–5, 8–9) – Russia
  - 7 (840, 940) – Abkhazia (formerly 995 (44))
  - 7 (850, 929) – South Ossetia (formerly 995 (34))
- 7 (0, 6–7) – Kazakhstan (reserved 997 but abandoned in November 2023)

=== Zone 8: East Asia, Southeast Asia, and special services ===
- 800 – Universal International Freephone Service
- 801 – unassigned
- 802 – unassigned
- 803 – unassigned
- 804 – unassigned
- 805 – unassigned
- 806 – unassigned
- 807 – unassigned
- 808 – Universal International Shared Cost Numbers
- 809 – unassigned
- 81 – Japan
- 82 – South Korea
- 83x – unassigned (reserved for country code expansion)
- 84 – Vietnam
- 850 – North Korea
- 851 – unassigned
- 852 – Hong Kong
- 853 – Macau
- 854 – unassigned
- 855 – Cambodia
- 856 – Laos
- 857 – unassigned (formerly assigned to ANAC satellite service)
- 858 – unassigned (formerly assigned to ANAC satellite service)
- 859 – unassigned
- 86 – China
- 870 – Global Mobile Satellite System (Inmarsat)
- 871 – unassigned (formerly assigned to Inmarsat Atlantic East, discontinued in 2008)
- 872 – unassigned (formerly assigned to Inmarsat Pacific, discontinued in 2008)
- 873 – unassigned (formerly assigned to Inmarsat Indian, discontinued in 2008)
- 874 – unassigned (formerly assigned to Inmarsat Atlantic West, discontinued in 2008)
- 875 – unassigned (reserved for future maritime mobile service)
- 876 – unassigned (reserved for future maritime mobile service)
- 877 – unassigned (reserved for future maritime mobile service)
- 878 – unassigned (formerly used for Universal Personal Telecommunications Service, discontinued in 2022)
- 879 – unassigned (reserved for national non-commercial purposes)
- 880 – Bangladesh
- 881 – Global Mobile Satellite System
- 882 – International Networks
- 883 – International Networks
- 884 – unassigned
- 885 – unassigned
- 886 – Taiwan
- 887 – unassigned
- 888 – unassigned (formerly assigned to OCHA for Telecommunications for Disaster Relief service)
- 889 – unassigned
- 89x – unassigned (reserved for country code expansion)

=== Zone 9: West, Central, and South Asia ===
- 90 – Turkey
  - 90 (392) – Northern Cyprus
- 91 – India
  - 91 (191) – Jammu
  - 91 (194) – Kashmir
- 92 – Pakistan
  - 92 (581) – Gilgit-Baltistan
  - 92 (582) – Azad Kashmir
- 93 – Afghanistan
- 94 – Sri Lanka
- 95 – Myanmar
- 960 – Maldives
- 961 – Lebanon
- 962 – Jordan
- 963 – Syria
- 964 – Iraq
- 965 – Kuwait
- 966 – Saudi Arabia
- 967 – Yemen
- 968 – Oman
- 969 – unassigned (formerly assigned to South Yemen until its unification with North Yemen, now part of 967 Yemen)
- 970 – Palestine (interchangeably with 972)
- 971 – United Arab Emirates
- 972 – Israel (also Palestine, interchangeably with 970)
- 973 – Bahrain
- 974 – Qatar
- 975 – Bhutan
- 976 – Mongolia
- 977 – Nepal
- 978 – unassigned (formerly assigned to Dubai, now part of 971 United Arab Emirates)
- 979 – Universal International Premium Rate Service (UIPRS); (formerly assigned to Abu Dhabi, now part of 971 United Arab Emirates)
- 98 – Iran
- 990 – unassigned
- 991 – unassigned (formerly used for International Telecommunications Public Correspondence Service)
- 992 – Tajikistan
- 993 – Turkmenistan
- 994 – Azerbaijan
- 995 – Georgia
  - 995 (34) – formerly South Ossetia (now 7 (850, 929))
  - 995 (44) – formerly Abkhazia (now 7 (840, 940))
- 996 – Kyrgyzstan
- 997 – Kazakhstan (reserved but abandoned in November 2023; uses 7 (6xx, 7xx))
- 998 – Uzbekistan
- 999 – unassigned (reserved for future global service)

== Alphabetical order ==
Serving	Code	Time (UTC ±)	
Serving	Code	Zone	DST
Abkhazia	7 (840, 940)	+03:00	
Afghanistan	93	+04:30	
Åland	358 (18)	+02:00	+03:00
Albania	355	+01:00	+02:00
Algeria	213	+01:00	
American Samoa	1 (684)	−11:00	
Andorra	376	+01:00	+02:00
Angola	244	+01:00	
Anguilla	1 (264)	−04:00	
Antigua and Barbuda	1 (268)	−04:00	
Argentina	54	−03:00	
Armenia	374	+04:00	
Aruba	297	−04:00	
Ascension	247	+00:00	
Australia	61	+08:00 to +10:30	+08:00 to +11:00
Austria	43	+01:00	+02:00
Azerbaijan	994	+04:00	
Bahamas	1 (242)	−05:00	−04:00
Bahrain	973	+03:00	
Bangladesh	880	+06:00	
Barbados	1 (246)	−04:00	
Belarus	375	+03:00	
Belgium	32	+01:00	+02:00
Belize	501	−06:00	
Benin	229	+01:00	
Bermuda	1 (441)	−04:00	−03:00
Bhutan	975	+06:00	
Bolivia	591	−04:00	
Bonaire	599 (7)	−04:00	
Bosnia and Herzegovina	387	+01:00	+02:00
Botswana	267	+02:00	
Brazil	55	−05:00 to –02:00	
British Indian Ocean Territory (Diego Garcia)	246	+06:00	
British Virgin Islands	1 (284)	−04:00	
Brunei Darussalam	673	+08:00	
Bulgaria	359	+02:00	+03:00
Burkina Faso	226	+00:00	
Burundi	257	+02:00	
Cape Verde	238	−01:00	
Cambodia	855	+07:00	
Cameroon	237	+01:00	
Canada	1	−08:00 to –03:30	−07:00 to –02:30
Caribbean Netherlands	599 (3, 4, 7)	−04:00	
Cayman Islands	1 (345)	−05:00	
Central African Republic	236	+01:00	
Chad	235	+01:00	
Chile	56	−06:00 to –04:00	−05:00 to –03:00
China	86	+08:00	
Christmas Island	61 (89164)	+07:00	
Cocos (Keeling) Islands	61 (89162)	+06:30	
Colombia	57	−05:00	
Comoros	269	+03:00	
Congo	242	+01:00	
Congo, Democratic Republic of the	243	+01:00 to +02:00	
Cook Islands	682	−10:00	
Costa Rica	506	−06:00	
Ivory Coast (Côte d'Ivoire)	225	+00:00	
Croatia	385	+01:00	+02:00
Cuba	53	−05:00	−04:00
Curaçao	599 (9)	−04:00	
Cyprus	357	+02:00	+03:00
Czech Republic	420	+01:00	+02:00
Denmark	45	+01:00	+02:00
Djibouti	253	+03:00	
Dominica	1 (767)	−04:00	
Dominican Republic	1 (809, 829, 849)	−04:00	
Easter Island	56	−06:00	−05:00
Ecuador	593	−06:00 to –05:00	
Egypt	20	+02:00	+03:00
El Salvador	503	−06:00	
Ellipso (Mobile Satellite service)	881 (2, 3)		
EMSAT (Mobile Satellite service)	882 (13)		
Equatorial Guinea	240	+01:00	
Eritrea	291	+03:00	
Estonia	372	+02:00	+03:00
Eswatini	268	+02:00	
Ethiopia	251	+03:00	
Falkland Islands	500	−03:00	
Faroe Islands	298	+00:00	+01:00
Fiji	679	+12:00	+13:00
Finland	358	+02:00	+03:00
France	33	+01:00	+02:00
French Antilles	596		
French Guiana	594	−03:00	
French Polynesia	689	−10:00 to –09:00	
Gabon	241	+01:00	
Gambia	220	+00:00	
Georgia	995	+04:00	
Germany	49	+01:00	+02:00
Ghana	233	+00:00	
Gibraltar	350	+01:00	+02:00
Global Mobile Satellite System (GMSS)	881		
Globalstar (Mobile Satellite Service)	881 (8, 9)		
Greece	30	+02:00	+03:00
Greenland	299	−04:00 to +01:00	−03:00 to +00:00
Grenada	1 (473)	−04:00	
Guadeloupe	590	−04:00	
Guam	1 (671)	+10:00	
Guatemala	502	−06:00	
Guernsey	44 (1481, 7781, 7839, 7911)	+00:00	+01:00
Guinea	224	+00:00	
Guinea-Bissau	245	+00:00	
Guyana	592	−04:00	
Haiti	509	−05:00	−04:00
Honduras	504	−06:00	
Hong Kong	852	+08:00	
Hungary	36	+01:00	+02:00
Iceland	354	+00:00	
ICO Global (Mobile Satellite Service)	881 (0, 1)		
India	91	+05:30	
Indonesia	62	+07:00 to +09:00	
Inmarsat SNAC	870		
International Freephone Service (UIFN)	800		
International Networks	882, 883		
International Premium Rate Service	979		
International Shared Cost Service (ISCS)	808		
Iran	98	+03:30	+04:30
Iraq	964	+03:00	
Ireland	353	+00:00	+01:00
Iridium (Mobile Satellite service)	881 (6, 7)		
Isle of Man	44 (1624, 7524, 7624, 7924)	+00:00	+01:00
Israel	972	+02:00	+03:00
Italy	39	+01:00	+02:00
Jamaica	1 (658, 876)	−05:00	
Jan Mayen	47 (79)	+01:00	+02:00
Japan	81	+09:00	
Jersey	44 (1534)	+00:00	+01:00
Jordan	962	+02:00	+03:00
Kazakhstan	7 (6, 7) (997 assigned but now abandoned)	+05:00	
Kenya	254	+03:00	
Kiribati	686	+12:00 to +14:00	
Korea, North	850	+09:00	
Korea, South	82	+09:00	
Kosovo	383	+01:00	+02:00
Kuwait	965	+03:00	
Kyrgyzstan	996	+06:00	
Laos	856	+07:00	
Latvia	371	+02:00	+03:00
Lebanon	961	+02:00	+03:00
Lesotho	266	+02:00	
Liberia	231	+00:00	
Libya	218	+02:00	
Liechtenstein	423	+01:00	+02:00
Lithuania	370	+02:00	+03:00
Luxembourg	352	+01:00	+02:00
Macau	853	+08:00	
Madagascar	261	+03:00	
Malawi	265	+02:00	
Malaysia	60	+08:00	
Maldives	960	+05:00	
Mali	223	+00:00	
Malta	356	+01:00	+02:00
Marshall Islands	692	+12:00	
Martinique	596	−04:00	
Mauritania	222	+00:00	
Mauritius	230	+04:00	
Mayotte	262 (269, 639)	+03:00	
Mexico	52	−08:00 to –05:00	−07:00 to –05:00
Micronesia, Federated States of	691	+10:00 to +11:00	
Moldova	373	+02:00	+03:00
Monaco	377	+01:00	+02:00
Mongolia	976	+07:00 to +08:00	
Montenegro	382	+01:00	+02:00
Montserrat	1 (664)	−04:00	
Morocco	212	+01:00	
Mozambique	258	+02:00	
Myanmar	95	+06:30	
Namibia	264	+02:00	
Nauru	674	+12:00	
Nepal	977	+05:45	
Netherlands	31	+01:00	+02:00
Nevis	1 (869)	−04:00	
New Caledonia	687	+11:00	
New Zealand	64	+12:00	+13:00
Nicaragua	505	−06:00	
Niger	227	+01:00	
Nigeria	234	+01:00	
Niue	683	−11:00	
Norfolk Island	672 (3)	+11:00	
North Macedonia	389	+01:00	+02:00
Northern Cyprus	90 (392)	+02:00	+03:00
Northern Ireland	44 (28)	+00:00	+01:00
Northern Mariana Islands	1 (670)	+10:00	
Norway	47	+01:00	+02:00
Oman	968	+04:00	
Pakistan	92	+05:00	
Palau	680	+09:00	
Palestine	970	+02:00	+03:00
Panama	507	−05:00	
Papua New Guinea	675	+10:00 to +11:00	
Paraguay	595	−04:00	−03:00
Peru	51	−05:00	
Philippines	63	+08:00	
Pitcairn Islands	64	−08:00	
Poland	48	+01:00	+02:00
Portugal	351	+00:00	+01:00
Puerto Rico	1 (787, 939)	−04:00	
Qatar	974	+03:00	
Réunion	262	+04:00	
Romania	40	+02:00	+03:00
Russia	7	+02:00 to +12:00	
Rwanda	250	+02:00	
Saba	599 (4)	−04:00	
Saint Barthélemy	590	−04:00	
Saint Helena	290	+00:00	
Saint Kitts and Nevis	1 (869)	−04:00	
Saint Lucia	1 (758)	−04:00	
Saint Martin (France)	590	−04:00	
Saint Pierre and Miquelon	508	−03:00	−02:00
Saint Vincent and the Grenadines	1 (784)	−04:00	
Samoa	685	+13:00	+14:00
San Marino	378	+01:00	+02:00
São Tomé and Príncipe	239	+00:00	
Saudi Arabia	966	+03:00	
Senegal	221	+00:00	
Serbia	381	+01:00	+02:00
Seychelles	248	+04:00	
Sierra Leone	232	+00:00	
Singapore	65	+08:00	
Sint Eustatius	599 (3)	−04:00	
Sint Maarten (Netherlands)	1 (721)	−04:00	
Slovakia	421	+01:00	+02:00
Slovenia	386	+01:00	+02:00
Solomon Islands	677	+11:00	
Somalia	252	+03:00	
South Africa	27	+02:00	
South Georgia and the South Sandwich Islands	500	−02:00	
South Ossetia	7 (850, 929)	+03:00	
South Sudan	211	+02:00	
Spain	34	+01:00	+02:00
Sri Lanka	94	+05:30	
Sudan	249	+02:00	
Suriname	597	−03:00	
Svalbard	47 (79)	+01:00	+02:00
Sweden	46	+01:00	+02:00
Switzerland	41	+01:00	+02:00
Syria	963	+02:00	+03:00
Taiwan	886	+08:00	
Tajikistan	992	+05:00	
Tanzania	255	+03:00	
Thailand	66	+07:00	
Thuraya (Mobile Satellite service)	882 (16)		
East Timor (Timor-Leste)	670	+09:00	
Togo	228	+00:00	
Tokelau	690	+13:00	
Tonga	676	+13:00	
Transnistria	373 (2, 5)	+02:00	+03:00
Trinidad and Tobago	1 (868)	−04:00	
Tristan da Cunha	290 (8)	+00:00	
Tunisia	216	+01:00	
Turkey	90	+03:00	
Turkmenistan	993	+05:00	
Turks and Caicos Islands	1 (649)	−05:00	−04:00
Tuvalu	688	+12:00	
Uganda	256	+03:00	
Ukraine	380	+02:00	+03:00
United Arab Emirates	971	+04:00	
United Kingdom	44	+00:00	+01:00
United States	1	−10:00 to –05:00	−10:00 to –04:00
Uruguay	598	−03:00	
US Virgin Islands	1 (340)	−04:00	
Uzbekistan	998	+05:00	
Vanuatu	678	+11:00	
Vatican City State (Holy See)	39 (06698), assigned 379	+01:00	+02:00
Venezuela	58	−04:00	
Vietnam	84	+07:00	
Wake Island, USA	1 (808)	+12:00	
Wallis and Futuna	681	+12:00	
Yemen	967	+03:00	
Zambia	260	+02:00	
Zanzibar	255 (24)	+03:00	
Zimbabwe	263	+02:00	

== Locations without dedicated country code ==
=== Antarctica ===
In Antarctica, telecommunication services are generally provided by the parent country of each base, though some bases have service (and numbering) through more than one country:

Base	Calling code	Country	Note
Almirante Brown Antarctic Base	54	Argentina	
Amundsen–Scott South Pole Station	1	United States	
Artigas Base	598	Uruguay	
Asuka Station	81	Japan	
Base Presidente Eduardo Frei Montalva and Villa Las Estrellas	56	Chile	
Belgrano II	54	Argentina	
Bellingshausen Station	7	Russia	
Bernardo O'Higgins Station	56	Chile	
Byrd Station	1	United States	
Captain Arturo Prat Base	56	Chile	
Casey Station	672	Australia	Can be direct dialed.
Comandante Ferraz Brazilian Antarctic Base	55	Brazil	
Concordia Station	39; 33	France; Italy	
Davis Station	672	Australia	Can be direct dialed.
Dome Fuji Station	81	Japan	
Dumont d'Urville Station	33	France	
Esperanza Base	54	Argentina	
Gabriel de Castilla Spanish Antarctic Station	34	Spain	
Georg von Neumayer Station (replaced by Neumayer Station III)	49	Germany	
Gonzalez Videla Station	56	Chile	
Great Wall Station	86	China	
Halley Research Station	44	United Kingdom	
Henryk Arctowski Polish Antarctic Station	48	Poland	
Jang Bogo Station	82	South Korea	
Jinnah Antarctic Station	92	Pakistan	
Juan Carlos I Base	34	Spain	
Jubany	54	Argentina	
King Sejong Station	82	South Korea	
Kohnen-Station	49	Germany	
Kunlun Station	852	China	
Law-Racoviță-Negoiță Station	40	Romania	
Leningradskaya Station	7	Russia	
Machu Picchu Research Station	51	Peru	
Macquarie Island Station	672	Australia	Can be direct dialed.
Maitri Station	91	India	
Marambio Base	54	Argentina	
Mario Zucchelli Station	39	Italy	
Mawson Station	672	Australia	Can be direct dialed.
McMurdo Station	1-720-568; 64-240-9	United States	Common numbering between McMurdo Station and Scott Base. McMurdo supervisors direct-dial US Denver numbers. All extensions have direct-dial NZ numbers in a special area code.
Mendel Polar Station	420	Czech Republic	
Mirny Station	7	Russia	
Mizuho Station	81	Japan	
Molodyozhnaya Station	7; 375	Belarus; Russia	
Neumayer Station III	49	Germany	
Novolazarevskaya Station	7	Russia	
Orcadas Base	54	Argentina	
Palmer Station	1	United States	
Princess Elisabeth Base	32	Belgium	
Professor Julio Escudero Base	56	Chile	
Progress Station	7	Russia	
Rothera Research Station	44	United Kingdom	
Russkaya Station	7	Russia	
San Martín Base	54	Argentina	
SANAE IV (South African National Antarctic Expeditions)	27	South Africa	
Scott Base	64-240-9	New Zealand	Common numbering between McMurdo Station and Scott Base. All extensions have direct-dial NZ numbers in a special area code.
Showa Station	81	Japan	
Signy Research Station	44	United Kingdom	
St. Kliment Ohridski Base	359	Bulgaria	
Svea	46	Sweden	
Tor Station	47	Norway	
Troll Station	47	Norway	
Vernadsky Research Base	380	Ukraine	
Vostok Station	7	Russia	
Wasa Research Station	46	Sweden	
Zhongshan Station	86	China	

=== Other ===
These places have no country code of their own, although one may be reserved:

Location	Country code	Country	Reasons for no code
Kerguelen Islands	262	France	No permanent local switches. Country Code 262 is assigned to Réunion, which administers all of the French Southern and Antarctic Lands (including these islands).
Pitcairn Islands	64	Pitcairn Islands	On-island phone network is connected to and uses numbering from an exchange in New Zealand.

== See also ==
- List of international call prefixes
- National conventions for writing telephone numbers
