= Telephone numbers in Samoa =

- Country: Samoa
- Continent: Oceania
- NSN length: 5, 6, 7
- Format: +685 XX XXX; +685 XX XX XX; +685 XXX XXXX
- Country code: +685
- International access: 0

Telephone numbers in Samoa use the country calling code +685 and the international call prefix 0. The numbering plan uses numbers of varying lengths: fixed-line numbers are five digits and are allocated to areas including Apia, Upolu, and Savai'i, while mobile services use several seven-digit ranges as well as a ten-digit range. Six-digit numbers are used for toll-free services, and three-digit numbers are allocated to special services.

== Numbering in Samoa ==
National Significant Numbers (NSN):

Minimum number length (excluding the country code): three digits
Maximum number length (excluding the country code): seven digits

Format: +685 XX XXX or +685 XX XX XX or +685 XXX XXXX

Number range allocation in Samoa is as follows:

Range	Number length	Usage	Additional information
0		International call prefix	
2x xxx	5	Fixed line services	Apia area
3x xxx	5	Fixed line services	Apia area
4x xxx	5	Fixed line services	Upolu
5x xxx	5	Fixed line services	Savaii
6x xxx	5	Fixed line services	Apia
7x xx xxx	7	Mobile services	
800 xxx	6	Toll-free services	
83 xx xxx – 87 xx xxx	7	Mobile services	
89 xx xx xx xx	10	Mobile services	
9xx	3	Special services	

== See also ==
- Telecommunications in Samoa
