= Telephone numbers in Suriname =

Telephone numbering system in Suriname

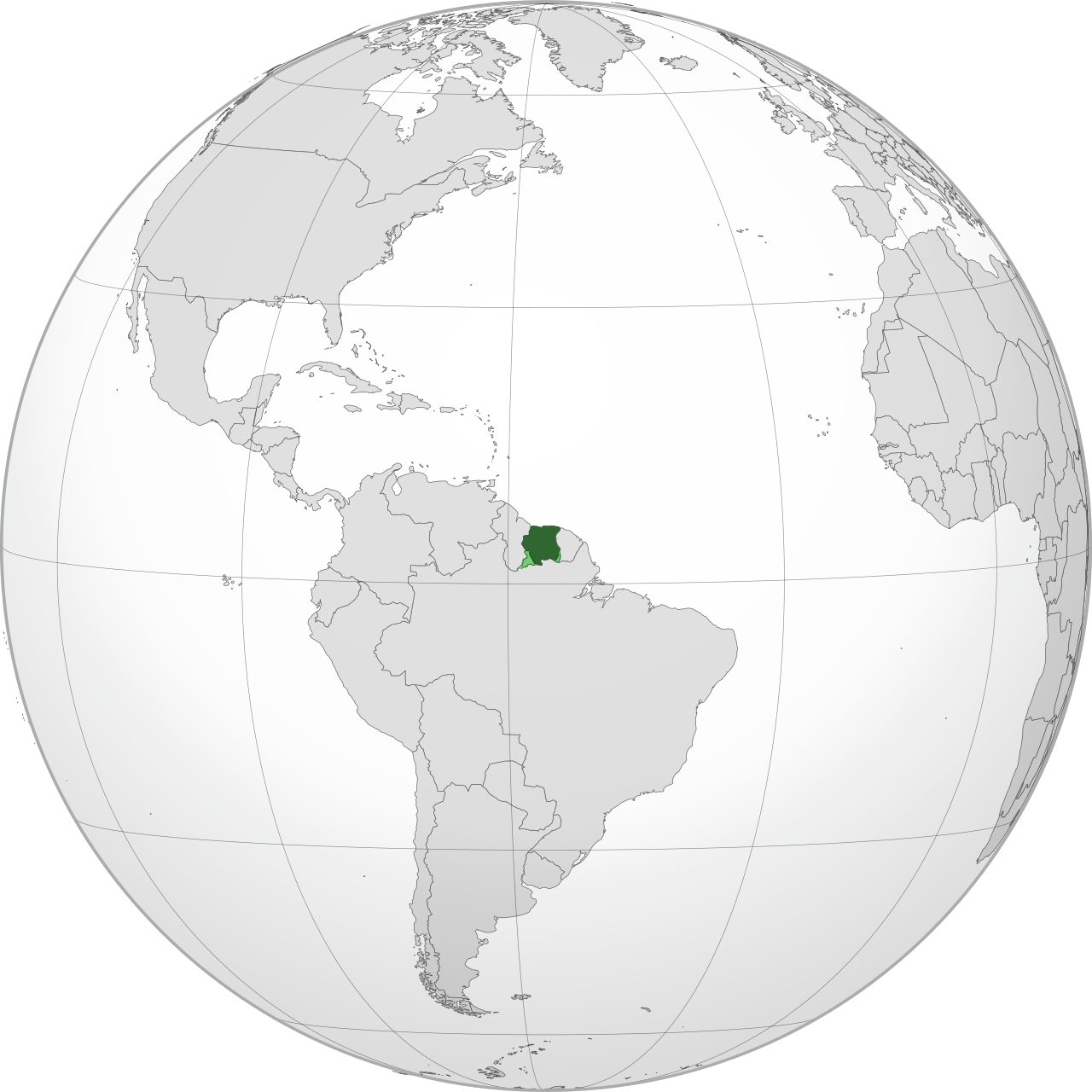
- Country: Suriname
- Continent: South America
- Country code: +597
- International access: 00
- Long-distance: 0

Telephone numbers in Suriname are administered by the government of the Republic of Suriname. Since 2017 the responsibility is at the ministry of Public Works, Transport and Communication and in the period of 1991 to 2017 of the Ministry of Transport, Communication and Tourism (TCT).

The international dialling code is +597. Suriname uses a number plan as hereunder described, since 2017 (maybe also earlier).

== Telephone numbering plan ==
Suriname uses the following National Significant Numbers (NSN):

- Minimum number length (excluding the country code): six digits.
- Maximum number length (excluding the country code): seven digits.

For more information, see below for Allocations.

The international dialling format is as follows:

- Mobile: +597 XXX XXXX
- Fixed: +597 XXX XXX

== History ==
Until 1969, a system was used with 2-digit area codes and local numbers varying from 2 to 5 digits depending on the area. Around 1969/1970 this was changed to a closed numbering system with 5-digit numbers nationwide; a zero had to be dialled before the number. At that time, some areas were not automated yet.

== Allocations ==
NDC (National Destination Code) or leading digits of NSN (National Significant Number)	NSN number length		Usage of E.164 Number	Additional information
NDC (National Destination Code) or leading digits of NSN (National Significant Number)	Maximum length	Minimum length	Usage of E.164 Number	Additional information
1XX	4	3	Non-geographic	Abbreviated numbers
21 XXXX	6	6	Geographic number – West Suriname	Fixed telephony services – Telesur
22 XXXX	6	6	Geographic number – West Suriname	Fixed telephony services – Telesur
23 XXXX	6	6	Geographic number – West Suriname	Fixed telephony services – Telesur
30 XXXX	6	6	Geographic number – Mid and East Suriname	Fixed telephony services – Telesur
31 XXXX	6	6	Geographic number – Mid and East Suriname	Fixed telephony services – Telesur
32 XXXX	6	6	Geographic number – Mid and East Suriname	Fixed telephony services – Telesur
33 XXXX	6	6	Geographic number – Mid and East Suriname	Fixed telephony services – Telesur
34 XXXX	6	6	Geographic number – Mid and East Suriname	Fixed telephony services – Telesur
35 XXXX	6	6	Geographic number – Mid and East Suriname	Fixed telephony services – Telesur
36 XXXX	6	6	Geographic number – Mid and East Suriname	Fixed telephony services – Telesur
37 XXXX	6	6	Geographic number – Mid and East Suriname	Fixed telephony services – Telesur
4 XXXXX	6	6	Geographic number – Paramaribo	Fixed telephony services – Telesur
52 XXXX	6	6	Geographic number – Paramaribo	Fixed telephony services – Telesur
53 XXXX	6	6	Geographic number – Paramaribo	Fixed telephony services – Telesur
54 XXXX	6	6	Geographic number – Paramaribo	Fixed telephony services – Telesur
55 XXXX	6	6	Geographic number – Paramaribo	Fixed telephony services – Telesur
56 XXXX	6	6	Non-geographic number	VoIP – Telesur
58 XXXX	6	6	Geographic number	Paramaribo Fixed telephony services – Telesur
68 XXXXX	7	7	Non-geographic number	WLL – Telesur; CDMA (Fixed version)
71 XXXXX	7	7	Non-geographic number	Mobile (GSM) telephony services – Digicel Suriname N.V.
72 XXXXX	7	7	Non-geographic number	Mobile (GSM) telephony services – reserved
75 XXXXX	7	7	Non-geographic number	Mobile (GSM) telephony services – Telesur
81 XXXXX	7	7	Non-geographic number	Mobile (GSM) telephony services – Digicel Suriname N.V.
82 XXXXX	7	7	Non-geographic number	Mobile (GSM) telephony services – Digicel Suriname N.V.
83 XXXXX	7	7	Non-geographic number	Mobile (GSM) telephony services – Intelsur (Uniqa)
84 XXXXX	7	7	Non-geographic number	Mobile (GSM) telephony services – Intelsur (Uniqa)
85 XXXXX	7	7	Non-geographic number	Mobile (GSM) telephony services – Telesur
86 XXXXX	7	7	Non-geographic number	Mobile (GSM) telephony services – Telesur
87 XXXXX	7	7	Non-geographic number	Mobile (GSM) telephony services – Telesur
88 XXXXX	7	7	Non-geographic number	Mobile (GSM) telephony services – Telesur
89 XXXXX	7	7	Non-geographic number	Mobile (GSM) telephony services – Telesur
