= Telephone numbers in the Comoros =

The following are the telephone codes in the Comoros.

Country code: +269
International call prefix: 00
Trunk prefix: none

== Calling formats ==
To call in the Comoros, the following format is used:

- yyy xxxx - Calls inside the Comoros
- +269 yyy xxxx - Calls from outside the Comoros

The NSN length is seven digits.

== List of telephone prefixes in the Comoros ==
The two tables below show the geographical and non-geographical telephone prefixes in the Comoros as announced by the Comorian regulatory body, Autorité Nationale de Régulation des Technologies de l'Information et de la Communication (ANRTIC), on the International Telecommunication Union (ITU) website:

List of Geographical Codes
Area Code	Area/City
760	Domoni
761	Mutsamudu
762	Mohéli
763	Moroni
767	Mbéni
768	Mitsamiouli
769	Foumbouni
770	Domoni
771	Mutsamudu
772	Mohéli
773	Moroni
774	Moroni
775	Moroni
777	Mbéni
778	Mitsamiouli
779	Foumbouni

List of Non-Geographical Codes
Code	Usage
32	Mobile telephony services
33	Mobile telephony services
34	Mobile telephony services
