= Telephone numbers in Solomon Islands =

This is a list of telephone codes for Solomon Islands.

Country Code: +677
International Call Prefix: 00 or 01

National Significant Numbers (NSN):

five-digits (fixed)
seven-digits (mobile)

== Area codes in Solomon Islands ==
List of area codes
Number range		Number of digits	Use of number
From	To	Number of digits	Use of number
00000	04799	Five	Spare for national use
04800	04899	Five	Spare for national use
04900	04999	Five	Spare for national use
05000	05999	Five	Spare for national use
06000	07999	Five	Spare for national use
08000	09999	Five	Spare for national use
10000	10999	Five	Spare for national use
11000	11999	Five	Spare for national use
12000	12999	Five	Spare for national use
13000	13999	Five	Free-Call Services
14000	14999	Five	Honiara fixed
15000	15999	Five	Honiara fixed
16000	16999	Five	Honiara fixed
17000	17999	Five	Honiara fixed
18000	18999	Five	Toll-Free Services
19000	19999	Five	Honiara fixed
20000	20999	Five	Honiara fixed
21000	21999	Five	Honiara fixed
22000	22999	Five	Honiara fixed
23000	23999	Five	Honiara fixed
24000	24999	Five	Honiara fixed
25000	25999	Five	Honiara fixed
26000	26999	Five	Honiara fixed
27000	27999	Five	Honiara fixed
28000	28999	Five	Honiara fixed
29000	29999	Five	Honiara fixed
30000	30999	Five	KGVI fixed
31000	31999	Five	KGVI fixed
32000	32699	Five	Tulagi fixed
32700	32799	Five	Reserved
32800	32899	Five	Reserved
32900	32999	Five	Reserved
33000	33999	Five	KGVI fixed
34000	34499	Five	Henderson fixed
34500	34699	Five	Tetere (Henderson Exchange) Fixed
34700	34999	Five	Gold Ridge fixed
35000	35559	Five	Buala fixed
35600	35999	Five	Spare for national use – fixed services
36000	36999	Five	Henderson fixed
37000	37599	Five	Henderson fixed
37600	37999	Five	Henderson fixed
38000	38999	Five	KGVI fixed
39000	39999	Five	KGVI fixed
40000	40999	Five	Auki fixed
41000	41099	Five	Auki fixed
41100	41199	Five	Atoifi fixed
41200	41299	Five	Yandina fixed
41300	41399	Five	Malu'u fixed
41400	41499	Five	Kia fixed
41500	41599	Five	Radefasu fixed
41600	41699	Five	Kilusakwalo fixed
41700	41799	Five	Maoro fixed
41800	41899	Five	West Are Are fixed
41900	41999	Five	Onepusu fixed
48000	48999	Five	Postpaid service
50000	50999	Five	Kira Kira fixed
51000	51299	Five	Spare for IP fixed service
51300	51399	Five	Malu'u IP fixed service
51400	51999	Five	Spare for IP fixed service
53000	53999	Five	Lata fixed
60000	60999	Five	Gizo fixed
61000	61999	Five	Noro fixed
62000	62099	Five	Reserved
62100	62999	Five	Munda fixed
63000	63099	Five	Spare for national use – fixed services
63100	63599	Five	Taro fixed
63600	63699	Five	Spare for national use – fixed services
67300	67399	Five	Sasamunga
67500	67599	Five	Shortland
67600	67649	Five	Poitete fixed
67650	67699	Five	Ringgi fixed
7400000	7401999	Seven	Hon/Provinces prepaid mobile service
7402000	7405999	Seven	Hon/Provinces prepaid mobile service, 5 October 2009
7406000	7408999	Seven	Hon/Provinces prepaid mobile service, 5 November 2009
7409000	7409999	Seven	Western Region prepaid mobile service, 5 November 2009
7410000	7415999	Seven	Hon/Provinces prepaid mobile service
7416000	7416999	Seven	GSM prepaid service
7417000	7419999	Seven	GSM prepaid service
7420000	7429999	Seven	GSM mobile
7430000	7439999	Seven	GSM Prepaid
74 40000	74 41999	Seven	GSM prepaid service
74 42000	74 42999	Seven	Honiara prepaid mobile
74 43000	74 43999	Seven	Fixed GSM Public Phone Services
74 44000	74 44999	Seven	Honiara prepaid mobile
74 45000	74 45999	Seven	Honiara prepaid mobile
74 46000	74 46999	Seven	Honiara prepaid mobile
74 47000	74 47499	Seven	Noro prepaid mobile
74 47500	74 47999	Seven	Auki prepaid mobile
74 49000	74 49999	Seven	Honiara prepaid mobile
74.52000	74.52379	Seven	Malu'u prepaid mobile
7452380	7452399	Seven	Malu'u postpaid mobile
7452400	7452999	Seven	Spare for Mobile Services
74 54000	74 54300	Seven	Lata prepaid mobile
74 54301	74 54321	Seven	Lata postpaid mobile
74 54322	74 54490	Seven	Kirakira prepaid mobile
74 54491	74 54500	Seven	Kirakira postpaid mobile
74 54501	74 54600	Seven	Tingoa Mobile
74 54601	74 54700	Seven	Afio mobile
74 54701	74 54800	Seven	Afio Mobile
74 54801	74 54819	Seven	Buala postpaid mobile
74 54820	74 54900	Seven	Buala prepaid mobile
74 54901	74 54999	Seven	Kia Mobile
74 55000	74 55299	Seven	Lata prepaid mobile
74 55300	74 55999	Seven	Kirakira prepaid mobile
74 56000	74 56999	Seven	Honiara prepaid mobile
7457000	7457499	Seven	Buala prepaid mobile
7457500	7457999	Seven	Taro prepaid mobile
7458000	7458999	Seven	Honiara prepaid mobile
7459000	7459999	Seven	Honiara prepaid mobile
74 64000	74 64399	Seven	Kirakira prepaid mobile
74 64400	74 64599	Seven	Kia prepaid mobile
74 64600	74 64799	Seven	Munda prepaid mobile
74 64800	74 64999	Seven	Noro prepaid mobile
74 65000	74 65299	Seven	Reserved
74 65300	74 65499	Seven	Gizo postpaid mobile
74 65500	74 65519	Seven	Taro postpaid mobile
74 65521	74 65600	Seven	Taro prepaid mobile
74 65601	74 65999	Seven	Gizo prepaid mobile
74 66000	74 66999	Seven	Gizo prepaid mobile
74 67000	74 67099	Seven	Seghe prepaid mobile
74 67100	74 67199	Seven	Seghe prepaid mobile
74 67200	74 67299	Seven	Seghe prepaid mobile
74 67400	74 67499	Seven	Afio prepaid mobile
74 67700	74 67799	Seven	Gizo prepaid mobile
74 67800	74 67899	Seven	Gizo prepaid mobile
74 67900	74 67999	Seven	Gizo prepaid mobile
74 68000	74 68999	Seven	Honiara prepaid mobile
74 69000	74 69999	Seven	Honiara prepaid mobile
74 70000	74 70099	Seven	Mobile (Noro Post Paid)
74 70100	74 70999	Seven	Mobile (Noro Prepaid)
74 71000	74 71099	Seven	Mobile (Munda Post Paid)
74 71100	74 71699	Seven	Mobile (Munda Prepaid)
74 71700	74 71990	Seven	Mobile (Ringgi Prepaid)
74 71991	74 71999	Seven	Mobile (Ringgi Postpaid)
74 72000	74 72999	Seven	Mobile (Honiara Prepaid)
74 73000	74 73999	Seven	Mobile (Honiara Prepaid)
74 74000	74 74999	Seven	Voice Mail Service
74 75000	74 75999	Seven	Mobile (Honiara Prepaid)
74 76000	74 76999	Seven	Mobile (Honiara Prepaid)
74 77000	74 77999	Seven	Mobile (Honiara Prepaid)
74 78000	74 78999	Seven	Mobile (Honiara Prepaid)
74 79000	74 79999	Seven	Mobile (Honiara Prepaid)
74 80000	74 80199	Seven	Reserved
74 80200	74 80399	Seven	Mobile (Auki Postpaid)
74 80400	74 80999	Seven	Mobile (Auki Prepaid)
74 81000	74 81399	Seven	Mobile (Auki Prepaid)
74 81400	74 81999	Seven	Mobile (Auki Prepaid)
74 82000	74 82999	Seven	Mobile (Honiara Prepaid)
74 83000	74 83049	Seven	Mobile (Honiara Prepaid)
74 83050	74 83499	Seven	Mobile (Honiara Prepaid)
74 83500	74 83549	Seven	Mobile (Honiara Prepaid)
74 83550	74 83999	Seven	Mobile (Honiara Prepaid)
74 84000	74 84049	Seven	Mobile (Tulagi PostPaid)
74 84050	74 84499	Seven	Mobile (Tulagi Prepaid)
74 84500	74 84549	Seven	Mobile (Honiara Prepaid)
74 84550	74 84999	Seven	Mobile (Honiara Prepaid)
74 85000	74 85049	Seven	Mobile (Honiara Prepaid)
74 85050	74 85499	Seven	Mobile (Honiara Prepaid)
74 85500	74 85549	Seven	Mobile (Honiara Prepaid)
74 85550	74 85999	Seven	Mobile (Honiara Prepaid)
74 86000	74 86999	Seven	Mobile (Honiara Prepaid)
74 87000	74 87099	Seven	Mobile Honiara Prepaid
74 87100	74 87499	Seven	Mobile Honiara Prepaid
74 87500	74 87599	Seven	Mobile Honiara Prepaid
74 87600	74 87999	Seven	Mobile Honiara Prepaid
74 88000	74 88999	Seven	Mobile (Honiara Prepaid)
74 89000	74 89999	Seven	Mobile (Honiara Prepaid)
74 90000	74 90999	Seven	Temporary Internet service
74 91000	74 91999	Seven	Mobile (Honiara Prepaid)
74 92000	74 92999	Seven	Mobile (Honiara Prepaid)
74 93000	74 93999	Seven	Mobile (Honiara Prepaid)
74 94000	74 94999	Seven	Mobile (Honiara Postpaid)
74 95000	74 95999	Seven	Mobile (Honiara Postpaid)
74 96000	74 96999	Seven	Mobile (Honiara Postpaid)
74 97000	74 97999	Seven	Mobile (Honiara Prepaid)
74 98000	74 98999	Seven	Mobile (Honiara Prepaid)
74 99000	74 99899	Seven	Mobile (Honiara Prepaid)
74 99900	74 99999	Seven	Reserved for national services
75 00000	75 09999	Seven	GSM prepaid service
75 20000	75 29999	Seven	GSM prepaid service
75 50000	75 59999	Seven	GSM prepaid service
75 60000	75 69999	Seven	GSM prepaid service
75 70000	75 79999	Seven	GSM
75 80000	75 89999	Seven	GSM prepaid service

== Special numbers ==
Short codes	Services provided to public
100	Top 100 Customer Service
102	(SOLAIR)
103	Fault Management Test Desk
104	Faults Reporting
105	BSP EFTPOS
106	Prepaid System Access
107	E-TOP UP (More Magic)
109	National Directory Enquiries
111	International Dialling Assistance (C11)
112	International Dialling Assistance (C12)
120	Inbound Home Direct
121	Breeze GSM Prepaid Balance Enquiry
122	Breeze GSM Recharge
126	Breeze Voice Mail Access
141	Prepaid Dial Up Internet Access
148	Dial Up Internet Access
149	Postpaid Dial Up Internet Access
168	Postpaid Access System (voice)
901	National Directory Assistance

Emergency services	Free service to public
911	National Referral Hospital "Mercy Net”
922	Fire Service Henderson Airport
933	Meteorological Service
955	National Disaster Council
977	Marine Search and Rescue
999	Police & Fire Emergency

== See also ==
- Telecommunications in Solomon Islands
