= Telephone numbers in the Pitcairn Islands =

Country code: +64 (partial)
International call prefix: 00

Telephone numbers in Pitcairn Island use ranges owned by New Zealand.

Format: +64 XXXXXXXX

| Number range | Usage |
|---|---|
| +64 | Pitcairn Island |

Pitcairn has had a dedicated satellite connection since 2002, which was extended in 2007 to provide phone and internet service to all households. 4G LTE mobile service has been available since 2018.

Due to privacy concerns with such a small group of subscribers, the numbers allocated to them are not made public, except to note that they appear to be ordinary New Zealand numbers (+64). Calls to these lines are routed via an exchange in Auckland, New Zealand.

Until 2006, the only telephones on Pitcairn were a few Inmarsat Mini M satellite terminals, including a public payphone, a control room phone, and a fax device. (These have been retained in case the main phone service fails or is unavailable.) All Inmarsat services use non-geographic country code +870.

| Control room telephone | +870 762337765 |
| Public telephone | +870 762337766 |
| Fax | +870 762337767 |

Except for these terminals, phone service is provided by Pitcairn Telecom.
