= Telephone numbers in New Caledonia =

- Country: New Caledonia
- Continent: Oceania
- NSN length: 6
- Country code: +687
- International access: 00

Telephone numbers in New Caledonia use the country calling code +687 and generally have six-digit national significant numbers; the international call prefix is 00. Fixed-line public switched telephone network numbers use several ranges beginning with 2, 3, and 4, while mobile GSM services use ranges beginning with 7, 8, and 9. The numbering plan also assigns specific ranges to services including Internet and voice services, Marine VHF, public payphones, emergency services, and other local-use and operator services.

== Numbering in New Caledonia ==
Most national significant numbers (NSNs) in New Caledonia are six digits long.

LIST OF INITIAL DIGITS
Initial digits	Min	Max	Notes
0			Vacant
15, 16, 17, 18	2	2	Emergency services – local use only
1000, 1006, 1010, 1012, 1013, 1014, 1016, 1020, 1030, 1031, 1032, 1035, 1042, 1050, 1055, 1058, 1077	4	4	OPT services – local use only
20, 23, 24, 25, 26, 27, 28, 29	6	6	PSTN fixed network
30, 31, 32, 33, 34, 35	6	6	PSTN fixed network
36	6	6	Audiotel; Internet; voice services
41, 42, 43, 44, 45, 46, 47	6	6	PSTN fixed network
55	8	8	Local use only
56, 57, 58	3	3	Local use only
66	6	6	Marine VHF
70	6	6	GSM LIBERTE de MOBILIS (prepaid)
73, 74, 75, 76, 77, 78, 79	6	6	GSM MOBILIS (post-paid)
80, 81, 82, 83, 84, 85, 86, 87	6	6	GSM LIBERTE de MOBILIS (prepaid)
88	6	6	Public payphones
89, 90, 91, 92, 93, 94, 95, 96, 97, 98, 99	6	6	GSM LIBERTE de MOBILIS (prepaid)
C11	1	1	Operator
C12	1	1	Operator

== See also ==
- Telecommunications in New Caledonia
