= International premium rate service =

Tolled telephone service

International premium rate service (IPRS) refers to internationally available telephone-based premium services. It is analogous to "900" or "976" numbers in North America, which always incur a recipient-defined charge in excess of regular call charges. Internationally, this service has been allocated country code +979. IPRS numbers are known as UIPRNs.

The ITU recommendation for IPRS defines four charge categories, across which the +979 numbering space is divided:

Range	Charge band	Designation
+979 1	1	"High"
+979 3	2	"Medium"
+979 5	3	"Low"
+979 9	Special	"Special"

UIPRNs are only available to premium service providers who will provide their service to more than one country.

The format of the numbers will be 979 a bcdefghi, where the a digit, 1, 3, 5 or 9, will indicate the charging band, and the remaining digits will be the IPRS subscriber's number. 1, 3 and 5 indicate charge bands 1, 2 and 3, respectively, while 9 will indicate a special charge band.

The service is not yet known to be active. Once it is activated, it may not be available from every country, even though there is minimal or no cost to the receiving customer, as interchange rates would need to be negotiated for countries to allow origination of calls.

== Usage ==
IPRS phone numbers are used by the German malware manufacturer FinFisher for their Android Trojans.
