= International Telecommunications Public Correspondence Service =

Proposal within the international numbering plan

International Telecommunications Public Correspondence Service (ITPCS) was an International Telecommunication Union (ITU) proposal for some form of individual-based international numbering plan that would be accessed using telephone numbers from the 991 range.

The international dialling code 991 001 was assigned by ITU to Neustar for use in a trial from 2001 to 2004 and thereafter from 2019 until 2021.

== See also ==
- List of country calling codes
