= Telephone numbers in Guatemala =

Telephone numbers in Guatemala are regulated by Superintendencia de Telecomunicaciones, the regulatory authority for telecommunications in Guatemala.

Country Code: +502
International Call Prefix: 00

In Guatemala, regular phone numbers are 8 digits. The first digit indicates the type of phone:
2: Guatemala City (Geographic Number)
3: Mobile (non geographic)
4: Mobile (non geographic)
5: Mobile (non geographic)
6: Guatemala City (Geographic Number)
7: Rural Guatemala / Rest of country (Geographic Number)

Within each area, there are different service providers. The following 3 digits indicate the service provider. However, their assignment is on a first-come, first-served basis. Additionally, the same service provider has different numbers in each of the 5 telephone types, and those numbers are not contiguous. The assignment tables can be found at Superintendencia de Telecomunicaciones

Each provider may charge an extra connection fee when making calls between different providers.

Additionally there are other special numbers:

3-digit numbers: emergency systems
120 and 110: police
122 and 123: firefighters
128 IGSS (social security ambulance)
These numbers are not billed

4-digit numbers:
These can be public information services or phone numbers leased to private companies. (usually big ones, such as banks and fast food restaurant delivery services.) They are billed at different rates.

6-digit numbers:
Telephone carriers numbers: for making operator, or collect calls, or getting service from some company. Billed at different rates.

1-800: Toll-free calls redirected to out-of-country offices

1-801: Local toll-free calls

== See also ==
- Telecommunications in Guatemala
