= Telephone numbers in the Democratic Republic of the Congo =

Telephone numbers in the Democratic Republic of the Congo use the country calling code +243, with 00 as the international call prefix and 0 as the domestic trunk prefix. Calls within the same area code use a seven-digit local number, while domestic calls between areas use 0 followed by the one-digit area code and local number. Calls from abroad use +243 followed by the area code and local number; calls from abroad to mobile numbers use the format +243 82 xxx xx xx. Geographic area codes run from 1 to 6, with 1 assigned to Kinshasa and the remaining codes assigned to groups of regions elsewhere in the country.

== Dialing codes and prefixes ==
Country Code: +243
International Call Prefix: 00
Trunk Prefix: 0

== Calling formats ==
To call in the Democratic Republic of the Congo, the following format is used:

- xxx xx xx - Calls within an area code
- 0y xxx xx xx - Calls within the Democratic Republic of the Congo
- +243 y xxx xx xx - Calls from outside the Democratic Republic of the Congo
- +243 82 xxx xx xx - Call from outside the Democratic Republic of the Congo toward mobiles

== List of area codes in the Democratic Republic of the Congo ==
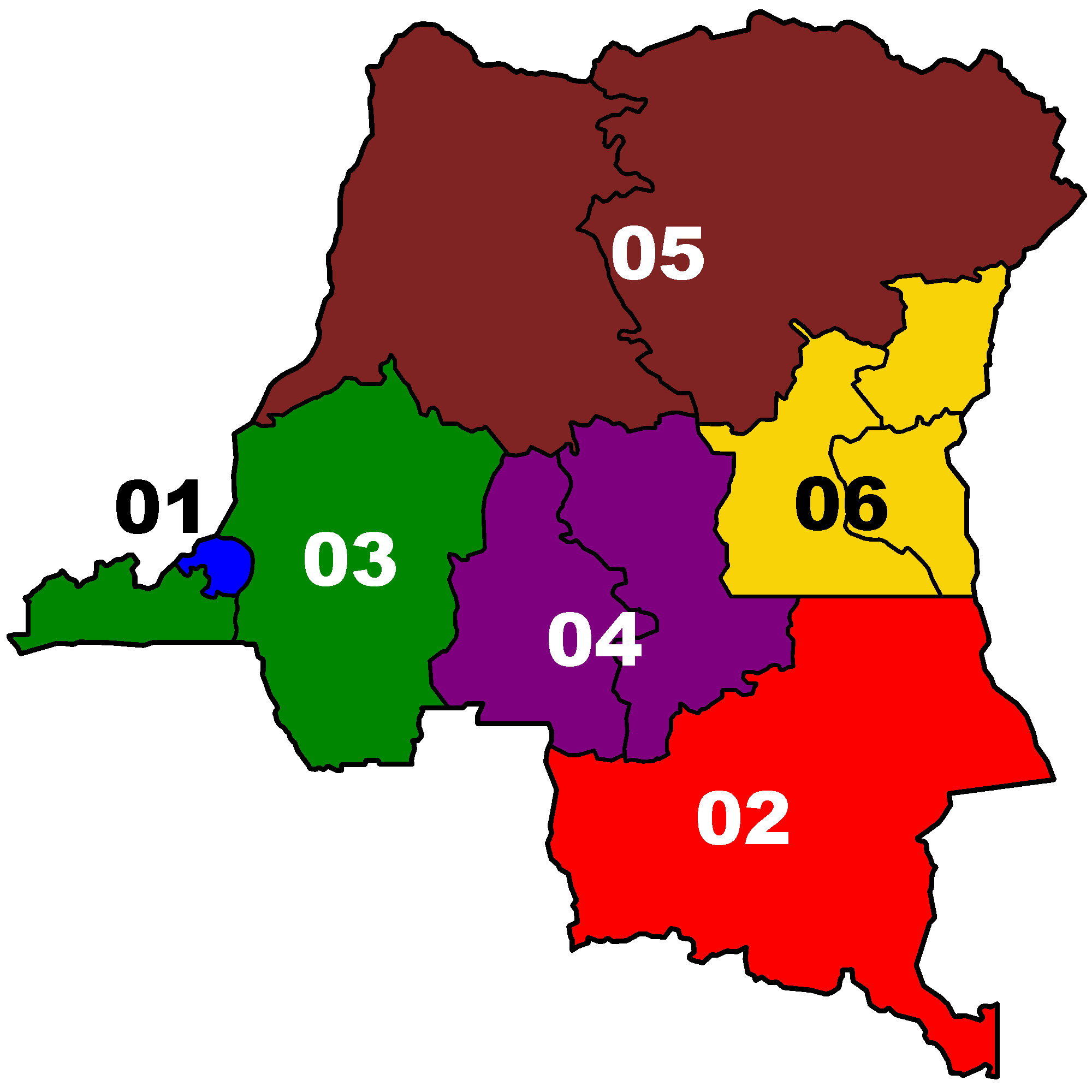

LIST OF AREA CODES
Area/City	Area Code
Kinshasa	1
Katanga	2
Bas-Congo, Bandundu	3
Kasai-Oriental, Kasai-Occidental	4
Province Orientale	5
Nord-Kivu, Sud-Kivu, Maniema	6
