= Telephone numbers in Tonga =

- Country: Tonga
- Continent: Oceania
- Format: +676 yy xxx
- Country code: +676
- International access: 00

Country Code: +676
International Call Prefix: 00

yy xxx Calls inside Tonga

+676 yy xxx Calls from outside Tonga

== List of area codes in Tonga ==
LIST OF AREA CODES
Area Code	Area
20	Nukuʻalofa
21	Nukuʻalofa
22	Nukuʻalofa
23	Nukuʻalofa
24	Nukuʻalofa
25	Nukuʻalofa
26	Nukuʻalofa
27	Nukuʻalofa
28	Nukuʻalofa
29	Pea
31	Mua
32	Mua
33	Kolonga
34	Kolonga
35	Nakulo
36	Nakulo
37	Vaini
38	Vaini
41	Masilanea
42	Masilanea
43	Matangiake
44	Matangiake
50	Ena
60	Haʻapai
70	Neiafu
71	Neiafu
74	Neiafu
79	Neiafu
80	Niuafoʻou
85	Niuatoputapu

List of Mobile Area Codes
Area Code	Area
87	Tongatapu Island Group
88	Vavaʻu Island Group
89	Haʻapai Island Group

Additionally, mobile phones provided by U-Call Mobile are prefixed by the two-digit code of either 15, 16, 17, 18 or 19.

== See also ==
- Telecommunications in Tonga
