= Telephone numbers in the Falkland Islands =

Telephone numbers in the Falkland Islands use the country calling code +500 and the international call prefix 00. Ordinary national significant numbers have five digits, although shorter numbers are used for some services. Public switched telephone network (PSTN) numbers are allocated in ranges beginning with 2, 3, 4, and 7, while GSM mobile numbers use ranges beginning with 5 and 6. Ranges beginning with 8 and most of those beginning with 9 are spare, while 999 is used for emergency services.

== Numbering ==
Country Code: +500
International Call Prefix: 00

National Significant Numbers (NSN): five digits.

Format: +500 YYXXX

== Allocations ==
LIST OF ALLOCATIONS
Format of subscriber number	Remarks
1XX – 19X	PSTN Service Numbers
20XXX – 29XXX	PSTN
30XXX – 39XXX	PSTN
40XXX – 49XXX	PSTN
50XXX – 59XXX	Mobile, GSM
60XXX – 69XXX	Mobile, GSM
70XXX – 79XXX	PSTN
80XXX – 89XXX	Spare
90XXX – 98XXX	Spare
99XXX – 999XX	PSTN Emergency Services (999)

== See also ==
- Telephone numbers in the United Kingdom
