= Telephone numbers in Seychelles =

The following are the telephone codes in Seychelles.

Country Code: +248
International Call Prefix: 00
Trunk Prefix: none

== Calling formats ==
- XXX XXXX - calling within the Seychelles
- +248 XXX XXXX - from outside the Seychelles

The NSN length is seven digits.

== List of allocations in Seychelles ==
=== New number plan took effect May 2011 ===
GENERAL LIST OF ALLOCATIONS
Operator	Service	Old Number	New Number
CWS	Fixed	2X XX XX	4 2X XX XX
CWS	Fixed	3X XX XX	4 3X XX XX
AIRTEL	Fixed	6X XX XX	4 6X XX XX
CWS	Mobile	5X XX XX	2 5X XX XX
AIRTEL	Mobile	7X XX XX	2 7X XX XX

=== Detailed listings ===
LIST OF ALLOCATIONS
Leading Digits	Digit Length	Type of Services	Status
2(0-4)	7	Mobile Services	Unallocated
25(0-4)	7	Mobile Services	CWS
255(0-5)	7	Fixed Cellular	CWS
255(6-9)	7	Mobile Services	CWS
25(6-9)	7	Mobile Services	CWS
26(0-9)	7	Mobile Services	Unallocated
27(0-7)	7	Mobile Services	AIRTEL
278(0-1)	7	Fixed Cellular	AIRTEL
2782	7	Mobile Services	AIRTEL
2783	7	Fixed Cellular	AIRTEL
278(4-9)	7	Mobile Services	AIRTEL
279(0-9)	7	Mobile Services	AIRTEL
2(8-9)	7	Mobile Services	Unallocated
3(0-9)		Reserved	Unallocated
4(0-1)	7	Fixed Services	Unallocated
420(0-4)	7	Audio Text	CWS
4205	7	Fixed Services	CWS
420(6-7)	7	Audio Text	CWS
420(8-9)	7	Fixed Services	CWS
4210	7	Fixed Services	CWS
421(1-2)	7	Audio Text	CWS
421(3-9)	7	Fixed Services	CWS
42(2-9)	7	Fixed Services	CWS (4229: Outer Islands)
43(0-9)	7	Fixed Services	CWS
44(0-9)	7	Fixed Services	INTELVISION
45(0-9)	7	Fixed Services	Unallocated
46(0-9)	7	Fixed Services	AIRTEL
4(7-9)	7	Fixed Services	Unallocated
5(0-9)		Reserved	Unallocated
6(0-3)	7	Fixed VoIP	Unallocated
64(0-9)	7	Fixed VoIP	KOKONET
6(5-9)	7	Fixed VoIP	Unallocated
7(0-9)		Reserved	Unallocated
800(000-099)	6	Freephone Services	AIRTEL
800(100-999)	6	Freephone Services	Unallocated
80(1-9)		Reserved	Unallocated
8(1-9)		Reserved	Unallocated
9(0-5)		Reserved	Unallocated
96(0-9)	4	Short Codes for VAS Services	SMS/MMS
970		Reserved	Unallocated
971	6	Audio Text Services	CWS
97(2-9)		Reserved	Unallocated
98(0-9)	6	VAS/SMS	MEDIATECH
99(0-8)		Reserved	Unallocated
999	3	Emergency Services	ALL
