= Telephone numbers in El Salvador =

- Country Code: +503
- International Call Prefix: 00

National Significant Numbers (NSN): seven or eight digits.

Format: +503 NXYZ MCDU where 'N' is the National Destination Code (NDC), and 'X', 'Y', 'Z', 'M', 'C', 'D', and 'U' stand for millions, hundred thousands, ten thousands, thousands, hundreds, tens, and units, respectively.

== Number plan ==
New number plan took effect in 2005.

The numbering plan for the Republic of El Salvador uses the following numbering structure:

for services provided via eight (8) digit access networks including the NDC,
freephone numbers and premium rate numbers use seven (7) and eight (8) digits.

NDC
National Destination Code (NDC)	Type of network
2	Fixed
6, 7	Mobile

Digit X	Use within the structure (2) XYZ–MCDU
0	Not used in this structure – reserved for future use.
1	For future use in the Metropolitan area.
2 and 5	Used for identifying the fixed telephony service in any locality within the Metropolitan area known as “San Salvador”.
3	Used for identifying the fixed telephony service in any locality within the Central area.
4	Used for identifying the fixed telephony service in any locality within the Western area.
6	Used for identifying the fixed telephony service in any locality within the Eastern area.
7	For future use in the Eastern area.
8	For future use in the Western area.
9	For future use in the Central area.

LIST OF ALLOCATIONS
NSN (National (Significant) Number)		Usage of E.164 number
Old number	New number	Usage of E.164 number
–	20XX XXXX	Future use
–	21XX XXXX	Fixed telephony geographic number – metropolitan area
2XX XXXX	22XX XXXX	Fixed telephony geographic number – metropolitan area
3XX XXXX	23XX XXXX	Fixed telephony geographic number – central area
4XX XXXX	24XX XXXX	Fixed telephony geographic number – western area
5XX XXXX	25XX XXXX	Fixed telephony geographic number – metropolitan area
6XX XXXX	26XX XXXX	Fixed telephony geographic number – eastern area
–	27XX XXXX	Fixed telephony geographic number – eastern area
–	28XX XXXX	Fixed telephony geographic number – western area
–	29XX XXXX	Fixed telephony geographic number – central area
–	60XX XXXX	Non-geographic number - Mobile telephony services
–	61XX XXXX	Non-geographic number - Mobile telephony services
–	62XX XXXX	Non-geographic number - Mobile telephony services
–	63XX XXXX	Non-geographic number - Mobile telephony services
–	64XX XXXX	Non-geographic number - Mobile telephony services
–	65XX XXXX	Non-geographic number - Mobile telephony services
–	66XX XXXX	Non-geographic number - Mobile telephony services
–	67XX XXXX	Non-geographic number - Mobile telephony services
–	68XX XXXX	Non-geographic number - Mobile telephony services
–	69XX XXXX	Non-geographic number - Mobile telephony services
–	70XX XXXX	Non-geographic number - Mobile telephony services
–	71XX XXXX	Non-geographic number - Mobile telephony services
–	72XX XXXX	Non-geographic number - Mobile telephony services
–	73XX XXXX	Non-geographic number - Mobile telephony services
–	74XX XXXX	Non-geographic number - Mobile telephony services
–	75XX XXXX	Non-geographic number - Mobile telephony services
–	76XX XXXX	Non-geographic number - Mobile telephony services
7XX XXXX	77XX XXXX	Non-geographic number - Mobile telephony services
8XX XXXX	78XX XXXX	Non-geographic number - Mobile telephony services
9XX XXXX	79XX XXXX	Non-geographic number - Mobile telephony services

Notes

- The numbering for the freephone service for the user making the call retains its 7 and 11 digit form, with the formats 800 XXXX and 800 XXXX XXXX.
- The numbering for the premium rate service for the user making the call retains its 7 and 11 digit form, with the formats 900 XXXX and 900 XXXX XXXX.

== See also ==
- Telecommunications in El Salvador
