= Telephone numbers in Equatorial Guinea =

Telephone numbers in Equatorial Guinea use the country calling code +240 and have nine-digit national significant numbers; the international call prefix is 00. The fixed-line numbering system is geographic, with number portability, and fixed-line numbers begin with 3. Mobile numbers are non-geographic and currently begin with 2 or 5, while prefixes beginning with 6 and 7 are reserved for future mobile services. The numbering plan also provides non-geographic ranges beginning with 8 and 9 for value-added and intelligent-network services, including freephone, shared-cost, premium-rate, and Internet-access services.

== Dialing codes and prefixes ==
Country Code: +240
International Call Prefix: 00
Trunk Prefix:

== Calling formats ==
To call in Equatorial Guinea, the following format is used:

- xx xxx xxxx - calls within Equatorial Guinea
- +240 yy xxx xxxx - calls from outside Equatorial Guinea

The NSN length is nine digits.

== Area codes ==
The structure of the numbering system of the public switched telephone network is geographic, with number portability, as follows:

DN + NDC + SN = NSN = NJ XPQ MCDU

DN (Network code) = NJ

NDC (Numbering area) = XPQ

SN (Subscriber number) = MCDU

For landlines, 3J XPQ MCDU where J cannot be 0.

'M', 'C', 'D', and 'U' stand for thousands, hundreds, tens, and units, respectively.

LIST OF FIXED ALLOCATIONS
Service (landline = 3)	Operator code (1 to 9)	Two digits (unspecified use)	Area code (one digit)	Subscriber number (four digits)	Area/Usage (place name or service)
3	1 to 9	XX	9	XXXX	Bioko Island
3	1 to 9	XX	8	XXXX	Litoral/Annobón
3	1 to 9	XX	7	XXXX	Centro-Sur/Kie-Ntem/Wele-Nzás
3	1 to 9	XX	6	XXXX	CDMA fixed
3	1 to 9	XX	5	XXXX	Centro-Sur/Kié-Ntem/Wele-Nzás (reserved)
3	1 to 9	XX	4	XXXX	CDMA fixed
3	1 to 9	XX	3	XXXX	Bioko Island (reserved)
3	1 to 9	XX	2	XXXX	Litoral/Annobón (reserved)
3	1 to 9	XX	1	XXXX	Bioko Island (reserved)

Numbers beginning 4 are reserved for future fixed services.

== Mobile numbers ==
The structure of the numbering system of the cellular mobile telephone network is non-geographic, as follows:

DN + SN = NSN = NJ XPQ MCDU

DN (Network code) = NDC = NJ

SN (Subscriber number) = XPQMCDU

Numbers beginning 2 or 5 are in use for mobile telephones.

Numbers beginning 6 and 7 are reserved for future mobile services.

== Value added services ==
For value-added services such as freephone numbers, shared cost numbers and personal numbers, numbers will comprise nine digits, with the following format:

80X PQMCDU, (P ≠ 0)

For valued-added services such as premium rate services for businesses, premium rate services that are leisure-related, and Internet access, numbers will comprise nine digits, with the following format:

90X PQMCDU (P ≠ 0)

Numbers for intelligent network services are non-geographic.

== Allocations by operator ==
=== Fixed ===
- Fixed service, 3J XPQMCDU

LIST OF FIXED ALLOCATIONS
Operator	Format	Area
GETESA	33 3P9 MCDU	Bioko
GETESA	33 3P8 MCDU	Litoral/Annobón
GETESA	33 3P7 MCDU	Centro-Sur/Kié-Ntem/Wele-Nzás
GETESA	33 XP4 MCDU	CDMA Bioko
GETESA	33 XP6 MCDU	CDMA Continental Region
HiTs G.E. S.A.	35 XP9 MCDU	Bioko
HiTs G.E. S.A.	35 XP8 MCDU	Litoral/Annobón
HiTs G.E. S.A.	35 XP7 MCDU	Centro-Sur/Kié-Ntem/Wele-Nzás

=== Mobile ===
- Mobile service, 2J XPQMCDU and 5J XPQMCDU

LIST OF MOBILE ALLOCATIONS
Operator	Format
GETESA	22 2PQMCDU
HiTs G.E. S.A.	55 1PQMCDU

== Previous fixed codes ==
LIST OF FIXED AREA CODES IN 2009
Area/City	Area Code
Bata (Continent)	8 XXXXX
Malabo (Bioko Island)	9 XXXXX
Malabo (Continent)	7 XXXXX
