= Telephone numbers in Niue =

An updated numbering plan for the island nation of Niue took effect from 1 May 2018. The country code for Niue is +683, preceded by the international call prefix 00.

== Allocations ==
List of allocations
Assignment	Country code	Telephone number	Status
Operator assistance	683	010	Active
Faults & directory service	683	015	Active
Weather & tidal information	683	101	Active
Emergency		999	Active
Reserved	683	1000 – 1099	Reserved
Post paid AMPS mobile	683	1100 – 1999	Not Active
Prepaid GSM fixed wireless	683	2000 – 2999	Not Active
Post paid AMPS FWT	683	3000 – 3999	Not Active
Post paid PSTN	683	4000 – 4999	Active
Prepaid GSM mobile 2G	683	5000 – 5999	Active
Prepaid GSM mobile 2G	683	6000 – 6999	Active
Postpaid PSTN	683	7000 – 9999	Active
Prepaid LTE mobile	683	8884000 – 8889999	Active

== See also ==
- Communications in Niue
