= Telephone numbers in the Marshall Islands =

Telephone numbers in the Marshall Islands use the country calling code +692 and the international call prefix 00. The numbering plan primarily uses seven-digit national significant numbers, although some allocations listed for outer atolls and voicemail services use six digits. Geographic number ranges are assigned to fixed-line and mobile services in areas including Majuro, Ebeye and Kwajalein Atoll, Jaluit, Wotje, Kili, and Rongelap. The plan also includes non-geographic ranges for V-SAT telephony and GSM voicemail services.

== Dialing codes and prefixes ==
Country Code: +692
International Call Prefix: 00

National Significant Numbers (NSN): seven-digits

Format: +692 yyy xxxx or +692 yyyy xxx

== Areas in the Marshall Islands ==
LIST OF AREA CODES
NDC (National Destination Code) or leading digits of NSN (National Significant Number)	NSN number length		Usage of E.164 Number	Additional information
NDC (National Destination Code) or leading digits of NSN (National Significant Number)	Maximum length	Minimum length	Usage of E.164 Number	Additional information
235	7	7	Geographic number – Digital GSM mobile telephony services	Existing Plan – Ebeye, Kwajalein Atoll
247	7	7	Geographic number – PSTN services	Existing Plan – Majuro Atoll Airport exchange
329	7	7	Geographic number – Digital GSM mobile telephony services	Existing Plan – Ebeye, Kwajalein Atoll
455	7	7	Geographic number – Digital GSM mobile telephony services	Existing Plan – Entire Majuro Atoll
456	7	7	Geographic number – Digital GSM mobile telephony services	New Plan – not yet in force. 455 XXX number range almost exhausted. 456 XXXX will be new number range. Majuro Atoll
528	7	7	Geographic number – PSTN services	Existing Plan – Majuro Atoll Laura Exchange
5451	6	6	Geographic number – Digital GSM mobile telephony services	Existing Plan – Jaluit Atoll
5452	6	6	Geographic number – Digital GSM mobile telephony services	Existing Plan – Wotje Atoll
5453	6	6	Geographic number – Digital GSM mobile telephony services	Existing Plan – Kili Atoll
5454	6	6	Geographic number – Digital GSM mobile telephony services	Existing Plan – Rongelap Atoll
625	7	7	Geographic number – PSTN services	Existing plan – NTA HQ CO Exchange
635	7	7	Non-Geographic number – V-SAT telephony services	New plan – In-service as from 10.VII.2009
9997	6	6	Non-geographic –GSM voice mail	Calling from overseas and PSTN network
9998	6	6	Non-geographic –GSM voice mail	Calling from MINTA GSM mobile network

== See also ==
- Communications in the Marshall Islands
