= Telephone numbers in Mauritius =

- Location of Mauritius
- Country: Mauritius
- Continent: Africa
- Regulator: Information and Communication Technologies Authority of Mauritius
- Numbering plan type: Closed
- NSN length: Landline: 7 Mobile: 8
- Format: Landline: xxx xxxx Mobile: 5 xxx xxxx
- Numbering plan: National Numbering Plan Mauritius
- Last updated: 23 March, 2018
- Country code: +230
- International access: 00
- Long-distance: n/a

Telephone numbers in Mauritius follow a closed numbering plan and are regulated by the Information and Communication Technologies Authority.

== Numbering details ==
Mauritian phone numbers are seven (landline) to eight digits (mobile) long. Landline numbers begin with 2 (north), 4 (central), or 6 (south). Mobile numbers begin with the digit 5 or 7.

== Calling formats ==
To call a Mauritius mobile phone, the following format is used:

- 5 123 4567 Calls inside Mauritius
- +230 5 123 4567 Calls from outside Mauritius

To call a Mauritius fixed line, the following format is used:

- 123 4567 Calls inside Mauritius
- +230 123 4567 Calls from outside Mauritius
