= Telephone numbers in Papua New Guinea =

- Country: Papua New Guinea
- Continent: Oceania
- Country code: +675
- International access: 00
- Long-distance: None

Telephone numbers in Papua New Guinea consist of mostly seven and some eight digit numbers (fixed), or eight digit numbers (mobile).

The international prefix for Papua New Guinea was changed from ‘05’ to ’00’ in 2010.

== Landline ==
List of area codes and allocations
Operator	Service/town	Subscriber number	Length of NSN
Telikom PNG Limited	National Capital District		
Telikom PNG Limited	Port Moresby	300 XXXX to 303 XXXX	Seven digits
Telikom PNG Limited	Port Moresby	306 XXXX	Seven digits
Telikom PNG Limited	Port Moresby	308 XXXX to 312 XXXX	Seven digits
Telikom PNG Limited	Port Moresby	320 XXXX to 328 XXXX	Seven digits
Telikom PNG Limited	Central Rural	329 XXXX	Seven digits
Telikom PNG Limited	Southern region		
Telikom PNG Limited	Oro	642 XXXX	Seven digits
Telikom PNG Limited	Milne Bay	641 XXXX to 643 XXXX	Seven digits
Telikom PNG Limited	MobileSAT	644 XXXX	Seven digits
Telikom PNG Limited	Western	645 XXXX to 646 XXXX	Seven digits
Telikom PNG Limited	Gulf	648 XXXX	Seven digits
Telikom PNG Limited	Tabubil/Klunga	649 XXXX	Seven digits
Telikom PNG Limited	Momase region		
Telikom PNG Limited	Madang	422 XXXX to 424 XXXX	Seven digits
Telikom PNG Limited	East Sepik	450 XXXX	Seven digits
Telikom PNG Limited	East Sepik	456 XXXX	Seven digits
Telikom PNG Limited	Sandaun	457 XXXX to 459 XXXX	Seven digits
Telikom PNG Limited	Highlands region		
Telikom PNG Limited	Eastern Highlands	530 XXXX to 532 XXXX	Seven digits
Telikom PNG Limited	Eastern Highlands	537 XXXX	Seven digits
Telikom PNG Limited	Chimbu	535 XXXX	Seven digits
Telikom PNG Limited	Southern Highlands	540 XXXX	Seven digits
Telikom PNG Limited	Southern Highlands	549 XXXX	Seven digits
Telikom PNG Limited	Western Highlands	541 XXXX to 542 XXXX	Seven digits
Telikom PNG Limited	Western Highlands	545 XXXX to 546 XXXX	Seven digits
Telikom PNG Limited	Enga	547 XXXX	Seven digits
Telikom PNG Limited	Islands region		
Telikom PNG Limited	Manus	970 XXXX	Seven digits
Telikom PNG Limited	North Solomons	973 XXXX	Seven digits
Telikom PNG Limited	North Solomons	975 XXXX to 976 XXXX	Seven digits
Telikom PNG Limited	East New Britain	980 XXXX to 982 XXXX	Seven digits
Telikom PNG Limited	East New Britain	985 XXXX	Seven digits
Telikom PNG Limited	East New Britain	987 XXXX	Seven digits
Telikom PNG Limited	East New Britain	989 XXXX	Seven digits
Telikom PNG Limited	New Ireland	983 XXXX	Seven digits
Telikom PNG Limited	West New Britain	984 XXXX	Seven digits

== Other allocations ==
List of allocations
Telikom PNG Limited	Radio Paging Terminals	270 XXXX
Telikom PNG Limited	Radio Paging	271 XXXX
Telikom PNG Limited	VSAT Systems	275 XXXX
Telikom PNG Limited	TeliSat	276 XXXX
Telikom PNG Limited	DomSat	278 XXXX
Digivoip Communications Limited	VoIP service	207 XXXX
Digitec PNG Limited	VoIP service	204 XXXX
Oceanic Broadband	VoIP service	203 XXXX
Digicel (PNG) Limited	VoIP service	202 XXXX
Telikom PNG Limited	VoIP service	200 XXXX
Bemobile Limited	VoIP service	201 XXXX

== Mobile allocations ==
Allocations
Operator	Service	Mobile number series (eight digits)
Digicel (PNG) Limited – trading as Digicel PNG	Nationwide	
Digicel (PNG) Limited – trading as Digicel PNG	Nationwide	70XX XXXX
Digicel (PNG) Limited – trading as Digicel PNG	Nationwide	71XX XXXX
Digicel (PNG) Limited – trading as Digicel PNG	Nationwide	72XX XXXX
Digicel (PNG) Limited – trading as Digicel PNG	Nationwide	73XX XXXX
Digicel (PNG) Limited – trading as Digicel PNG	Nationwide	74XX XXXX
Digicel (PNG) Limited – trading as Digicel PNG	Nationwide	79XX XXXX
Digicel (PNG) Limited – trading as Digicel PNG	Nationwide	88XX XXXX
Bemobile (PNG) Limited – trading as BeMobile	Nationwide	
Bemobile (PNG) Limited – trading as BeMobile	Nationwide	75XX XXXX
Bemobile (PNG) Limited – trading as BeMobile	Nationwide	76XX XXXX
Bemobile (PNG) Limited – trading as BeMobile	Nationwide	77XX XXXX
Telikom PNG Limited – trading as Telikom PNG	Nationwide	
Telikom PNG Limited – trading as Telikom PNG	Nationwide	78XX XXXX
Digitec Communications Limited - trading as Vodafone PNG	Nationwide	
Digitec Communications Limited - trading as Vodafone PNG	Nationwide	81XX XXXX
Digitec Communications Limited - trading as Vodafone PNG	Nationwide	82XX XXXX
Digitec Communications Limited - trading as Vodafone PNG	Nationwide	84XX XXXX

== new information ==
Broadly numbers are allocated to the following categories:

- 0xx(x) = operator services
- 180 xxxx = free call services
- 188 xxxx = local call services
- 2xx xxxx = satellite telephones
- 3xx xxxx = Port Moresby/Papua region
- 4xx xxxx = Lae/Morobe region
- 5xx xxxx = Mount Hagen/Highlands region
- 6xx xxxx = Daru/Fly region
- 69x xxxx = AMPS mobile (no longer in use)
- 68x xxxx = Mobile GSM
- 7xx xxxx = Goroka/Eastern Highlands region
- 8xx xxxx = Madang/Sepik region
- 9xx xxxx = New Guinea Islands region

== See also ==
- Communications in Papua New Guinea
