= Telephone numbers in Vanuatu =

- Country: Vanuatu
- Continent: Oceania
- Country code: +678
- International access: 00

== +678 ==
National Significant Numbers (NSN):

The minimum number length (excluding the country code) is 5 digits.

== Numbering Plan in Vanuatu ==
LIST OF ALLOCATIONS
NDC (National Destination Code) or leading digits of NSN (National Significant Number)	NSN number length		Usage of E.164 Number	Additional Information
NDC (National Destination Code) or leading digits of NSN (National Significant Number)	Maximum length	Minimum length	Usage of E.164 Number	Additional Information
00-07		Invalid		00-07 are invalid
080		Invalid		08xxxx are invalid
0811	Six	Six	Toll Free (Telecom Vanuatu Ltd)	0811xx are valid
0812-0817		Invalid		0812xx-0817xx are invalid
0818	Six	Six	Toll Free (Digicel Vanuatu Ltd)	0818xx are valid
0819-089		Invalid		0819xx-089xx are invalid
0900		Invalid	Premium rate services	0900xxx are invalid
10		Invalid		10X are invalid
11X	Three	Three	Life & safety short codes	11X are valid
12-14	Three	Three	On-net short codes	12x-14x are valid
15	Three	Three	Off-net VAS SMS short codes	15x are valid
16	Three	Three	Off-net and public information short codes	16x are valid
17	Three	Three	On-net short codes	17x are valid
18	Three	Three	Off-net VAS SMS short codes	18x are valid
19	Three	Three	Directory and customer assistance short codes	19x are valid
20	Five	Five	Fixed network telephone service (Telecom Vanuatu Ltd)	20xxx are valid
21		Invalid		21xxx are invalid
22-29	Five	Five	Fixed network telephone service (Telecom Vanuatu Ltd)	22xxx-29xxx are valid, SHEFA Province and Port-Vila Areas
30	Five	Five	Non-geographic (Telecom Vanuatu Ltd)	30xxx are valid
31-32		Invalid		31xxx-32xxx are invalid
33	Five	Five	Government Fixed Network (Digicel Vanuatu Ltd)	33xxx are valid
340-349	Five	Five	Fixed - non-geographic (Digicel Vanuatu Ltd)	340xx-349xx are valid
35	Five	Five	Fixed network telephone service (Telecom Vanuatu Ltd)	35xxx are valid
36	Five	Five	Fixed network telephone service (Telecom Vanuatu Ltd)	36xxx are valid, SANMA Province
37	Five	Five	Fixed network telephone service (Telecom Vanuatu Ltd)	37xxx are valid, Luganville area
380-388	Five	Five	Fixed network telephone service (Telecom Vanuatu Ltd)	380xx-388xx are valid, PENAMA and TORBA Provinces
389		Invalid		389xx are invalid
39		Invalid		39xxx are invalid
40-47		Invalid		40xxx-47xxx are invalid
480-483		Invalid		480xx-483xx are invalid
484-489	Five	Five	Fixed network telephone service (Telecom Vanuatu Ltd)	484xx-489xx are valid, MALAMPA Province
49		Invalid		49xxx are invalid
50-52	Seven	Seven	Cellular mobile service (Digicel Vanuatu Ltd)	50xxxxx-52xxxxx are valid
53-56	Seven	Seven	Cellular mobile service (Digicel Vanuatu Ltd)	53xxxxx-56xxxxx are valid
570-571		Invalid		570xxxx-571xxxx are invalid
572-575	Seven	Seven	Cellular mobile service (Digicel Vanuatu Ltd)	572xxxx-575xxxx are valid
576-579		Invalid		576xxxx-579xxxx are invalid
58	Seven	Seven	Cellular mobile service (Digicel Vanuatu Ltd)	58XXXXX are valid
59	Seven	Seven	Cellular mobile service (Digicel Vanuatu Ltd)	59XXXXX are valid
6		Invalid		All numbers commencing with 6 are invalid
70-71	Seven	Seven	Cellular mobile service (Telecom Vanuatu Ltd)	70xxxxx-71xxxxx are valid
72		Invalid		72xxxxx are invalid
73-76	Seven	Seven	Cellular mobile service (Telecom Vanuatu Ltd)	73xxxxx-76xxxxx are valid
77	Seven	Seven	Cellular mobile service (Telecom Vanuatu Ltd)	77xxxxx are valid
78-79		Invalid		78xxxxx – 79xxxxx are invalid
80-87		Invalid		80xxx-87xxx are invalid
88	Five	Five	Fixed network telephone service (Telecom Vanuatu Ltd)	88xxx are valid, TAFEA Province
89		Invalid		89xxx are invalid
9000-9009	Seven	Seven	WanTok	900xxxx are valid
901-909	Seven	Seven	Nomadic/Voice over IP (WanTok Networks Ltd)	901xxxx-909xxxx are valid
91-99		Invalid		91xxxxx-99xxxxx are invalid
99		Invalid		99xxxxx are invalid

== See also ==
- Telecommunications in Vanuatu
