= Telephone numbers in Eritrea =

- Country: Eritrea
- Continent: Africa
- Country code: +291

The following are the telephone codes in Eritrea.

== Allocations in Eritrea ==
LIST OF NEW FIXED CDMA ALLOCATIONS in 2009
Area code	Subscriber number	Usage
8	XXXXXX	Fixed CDMA

LIST OF NEW MOBILE ALLOCATIONS in 2004
Area code	Subscriber number	Usage
7	XXXXXX	Mobile services

Mobile telephone services began in May 2001. However, no allocation data is available.

LIST OF NEW MOBILE ALLOCATIONS in 2001
Area code	Subscriber number	Exchange
1	71XXXX	Agordat
1	72XXXX	Tessenei
1	73XXXX	Barentu

LIST OF ALLOCATIONS in 1999
Area code	Subscriber number
1	11XXXX
1	12XXXX
1	15XXXX (as of 22 May 1999)
1	16XXXX
1	18XXXX
1	20XXXX
1	40XXXX
1	55XXXX
1	61XXXX
1	64XXXX
1	66XXXX
