= Telephone numbers in Tajikistan =

Location
- Country: Tajikistan
- Continent: Asia
- NSN length: 4 to 9

Access codes
- Country code: +992
- International access: 8~10

National Significant Numbers (NSN): four to nine digits.

The International dialling format for Tajikistan varies from 7 to 12 digits:

+992 ABCD XXXXX (for ABCD area codes)
+992 ABCDE XXXX (for ABCDE area codes)
+992 ABCDEF XXX (for ABCDEF area codes)

e.g. for Dushanbe: +992 372 XXXXXX (Area code: three digits. Subscriber number: six digits).

Mobile numbers: +992 55 XXX XXXX

== Area codes in Tajikistan ==
LIST OF AREA CODES
| Name of cities, regions, districts | Long distance code | Zone code | Subscriber number | Dialling format |
|---|---|---|---|---|
| Dushanbe | 37 | 2 | 2X XXXX; 3X XXXX | +992 372 2X XXXX +992 372 3X XXXX |
Centre of Dushanbe (officially «Districts of Republican subjecting»)
| Varzob | 31 | 53 | 2 XXXX | +992 3153 2 XXXX |
| Vakhdat (F. Kofarnikhon) | 31 | 36 | 2 XXXX | +992 3136 2 XXXX |
| Hissar | 31 | 39 | 2 XXXX | +992 3139 2 XXXX |
| Jirgital | 31 | 32 | 2 XXXX | +992 3132 2 XXXX |
| Nurobod (F. Darband) | 31 | 33 | 2 XXXX | +992 3133 2 XXXX |
| Nurek | 31 | 38 | 2 XXXX | +992 3138 2 XXXX |
| Rasht (F. Garm) | 31 | 31 | 2 XXXX | +992 3131 2 XXXX |
| Rudaki (F. Leninskiy) | 31 | 37 | 2 XXXX | +992 3137 2 XXXX |
| Rogun | 31 | 34 | 2 XXXX | +992 3134 2 XXXX |
| Tadjikabad | 31 | 54 | 2 XXXX | +992 3154 2 XXXX |
| Tursun-Zade | 31 | 30 | 2 XXXX | +992 3130 2 XXXX |
| Tavildara | 31 | 56 | 2 XXXX | +992 3156 2 XXXX |
| Fayzabad | 31 | 35 | 3 XXXX | +992 3135 3 XXXX |
| Shakhrinav | 31 | 55 | 3 XXXX | +992 3155 3 XXXX |
| Yavan | 31 | 41 | 2 XXXX | +992 3141 2 XXXX |
Khatlon area (area zone Kurgan-Tube)
| Abdurakhmana Jami (F. Khudjamaston) | 32 | 43 | 2 XXXX | +992 3243 2 XXXX |
| Bokhtar | 32 | 45 | 2 XXXX | +992 3245 2 XXXX |
| Vakhsh | 32 | 46 | 2 XXXX | +992 3246 2 XXXX |
| Djilikul | 32 | 48 | 2 XXXX | +992 3248 2 XXXX |
| Kurgan-Tube | 32 | 22 | 2 XXXX; 3 XXXX | +992 3222 2 XXXX +992 3222 3 XXXX |
| Kumsangir (C. Dusti) | 32 | 49 | 4 XXXX | +992 3249 4 XXXX |
| Kabodion | 32 | 51 | 2 XXXX | +992 3251 2 XXXX |
| Kolkhozabad | 32 | 47 | 4 XXXX | +992 3247 4 XXXX |
| Nosiri Khusrav (F. Beshkent) | Through Shaartuz operator | | | |
| Panj | 32 | 52 | 2 XXXX | +992 3252 2 XXXX |
| Sarband | 32 | 50 | 6 XXXX | +992 3250 6 XXXX |
| Khuroson (F. Gozimalik) | 32 | 42 | 2 XXXX | +992 3242 2 XXXX |
| Shaartuz | 32 | 40 | 2 XXXX | +992 3240 2 XXXX |
Khatlon area (area zone Kulyab)
| Vose | 33 | 11 | 2 XXXX | +992 3311 2 XXXX |
| Dangara | 33 | 12 | 2 XXXX | +992 3312 2 XXXX |
| Kulyab | 33 | 22 | 2 XXXX; 3 XXXX | +992 3322 2 XXXX +992 3322 3 XXXX |
| M. Khamadoni (F. Moskowskiy) | 33 | 15 | 2 XXXX | +992 3315 2 XXXX |
| Muminobod | 33 | 18 | 2 XXXX | +992 3318 2 XXXX |
| Parkhar | 33 | 16 | 2 XXXX | +992 3316 2 XXXX |
| Temurmalik (F. Sovetskiy) | 33 | 14 | 2 XXXX | +992 3314 2 XXXX |
| Khovaling | 33 | 17 | 00 2 XX | +992 331700 2 XX |
| Shurabad | Through Dushanbe operator | | | |
Sogd area (Centre Khujand)
| Asht | 34 | 53 | 2 XXXX | +992 3453 2 XXXX |
| Ayni | 34 | 79 | 2 XXXX | +992 3479 2 XXXX |
| Ganchi | 34 | 64 | 2 XXXX | +992 3464 2 XXXX |
| Gafurov | 34 | 42 | 3 XXXX | +992 3442 3 XXXX |
| Jabarrasulov (F. Proletarskiy) | 34 | 55 | 2 XXXX | +992 3455 2 XXXX |
| Zafarabad | 34 | 52 | 5 XXXX | +992 3452 5 XXXX |
| Isfara | 34 | 62 | 2 XXXX | +992 3462 2 XXXX |
| Istravshan | 34 | 54 | 2 XXXX | +992 3454 2 XXXX |
| Kayrakum | 34 | 43 | 2 XXXX | +992 3443 2 XXXX |
| Kanibadam | 34 | 67 | 3 XXXX | +992 3467 3 XXXX |
| Matchinskiy (C. Buston) | 34 | 45 | 2 XXXX | +992 3445 2 XXXX |
| Pendjikent | 34 | 75 | 5 XXXX | +992 3475 5 XXXX |
| Spitamen (F. Nou) | 34 | 41 | 2 XXXX | +992 3441 2 XXXX |
| Taboshar | 34 | 65 | 2 XXXX | +992 3465 2 XXXX |
Sogd area (centre Khujand)
| Khujand | 34 | 22 | 2 XXXX; 4 XXXX; 5 XXXX; 6 XXXX | +992 3422 2 XXXX +992 3422 4 XXXX +992 3422 5 XXXX +992 3422 6 XXXX |
| Chkalovsk | 34 | 51 | 5 XXXX | +992 3451 5 XXXX |
| Shakhristan | 34 | 56 | 2 XXXX | +992 3456 2 XXXX |
Mountain – Autonomous Region Badahshan (Centre Khorog)
| Vanj | 35 | 51 | 2 XXXX | +992 3551 2 XXXX |
| Darvaz (F. Kalaykhumb) | 35 | 52 | 2 XXXX | +992 3552 2 XXXX |
| Ishkashim | 35 | 53 | 2 XXXX | +992 3553 2 XXXX |
| Murgab | 35 | 54 | 2 XXXX | +992 3554 2 XXXX |
| Rushan | 35 | 56 | 2 XXXX | +992 3556 2 XXXX |
| Roshtkala | 35 | 55 | 2 XXXX | +992 3555 2 XXXX |
| Khorog | 35 | 22 | 2 XXXX | +992 3522 2 XXXX |
