= Telephone numbers in Ecuador =

Location
- Country: Ecuador
- Continent: South America

Access codes
- Country code: +593
- International access: 00
- Long-distance: 0

The Numbering Plan as defined by the national regulator can be found in: Fundamental Numbering Plan.

== Numbering Plan ==
Prefix	X	Type	Description
1X	XY/XYZ		Subscriber short codes
	700	"Smart"	Universal Access Number / Shared Cost
	800	"Smart"	Freephone
	900	"Smart"	Information Services
2X	2	Geo	Pichincha, Santo Domingo de los Tsachilas
	3	Geo	Tungurahua, Cotopaxi, Pastaza, Bolivar, Chimborazo
	4	Geo	Guayas, Peninsula de Santa Elena
	5	Geo	Manabi, Galapagos, Los Rios
	6	Geo	Carchi, Imbabura, Esmeraldas, Sucumbios, Napo, Orellana
	7	Geo	Azuay, Canar, Morona Santiago
	8	Geo	El Oro, Loja, Zamora
3X		Res	Reserved
4X		Res	Reserved
5X	1	Non-Geo	Universal Personal Telecommunications (UPT)
	2	Non-Geo	Universal Personal Telecommunications (UPT)
	3	Non-Geo	Universal Personal Telecommunications (UPT)
	4	Non-Geo	Universal Personal Telecommunications (UPT)
	5	Non-Geo	Universal Personal Telecommunications (UPT)
6X		Res	Reserved
7X	1	Non-Geo	Nomadic Services
	2	Non-Geo	Nomadic Services
	3	Non-Geo	Nomadic Services
	6	Non-Geo	M2M
	7	Non-Geo	M2M
	8	Non-Geo	M2M
	9	Non-Geo	M2M
8X		Non-Geo	Services and others
9X		Non-Geo	Mobile Networks

== Special Numbers ==
- International Dial-Out Prefix: 00
- Long-distance Dial-Out Prefix: 0
- Fire brigade: 102
- Police: 101
- Ambulance: 911
- Toll-free numbers: 1-700, 1-800

== Calling ==
- To call a local number from a landline-phone, dial directly the 7 digits of the subscriber (xxx-xxxx).
- To make a national long-distance call, or from any mobile phone to a local or national number, dial (0a) xxx-xxxx (For example, to a number in Pichincha province, (02) 211-1111).
- To call from outside the country to a landline, dial +593-a-xxx-xxxx (For example, to a number in Guayas province, +593-4-211-1111)
- To call from outside the country to a mobile (cellular) phone, according to ITU Document at https://www.itu.int/dms_pub/itu-t/oth/02/02/T020200003D0001PDFE.pdf, it should look like:

International mobile number for Ecuador
Country code (CC)	Network code (DN)	Subscriber number (SN)
593	9X	XXX-XXXX
593	92	9XX-XXXX
593	93	9XX-XXXX
593	94	9XX-XXXX
593	95	9XX-XXXX
593	96	9XX-XXXX
593	97	9XX-XXXX
593	98	XXX-XXXX
593	99	XXX-XXXX
