= Telephone numbers in São Tomé and Príncipe =

- Country: São Tomé and Príncipe
- Continent: Africa
- Country code: +239
- International access: 00

The following are the telephone codes in São Tomé and Príncipe.

== Calling formats ==
- yyy xxxx - Calls inside São Tomé and Príncipe
- +239 yyy xxxx - Calls from outside São Tomé and Príncipe

The NSN length is seven digits and there are no area codes.

== Allocations ==
LIST OF ALLOCATIONS
First digit	Description
0	Reserved (future use)
1	Special numbering and short numbers (e.g., emergency, information, ...)
2	Fixed telephone service numbers
3	Reserved (Nomadic services)
4	Reserved (future use)
5	Reserved (future use)
6	Non-geographic numbers (premium rate services, audiotex, ...)
7	Non-geographic numbers (VPN, UPN, ...)
8	Non-geographic numbers (national freephone numbers, IFS, HCD, UPS, ...)
9	Mobile services

== List of number ranges in São Tomé and Príncipe ==
LIST OF NUMBER RANGES
Telephone Number	Area/City
222 0000 to 222 0199	Santo Amaro
222 1000 to 222 8999	Água Grande
223 1000 to 223 1199	Guadalupe
223 3000 to 223 3299	Neves, Santa Catarina
224 0000 to 224 9999	Água Grande
225 1000 to 225 1399	Região Autonoma do Príncipe
226 1000 to 226 1199	Angolares, Porto Alegre
226 5000 to 226 5299	Santana, Ribeira Afonso
227 1000 to 227 1999	Trindade
227 2100 to 227 2199	Madalena
228 0000 to 228 9999	Água Grande
229 0000 to 229 9999	Água Grande
624 0000 to 624 9999	ISP – Companhia Santomense de Telecomunicações (CST)
980 0000 to 999 9999	Mobile GSM – CST
