= Telephone numbers in Senegal =

- Country: Senegal
- Continent: Africa
- Country code: +221
- International access: 00
- Long-distance: none

The following are the telephone codes in Senegal.

== Prefixes ==
PREFIXES
| Operator | Mobile | Fixed |
|---|---|---|
| Sonatel/Orange | 78 | 33 |
| Sentel/Tigo | 76 | 32 |
| Expresso | 70 | 30 |
| Hayo/CSU | 72 | 36 |
| Sirius Telecoms Afrique | 754, 755, 756 | - |
| Origines SA | 757 | - |

== List of area codes in Senegal ==
LIST OF AREA CODES
| Area/City | Area Code |
|---|---|
| Dakar | 8 |
| outside Dakar | 9 |

Area codes are prefixed with 30 or 33 depending on the operator.

== Mobile allocations ==
LIST OF MOBILE ALLOCATIONS
| NSN (NDC + SN) | | NSN number length | Usage of E.164 Number | Additional information |
| Prefix | BP | NSN number length | Usage of E.164 Number | Additional information |
|---|---|---|---|---|
| 70 | 10X XXXX | 9 | CDMA Mobile telephony | Expresso/Sudatel |
| 70 | 20X XXXX | 9 | CDMA Mobile telephony | Expresso/Sudatel |
| 70 | 50X XXXX | 9 | CDMA Mobile telephony | Expresso/Sudatel |
| 70 | 60X XXXX | 9 | CDMA Mobile telephony | Expresso/Sudatel |
| 75 | 4XX XXX | 9 | MVNO | Non-geographic, Sirius Telecoms Afrique (Promobile) |
| 75 | 5XX XXX | 9 | MVNO | Non-geographic, Sirius Telecoms Afrique (Promobile) |
| 75 | 6XX XXX | 9 | MVNO | Non-geographic, Sirius Telecoms Afrique (Promobile) |
| 75 | 7XX XXX | 9 | MVNO | Non-geographic, Origines SA |
| 76 | 12X XXXX | 9 | GSM Mobile telephony | Expresso/Sudatel |
| 76 | 13X XXXX | 9 | GSM Mobile telephony | Sentel GSM (Tigo) |
| 76 | 28X XXXX | 9 | GSM Mobile telephony | Sentel GSM (Tigo) |
| 76 | 29X XXXX | 9 | GSM Mobile telephony | Sentel GSM (Tigo) |
| 76 | 33X XXXX | 9 | GSM Mobile telephony | Sentel GSM (Tigo) |
| 76 | 34X XXXX | 9 | GSM Mobile telephony | Sentel GSM (Tigo) |
| 76 | 38X XXXX | 9 | GSM Mobile telephony | Sentel GSM (Tigo) |
| 76 | 39X XXXX | 9 | GSM Mobile telephony | Sentel GSM (Tigo) |
| 76 | 46X XXXX | 9 | GSM Mobile telephony | Sentel GSM (Tigo) |
| 76 | 47X XXXX | 9 | GSM Mobile telephony | Sentel GSM (Tigo) |
| 76 | 48X XXXX | 9 | GSM Mobile telephony | Sentel GSM (Tigo) |
| 76 | 49X XXXX | 9 | GSM Mobile telephony | Sentel GSM (Tigo) |
| 76 | 51X XXXX | 9 | GSM Mobile telephony | Sentel GSM (Tigo) |
| 76 | 52X XXXX | 9 | GSM Mobile telephony | Sentel GSM (Tigo) |
| 76 | 53X XXXX | 9 | GSM Mobile telephony | Sentel GSM (Tigo) |
| 76 | 58X XXXX | 9 | GSM Mobile telephony | Sentel GSM (Tigo) |
| 76 | 59X XXXX | 9 | GSM Mobile telephony | Sentel GSM (Tigo) |
| 76 | 66X XXXX | 9 | GSM Mobile telephony | Sentel GSM (Tigo) |
| 76 | 67X XXXX | 9 | GSM Mobile telephony | Sentel GSM (Tigo) |
| 76 | 68X XXXX | 9 | GSM Mobile telephony | Sentel GSM (Tigo) |
| 76 | 69X XXXX | 9 | GSM Mobile telephony | Sentel GSM (Tigo) |
| 76 | 74X XXXX | 9 | GSM Mobile telephony | Sentel GSM (Tigo) |
| 76 | 75X XXXX | 9 | GSM Mobile telephony | Sentel GSM (Tigo) |
| 76 | 83X XXXX | 9 | GSM Mobile telephony | Sentel GSM (Tigo) |
| 76 | 84X XXXX | 9 | GSM Mobile telephony | Sentel GSM (Tigo) |
| 76 | 85X XXXX | 9 | GSM Mobile telephony | Sentel GSM (Tigo) |
| 76 | 86X XXXX | 9 | GSM Mobile telephony | Sentel GSM (Tigo) |
| 76 | 87X XXXX | 9 | GSM Mobile telephony | Sentel GSM (Tigo) |
| 76 | 88X XXXX | 9 | GSM Mobile telephony | Sentel GSM (Tigo) |
| 77 | 10 | 9 | GSM Mobile telephony | Sonatel Mobiles (Orange) |
| 77 | 11X XXXX | 9 | GSM Mobile telephony | Sonatel Mobiles (Orange) |
| 77 | 14X XXXX | 9 | GSM Mobile telephony | Sonatel Mobiles (Orange) |
| 77 | 15X XXXX | 9 | GSM Mobile telephony | Sonatel Mobiles (Orange) |
| 77 | 16X XXXX | 9 | GSM Mobile telephony | Sonatel Mobiles (Orange) |
| 77 | 17X XXXX | 9 | GSM Mobile telephony | Sonatel Mobiles (Orange) |
| 77 | 18X XXXX | 9 | GSM Mobile telephony | Sonatel Mobiles (Orange) |
| 77 | 20X XXXX | 9 | GSM Mobile telephony | Sonatel Mobiles (Orange) |
| 77 | 21X XXXX | 9 | GSM Mobile telephony | Sonatel Mobiles (Orange) |
| 77 | 22X XXXX | 9 | GSM Mobile telephony | Sonatel Mobiles (Orange) |
| 77 | 23X XXXX | 9 | GSM Mobile telephony | Sonatel Mobiles (Orange) |
| 77 | 24X XXXX | 9 | GSM Mobile telephony | Sonatel Mobiles (Orange) |
| 77 | 25X XXXX | 9 | GSM Mobile telephony | Sonatel Mobiles (Orange) |
| 77 | 26X XXXX | 9 | GSM Mobile telephony | Sonatel Mobiles (Orange) |
| 77 | 27X XXXX | 9 | GSM Mobile telephony | Sonatel Mobiles (Orange) |
| 77 | 30X XXXX | 9 | GSM Mobile telephony | Sonatel Mobiles (Orange) |
| 77 | 31X XXXX | 9 | GSM Mobile telephony | Sonatel Mobiles (Orange) |
| 77 | 32X XXXX | 9 | GSM Mobile telephony | Sonatel Mobiles (Orange) |
| 77 | 33X XXXX | 9 | GSM Mobile telephony | Sonatel Mobiles (Orange) |
| 77 | 34X XXXX | 9 | GSM Mobile telephony | Sonatel Mobiles (Orange) |
| 77 | 35X XXXX | 9 | GSM Mobile telephony | Sonatel Mobiles (Orange) |
| 77 | 36X XXXX | 9 | GSM Mobile telephony | Sonatel Mobiles (Orange) |
| 77 | 37X XXXX | 9 | GSM Mobile telephony | Sonatel Mobiles (Orange) |
| 77 | 38X XXXX | 9 | GSM Mobile telephony | Sonatel Mobiles (Orange) |
| 77 | 40X XXXX | 9 | GSM Mobile telephony | Sonatel Mobiles (Orange) |
| 77 | 41X XXXX | 9 | GSM Mobile telephony | Sonatel Mobiles (Orange) |
| 77 | 42X XXXX | 9 | GSM Mobile telephony | Sonatel Mobiles (Orange) |
| 77 | 43X XXXX | 9 | GSM Mobile telephony | Sonatel Mobiles (Orange) |
| 77 | 44X XXXX | 9 | GSM Mobile telephony | Sonatel Mobiles (Orange) |
| 77 | 45X XXXX | 9 | GSM Mobile telephony | Sonatel Mobiles (Orange) |
| 77 | 46X XXXX | 9 | GSM Mobile telephony | Sonatel Mobiles (Orange) |
| 77 | 5XX XXXX | 9 | GSM Mobile telephony | Sonatel Mobiles (Orange) |
| 77 | 6XX XXXX | 9 | GSM Mobile telephony | Sonatel Mobiles (Orange) |
| 77 | 70X XXXX | 9 | GSM Mobile telephony | Sonatel Mobiles (Orange) |
| 77 | 71X XXXX | 9 | GSM Mobile telephony | Sonatel Mobiles (Orange) |
| 77 | 72X XXXX | 9 | GSM Mobile telephony | Sonatel Mobiles (Orange) |
| 77 | 73X XXXX | 9 | GSM Mobile telephony | Sonatel Mobiles (Orange) |
| 77 | 78X XXXX | 9 | GSM Mobile telephony | Sonatel Mobiles (Orange) |
| 77 | 79X XXXX | 9 | GSM Mobile telephony | Sonatel Mobiles (Orange) |
| 77 | 80X XXXX | 9 | GSM Mobile telephony | Sonatel Mobiles (Orange) |
| 77 | 81X XXXX | 9 | GSM Mobile telephony | Sonatel Mobiles (Orange) |
| 77 | 90X XXXX | 9 | Mobile GSM | Sonatel Mobiles (Orange) |
| 77 | 91X XXXX | 9 | Mobile GSM | Sonatel Mobiles (Orange) |
| 30 | 10X XXXX | 9 | CDMA Fixed telephony | Expresso/Sudatel |
| 33 | 81X XXXX | 9 | Fixed telephony service | Sonatel |
| 33 | 82X XXXX | 9 | Fixed telephony service | Sonatel |
| 33 | 83X XXXX | 9 | Fixed telephony service | Sonatel |
| 33 | 84X XXXX | 9 | Fixed telephony service | Sonatel |
| 33 | 85X XXXX | 9 | Fixed telephony service | Sonatel |
| 33 | 86X XXXX | 9 | Fixed telephony service | Sonatel |
| 33 | 87X XXXX | 9 | Fixed telephony service | Sonatel |
| 33 | 88X XXXX | 9 | Fixed telephony service | Sonatel |
| 33 | 89X XXXX | 9 | Fixed telephony service | Sonatel |
| 33 | 92X XXXX | 9 | Satellite Telephony | Sonatel |
| 33 | 93X XXXX | 9 | Fixed telephony service | Sonatel |
| 33 | 94X XXXX | 9 | Fixed telephony service | Sonatel |
| 33 | 95X XXXX | 9 | Fixed telephony service | Sonatel |
| 33 | 96X XXXX | 9 | Fixed telephony service | Sonatel |
| 33 | 97X XXXX | 9 | Fixed telephony service | Sonatel |
| 33 | 98X XXXX | 9 | Fixed telephony service | Sonatel |
| 33 | 99X XXXX | 9 | Fixed telephony service | Sonatel |
| 33 | 301 XXXX | 9 | Voice IP | Sonatel |

=== See also ===
- Telecommunications in Senegal
