= Telephone numbers in Wallis and Futuna =

Location
- Country: Wallis and Futuna
- Continent: Oceania
- NSN length: 6
- Format: +681 XX XXXX

Access codes
- Country code: +681
- International access: 00

== Number plan ==
ALLOCATIONS
| Number range | Service |
|---|---|
| +681 40 XXXX | Mobile telephony services - Manuia - Forwarding to voicemail |
| +681 499 XXX | Mobile telephony services - Manuia - Roaming Number (MSRN) |
| +681 72 XXXX | Fixed telephony services |
| +681 80 XXXX | Mobile telephony services - Manuia - Voicemail remote access |
| +681 82 XXXX | Mobile telephony services - Manuia - Wallis subscribers |
| +681 83 XXXX | Mobile telephony services - Manuia - Futuna subscribers |
