= Telephone numbers in Kyrgyzstan =

- Location of Kyrgyzstan
- Country: Kyrgyzstan
- Continent: Asia
- Numbering plan type: Closed
- NSN length: 9
- Country code: +996
- International access: 00
- Long-distance: 0

== Calling formats ==
- +996 XXX XXXXXX for calls from outside Kyrgyzstan
- 0XXX XXXXXX or 0XXXX XXXXX for calls within Kyrgyzstan.

The NSN length is nine digits.

== National Numbering Plan (NNP) of the Kyrgyz Republic ==
LIST OF AREA CODES
International number or range	Usage of international number or range	Additional network information
+996 22X XXXXXX	Mobile	Sky Mobile (Beeline KG)
+996 312 XXXXXX	Geographic; Bishkek	
+996 312 2XXXXX	Geographic; Bishkek	KyrgyzTelecom
+996 312 4XXXXX	Geographic; Bishkek	KyrgyzTelecom
+996 312 50XXXX	Geographic; Bishkek	KyrgyzTelecom
+996 312 51XXXX	Geographic; Bishkek	KyrgyzTelecom
+996 312 52XXXX	Geographic; Bishkek	KyrgyzTelecom
+996 312 53XXXX	Geographic; Bishkek	KyrgyzTelecom
+996 312 54XXXX	Geographic; Bishkek	KyrgyzTelecom
+996 312 55XXXX	Geographic; Bishkek	KyrgyzTelecom
+996 312 56XXXX	Geographic; Bishkek	KyrgyzTelecom
+996 312 57XXXX	Geographic; Bishkek	KyrgyzTelecom
+996 312 58XXXX	Geographic	Sky Mobile
+996 312 59XXXX	Geographic; Bishkek	KyrgyzTelecom
+996 312 60XXXX	Geographic; Bishkek	KyrgyzTelecom
+996 312 61XXXX	Geographic; Bishkek	KyrgyzTelecom
+996 312 62XXXX	Geographic; Bishkek	KyrgyzTelecom
+996 312 63XXXX	Geographic; Bishkek	KyrgyzTelecom
+996 312 64XXXX	Geographic; Bishkek	KyrgyzTelecom
+996 312 65XXXX	Geographic; Bishkek	KyrgyzTelecom
+996 312 66XXXX	Geographic; Bishkek	KyrgyzTelecom
+996 312 67XXXX	Geographic; Bishkek	KyrgyzTelecom
+996 312 68XXXX	Geographic; Bishkek	KyrgyzTelecom
+996 312 69XXXX	Geographic; Bishkek	WinLine
+996 312 7XXXXX	Geographic, Bishkek	Katel
+996 312 87XXXX	Geographic; Bishkek	WinLine
+996 312 89XXXX	Geographic; Bishkek	WinLine
+996 312 90XXXX	Geographic; Bishkek	Saima-Telecom
+996 312 91XXXX	Geographic; Bishkek	Saima-Telecom
+996 312 92XXXX	Geographic; Bishkek	Saima-Telecom
+996 312 93XXXX	Geographic; Bishkek	WinLine
+996 312 94XXXX	Geographic; Bishkek	Mintel
+996 312 970XXX	Geographic; Bishkek	Totel
+996 312 979XXX	Geographic; Bishkek	Netcom
+996 312 99XXXX	Geographic; Bishkek	Tun-Sun
+996 3131 XXXXX	Geographic; Belovodskoe (Moskovsky district)	
+996 3132 XXXXX	Geographic; Kant (Issyk-Ata district)	
+996 3133 XXXXX	Geographic; Kara-Balta (Jayl district)	
+996 3134 XXXXX	Geographic; Sokuluk (Sokuluk district)	
+996 3135 XXXXX	Geographic; Kemin (Kemin district)	
+996 3137 XXXXX	Geographic; Kaindy (Panfilov district)	
+996 3138 XXXXX	Geographic; Tokmok (Tokmok district)	
+996 3139 XXXXX	Geographic; Lebedinovka (Alamudun district)	
+996 315 2XXXXX	Geographic; Bishkek	KyrgyzTelecom
+996 3161 XXXXX	Geographic; Belovodskoe	KyrgyzTelecom
+996 3162 XXXXX	Geographic; Kant	KyrgyzTelecom
+996 3163 XXXXX	Geographic; Kara-Balta	KyrgyzTelecom
+996 3164 XXXXX	Geographic; Sokuluk	KyrgyzTelecom
+996 3165 XXXXX	Geographic; Kemin	KyrgyzTelecom
+996 3166 XXXXX	Geographic; Lebedinovka	KyrgyzTelecom
+996 3167 XXXXX	Geographic; Kaindy	KyrgyzTelecom
+996 3168 XXXXX	Geographic; Tokmok	KyrgyzTelecom
+996 3222 XXXXX	Geographic; Osh	
+996 3230 XXXXX	Geographic; Eski-Nookat (Nookat district)	
+996 3231 XXXXX	Geographic; Aravan (Aravan district)	
+996 3232 XXXXX	Geographic; Kara-Suu (Kara-Suu district)	
+996 3233 XXXXX	Geographic; Uzgen (Uzgen district)	
+996 3234 XXXXX	Geographic; Gulcha (Alai district)	
+996 3237 XXXXX	Geographic; Daroot-Korgon (Chon-Alai district)	
+996 3239 XXXXX	Geographic; Kara-Kulja (Kara-Kulja district)	
+996 3260 2XXXX	Geographic; Osh	KyrgyzTelecom
+996 3261 XXXXX	Geographic; Aravan	KyrgyzTelecom
+996 3262 XXXXX	Geographic; Gulcha	KyrgyzTelecom
+996 3263 XXXXX	Geographic; Daroot-Korgon	KyrgyzTelecom
+996 3264 XXXXX	Geographic; Kara-Kulja	KyrgyzTelecom
+996 3265 XXXXX	Geographic; Kara-Suu	KyrgyzTelecom
+996 3266 XXXXX	Geographic; Uzgen	KyrgyzTelecom
+996 3267 XXXXX	Geographic; Eski-Nookat	KyrgyzTelecom
+996 3422 XXXXX	Geographic; Talas	
+996 3456 XXXXX	Geographic; Kyzyl-Adyr (Kyzyl-Adyr district)	
+996 3457 XXXXX	Geographic; Bakai-Ata (Bakai-Ata district)	
+996 3458 XXXXX	Geographic; Kok-Oi (Talas district)	
+996 3459 XXXXX	Geographic; Pokrovka (Manas district)	
+996 3460 2XXXX	Geographic; Talas	KyrgyzTelecom
+996 3461 XXXXX	Geographic; Kyzyl-Adyr	KyrgyzTelecom
+996 3462 XXXXX	Geographic; Bakai-Ata	KyrgyzTelecom
+996 3463 XXXXX	Geographic; Kok-Oi	KyrgyzTelecom
+996 3464 XXXXX	Geographic; Pokrovka	KyrgyzTelecom
+996 3522 XXXXX	Geographic; Naryn	
+996 3534 XXXXX	Geographic; At-Bashy (At-Bashy district)	
+996 3535 XXXXX	Geographic; Kochkorka (Kochkor district)	
+996 3536 XXXXX	Geographic; Chaek (Jumgal district)	
+996 3537 XXXXX	Geographic; Baetovo (Ak-Tala district)	
+996 3559 XXXXX	Geographic; Minkush (Minkush district)	
+996 3560 2XXXX	Geographic; Naryn	KyrgyzTelecom
+996 3561 XXXXX	Geographic; At-Bashy	KyrgyzTelecom
+996 3562 XXXXX	Geographic; Baetovo	KyrgyzTelecom
+996 3563 XXXXX	Geographic; Kochkorka	KyrgyzTelecom
+996 3564 XXXXX	Geographic; Minkush	KyrgyzTelecom
+996 3565 XXXXX	Geographic; Chaek	KyrgyzTelecom
+996 3622 XXXXX	Geographic; Batken	
+996 3653 XXXXX	Geographic; Sulukta (City)	
+996 3655 XXXXX	Geographic; Pulgon (Kadamjay district)	
+996 3656 XXXXX	Geographic; Isphana (Laylak district)	
+996 3657 XXXXX	Geographic; Kyzyl-Kiya (City)	
+996 3660 2XXXX	Geographic; Batken	
+996 3661 XXXXX	Geographic; Sulukta	
+996 3662 XXXXX	Geographic; Pulgon	
+996 3663 XXXXX	Geographic; Isphana	
+996 3722 XXXXX	Geographic; Jalal-Abad	
+996 3734 XXXXX	Geographic; Massy (Nooken district)	
+996 3736 XXXXX	Geographic; Bazar-Korgon (Bazar-Korgon district)	
+996 3738 XXXXX	Geographic; Kazarman (Toguz-Toro district)	
+996 3741 XXXXX	Geographic; Ala-Buka (Ala-Buka district)	
+996 3742 XXXXX	Geographic; Kerben (Aksy district)	
+996 3743 XXXXX	Geographic; Kok-Gangak (City)	
+996 3744 XXXXX	Geographic; Mailuu-Suu (City)	
+996 3745 XXXXX	Geographic; Tash-Kumyr (City)	
+996 3746 XXXXX	Geographic; Kara-Kul (City)	
+996 3747 XXXXX	Geographic; Toktogul (Toktogul district)	
+996 3748 XXXXX	Geographic; Suzak (Suzak district)	
+996 3749 XXXXX	Geographic; Chatkal (Jalal-Abad region)	
+996 3760 2XXXX	Geographic; Jalal-Abad	KyrgyzTelecom
+996 3761 XXXXX	Geographic; Ala-Buka	KyrgyzTelecom
+996 3762 XXXXX	Geographic; Bazar-Korgon	KyrgyzTelecom
+996 3763 XXXXX	Geographic; Kazarman	KyrgyzTelecom
+996 3764 XXXXX	Geographic; Kanysh-Kya	KyrgyzTelecom
+996 3765 XXXXX	Geographic; Kara-Kuldja	KyrgyzTelecom
+996 3766 XXXXX	Geographic; Kerben	KyrgyzTelecom
+996 3767 XXXXX	Geographic; Kok-Gangak	KyrgyzTelecom
+996 3768 XXXXX	Geographic; Kochkor-Ata, Massy	KyrgyzTelecom
+996 3769 XXXXX	Geographic; Mailuu-Suu	KyrgyzTelecom
+996 3775 XXXXX	Geographic; Suzak	KyrgyzTelecom
+996 3776 XXXXX	Geographic; Tash-Kumyr	KyrgyzTelecom
+996 3777 XXXXX	Geographic; Toktogul	KyrgyzTelecom
+996 3922 XXXXX	Geographic; Karakol	
+996 3941 XXXXX	Geographic; Kadjy-Sai (Ton district)	
+996 3942 XXXXX	Geographic; Ananevo	
+996 3943 XXXXX	Geographic; Cholpon-Ata (Issyk-Kul district)	
+996 3944 XXXXX	Geographic; Balykchy (City)	
+996 3945 XXXXX	Geographic; Tup (Tup district)	
+996 3946 XXXXX	Geographic; Kyzyl-Suu (Jety-Oguz district)	
+996 3947 XXXXX	Geographic; Bokonbaevo (Ton district)	
+996 3960 2XXXX	Geographic; Karakol	KyrgyzTelecom
+996 3961 XXXXX	Geographic; Kadjy-Sai	KyrgyzTelecom
+996 3962 XXXXX	Geographic; Ananevo	KyrgyzTelecom
+996 3963 XXXXX	Geographic; Cholpon-Ata	KyrgyzTelecom
+996 3964 XXXXX	Geographic; Balykchy	KyrgyzTelecom
+996 3965 XXXXX	Geographic; Tup	KyrgyzTelecom
+996 3966 XXXXX	Geographic; Kyzyl-Suu	KyrgyzTelecom
+996 3967 XXXXX	Geographic; Bokonbaevo	KyrgyzTelecom
+996 3968 XXXXX	Geographic; Aksuu	KyrgyzTelecom
+996 50X XXXXXX	Mobile	Nur Telecom (O!)
+996 51X XXXXXX	Mobile	Katel
+996 52X XXXXXX	Satellite	Ay Sat Systems
+996 522 7XXXXX	Satellite	Ay Sat Systems
+996 522 8XXXXX	Satellite	Ay Sat Systems
+996 54X XXXXXX	Mobile	AkTel (Fonex)
+996 55X XXXXXX	Mobile	Alfa Telecom (MEGA)
+996 56X XXXXXX	Mobile	Winline
+996 57X XXXXXX	Mobile	Sotel
+996 609 6XXXXX	Geographic	Winline
+996 612 6XXXXX	Geographic	Saima-Telecom
+996 622 XXXXXX	Geographic	Elcat
+996 623 2XXXXX	Geographic	Asiainfo
+996 624 2XXXXX	Geographic	KiterraCom
+996 70X XXXXXX	Mobile	Nur Telecom (O!)
+996 77X XXXXXX	Mobile	Sky Mobile (Beeline KG)
+996 800 XXXXXXXX	UIFN	Universal International Freephone Numbers (UIFNs)
+996 800XXXXXX	Freephone	Home country direct
+996 99X XXXXXX	Mobile	Alfa Telecom (MEGA)
101	Fire Department	
102	Police	
103	Medical Emergency	
104	Gas Emergency	
112	Emergency Service	
