= Telephone numbers in Angola =

- Country: Angola
- Continent: Africa
- Regulator: INACOM
- NSN length: 9
- Format: +244 XXX XXX XXX
- Country code: +244
- International access: 00
- Long-distance: 0

Telephone numbers in Angola are 9 digits long (except for special 1xx service numbers like Police and Emergency services), and must always be dialed in their entirety. Land-line (fixed-line) numbers start with digit 2, followed by 1 or 2 digits area code that corresponds to a geographic area. After the area code, there is the telecoms operator identifier, which consists of 1 digit, then the subscriber number. Mobile numbers have no geographic area, and they start with the operators identifier which currently are 91, 923 and 93.

== Calling formats ==
- xxx xxx xxx Calls within Angola
- +244 xxx xxx xxx Calls from outside Angola

The NSN length is nine digits.

== List of area codes in Angola ==
LIST OF AREA CODES
| Area Code | Area/City |
|---|---|
| 2 | Luanda |
| 31 | Cabinda |
| 32 | Zaire |
| 321 | Soyo |
| 33 | Uíge |
| 34 | Bengo |
| 348 | Caxito |
| 35 | Kuanza Norte |
| 358 | N'Dalatando |
| 36 | Kuanza Sul |
| 363 | Sumbe |
| 364 | Porto Amboim |
| 41 | Huambo |
| 48 | Bie |
| 485 | Kuíto |
| 49 | Kuando Kubango |
| 51 | Malange |
| 526 | Dundo |
| 53 | Lunda Sul |
| 535 | Saurimo |
| 54 | Moxico |
| 546 | Luena |
| 61 | Huíla |
| 612 | Lubango |
| 64 | Moçâmedes |
| 643 | Tombua |
| 65 | Cunene |
| 652 | St. Clara/Cunene |
| 655 | Ondjiva |
| 72 | Benguela |
| 722 | Lobito |
| 726 | Bela Vista |
| 728 | Baía Farta |
| 729 | Catumbela |
| 777 | Dama Universal |
