= Telephone numbers in Togo =

- Togo (dark blue)
- Country: Togo
- Continent: Africa
- NSN length: 8
- Format: XX XX XX XX
- Country code: +228
- International access: 00
- Long-distance: n/a

The following are the telephone codes in Togo.

== Calling formats ==
- yyy xxxxx - Calling inside Togo
- +228 yyy xxxxx - Calling from outside Togo

The NSN length is eight digits.

== List of area codes in Togo ==
LIST OF AREA CODES
Area Code	Area
22 xx xx xx	Lome
23 xx xx xx	Maritime region
24 xx xx xx	Plateaux region
25 xx xx xx	Central region
26 xx xx xx	Kara region
27 xx xx xx	Savannah region
7x xx xx xx	Mobile telephones
9x xx xx xx	Mobile telephones

All numbers in Togo have 8 digits. The emergency number is 112.

== Mobile codes ==
Togo has two mobile operators: Togocel and Moov. Mobile numbers in Togo start with 7x or 9x and have 8 digits. X indicates the operator code: The codes for togocel are 70, 71, 72, 73, 90, 91, 92 and 93, and Moov has codes 78, 79, 96, 97, 98 and 99. There are no numbers starting with 74, 75, 76 and 77 codes.
