= Telephone numbers in Andorra =

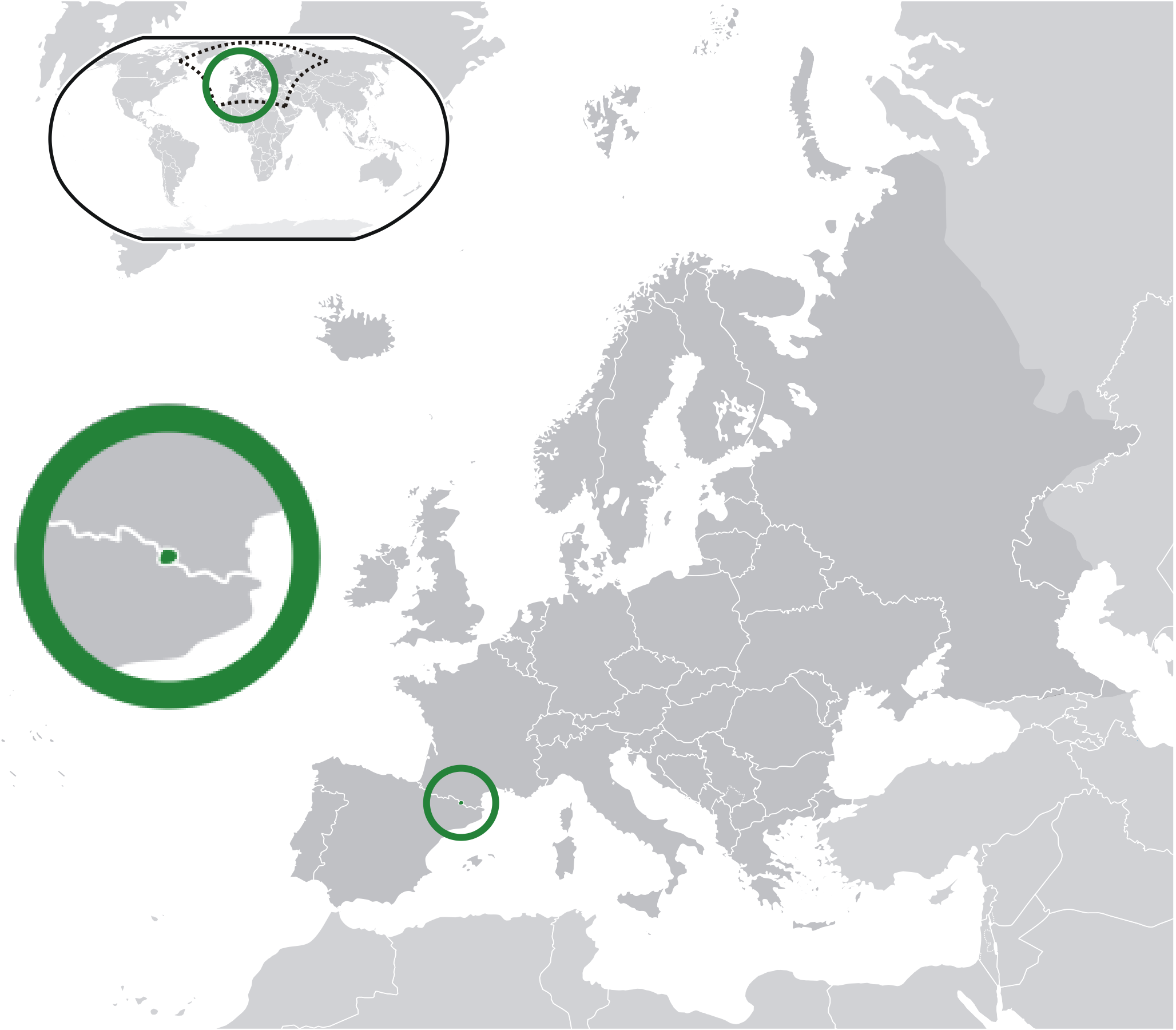
- Location of Andorra
- Country: Andorra
- Continent: Europe
- NSN length: 6
- Country code: +376
- International access: 00
- Long-distance: none

Telephone numbers in Andorra are six digits, with fixed line numbers beginning with the digits 8 and 7 and mobile telephone numbers with the digits 3 and 6. Toll-free numbers are eight digits, beginning with 1800 (if they are accessible only within Andorra) or 1802 (if they also can be reached internationally). Three-digit numbers starting with 1 are reserved and six-digit numbers starting with 9 are reserved for special services, and nine-digit number starting with 690 are assigned to special mobile services such as machine to machine communications.

Until 1994, Andorra formed part of the French numbering plan, with the prefix 628 being used for calls from France (or 16 628 from Paris) while +33 628 was used from the rest of the world. Access was also possible via the Spanish numbering plan using the area code 9738, or the international prefix +34 738. On 17 December 1994, Andorra adopted its own country code, +376. This meant that all international calls to the Principality, including those from France and Spain, required the use of the +376 country code.
