= Telephone numbers in Sierra Leone =

- Country: Sierra Leone
- Continent: Africa
- Country code: +232
- International access: 00
- Long-distance: 0

The following are the telephone codes in Sierra Leone.

== Calling formats ==
To call in Sierra Leone, the following format is used:

- xxxxxx - Calls within an area code
- 0yy xxxxxx - Calls within Sierra Leone
- +232 yy xxxxxx - Calls from outside Sierra Leone

The NSN length is eight digits.

== List of area codes in Sierra Leone ==
LIST OF FIXED AREA CODES
| Area/City | Area Code | Operator | Exchange code | Subscriber number |
|---|---|---|---|---|
| Bo/Kenema | 32 | Sierratel | 2N – 4N | XXXX |
| Freetown | 22 | Sierratel | 2N – 4N | XXXX |
| Makeni/Koidu | 52 | Sierratel | 2N – 4N | XXXX |

LIST OF MOBILE CODES
| Network | Area code National Destination Code NDC | Subscriber number |
|---|---|---|
| Airtel (SL) Ltd | 76 | YXX XXX |
| Airtel (SL) Ltd | 78 | YXX XXX |
| Airtel (SL) Ltd | 79 | YXX XXX |
| Africell (SL) Ltd | 30 | YXX XXX |
| Comium (SL) Ltd | 33 | YXX XXX |
| Comium (SL) Ltd | 34 | YXX XXX |
| IPTEL (SL) Ltd | 35 | YXX XXX |
| Onlime (SL) Ltd | 66 | YXX XXX |
| Orange (SL) Ltd | 72-76, 78-79 | YXX XXX |
| Africell (SL) Ltd | 77 | YXX XXX |
| Africell (SL) Ltd | 88 | YXX XXX |
| Datatel/Cellcom (GSM) | 40 | YXX XXX |
| Datatel/Cellcom (CDMA) | 50 | YXX XXX |
| AFCOM | 55 | YXX XXX |
| Sierratel (CDMA) | 25 | YXX XXX |
| Sierratel | 21 | YXX XXX |
| Intergroup | 44 | YXX XXX |

Note: X = 0 – 9; Y = 1 – 9; N = 2 – 9

== See also ==
- Telecommunications in Sierra Leone
