= Telephone numbers in Rwanda =

- Country: Rwanda
- Continent: Africa
- Country code: +250
- International access: 00
- Long-distance: none

The following are the telephone codes in Rwanda.

== Telephone numbering plan ==
The Rwanda Utilities Regulatory Agency introduced a new telephone numbering plan in February 2009.

To call within Rwanda, the following format is now used:

- 250 5.. ... Land-line Calls (formerly 5.. ...)
- 255 5.. ... Land-line Calls (formerly 5..)
- 783 ... ... Mobile Calls (formerly 03 ... ...)
- 788 ... ... Mobile Calls (formerly 08 ... ...)
- 75. ... ... Mobile Calls (CDMA)

== List of allocations in Rwanda ==
LIST OF ALLOCATIONS IN 2009, WITH UPDATES
NDC (National Destination Code) or leading digits of NSN (National Significant Number NSN	Number length	Usage of E.164 Number	Additional Information
25	9	Geographic, fixed	Liquid Telecommunications Rwanda
72	9	Non-geographic, mobile	Airtel Rwanda (formerly Tigo)
73	9	Non-geographic, mobile	Airtel Rwanda
78	9	Non-geographic, mobile	MTN Rwanda
06	8	Non-geographic, satellite	Rwanda Satellite The leading zero must be dialled from abroad.
