= Telephone numbers in the Central African Republic =

Telephone numbers in Central African Republic
- Country: Central African Republic
- Continent: Africa
- Country code: +236
- International access: 00
- Long-distance: n/a

The following are the telephone codes in the Central African Republic.

== Current calling formats ==
- +236 XXXX XXXX - from outside the Central African Republic
- XXXX XXXX - from inside the Central African Republic

The NSN length is eight digits.

== List of number ranges in the Central African Republic ==
LIST OF FIXED LINE ALLOCATIONS
Number Range	Service operator	Area
21XX XXXX	Socatel	Bangui area
22XX XXXX	Socatel	Berberati area

LIST OF MOBILE ALLOCATIONS
Number Range	Service operator
70XX XXXX	Acell RCA
75XX XXXX	Telecel
77XX XXXX	Nationlink
72XX XXXX	Orange

LIST OF SPECIAL SERVICE ALLOCATIONS
Number Range	Service operator
8776 XXXX	Invivent

== Changes as of 1 November 2007 ==
The Agence chargée de la Régulation des Télécommunications (ART), Bangui, announces the introduction of new resources in the National Numbering Plan (NNP) of the Central African Republic.

The new eight-digit will become effective on Thursday, 1 November 2007, at 0500 hours UTC.

The National Numbering Plan (NNP) will change from six (6) to eight (8) digits in accordance with ITU-T E.164 Recommendation.

• Mobile telephone service

Operator	Old numbers	New numbers	Examples
Acell RCA	01 XX XX 02 XX XX 40 XX XX 45 XX XX 46 XX XX 80 XX XX 85 XX XX 90 XX XX 95 XX XX 96 XX XX 97 XX XX 98 XX XX 99 XX XX	70 XX XX XX	01 00 00 becomes 70 01 00 00 02 00 00 becomes 70 02 00 00 40 00 00 becomes 70 40 00 00 45 00 00 becomes 70 45 00 00 46 00 00 becomes 70 46 00 00 80 00 00 becomes 70 80 00 00 85 00 00 becomes 70 85 00 00 90 00 00 becomes 70 90 00 00 95 00 00 becomes 70 95 00 00 96 00 00 becomes 70 96 00 00 97 00 00 becomes 70 97 00 00 98 00 00 becomes 70 98 00 00 99 00 00 becomes 70 99 00 00
Telecel	03 XX XX 04 XX XX 05 XX XX 20 XX XX 50 XX XX 54 XX XX 55 XX XX 56 XX XX 57 XX XX 58 XX XX	75 XX XX XX	03 00 00 becomes 75 03 00 00 04 00 00 becomes 75 04 00 00 05 00 00 becomes 75 05 00 00 20 00 00 becomes 75 20 00 00 50 00 00 becomes 75 50 00 00 54 00 00 becomes 75 54 00 00 55 00 00 becomes 75 55 00 00 56 00 00 becomes 75 56 00 00 57 00 00 becomes 75 57 00 00 58 00 00 becomes 75 58 00 00
Nationlink	06 00 00 08 00 00 09 00 00 44 00 00 48 00 00 49 00 00 59 00 00 88 00 00 89 00 00	77 XX XX XX	06 00 00 becomes 77 06 00 00 08 00 00 becomes 77 08 00 00 09 00 00 becomes 77 09 00 00 44 00 00 becomes 77 44 00 00 48 00 00 becomes 77 48 00 00 49 00 00 becomes 77 49 00 00 59 00 00 becomes 77 59 00 00 88 00 00 becomes 77 88 00 00 89 00 00 becomes 77 89 00 00
Orange		72 XX XX XX	72 XX XX XX
Socatel	61 XX XX 62 XX XX 65 XX XX	21 XX XX XX	61 00 00 becomes 21 61 00 00 62 00 00 becomes 21 62 00 00 65 00 00 becomes 21 65 00 00
Socatel	21 XX XX 31 XX XX 41 XX XX 51 XX XX 81 XX XX 91 XX XX	22 XX XX XX	21 00 00 becomes 22 21 00 00 31 00 00 becomes 22 31 00 00 41 00 00 becomes 22 41 00 00 51 00 00 becomes 22 51 00 00 81 00 00 becomes 22 81 00 00 91 00 00 becomes 22 91 00 00

• Fixed telephone service

Operator	Old numbers	New numbers	Examples
Socatel Bangui	61 XX XX 62 XX XX 65 XX XX	21 XX XX XX	61 00 00 becomes 21 61 00 00 62 00 00 becomes 21 62 00 00 65 00 00 becomes 21 65 00 00
Socatel Berberati	21 XX XX 31 XX XX 41 XX XX 51 XX XX 81 XX XX 91 XX XX	22 XX XX XX	21 00 00 becomes 22 21 00 00 31 00 00 becomes 22 31 00 00 41 00 00 becomes 22 41 00 00 51 00 00 becomes 22 51 00 00 81 00 00 becomes 22 81 00 00 91 00 00 becomes 22 91 00 00
INVIVENT		87 76 XX XX	Value-added service
