= Telephone numbers in the British Indian Ocean Territory =

Country Code: 246

International Call Prefix: 00

National Significant Numbers (NSN): seven digits

The group of islands forming the British Indian Ocean Territory does not use area codes.

This region includes the Chagos Archipelago, the main island of which is Diego Garcia.

== Allocations ==
ALLOCATIONS
Service	Number Range
Fixed	+246 37X XXXX
Mobile	+246 38X XXXX

== See also ==
- Telephone numbers in the United Kingdom
