= Telephone numbers in Sudan =

- Country: Sudan
- Continent: Africa
- Country code: +249
- International access: 00
- Long-distance: 0

The following are the telephone codes in Sudan.

== Calling formats ==
To call in Sudan, the following format is used:

- 0tp axx xxxx - calls within Sudan
- +249 tp axx xxxx - calls from outside Sudan

where

- t is the Service Type Identifier (1 for fixed lines, 9 for mobile),
- p is the Service Provider Identifier, and
- a is the Area Code.

For fixed lines: a is 3: Khartoum; 5: Khartoum North; 6: Khartoum Rural; 7: Omdurman

== Company codes ==
Allocations in Sudan
Service type	Company	Prefix
Fixed line	Sudani	10, 11, 12
Fixed line	Canar	15
Fixed line	Sudatel	18
Mobile line	MTN Sudan	92, 93, 99
Mobile line	Network of the World Ltd (NOW)	95
Mobile line	Zain Sudan	90, 91, 96

* 18 is mentioned within the contact number, but not in the table. It is possible that code 18 became 12 at some point, though there is speculation that 12 is simply a new number range.
