= Telephone numbers in Djibouti =

- Country: Djibouti
- Continent: Africa
- Country code: +253
- International access: 00
- Long-distance: none

The following are the telephone codes in Djibouti.

== Calling formats ==
- 21 XX XX XX - fixed line Djibouti City, Balbala
- 27 XX XX XX - fixed line other regions
- 77 (1, 2, 3, 4, 5, 6, 7 or 8)X XX XX - Djibouti Telecom mobile phones
- +253 - country code for calling to Djibouti
- 00 + country code + international number - calling internationally from Djibouti

The NSN length is eight digits. Digits 1 & 2 define service type, digits 3 & 4 are fixed line locality.

== List of allocations in Djibouti ==
A new number plan took effect 1 November 2010.

LIST OF FIXED ALLOCATIONS
Service	Operator	Number series
CDMA fixed	Djibouti Telecom	5X XX XX
Fixed	Djibouti Telecom	10 XXXX (new)
Fixed	Djibouti Telecom	15 XXXX (new)
Fixed	Djibouti Telecom	2X XXXX (new)
Fixed	Djibouti Telecom	3X XXXX (new)
Fixed	Djibouti Telecom	4X XXXX (new)

LIST OF MOBILE ALLOCATIONS
Service	Operator	Number series
Mobile GSM	Djibouti Telecom	6X XXXX
Mobile GSM	Djibouti Telecom	7X XXXX
Mobile GSM	Djibouti Telecom	8X XXXX
