= Telephone numbers in the Gambia =

Telephone numbers in Gambia
- Country: Gambia
- Continent: Africa
- NSN length: 7
- Format: yyy xxxx
- Country code: 220
- International access: 00

The following are the telephone codes in The Gambia.

== Calling formats ==
To call in the Gambia, the following format is used:

- yyy xxxx - Calls within the Gambia
- yyy xx xx - (Uncommon) Calls within the Gambia
- 220 yyy xxxx - Calls from outside the Gambia

The NSN length is seven digits.

== List of area codes in the Gambia ==
LIST OF FIXED ALLOCATIONS
| Location | Number range | Operator |
|---|---|---|
| Baja Kunda | 566 XXXX | GAMTEL |
| Bakau | 449 XXXX | GAMTEL |
| Banjul | 42X XXXX | GAMTEL |
| Bansang | 567 4XXX | GAMTEL |
| Barra | 571 0XXX | GAMTEL |
| Basse | 566 XXXX | GAMTEL |
| Berending | 441 95XX | GAMTEL |
| Bondali | 448 0XXX | GAMTEL |
| Brikama | 448 XXXX | GAMTEL |
| Brikama-Ba | 567 8XXX | GAMTEL |
| Brufut | 441 0XXX | GAMTEL |
| Bundung | 43X XXXX | GAMTEL |
| Bureng | 554 4XXX | GAMTEL |
| Bwiam | 448 9XXX | GAMTEL |
| Faraba | 448 7XXX | GAMTEL |
| Farafenni | 573 5XXX | GAMTEL |
| Fatoto | 566 XXXX | GAMTEL |
| Gambisara | 566 XXXX | GAMTEL |
| Georgetown | 567 6XXX | GAMTEL |
| Garawol | 566 XXXX | GAMTEL |
| Gunjur | 448 6XXX | GAMTEL |
| Iliasa | 572 5XXX | GAMTEL |
| Japeneh | 554 3XXX | GAMTEL |
| Jareng | 554 7XXX | GAMTEL |
| Kafuta | 448 5XXX | GAMTEL |
| Kaiaf | 554 0XXX | GAMTEL |
| Kanilia | 448 XXXX | GAMTEL |
| Kartong | 4419XXX | GAMTEL |
| Kaur | 574 8XXX | GAMTEL |
| Kerewan | 572 0XXX | GAMTEL |
| Kotu | 446 XXXX | GAMTEL |
| Kudang | 554 6XXX | GAMTEL |
| Kuntaur | 566 5XXX | GAMTEL |
| Kwenella | 554 1XXX | GAMTEL |
| Misera | 566 XXXX | GAMTEL |
| Ndugukebbe | 571 4XXX | GAMTEL |
| Ngensanjal | 573 8XXX | GAMTEL |
| Njabakunda | 572 3XXX | GAMTEL |
| Numeyel | 566 6XXX | GAMTEL |
| Nyorojattaba | 554 2XXX | GAMTEL |
| Pakaliba | 554 5XXX | GAMTEL |
| Sambakunda | 566 XXXX | GAMTEL |
| Sanyang | 441 7XXX | GAMTEL |
| Senegambia | 446 XXXX | GAMTEL |
| Serekunda | 43X XXXX | GAMTEL |
| Sibanor | 448 8XXX | GAMTEL |
| Soma | 554 3XXX | GAMTEL |
| Sotuma | 567 XXXX | GAMTEL |
| Sudowol | 566 XXXX | GAMTEL |
| Tanji | 441 2XXX | GAMTEL |
| Tower System | 441 4XXX | GAMTEL |
| Tujereng | 441 6XXX | GAMTEL |
| Yundum | 447 XXXX | GAMTEL |

LIST OF CDMA and VoIP ALLOCATIONS
| Number range | Operator |
|---|---|
| 8XX XXXX | GAMTEL |

LIST OF MOBILE ALLOCATIONS
| Number range | Operator |
|---|---|
| 2XX XXXX | AFRICELL |
| 7XX XXXX | AFRICELL |
| 40X XXXX | AFRICELL |
| 41X XXXX | AFRICELL |
| 3XX XXXX | QCELL |
| 50X XXXX | QCELL |
| 51X XXXX | QCELL |
| 52X XXXX | QCELL |
| 53X XXXX | QCELL |
| 58X XXXX | QCELL |
| 59X XXXX | QCELL |
| 6XX XXXX | COMIUM |
| 9XX XXXX | GAMCEL |

== Old allocations ==
LIST OF OLD AREA CODES
| Area/City | Area Code |
|---|---|
| Bakau | 449 |
| Banjul | 42 |
| Kotu | 446 |
| Sanyang | 441 |
| Serekunda | 43 |
| Yundum | 447 |
