= Premium-rate telephone number =

Telephone numbers for calls that are charged at a higher than normal rate

Premium-rate telephone numbers are telephone numbers that charge callers higher price rates for select services, including information and entertainment. A portion of the call fees is paid to the service provider, allowing premium calls to be an additional source of revenue for businesses. Tech support, psychic hotlines, and adult chat lines (e.g. dating and phone sex) are among the most popular kinds of premium-rate phone services. Other services include directory enquiries, weather forecasts, competitions and ratings televoting (especially relating to television shows). Some businesses, e.g. low-cost airlines, and diplomatic missions, such as the US Embassy in London or the UK Embassy in Washington, have also used premium-rate phone numbers for calls from the general public.

Premium calls are typically independent of the caller's area code. These telephone numbers are usually allocated based on a national telephone numbering plan that makes them easily distinguishable from non-premium numbers; telephone companies often offer their customers the option to block calls from these number ranges, and in some jurisdictions, are required by law to offer blocking services.

SMS (texting) also has a feature for premium rate services, however instead of standard telephone numbers, premium-rate texting uses so-called shortcodes, which are 4–6 digit numbers that work only for SMS.

== Africa ==
=== Egypt ===
In Egypt, premium rate numbers begin with the prefix 0900, and for mobile services it uses short numbers to call or to send SMS to (4 digits only).

=== South Africa ===
In South Africa, premium rate SMS short codes are four or five digits long, starting with either '3' or '4'. Premium rate telephone services are regulated by The Independent Communications Authority of South Africa (ICASA) and ranges from 0862 through 0869(increasing rates relating to the next digit after 086).

== Asia ==
=== Armenia ===
In Armenia, premium numbers start with 900, followed by six digits.

=== Indonesia ===
In Indonesia, premium numbers begin with 0809 and are marketed by Telkom as Japati, an acronym for Jaringan Pintar Nasional (National Smart Network). Due to the number's association with adult services (Telkom's dial-up Internet service, Telkomnet Instan at 080989999 being a major exception) premium-rate phone services have come under public scrutiny and regulatory crackdown, most notably in May 2015 following rash of spam text messages enticing mobile phone users to dial them.

=== Japan ===
In Japan, premium rate telephone number service was currently known as "Navi-dial" and began with the prefix 0570 followed by six digits. The "DIAL Q^{2}" service that's number had the prefix 0990 was ended operations in early 2013.

=== South Korea ===
In South Korea, premium rate numbers start with the prefix 060 followed by 7 or 8 digits. Some consumers do not know that numbers starting with 060 are premium rate numbers because 060 is mistaken for one of long-distance area codes in Korea (there are 062, 061 and 063). They call back when they find that they miss a call to their mobile phones from a 060 number ending up paying for just making a call.

1588-#### and 1577-#### are not premium rate numbers per se. They are used by banks, insurance companies, nationwide restaurant chains, consumer electronics companies, online shopping malls and others for customer service and delivery order. In many cases, customers calling them are charged at a long-distance rate without knowing that they are making a long-distance call.

=== Vietnam ===
In Vietnam, premium rate numbers start with 1900; premium rate SMS have 4 digits starting with 4,5,6,7,8 and the 2nd digit decides the price (except 1400 - 1409 with variable prices from 3000-18000 VND per sms, reserved for charity and 156, 5656, 1414 which are free).

=== Taiwan ===
In Taiwan, premium rate numbers start with 0203, 0204 and 0209.

=== Mongolia ===
In Mongolia, premium rate numbers start with 1900.

== Europe ==
In many European countries, such as France, Germany and the United Kingdom, it was common for organisations to operate customer service lines on premium-rate numbers using prefixes that fall outside the scope of the country's premium-rate number regulations. Therefore, in contrast to North America where customer service numbers are typically free of charge to the caller, consumers in Europe often used to pay a premium above the cost of a normal telephone call. The EU Consumer Rights Directive 2011/EU/83, which came into force on 13 June 2014, was intended to eliminate this pricing model, but the law's implementation and success varies widely from country to country.

BEREC (Body of European Regulators for Electronic Communications) maintains a detailed list of premium telephone number prefixes used within EU member states and territories.

=== Austria ===
In Austria, the 0900 prefix is used for premium rate numbers that charge per minute and the 0901 prefix is used for premium rate numbers that charge by call. For adult content the prefix is 0930 for per minute tariffs and 0931 for event based tariffs.

=== Belgium ===
In Belgium, premium rate numbers in Belgium have the area codes 090x.

- 0900, 0902, 0903, 0904 (per minute – from 0.25 to 2.00 EUR)
- 0906, 0907 (adult services – per minute – from 0.25 to 2.00 EUR)
- 0905, 0909 (per call – from 0.25 to 31.00 EUR)

Call limited to 10 mins.

=== Croatia ===
In Croatia, the 060 prefix is used for premium rate numbers for non-erotic and 064 prefix is used for erotic services.

=== Czech Republic ===
In the Czech Republic, numbers starting with 900, 906, 909 and 976 are premium rate numbers. Other numbers beginning with "9" are allocated to certain organizations, such as 972 (Czech railways), 973 (Ministry of Defense), 974 (Ministry of Interior), 95x (other Ministries, government organizations, certain commercial subjects), 910 (VoIP nongeographic nomadic numbers).

=== Denmark ===
In Denmark, premium rate numbers have the area codes 9013, 9050 and 9055/9056. The 9013 is for helplines and chat services, the 9050 (paid per call) is for TV Call-in Shows and the 9055/9056 codes are for charitable organizations.

However, the regulation is very strict. TDC Holding A/S is the only carrier offering these numbers, with MCXess and kwak Telecom offering numbers internationally. The regulator offers a shortened English regulation.

=== Finland ===
In Finland, numbers starting with 0100, 0200, 0202, 0209, 0300, 0600, 0700, 0750, 0751, 0752, 0753, 0757, 0759, 100, 106 and 107 are premium rate numbers. The 0700 series is for entertainment, while 0600 is for services. Several other premium codes exist, sometimes confusing consumers, who may not know if they are calling a premium number or not.

The Finnish Consumers' Association has repeatedly denounced the use of premium rate numbers.

=== France ===
In France, numbers starting with 08xx (International : +33 8(...)) are special rate numbers. They range from toll free numbers (080x) to premium numbers (08Rx) (R from 1 to 9) (called Audiotel by France Telecom). There are also various moderately priced numbers (from about 0.03 to 0.15 €/minute) in the 081x and 082x ranges. Most of these numbers are not reachable from outside France.

There are also special 4 digits numbers (national speed dial) in the form of 3xxx, for which billing rules can be the ones from any 08xx number, to the provider's choice.

The split rule between different premium rate numbers is not clearly defined (premium rate information numbers and premium rate entertainment numbers).

The regulator (ARCEP, previously ART) had issued a range for Telephony over xDSL in the 087x range, which might confuse consumers, as calls to these numbers are billed as local calls nationwide. Starting 20 December 2005, these have been changed to 09xx numbers, which are dedicated to VoIP. All 087x numbers have been converted to 09xx numbers by 15 December 2008.

=== Germany ===
In Germany, Dedicated premium-rate lines nowadays begin with the prefix 0900, the infamous 0190 prefix having been terminated on December 31, 2005. However, some premium services also use lines with the prefix 0137, which is supposedly reserved for planned simultaneous call-in events, such as televoting.

The digit after 0900 decides the kind of service offered, unlike 0190, where it determined the pricing. This is called offline billing and causes problems for coin telephones (where they are restricted entirely) or prepaid services. These are -1 for information, -3 for entertainment and -5 for "miscellaneous" (mostly adult entertainment). 0900-9 is reserved for dialers, which are heavily regulated, or to do payments by phone.

=== Greece ===
In Greece, Premium numbers start with 901 (general purpose) and 909 (adult-only services), followed by seven digits.

=== Hungary ===
In Hungary, 06-90 and 06-91 followed by six digits are common premium-rate numbers. SMS-based services can also use short numbers such as 1781 and 17632.

=== Ireland ===
In Ireland, premium rate numbers begin with the prefix 15. These numbers provide a range of services from weather forecasting to adult dating. Adult type services shall only be provided using the access codes 1598 or 1599, with adult services of a sexual nature being restricted to the latter. Adult authentication is required from your network operator to access these numbers.

All 15x numbers have officially quoted rates, set by the prefix, although telecom providers can charge an additional fee for carrying the call. 151x numbers are charged on a per-call basis, all others on a per-minute basis. In general the prices increase as the prefix number increases, within the call type range.

Comreg is a body which monitors the premium rate services industry in Ireland. Although an independent body, it can impose sanctions, ban advertisements and ban services offered by providers. It is funded by a levy on providers.

=== Italy ===
In Italy, There are many premium rate numbers, including anything starting with 89 using different fares. 0878 is also a premium-rate number, reserved for polls run via telephone.

=== Latvia ===
In Latvia, premium numbers are with prefix (+371) 90

=== Netherlands ===
In the Netherlands, premium numbers start with 0900 (general purpose), 0906 (erotic entertainment) and 0909 (games and lotteries) followed by four or seven digits. When one dials such a nulnegenhonderdnummer it is enforced by law that the caller gets informed about the per minute rate. The Opta is the governing body that regulates premium rate services in the Netherlands. Starting June 2014 any 0900 number used for customer service purposes is regulated so that it is free to the caller, for if they buy the product, they also buy the right to contact consumer service.

=== North Macedonia ===
In North Macedonia, premium-rate telephone numbers range from 0500-0599 (most common prefixes used for these telephone numbers are 500 and 550. The following format for dialing a premium telephone number in North Macedonia: +389 5xx x xx xx).

=== Norway ===
In Norway, any telephone number starting with 82 (mostly 820/829) is charged at premium rates (82x xx xxx).

=== Portugal ===
- 607 - Pull opinion, 9 tariffs up to 3.28 Eur per minute (premium rates)
- 707 – Entertainment and some business (€0.25 + VAT / minute)
- 760 - Fixed tariff for all calls (€0.60 + VAT per call)
- 761 - Entertainment (€1 + VAT per call)
- 808 – Business and marketing (cost of a local land-line call)

In Portugal, the VAT for calls is 23%, except in Madeira, where it is 22%, and in Azores, where it is 18%.

=== Poland ===
In Poland, numbers starting with 70, 30 and 40 are reserved for premium-rate services. 700, 701, 707 and 300 are "general" premium-rate services (usually charged per minute), 707 and 400 are assigned for tele-voting, mass-calls and so on (usually charged per call). Other numbers (702-706, 709, 301–309, 401-409) are reserved for future assignments. There are some other numbers in "shared costs" or "dial-up services" ranges, which are charged at a quite high rates (comparable with lower cost premium rates): 8015, 8016, 207, 208.

Effective on December 1, 2008, 300 and 400 numbers are changed into 703 and 704 respectively, freeing up the whole 30x and 40x range for the future assignments (non-premium rate). This change will allow to accumulate all the premium rate services in the 700-709 range of numbers.

Under the Electronic Communications Law in force since 10 November 2024, a premium-rate service may be provided only after entry in a register kept by the President of the Office of Electronic Communications (UKE) and must be notified at least 14 days before launch. Subscribers can set a spending limit per billing period of PLN 0, 35, 100 or 200, with PLN 35 as the default, and must be told the price before charging begins; a provider that breaches these rules may lose the right to demand payment.

=== Romania ===
In Romania, premium numbers are in the 090xxxxxx-098xxxxxx range. Currently, only the 0900 block is used. Prior to 2002, all numbers starting with 89 were premium rate numbers. Some of those number remain as local premium numbers, and the 02xx89xxxxx block remains reserved.

=== Russia ===
In Russia, 809 and 803 (paid per call, less generally used) are premium prefix. Note that usually in Russia one needs to dial 8 or +7 before the area code, so premium numbers are usually written as 8-(803/809)-xxx-xxxx or +7-(803/809)-xxx-xxxx.

=== Slovakia ===
In Slovakia, the 0900 prefix is used for premium rate numbers.

=== Slovenia ===
In Slovenia, The 090 prefix is used for premium rate numbers.

=== Spain ===
In Spain, the charged-at-premium numbers begins with 80 or 90 (except the 800, 900 and 909, which are free, the 901 which is shared cost, the 902 which is like a provincial call and the 908 which is like a metropolitan call). The most popular prefixes are 803 (porn hot-lines) and 806 (services), also are used 807 and 905. Previously all the numbers starting with 90x (except 900, 901 and 902) were charged at premium rates but the 906 had been moved to 803, 806 and 807 and the 908 and 909 prefixes were created for Internet dialup services. All those numbers have 9 digits. In Spain both pay per minute and pay per call billing options are available across the 8 and 9 series range of numbers.

Also there are other range for information services (weather, white pages, etc...), there are all the numbers starting with 118, they can have 5 or 6 digits with a variable cost per number. 11818 is free from Telefónica's telephone cabins. Previously 11818 was 1003.

=== Sweden ===
In Sweden, numbers starting with 0900, 0939 and 0944 are premium rate numbers. Also numbers beginning on 118 are premium rate numbers for companies that provide phonebook lookup services.

=== Switzerland ===
In Switzerland, numbers starting with 0900, 0901 and 0906 are premium rate numbers.

- 0900 – Business & Marketing
- 0901 – Entertainment
- 0906 – Erotic services

Dialers (computer programs) are banned from these lines.

These are regulated by the Bundesamt für Kommunikation.

=== Ukraine ===
In Ukraine, numbers starting with 0703 and 0900 are premium rate numbers.

=== United Kingdom ===
==== Service numbers ====
In the United Kingdom, premium rate numbers starting 084, 087, 090, 091, 098 or 118 are officially designated as service numbers. These have a two-part call charge, following regulatory reform in July 2015. The cost of calling such numbers is always a total of the following elements:

- An 'Access Charge' which is set by the caller's own telephone company, and is set at the same rate for all service numbers. This rate varies considerably by telephone company, from 2p to 27p per minute from landlines or 4p to 95p per minute from mobile phones.
- A 'Service Charge' which is set by and benefits the organisation being called and/or its telecoms supplier. For any particular number, the same premium charge rate applies from all consumer landlines and mobile phones, with the organisation in question being responsible for informing callers of the applicable rate everywhere the number is displayed.

Service numbers fall into the following ranges:

- 084x xxx xxxx - Service Charge of up to 7p per call and/or up to 7p per minute
- 087x xxx xxxx - Service Charge of up to 13p per call and/or up to 13p per minute
- 09xx xxx xxxx - Service Charge of up to £6.00 per call and/or up to £3.60 per minute
- 118 xxx - Service Charge of up to £3.65 per call and/or up to £2.43 per minute, with an overall cap of £3.65 per 90 seconds of a call.

Numbers starting 098, along with legacy numbers starting 0908 and 0909 are reserved for 'adult' services with sexual content. Numbers starting 118 are reserved for directory enquiries services.

==== Mobile voice and text shortcodes ====
Various services can also be accessed via five-, six-, or seven-digit mobile voice and text shortcodes beginning with a 6, 7, or 8. Calls to these numbers may be free, or charged on either a per-call basis or at a per-minute rate. The same charge will apply irrespective of which UK mobile provider is used to make the call, and the service provider must state the charge wherever the number is advertised or promoted. Text messages sent to mobile shortcodes may be free, or charged per message sent. The charge may be a fixed rate, or may be a premium rate (such as when donating to charity or entering a competition) plus "one standard rate text message charge". Receiving text messages from mobile shortcodes may be free or charged per message, and some services may incur an automatic recurring charge on a daily, weekly, monthly or other basis. The service provider must state these charges in advance.

Numbers starting 69 and 89 are reserved for 'adult' services with sexual content, numbers starting 70 are reserved for charity donations, and numbers starting 72 are reserved for society lotteries.

==== Controlled Premium Rate Services ====
A subset of service numbers, a subset of mobile short codes, some other numbers charged above a specific price threshold, along with several specific types of service, are defined as Controlled Premium Rate Services (CPRS) in Ofcom's PRS Condition. These are subject to additional regulation detailed in the Regulation of Premium Rate Services Order 2024. These include:

- 087, 09 and 118 numbers with a Service Charge of 7p per call or per minute, or more
- mobile shortcodes and any other numbers where the benefit passed on is 10p per call or per minute, or more
- all sexual entertainment services, all chatlines, and all information, connection and/or signposting services (ICSS) irrespective of call cost or prefix.
- numbers starting 070 were also regulated as CPRS until Ofcom lowered the termination rate for this number range on 1 October 2019
- all internet dialler-operated services irrespective of call cost or prefix were also regulated as CPRS until Ofcom ended this regulation on 1 February 2025.

==== Regulator ====
Day to day regulation of premium rate services passed from the Phone-paid Services Authority (PSA) back to Ofcom from 1 February 2025.

==== History of prefixes ====
The various 08 and 09 ranges originate from telephone numbering reform in the late 1990s. This was when 09 numbers were designated as premium rate, with 0845 and 0870 numbers charged from BT landlines at rates that mirrored the cost of standard local and national phone calls respectively. Later, revenue share numbers starting 0844, 0871, 0843 and 0872 also came into use. Prior to all of this, when numbers were one digit shorter than they are today, a wide mix of prefixes were in use, from the well-recognized 0891 and 0898 prefixes to others such as 0331, 0345, 03745, 0541, 0645 and 0990.

== Middle East ==
=== Iran ===
In Iran, premium rate numbers start with the prefix 909 followed by 7 digits. (909 xxx xxxx). Can only be reached via landline, 7020 and 7070xxxx can be used by anything.

=== Israel ===
In Israel, Numbers starting with 1–900, 1–901, 1–919, 1-956 and 1-957 are premium rate numbers.

- 1-900 – Regular landline call rate + 50 Agorot (0.5 Shekel) (≈$0.14) per minute
- 1-901 – Regular landline call rate + 250 Agorot (2.5 Shekels) (≈$0.7) per call
- 1-919 – Erotic services
- 1-956 – Entertainment services: up to 40 Agorot more than a regular landline rate + destination service provider fee
- 1-957 – Information services: regular landline rate + destination service provider fee

The prefix 1-900 belongs to services with cost addition of 0.5 NIS for minute. Usually, used in radio stations and dates services. the next two digits tells the company: 2X for Bezeq, 50 for Pelephone, 52 for Cellcom (052-999XXXX in the origin), 54 for Partner (054-400XXXX in the origin) and 72 for Smile.

More optional premium call prefix:

- 012-409 or 018-XXX: Are used by Smile and Xphone. Cost 9.90 NIS for minute, usually for mysticism services.
- 013-44: Is used by Netvision. Costs 6 NIS for minute, usually for TV game.

=== Lebanon ===
In Lebanon, some four digit numbers are premium rate numbers. These numbers can only be reached with a mobile phone and are mainly used for contests and sweepstakes.

=== Saudi Arabia ===
In Saudi Arabia, these numbers start with 700. They are mostly for competitions and winning prizes—adult entertainment ventures are considered immodest and thus illegal in Saudi Arabia.

== North America ==
=== Canada, United States, and other NANP countries ===
In the North American Numbering Plan (NANP), area code 900 is reserved for premium rate telephone services, which are also known as 900 numbers (one-nine-hundred). The full dialing specification is 1-900-XXX-XXXX.

=== Mexico ===
In Mexico, premium rate numbers are served by Telmex and start with the dialing prefix 01-900, where 01 is the domestic long-distance prefix and 900 is the premium-rate area code. These numbers are usually used for the same purposes as in the United States.

== Oceania ==
=== Australia ===
In Australia, premium rate numbers generally begin with the prefix 19, with premium-rate voice services using the prefix 190x. Of these 1900 was the initial prefix and is the most common; since then 1901 and 1902 have also been allocated. The 1901 prefix is specifically reserved for "restricted services", where a user must register with the provider of the service on that number - these can include services of a sexual nature, although this is not the only definition of "restricted". The prefix 1906 is reserved for premium-rate paging services.

Other numbers beginning with 19 are generally used for premium rate short message service (SMS) services on mobile phones. These were originally trialled using the 188 prefix.

Previously (before the introduction of eight digit numbering), the prefix 0055 was used for this purpose, and as a result 190x numbers are occasionally referred to colloquially as 0055 numbers (pronounced double-oh, double-five).

The first digit of 1900 numbers is mainly 9; such numbers were converted from the 0055 prefix (for example, 0055 55 123 would become 1900 955 123.

=== New Zealand ===
In New Zealand, premium-rate telephone numbers begin with 0900. The service is used by phone sex companies, phone support services and for donations to charitable organizations.

== South America ==
=== Argentina ===
In Argentina, telephone numbers of the form 0600-xxx-xxxx and 0609-xxx-xxxx are premium rate numbers. The 0609 series is for entertainment (fixed rate), while 0600 is for services (the rate depends on the particular number).

=== Brazil ===
In Brazil, there is only one premium prefix: 0500, and this number is used by organizations receiving donations (it's a premium rate per call and not per minute).

In the 1990s, numbers starting with 900 were used for that purpose and later numbers starting with 0900 was available, but now is no longer allowed. As there are no longer premium numbers, TV shows now use mobile numbers to receive calls and generate revenue to their program.

For the same premium rate purpose, it is used of numbers destined to mobile phones with unusual code of selection of carriers for the purpose of charging a premium rate per minute. Ex: 0 91 41 98401–0101.

== Illicit use ==
Computer criminals have historically used premium-rate numbers to defraud unsuspecting Internet users. One scheme involved inducing computer users who used now-uncommon dial-up Internet access to download a program known as a dialer that surreptitiously dialed a premium-rate number, accumulating charges on the user's phone bill without their knowledge. Another now-uncommon premium-rate scam involved television programming that induced young children to dial the number, banking on the notion that they will be unaware of the charges that will be incurred. One variant, targeted at children too young to dial a number, enticed children to hold a landline telephone up to the television set while the DTMF tones of the number were played. This type of scam was especially popular in the late 1980s to early 1990s in the United States before tougher regulations on the 900 number business forced many of these businesses to close.

== See also ==
- Telecommunications tariffs
- Premium SMS
