= Telephone numbers in Europe =

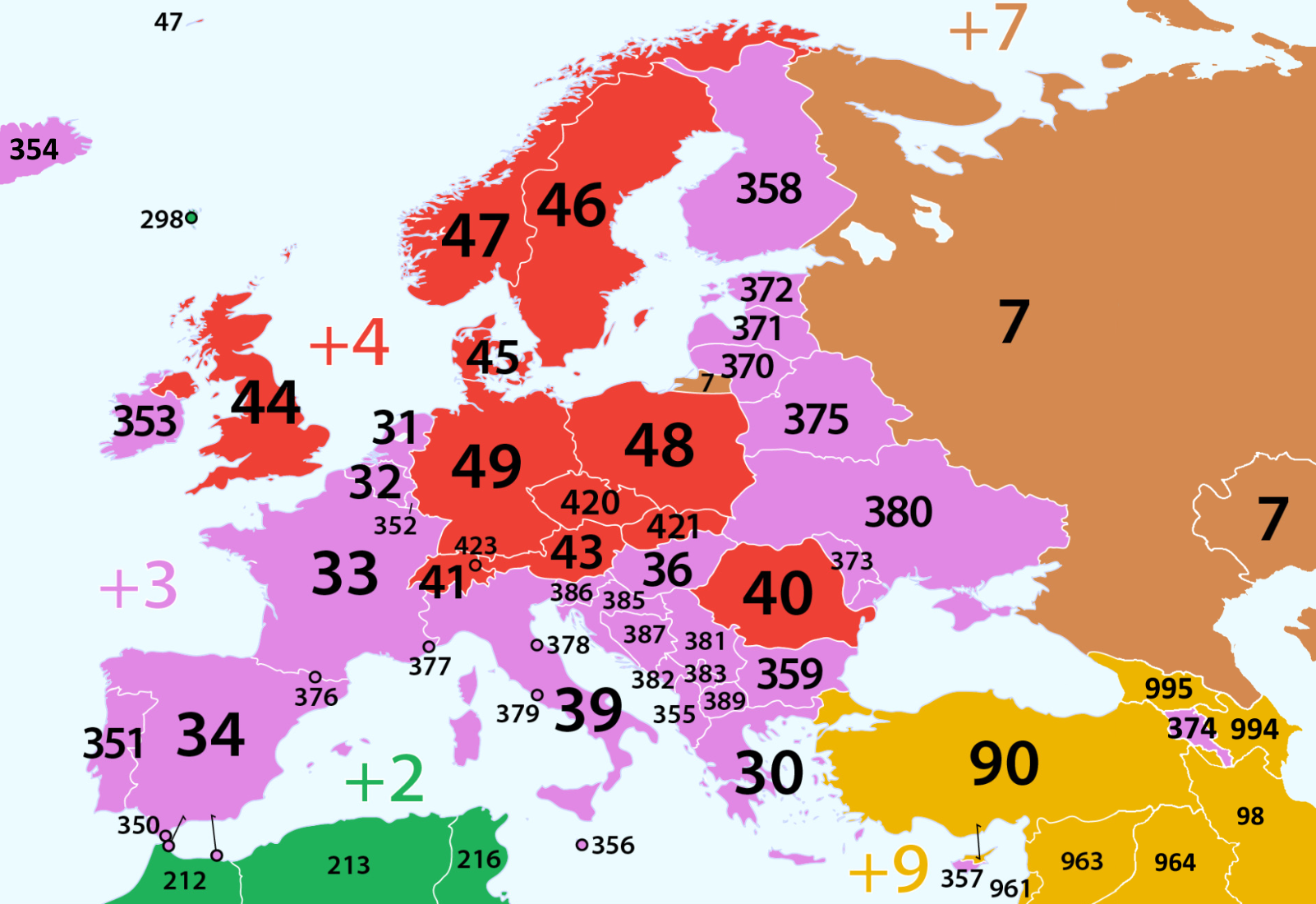
Calling codes in Europe

Telephone numbers in Europe are managed by the national telecommunications authorities of each country. Most telephone country codes start with 3 and 4, but some countries that are considered European have country codes starting on numbers most common outside of Europe (e.g. Faroe Islands of Denmark have a code starting on number 2, which is most common in Africa).

The international access code (dial out code) has been standardized as 00, as recommended by the International Telecommunication Union (ITU).

== European Economic Area ==
Country	Country code	National number length	Dialing plan *	International access code	National trunk prefix
Austria	43	4 to 13	variable	00	0
Belgium	32	8 to 10	fixed with 0	00	0
Bulgaria	359	7 to 9	variable	00	0
Croatia	385	8 or 9 (some mobile)	variable	00	0
Cyprus	357	8	fixed	00	
Czech Republic	420	9	fixed	00	
Denmark	45	8	fixed	00	
Estonia	372	7 (fixed or mobile), 8 (mobile)	fixed	00	
Finland	358	5 to 12	variable	00	0
France	33	9	fixed with 0	00	0
Germany	49	3 to 12	variable	00	0
Greece	30	4 to 5 (company numbers) 10 (fixed and mobile)	fixed	00	
Hungary	36	8 (landline) or 9 (mobile)	variable	00	06
Iceland	354	7 (mobile and landline) or 9 (for 3xxxxxxxx)	fixed	00	
(Republic of Ireland) Ireland	353	7 to 9; 10 (mobile voicemail and Northern Ireland)	variable	00	0
Italy	39	6 to 12 (generally 10)	fixed	00	
Latvia	371	8	fixed	00	
Liechtenstein	423	up to 12 (generally is 7)	fixed	00	0
Lithuania	370	8	variable	00	0
Luxembourg	352	8 (fixed new numbering plan); 9 (mobile); 12 (mobile telematic); 4-11 (historic numbers still active)	fixed	00	
Malta	356	8	fixed	00	
Netherlands	31	9	variable	00	0
Norway	47	4-12 (generally 8)	fixed	00	
Poland	48	9	fixed	00	
Portugal	351	9	fixed	00	
Romania	40	9	fixed with 0	00	0
Slovakia	421	9	variable	00	0
Slovenia	386	8	variable	00	0
Spain	34	9 (3 for emergency services, 4 for phone companies, 5 and starting with 118 for telephonic information, 6 and starting with 116 for social interest and 5 or 6 with starting with other numbers that are not listed before for premium services)	fixed	00	
Sweden	46	6 to 9		00	0
All European Economic Area member states apply the European Union roaming regulations. The regulation eventually led to the abolition of all roaming charges for temporary roaming when traveling within the EEA as of June 15, 2017. The European Union international calls regulations regulate prices of calls (and text messages) when calling from your home country to another EEA country.

== Other European countries/territories ==
Country	Country code	National number length	Dialing plan	International access code	National trunk prefix
Abkhazia †	7 840 (landline) / 7 940 (mobile)	7	variable	8~10	8
Albania	355	8 (fixed), 9 (mobile)	variable	00	0
Andorra	376	6 or 9 (in special cases)	fixed	00	
Armenia	374	8	variable	00	0
Azerbaijan	994	9	variable	00	0
Belarus	375	9	variable	00	8
Bosnia and Herzegovina	387	8 to 9	variable	00	0
Faroe Islands	298	6	fixed	00	
(Georgia (country)) Georgia	995	9	variable	00	0
Gibraltar	350	8	fixed	00	
Kazakhstan	7 (shared with Russia)	10	variable	8~10	8
Kosovo †	383	8	variable	00	0
North Macedonia	389	8	variable	00	0
Moldova	373	8	fixed with 0	00	0
Monaco	377	8 to 9	fixed (?)	00	0
Montenegro	382	8	fixed	00	0
Russia	7 (shared with Kazakhstan)	10	variable	8~10	8
San Marino	378	6 to 12	fixed	00	
Serbia	381	8 to 10	variable	00	0
South Ossetia †	7 850 (fixed), 7 929 (mobile)	5 to 7	variable	8~10	8
Switzerland	41	9	fixed with 0	00	0
Transnistria †	373 5 / 373 2 (Moldova codes used)	7	variable	00	0
Turkey	90	10	fixed	00	0
Northern Cyprus †	90 392 (fixed), 90 533 / 90 542 (mobile)	7	fixed	00	0
United Kingdom	44	9 or 10 digits (geographic); 7, 9 or 10 (non-geographic)	variable	00	0
Ukraine (Note: Following the 2022 Russian invasion of Ukraine, the Russian-backed separatist regions of Donetsk and Luhansk have been serviced with the Russian country code (7).)	380	9	variable	00	0
Vatican City	379 (not activated)				

† = Disputed state, may not be recognized as an independent state by some or all European Union members.

*A variable dialing plan has different dialing procedures for local and long-distance telephone calls. A call within the same city or within an area is dialed only by the subscriber number, while for calls outside the area, the telephone number must be prefixed with the destination area code. A fixed dialing plan requires to dial all digits of the complete telephone number, including any area codes.

== Harmonised service numbers ==
The following service numbers are harmonised across the European Union:

- 112 for emergency services
- 116xxx for (other) Harmonised service of social value

== 1996 single numbering plan proposal ==
In 1996, the European Commission proposed the introduction of a single European telephone numbering plan, in which all European Union member states would use the country code 3. Calls between member states would no longer require the international access code 00. Instead the digit 1 was proposed for these calls, replaced by the country code 3 for calls from outside the EU. Each country would have a two-digit country code after the 1 or the 3. Calls within each country would not be affected.

This proposal would have required states such as Germany, the United Kingdom, Denmark and others, whose country codes began with the digit '4', to return these to the International Telecommunication Union.

A green paper for the proposal was published, but the disruption and inconvenience of the change was deemed to outweigh any advantages.

A disadvantage would have been that every local number beginning with "1" would have had to be changed (except emergency number which would be kept). Furthermore, the change would have caused many dialing errors or misdirected calls, if callers use an old telephone number with the previous country code.

== See also ==
- National conventions for writing telephone numbers
- European Union roaming regulations
- List of telephone country codes
- List of international call prefixes
- Category:Telephone numbers by country
