= Telephone numbers in Luxembourg =

- Country: Luxembourg
- Continent: Europe
- Country code: +352
- International access: 00
- Long-distance: none

Telephone numbers in Luxembourg employ a closed dialling system, whereby all numbers are dialed in the same format whether from within Luxembourg or from abroad. There is no trunk prefix like "0".

The incumbent operator employed an open numbering plan with numbers of varying lengths, where a two-digit area identifier is followed by one to four digits, all six digits forming the subscriber number. This was changed by the introduction of a new numbering plan in 1999. Telephone numbers introduced since May 2000 by the incumbent operator begin with "2" (generally 26, 24 and recently 27) followed by two to six digits. The area identifier is still present and generally following the 26, 27 or 24, however numbers can be ported to any other area.

- 79 xxxx (example number in Consdorf)
- +352 79 xxxx (when dialed from outside Luxembourg)
- 2679 xxxx (example number in Consdorf for new lines since May 2000)
- +352 2679 xxxx (when dialed from outside Luxembourg)
- 4 xxx xx (example number in Luxembourg City)
- +352 4 xxx xx (when dialed from outside Luxembourg)

In Luxembourg, PBX extensions were generally appended to the main number, hence the need for an open numbering plan. As more PBXs were installed in offices in Luxembourg compared to areas with almost exclusively residential customers, this led to the impression that numbers in Luxembourg City would be longer than six digits. The regulator therefore decided that new phone numbers must be eight digits long including the extension. In order to fulfill this requirement, operators have to shorten a customer's phone number to 3-6 digits, to allow 2-5 digit extensions.

== Areas ==
LIST OF INITIAL DIGITS
Initial Digits	Place name
20	
21	
22	Luxembourg City
23	Mondorf-les-Bains/Bascharage/Noerdange/Remich
24 20	
24 21	Weicherdange
24 22	Luxembourg City
24 23	Mondorf-les-Bains/Bascharage/Noerdange/Remich
24 24	
24 25	Luxembourg
24 26	
24 27	
24 28	Luxembourg City
24 29	Luxembourg/Kockelscheuer
24 30	Capellen/Kehlen
24 31	Bertrange/Mamer/Munsbach/Strassen
24 32	Lintgen/Mersch/Steinfort
24 33	Walferdange
24 34	Rameldange/Senningerberg
24 35	Sandweiler/Moutfort/Roodt-Sur-Syre
24 36	Hesperange/Kockelscheuer/Roeser
24 37	Leudelange/Ehlange/Mondercange
24 38	
24 39	Windhof/Steinfort
24 40	Howald
24 41	
24 42	Plateau de Kirchberg
24 43	Findel/Kirchberg
24 44	
24 45	Diedrich
24 46	
24 47	Lintgen
24 48	Contern/Foetz
24 49	Howald
24 50	Bascharage/Petange/Rodange
24 51	Dudelange/Bettembourg/Livange
24 52	Dudelange
24 53	Esch-Sur-Alzette
24 54	Esch-Sur-Alzette
24 55	Esch-Sur-Alzette/Mondercange
24 56	Rumelange
24 57	Esch-sur-Alzette/Schifflange
24 58	Soleuvre/Differdange
24 59	Soleuvre
24 67	Dudelange
24 70	
24 71	Betzdorf
24 72	Echternach
24 73	Rosport
24 74	Wasserbillig
24 75	Grevenmacher-Sur-Moselle
24 76	Wormeldange
24 77	
24 78	Junglinster
24 79	Berdorf/Consdorf
24 80	Diekirch
24 81	Ettelbruck/Reckange-Sur-Mess
24 82	
24 83	Vianden
24 84	
24 85	Bissen/Roost
24 86	
24 87	Larochette
24 88	Mertzig/Wahl
24 89	
24 90	
24 91	
24 92	Clervaux/Fischbach/Hosingen
24 93	
24 94	
24 95	Wiltz
24 96	
24 97	Huldange
24 98	
24 99	Troisvierges
25	Luxembourg
26 20	
26 21	Weicherdange
26 22	Luxembourg City
26 23	Mondorf-les-Bains/Bascharage/Noerdange/Remich
26 24	
26 25	Luxembourg
26 26	
26 27	Belair, Luxembourg City
26 28	Luxembourg City
26 29	Luxembourg/Kockelscheuer
26 30	Capellen/Kehlen
26 31	Bertrange/Mamer/Munsbach/Strassen
26 32	Lintgen/Mersch/Steinfort
26 33	Walferdange
26 34	Rameldange/Senningerberg
26 35	Sandweiler/Moutfort/Roodt-Sur-Syre
26 36	Hesperange/Kockelscheuer/Roeser
26 37	Leudelange/Ehlange/Mondercange
26 38	
26 39	Windhof/Steinfort
26 40	Howald
26 41	
26 42	Plateau de Kirchberg
26 43	Findel/Kirchberg
26 44	
26 45	Uerschterhaff
26 46	
26 47	Lintgen
26 48	Contern/Foetz
26 49	Howald
26 50	Bascharage/Petange/Rodange
26 51	Dudelange/Bettembourg/Livange
26 52	Dudelange
26 53	Esch-Sur-Alzette
26 54	Esch-Sur-Alzette
26 55	Esch-Sur-Alzette/Mondercange
26 56	Rumelange
26 57	Esch-sur-Alzette/Schifflange
26 58	Soleuvre/Differdange
26 59	Soleuvre
26 67	Dudelange
26 70	
26 71	Betzdorf
26 72	Echternach
26 73	Rosport
26 74	Wasserbillig
26 75	Grevenmacher-Sur-Moselle
26 76	Wormeldange
26 77	
26 78	Junglinster
26 79	Berdorf/Consdorf
26 80	Diekirch
26 81	Ettelbruck/Reckange-Sur-Mess
26 82	
26 83	Vianden
26 84	Han/Lesse
26 85	Bissen/Roost
26 86	
26 87	Larochette
26 88	Mertzig/Wahl
26 89	
26 90	
26 91	
26 92	Clervaux/Fischbach/Hosingen
26 93	
26 94	
26 95	Wiltz
26 96	
26 97	Huldange
26 98	
26 99	Troisvierges
27 20	
27 21	Weicherdange
27 22	Luxembourg City
27 23	Mondorf-les-Bains/Bascharage/Noerdange/Remich
27 24	
27 25	Luxembourg
27 26	
27 27	
27 28	Luxembourg City
27 29	Luxembourg/Kockelscheuer
27 30	Capellen/Kehlen
27 31	Bertrange/Mamer/Munsbach/Strassen
27 32	Lintgen/Mersch/Steinfort
27 33	Walferdange
27 34	Rameldange/Senningerberg
27 35	Sandweiler/Moutfort/Roodt-Sur-Syre
27 36	Hesperange/Kockelscheuer/Roeser
27 37	Leudelange/Ehlange/Mondercange
27 38	
27 39	Windhof/Steinfort
27 40	Howald
27 41	
27 42	Plateau de Kirchberg
27 43	Findel/Kirchberg
27 44	
27 45	Diedrich
27 46	
27 47	Lintgen
27 48	Contern/Foetz
27 49	Howald
27 50	Bascharage/Petange/Rodange
27 51	Dudelange/Bettembourg/Livange
27 52	Dudelange
27 53	Esch-Sur-Alzette
27 54	Esch-Sur-Alzette
27 55	Esch-Sur-Alzette/Mondercange
27 56	Rumelange
27 57	Esch-sur-Alzette/Schifflange
27 58	Soleuvre/Differdange
27 59	Soleuvre
27 67	Dudelange
27 70	
27 71	Betzdorf
27 72	Echternach
27 73	Rosport
27 74	Wasserbillig
27 75	Grevenmacher-Sur-Moselle
27 76	Wormeldange
27 77	
27 78	Junglinster
27 79	Berdorf/Consdorf
27 80	Diekirch
27 81	Ettelbruck/Reckange-Sur-Mess
27 82	
27 83	Vianden
27 84	Han/Lesse
27 85	Bissen/Roost
27 86	
27 87	Larochette
27 88	Mertzig/Wahl
27 89	
27 90	
27 91	
27 92	Clervaux/Fischbach/Hosingen
27 93	
27 94	
27 95	Wiltz
27 96	
27 97	Huldange
27 98	
27 99	Troisvierges
28	Luxembourg City
29	Luxembourg/Kockelscheuer
30	Capellen/Kehlen
31	Bertrange/Mamer/Munsbach/Strassen
32	Lintgen/Mersch/Steinfort
33	Walferdange/Steinsel/Heisdorf
34	Rameldange/Senningerberg
35	Sandweiler/Moutfort/Roodt-Sur-Syre
36	Hesperange/Kockelscheuer/Roeser
37	Leudelange/Ehlange/Mondercange
38	
39	Windhof/Steinfort
4	Luxembourg City
40	Howald
41	
42	Plateau de Kirchberg
43	Findel/Kirchberg
44	
45	Diedrich
46	
47	Lintgen
48	Contern/Foetz
49	Howald
50	Bascharage/Petange/Rodange
51	Dudelange/Bettembourg/Livange
52	Dudelange
53	Esch-Sur-Alzette
54	Esch-Sur-Alzette
55	Esch-Sur-Alzette/Mondercange
56	Rumelange
57	Esch-sur-Alzette/Schifflange
58	Soleuvre/Differdange
59	Soleuvre
67	Dudelange
70	
71	Betzdorf
72	Echternach
73	Rosport
74	Wasserbillig
75	Grevenmacher-Sur-Moselle
76	Wormeldange
77	
78	Junglinster
79	Berdorf/Consdorf
80	Diekirch
81	Ettelbruck/Reckange-Sur-Mess
82	
83	Vianden
84	Han/Lesse
85	Bissen/Roost
86	
87	Larochette
88	Mertzig/Wahl
89	Esch-sur-Sûre
90	
91	
92	Clervaux/Fischbach/Hosingen
93	
94	
95	Wiltz
96	
97	Huldange
98	
99	Troisvierges

== Mobile Numbers ==
Mobile telephone numbers always carry a three-digit network code, in the format "6x1", which is followed by six digits. The leading "6" of these numbers is not omitted when dialing from abroad.

- 6x1 xxx xxx (within Luxembourg)
- +352 6x1 xxx xxx (outside Luxembourg)

These codes were introduced on 1 September 2006, replacing codes in the format "0x1". Existing numbers were converted to the new format.

Starting January 2019, the voice mail number is generic, reachable only from the subscriber itself (or as result of the call forwarding when busy/non reachable ...): 352691000700

Until January 2019, the voice mail number followed the below rule: Each mobile number has an equivalent voicemail number, the network code is in the format "6x8" (note: format does NOT apply to Join Experience).

The mobile network codes are:

- 621: POST Telecom (formerly LuxGSM)
- 651: Eltrona (mvno on POST Telecom), starting 2017
- 661: Orange
- 671: Join Experience
- 691: Proximus Luxembourg (Tango)

In June 2009, a new numbering range for mobile machine-to-machine communication was introduced. The numbers have a fixed length of 12 digits and start with "60", the only assigned network code from this range is:

- 6021: POST Telecom (formerly LuxGSM)
