= Telephone numbers in Estonia =

Location
- Country: Estonia
- Continent: Europe
- Type: closed
- NSN length: 7-12
- Format: xxx xxxx (landline and mobile) xxxx xxxx (mobile) xxxx xxx xxx (some freephone numbers)

Access codes
- Country code: +372
- International access: 00
- Long-distance: none

Telephone numbers in Estonia follow a closed telephone numbering plan.

The numbering plan of Estonia was reorganised from 1 May 2003 into closed numbering plan. All calls inside Estonia are local; trunk codes are not used.

	Within Estonia	Outside Estonia
Before 2003	0 xxx xxxx	+372 xxx xxxx
After 2003	xxx xxxx	+372 xxx xxxx

Landline phone numbers have 7 digits, mobile numbers can have either 7 or 8 digits, machine-to-machine (M2M) numbers can be up to 12 digits.

Telephone numbers are portable between locations and operators.

The country code for Estonia is +372. The country does not use trunk prefix. During the Soviet period and until the transition in 1993, Estonia used the +7 014 area code.

== Numbering plan ==
 32x xxxx      Landline
 33x xxxx      Landline
 35x xxxx      Landline
 38x xxxx      Landline
 39x xxxx      Landline
 40xx xxxx     eFax Service
 43x xxxx      Landline
 44x xxxx      Landline
 45x xxxx      Landline
 46x xxxx      Landline
 47x xxxx      Landline
 48x xxxx      Landline
 5xx xxxx      Mobile
 5xxx xxxx     Mobile
 60x xxxx      Landline
 61x xxxx      Landline
 62x xxxx      Landline
 63x xxxx      Landline
 64x xxxx      Landline
 65x xxxx      Landline
 66x xxxx      Landline
 67x xxxx      Landline
 68x xxxx      Landline
 71x xxxx      Landline
 72x xxxx      Landline
 73x xxxx      Landline
 74x xxxx      Landline
 75x xxxx      Landline
 76x xxxx      Landline
 77x xxxx      Landline
 78x xxxx      Landline
 79x xxxx      Landline
 8000 xxxx     International Freephone Service (IFS)
 8001 xxxx     International Freephone Service (IFS) Home Country Direct
 8002 xxx      Freephone
 8003 xxx      Freephone
 8004 xxx      Freephone
 8005 xxx      Freephone
 8006 xxx      Freephone
 8007 xxx      Freephone
 8008 xxx      Freephone
 8009 xxx      Freephone
 81xx xxxx     Mobile
 82xx xxxx     Mobile
 83xx xxxx     Mobile
 84xx xxxx     Mobile
 85xx xxxx     Mobile
 86xx xxxx     Mobile
 87xx xxxx     Mobile
 88x xxxx      Landline
 900 xxxx      Premium rate service

== Example call ==
 When calling the Estonian number 799 2222:
 *From inside Estonia:       799 2222
 *From other countries: +372 799 2222

== Special numbers ==
 112 - European emergency phone number[6]
 116 - Harmonised European Short Codes (HESC)[7]
 1247 - State helpline, +372 600 1247 from abroad[8]
 1343 - Report an electric circuit breakdown 24 h[9]
