= Telephone numbers in Bulgaria =

- Country: Bulgaria
- Continent: Europe
- NSN length: 8 (9 for mobile numbers)
- Format: (02) xxx xxxx (Sofia) (0xx) xx xxxx (0xxx) xxxxx (0xxxx) xxxx 08z xxx xxxx (mobiles); 0800 xxxxx (freephone)
- Country code: 359
- International access: 00
- Long-distance: 0

Telephone numbers in Bulgaria are administered and regulated by the Communications Regulation Commission, which publishes information about the National Numbering Plan for telephone services. Internationally the country participates in the E.164 world numbering plan with telephone country code 359.

For all calls within the country, the full national number must be dialed for all calls. Dialing between area codes the national number is prefixed with trunk code of 0.

== Dialing example ==
For example, to call a number in Sofia, dial:

- 02 xxx xxxx from inside Bulgaria
- +359 2 xxx xxxx from outside Bulgaria

== Fixed-line numbers ==
Domestic numbers are limited to eight digits in length. Area codes vary in length from one to five digits. Subscriber number lengths vary accordingly, from seven digits down to three digits. Sofia lines on digital switches have seven-digit numbers, those on analog switches had six; in Plovdiv, Varna and Ruse both are six digits; and in most other province capitals lines on digital switches have six-digit numbers and analog had five.

For a very long time, the state-owned Bulgarian Telecommunications Company (BTC) had a monopoly on fixed telephone networks. However, this ended when a special law was adopted. BTC was privatized in 2004 and competing operators appeared.

Larger areas, such as Sofia, Plovdiv, Varna, and Burgas, are subdivided into zones. Although one cannot further reduce the number of dialed digits, the number itself shows which zone it is located in. For example, in Sofia, numbers starting with 2, 82, 92 are located in the Western suburbs, 7, 87, 97 in the Eastern suburbs, and 98 in the central area.

Around 2010, the intensive process of replacing the old analog switches with modern digital ones completed. In some areas it is even possible to guess if a subscriber number was changed from analog to digital during its existence or was subscribed as digital initially. For example, in Blagoevgrad a number starting with 88 was subscribed as digital, and a number starting with a single 8 was analog before.

The first digit also shows if a particular subscriber number is operated by BTC or another operator.

The area codes are always cited with the trunk code. When dialing, all subscriber numbers must be prefixed with trunk and area code except short codes. Numbers starting with 700, 800 and 90x as well as mobile ones are prefixed by '0' only. When dialing from abroad, the trunk code 0 is replaced with the country code 359.

== Mobile numbers ==
Until 20 July 2003 GSM networks used six-digit subscriber numbers in accordance with the limit of eight digits for the domestic part of a number. With the increase of subscribers (and an international requirement), all (except Vivacom, which started operations in 2006) acquired new access codes. On 20 July 2003, Mobiltel used three codes ((0)87, (0)88, (0)89) and Globul used two ((0)98 and (0)99). When these limits were also to be overwhelmed, seven-digit subscriber numbers and single access codes per operator were introduced, hence M-tel (now A1) reverted to 088 ( and 7 digits) only, while Globul (now Yettel) took the old M-tel code 089 (and 7 digits), and the rest were freed up. (Mobikom had gone through a similar change in the mid-90s – from (0)799 to (0)48).

Dialing to a mobile network requires the access code together with the 0. Dialing from a mobile network requires either an area or access code with the trunk or international format ((0)YY YXXX XXX or +359 YY YXXX XXX). The latter becomes a normal practice, since most people use number lists of their handsets, more people use their phones in roaming and all four operators show the caller ID in international format.

== Area codes ==
As in many countries, an area code is often written with the trunk code 0 prefixed.

Code	Area or service
17x	Paging services (six digits, not active: 177: Link Paging, 178: Varna Page, 179: Mobipage)
2	Sofia
30x	Smolyan Province codes (301: Smolyan, 309: Pamporovo)
30xx	Smolyan Province codes (301: Smolyan, 309: Pamporovo)
30xxx	Smolyan Province codes (301: Smolyan, 309: Pamporovo)
31x	Plovdiv Province codes
31xx	Plovdiv Province codes
31xxx	Plovdiv Province codes
32	Plovdiv
33x	Plovdiv Province codes (331: Asenovgrad)
33xx	Plovdiv Province codes (331: Asenovgrad)
34	Pazardzhik
35x	Pazardzhik Province codes (350: Peshtera, 359: Velingrad)
35xx	
35xxx	
36x	Kardzhali Province codes (361: Kardzhali)
36xx	Kardzhali Province codes (361: Kardzhali)
36xxx	Kardzhali Province codes (361: Kardzhali)
37x	Haskovo Province codes (373: Harmanli, 379: Svilengrad)
37xx	Haskovo Province codes (373: Harmanli, 379: Svilengrad)
37xxx	Haskovo Province codes (373: Harmanli, 379: Svilengrad)
38	Haskovo
39x	Haskovo Province codes (391: Dimitrovgrad)
39xx	Haskovo Province codes (391: Dimitrovgrad)
41x	Stara Zagora Province codes (416: Chirpan)
41xx	Stara Zagora Province codes (416: Chirpan)
41xxx	Stara Zagora Province codes (416: Chirpan)
42	Stara Zagora
430	Tetra mobile network
43x	Stara Zagora Province codes (431: Kazanlak)
43xx	Stara Zagora Province codes (431: Kazanlak)
43xxx	Stara Zagora Province codes (431: Kazanlak)
44	Silven
45x	Sliven Province codes (453: Kotel, 457: Nova Zagora, 454: Tvarditza)
45xx	Sliven Province codes (453: Kotel, 457: Nova Zagora, 454: Tvarditza)
46	Yambol
47x	Yambol and Haskovo Provinces codes (470: Topolovgrad, 478: Elhovo)
47xx	Yambol and Haskovo Provinces codes (470: Topolovgrad, 478: Elhovo)
47xxx	Yambol and Haskovo Provinces codes (470: Topolovgrad, 478: Elhovo)
48	NMT mobile network Mobikom (six digits), disused
51x	Varna Province codes (518: Provadiya, 519: Devnya)
51xx	Varna Province codes (518: Provadiya, 519: Devnya)
51xxx	Varna Province codes (518: Provadiya, 519: Devnya)
52	Varna
53x	Shumen Province codes (537: Novi Pazar, 538: Veliki Preslav)
53xx	Shumen Province codes (537: Novi Pazar, 538: Veliki Preslav)
53xxx	Shumen Province codes (537: Novi Pazar, 538: Veliki Preslav)
54	Shumen
55x	Burgas Province codes (550: Sinemorets, 554: Nesebar)
55xx	Burgas Province codes (550: Sinemorets, 554: Nesebar)
55xxx	Burgas Province codes (550: Sinemorets, 554: Nesebar)
56	Burgas
57x	Dobrich Province codes (570: Kavarna, 579: Balchik)
57xx	Dobrich Province codes (570: Kavarna, 579: Balchik)
57xxx	Dobrich Province codes (570: Kavarna, 579: Balchik)
58	Dobrich
59x	Burgas Province codes (590: Ahtopol, 596: Pomorie)
59xx	Burgas Province codes (590: Ahtopol, 596: Pomorie)
59xxx	Burgas Province codes (590: Ahtopol, 596: Pomorie)
60x	Targovishte Province codes (601: Targovishte, 608: Popovo)
60xx	Targovishte Province codes (601: Targovishte, 608: Popovo)
60xxx	Targovishte Province codes (601: Targovishte, 608: Popovo)
61x	Veliko Tarnovo Province codes (610: Pavlikeni, 618 Gorna Oryahovitza)
61xx	Veliko Tarnovo Province codes (610: Pavlikeni, 618 Gorna Oryahovitza)
61xxx	Veliko Tarnovo Province codes (610: Pavlikeni, 618 Gorna Oryahovitza)
62	Veliko Tarnovo
63x	Veliko Tarnovo and Pleven Provinces codes (631: Svishtov)
63xx	Veliko Tarnovo and Pleven Provinces codes (631: Svishtov)
63xxx	Veliko Tarnovo and Pleven Provinces codes (631: Svishtov)
64	Pleven
65x	Pleven Province codes (650: Levski, 658: Belene)
65xx	Pleven Province codes (650: Levski, 658: Belene)
65xxx	Pleven Province codes (650: Levski, 658: Belene)
66	Gabrovo
67x	Gabrovo and Lovech Provinces codes (670: Troyan, 675: Sevlievo)
67xx	Gabrovo and Lovech Provinces codes (670: Troyan, 675: Sevlievo)
67xxx	Gabrovo and Lovech Provinces codes (670: Troyan, 675: Sevlievo)
68	Lovech
69x	Lovech Province codes (697: Lukovit)
69xx	Lovech Province codes (697: Lukovit)
69xxx	Lovech Province codes (697: Lukovit)
700	Local rate numbers (five digits)
70x	Kyustendil Province codes (701: Dupnitsa, 702: Bobov Dol, 707: Sapareva Banya)
70xx	Kyustendil Province codes (701: Dupnitsa, 702: Bobov Dol, 707: Sapareva Banya)
71xx	Sofia Province codes (718: Koprivshtitsa, 720: Etropole, 721: Kostinbrod, 722: Samokov, 723: Botevgrad, 726: Svoge, 729: Godech)
71xx	Sofia Province codes (718: Koprivshtitsa, 720: Etropole, 721: Kostinbrod, 722: Samokov, 723: Botevgrad, 726: Svoge, 729: Godech)
72x	Sofia Province codes (718: Koprivshtitsa, 720: Etropole, 721: Kostinbrod, 722: Samokov, 723: Botevgrad, 726: Svoge, 729: Godech)
73	Blagoevgrad
74x	Blagoevgrad Province codes (745: Petrich, 746: Sandanski, 747: Razlog, 749: Bansko)
74xx	Blagoevgrad Province codes (745: Petrich, 746: Sandanski, 747: Razlog, 749: Bansko)
75xxx	Blagoevgrad Province codes (745: Petrich, 746: Sandanski, 747: Razlog, 749: Bansko)
75x	Blagoevgrad and Sofia Provinces codes (750: Borovets, 751: Gotse Delchev)
75xx	Blagoevgrad and Sofia Provinces codes (750: Borovets, 751: Gotse Delchev)
75xxx	Blagoevgrad and Sofia Provinces codes (750: Borovets, 751: Gotse Delchev)
76	Pernik
77x	Pernik Province codes (777: Radomir)
77xx	Pernik Province codes (777: Radomir)
77xxx	Pernik Province codes (777: Radomir)
78	Kyustendil
79xx	Kyustendil Province codes
799	NMT mobile network Mobikom, disused, replaced by 048
800	Toll free numbers (five digits)
81x	Ruse Province codes (817: Byala)
81xx	Ruse Province codes (817: Byala)
81xxx	Ruse Province codes (817: Byala)
82	Ruse
84	Razgrad
86	Silistra
87	GSM/UMTS/LTE/NR mobile network Vivacom (seven digits) *
88	GSM/UMTS/LTE/NR mobile network A1 (seven digits)
89	GSM/UMTS/LTE/NR mobile network Yettel (seven digits) *
90x	Value added services (five digits)
91x	Vratsa Province codes (910: Mezdra, 915: Byala Slatina)
91xx	Vratsa Province codes (910: Mezdra, 915: Byala Slatina)
91xxx	Vratsa Province codes (910: Mezdra, 915: Byala Slatina)
92	Vratsa
93x	Vidin Province codes (936: Belogradchik, 938: Kula)
93xx	Vidin Province codes (936: Belogradchik, 938: Kula)
93xxx	Vidin Province codes (936: Belogradchik, 938: Kula)
94	Vidin
95x	Montana Province codes (953: Berkovitsa)
95xx	Montana Province codes (953: Berkovitsa)
95xxx	Montana Province codes (953: Berkovitsa)
96	Montana
97x	Vratsa and Montana Province codes (971: Lom, 973: Kozloduy)
97xx	Vratsa and Montana Province codes (971: Lom, 973: Kozloduy)
97xxx	Vratsa and Montana Province codes (971: Lom, 973: Kozloduy)
98	MVNOs on GSM/UMTS mobile network A1 (seven digits) †
999	LTE/WiMAX network MAX Telecom †

* Until 2003, the codes 089 and 087 were used by M-Tel
† Until 2003, the codes 098 and 099 were used by Telenor – see above.

== Short codes ==
Code	Service
112	emergency
120	wake up call
121	operator for long-distance calls within Bulgaria
123	operator for international calls
124	operator for international calls
125	operator for international calls
130	phone lines problems
143	emergency road service & road assistance
144	telephone information service
146	emergency road service & road assistance
147	area codes within Bulgaria
148	area codes within Bulgaria
149	area codes within Bulgaria
152	BTC local calls rates
153	BTC long-distance within Bulgaria calls rates
154	BTC international calls rates
157	BTC international calls rates
159	cultural events guide
164	shipping information (in Bourgas and Varna)
167	horoscope
168	National Radio schedule
169	horoscope
170	BTC assistance
171	theater schedule (by city)
172	currency exchange rates
173	tales for kids
174	trains time-table (by city)
175	weather forecast
176	BTC information
177	tales for kids
178	pharmacy information
179	currency exchange rates
180	time service
181	TV programs
182	tramp shipping information (in Bourgas and Varna)
183	ocean shipping information (in Bourgas and Varna)
184	tanker shipping information (in Bourgas and Varna)
185	line shipping information (in Bourgas and Varna)
186	BTC digital services information
187	send a telegram
188	TV programs
190	BTC rates guide
191	cinema schedule (by city)
192	TV programs
193	TV programs
194	TV programs
195	sport news
196	sport lottery results
197	international dialing codes
198	BTC terms of payment
199	automatic telephone information guide
