= Telephone numbers in Monaco =

- Country: Monaco
- Continent: Europe
- NSN length: 8
- Format: xx xx xx xx
- Country code: 377
- International access: 00
- Long-distance: none

Telephone numbers in Monaco consist of eight digits. Fixed line numbers begin with the digit 9 and mobile phone numbers with the digit 6.

== Overview ==
Until 21 June 1996 Monaco used a part of the French numbering plan, with fixed line numbers beginning with 93. On that date the principality began using country code 377. Consequently, all calls between France and Monaco have to be dialled in international format, including those to and from surrounding areas in France.

From Monaco to France
00 33 x xx xx xx xx

From France to Monaco
00 377 xx xx xx xx

Mobile phone operators in at least two other jurisdictions, specifically Lonestar Cell in Liberia and Vala in Kosovo, have also used country code 377. Vala's use of 377 ceased on 3 February 2017, when Kosovo implemented country code 383.

== See also ==
- Telecommunications in Monaco
