= Telephone numbers in Albania =

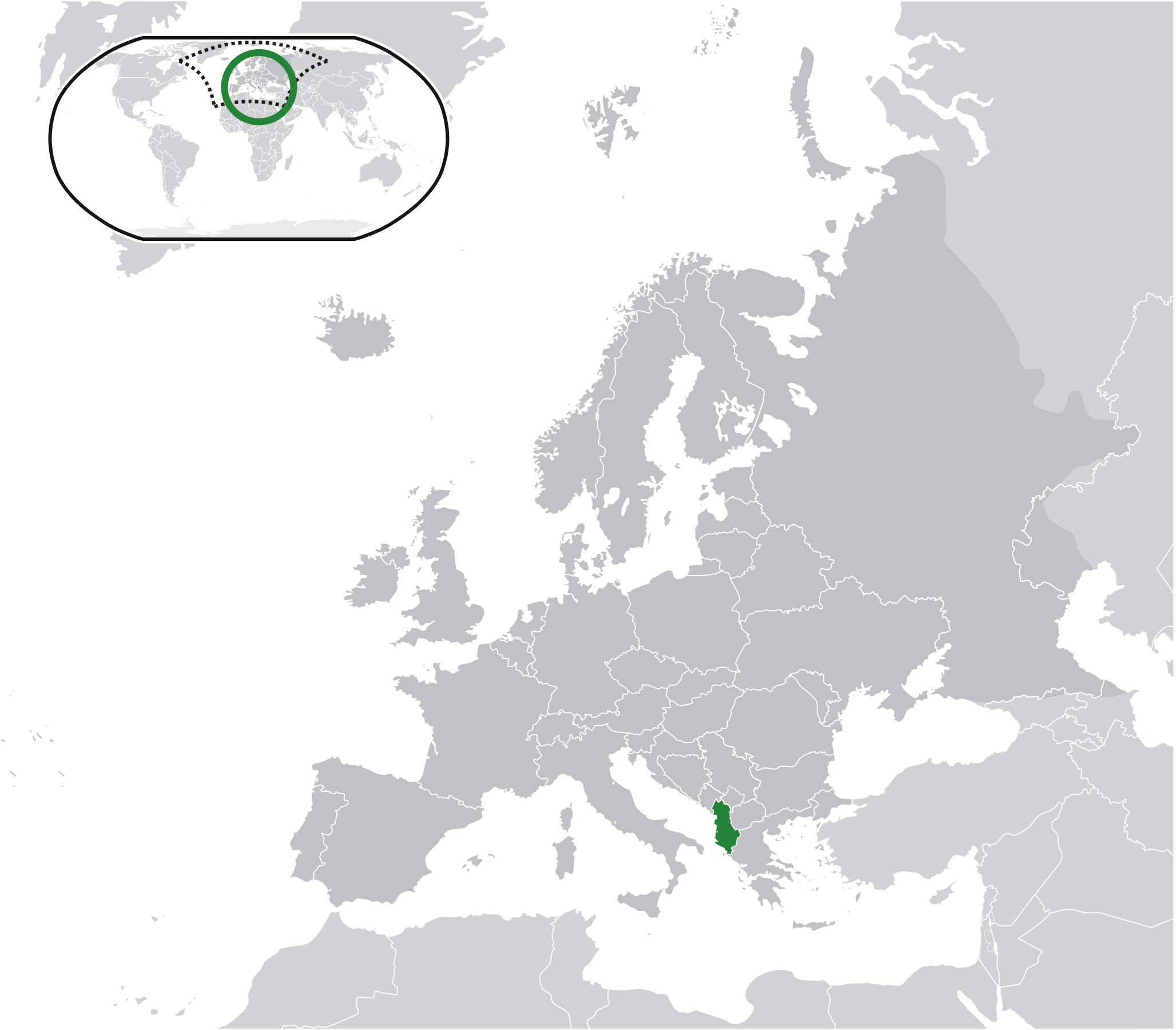
- Location of Albania (dark green)

Location
- Country: Albania
- Continent: Europe
- Regulator: AKEP
- Type: Open
- Format: 0XX XXX XXXX

Access codes
- Country code: +355
- International access: 00
- Long-distance: 0

For domestic calls (within the country), 0 must be dialled before the user number of another administrative unit. The prefix for international calls from Albania is 00 (e.g., for a United States number 00 1 ... should be dialled). Below is an explanation when dialling a number within the Tirana administrative unit:

     0 4 xxx xxxx    (from within the Tirana administrative unit)
     0 4 xxx xxxx    (from within Albania, but outside Tirana)
  +355 4 xxx xxxx    (from outside Albania)

== History ==
Albania has the lowest rate of telephone use per capita in Europe with roughly 10 lines per 100 people as of 2008 ITU statistics. As a result, cellular phone use is very common throughout the country. The numbering plan has constantly evolved during the last 30 years. Tirana has passed to a seven digit plan as of 2008 from a four digit plan in the communist period by gradually adding one digit.

== New Numbering Plan and Addition of Digit "2" ==
As of March 2008, a new numbering plan was introduced in an effort to improve the quality of the service and increase fixed phone use in Albania. The old plan stayed in effect in parallel to the new until 15 September 2008.

The new numbering plan introduces a new digit, represented by the number 2 that is put in front of local telephone numbers country-wide. For example, to dial a Tirana number with the old plan, it would have looked like XXX XXX. With the new plan, the digit 2 is added to form 2XXX XXX. The old plan is defunct and not longer in operation. In total, there are 8 digits for every phone number in the country.

Additionally, changes include the replacement of the Municipality of Laç's calling code with the new 53 code.

== Numbering plan by Municipality (effective 15 September 2008) ==
This is a list of prior area codes within Albania, incorporated into the user number as of 1 January 2014. To call from one administrative unit to another one, the digit "0" still has to be dialled first, but there is no change when calling from outside Albania.

Municipality	Code
Shkodër	22
Vau-Dejës	261
Koplik	211
Bajram Curri	213
Pukë	212
Fushë-Arrëz	271
Kukës	24
Krumë	214
Lezhë	215
Rrëshen	216
Rubik	284
Burrel	217
Klos	287
Peshkopi	218
Bulqizë	219
Berat	32
Ura Vajgurore	361
Kuçovë	311
Çorovodë	312
Poliçan	368
Lushnje	35
Divjakë	371
Fier	34
Patos	381
Roskovec	382
Ballsh	313
Vlorë	33
Orikum	391
Selenicë	392
Himarë	393
Tirana	4
Kamëz	47
Vorë	47
Laç	53
Mamurras	561
Kruje	511
Fushë-Krujë	563
Durrës	52
Shijak	571
Manëz	572
Sukth	573
Kavajë	55
Rrogozhinë	577
Peqin	512
Elbasan	54
Cërrik	581
Belsh	582
Bradashesh	583
Gramsh	513
Librazhd	514
Përrenjas	591
Pogradec	83
Korçë	82
Maliq	861
Bilisht	811
Ersekë	812
Leskovik	871
Përmet	813
Këlcyrë	875
Tepelenë	814
Memaliaj	885
Gjirokastër	84
Libohovë	881
Sarandë	85
Konispol	891
Delvinë	815

== Mobile phone codes ==
Operator	Code
Vodafone Albania	069
One Albania	068/067

== Emergency numbers ==
Emergency service	Number
Road police	129
Ambulance	127
Fire brigade	128
Police	129
Emergency at sea	125
