= Telephone numbers in Nepal =

- Country: Nepal
- Continent: Asia
- NSN length: 8 (fixed numbers); 10 (mobile numbers)
- Country code: +977
- International access: 00
- Long-distance: none

Telephone numbers in Nepal use the country calling code +977 and the international call prefix 00; there is no domestic trunk prefix. Fixed-line numbers have eight-digit national significant numbers and use geographic area codes. Kathmandu uses area code 1, while other localities are assigned separate STD codes. Mobile telephone numbers have ten digits, with prefixes including 97 and 98.

== National Significant Numbers (NSN) ==
NUMBER FORMAT
Network	Area code	Format	Remarks
Fixed (Kathmandu city)	+977 1	+977 1 YXXX XXX	Y = 4, 5, 6
Fixed (other areas)	+977 AB XX XXX	+977 AB YXX XXX	A = 1 <= 9 B = 0 <= 9 Y = 4, 5, 6

== STD Codes ==
Achham 97

Arghakhanchi 77

Baglung 68

Bandipur 100

Banepa 11

Bardiya 84

Beni 69

Besisahar 66

Bhadrapur 23

Bhairawaha 71

Bhajani 91

Bhaktapur 1

Bharatpur 56

Bhairahawa 71

Bairghat 78

Bhimphedi 57

Bhojpur 29

Bidur 10

Biratnagar 21

Birgung 51

Birtamod 23

Butwal 71

Charikot 49

Chhotkram Nager 71

Chitwan 056

Dadheldhura 96

Damak 23

Damauli 65

Dang 82

Darchula 93

Dhading 10

Dhangadi 91

Dhankuta 26

Dharan 25

Dipayal 94

Dodharachadani 99

Doti 94

Duhabi 25

Gaighat 35

Gaur 55

Ghorahi 82

Gorkha 64

Guleria 84

Gulmi 79

Hetauda 57

Ilam 27

Inaruwa 25

Itahari 21

Jaleshwar 44

Janakpur 41

Kalaiya 53

Katari 35

Kathmandu 1

Khadbari 29

Khotang 36

Khusma 67

Krishnanagar 76

Lahan 33

Lalitpur 1

Lumbini 71

Lumjung 66

Mahendranagar 99

Malangawa 46

Morang 021

Myagdi 69

Nawalparasi 78

Nepalgunj 81

Okhaldhunga 37

Palpa 75

Panchthar 24

Parasi 78

Patan 1

Phidim 24

Pokhara 61

Rajbiraj 31

Rajpur 84

Ramechap 48

Rangeli 21

Rasuwa 10

Sandikharka 77

Sankhuwasava 29

Simra 53

Sindhuli 47

Siraha 33

Surkhet 83

Syanja 63

Tandi 56

Tansen 75

Taplejung 24

Taulihawa 76

Terathum 26

Tikapur 91

Tribeni 78

Trishuli 10

Tulsipur 82

Udaipur 35

Khotang 13

Mobile phone 98, 97
