= Telephone numbers in Finland =

- Country: Finland
- Continent: Europe
- Regulator: Traficom
- Numbering plan type: Open
- NSN length: 5 to 12
- Country code: +358
- International access: 00
- Long-distance: 0

All of Finland, including Åland, has the same country code, +358.

Finland's numbering plan was reorganised in 1996, with the number of area codes being reduced, and the trunk code being changed from 9 to 0. This meant that the area code for Helsinki also changed:

	Within Finland	Outside Finland
Before 1996	90 xxx xxx	+358 0 xxx xxx
After 1996	09 xxx xxx	+358 9 xxx xxx

== Geographic area codes ==
013	North Karelia (Pohjois-Karjala / Norra Karelen)
014	Central Finland (Keski-Suomi / Mellersta Finland)
015	Mikkeli (Mikkeli / S:t Michel)
016	Lapland (Lappi / Lappland)
017	Kuopio
018	Åland
019	Uusimaa (Uusimaa / Nyland)
02 (except 020, 029)	Turku and Pori (Turku ja Pori / Åbo och Björneborg)
03	Häme (Häme / Tavastland)
05 (except 050)	Kymi (Kymi / Kymmene)
06 (except 060)	Vaasa (Vaasa / Vasa)
08 (except 080)	Oulu (Oulu / Uleåborg)
09	Helsinki (Helsinki / Helsingfors)

Source: Finnish Communications Regulatory Authority

== Non-geographic numbers ==
0101–0109; 0201, 02021, 02024–02029, 0203–0208; 029; 0301–0309; 039; 071; 073; 075003–075009, 075303–075309, 075323–075329, 075753–075759, 075983–075989	Business numbers.
04x 050	Mobile telephones.
0100; 0200; 02020, 02022, 02023; 02098, 02099; 0300; 0600; 0700; 075000-075002; 075100–075299; 075300-075302; 075320-075322; 075750-075752; 075980-075982	Service numbers. (0700 series is for entertainment and 0600 is for services). Other premium codes exist and these sometimes confuse consumers as they may not know they are calling a premium number.
0800; 116	Toll-free telephone numbers.
112	Emergency number

== Mobile numbers ==
Finnish mobile numbers start with 04x, 0457 or 050. The format for mobile telephone numbers is 04x 123 45 67 or 0457 123 45 67 or 050 123 45 67. When called from a different country, the format is + 358 4x 123 45 67 or + 358 50 123 45 67. Most commonly 7 digits are used for the subscriber number.

The first three digits previously indicated the mobile operator but mobile number portability has been implemented and any prefix can now be associated with any operator, 040 (was owned by TeliaSonera) and 050 (was owned by Elisa, formerly Radiolinja) are the most common prefixes. 042 and 045 0 were also owned by TeliaSonera, whereas 046 was owned by Elisa. Other major networks are DNA Finland (using then 041, 044 and other numbers in the 045 range) and Saunalahti (using numbers in the 045 range). Former operator codes include 043, which was used in DCS "city phones". Some of these may still be in use. The former NMT network numbers used operator code 049. Most NMT numbers were transferred to GSM numbers with format 04x0 123 456 or 0500 123 456, as there were only 6 digit subscriber numbers in NMT number 358

== Short numbers ==
Upon launching the world's first GSM network in 1991, operator Radiolinja (later merged with Elisa) issued short phone numbers in the format 050 XXXX and 050 XXXXX to their employees and shareholders until the early 2000s. New shareholders purchasing 5000 FIM (about 1101 EUR in 2021) or more worth of shares could request a number. Only 280 four-digit numbers and 6,800 five-digit numbers were issued. Such numbers continue to be in use and can be transferred between operators just like longer numbers.

== International access ==
The default international access code is 00, although when dialing the Telex number, the prefix 99 is required.

When dialing from a mobile phone, + (a plus sign) can be used as a substitute for keying in the international access code.

== See also ==
- Telephone numbers in Åland
