= Telephone numbers in Malta =

- Location of Telephone numbers in Malta (dark green) – in Europe (green & dark grey) – in the European Union (green) – [Legend]
- Country: Malta
- Continent: Europe
- Numbering plan type: closed
- NSN length: 8
- Country code: 356
- International access: 00
- Long-distance: none

In 2001–2002, Malta introduced a new telephone numbering plan, expanding all fixed-line and mobile numbers to eight digits. Previously, fixed-line numbers had six digits, while mobile, mailbox, and pager services used seven-digit numbers.

Telephone numbers in Malta are regulated by the Malta Communications Authority (MCA), the national regulatory authority for the telecommunications sector in Malta. The numbering plan for Malta adheres to the E.164 international numbering standard, allowing communication both domestically and internationally.

Malta utilizes a closed numbering plan, consisting of a country code, an area code, and a subscriber number. The country code for Malta is +356. Following the country code, telephone numbers are typically composed of an area code and a subscriber number.

== Geographic numbering ==
The prefix 21 was added to GO (telecommunications company) fixed line numbers.

        xx xxxx (before 2002, from within Malta)
      21xx xxxx (after 2002, from within Malta)
 +356 21xx xxxx (after 2002, outside Malta)

Melita fixed line numbers have the prefix 27.

Numbers were generally assigned according to locality:

- 22: Valletta, Ħamrun, Marsa
- 23: Floriana, Ħamrun
- 24: Pietà, Malta
- 25: Marsa
- 32: Gżira
- 33: Tas-Sliema, Msida
- 34: Gżira, Msida
- 37: San Ġiljan, Pembroke, San Ġwann
- 38: San Ġwann
- 41: Attard, Għargħur, Iklin, Lija, Mosta, Naxxar
- 42: Lija, Mosta
- 44: Qormi, Balzan, Birkirkara
- 45: Dingli, Mdina, Mtarfa, Rabat, Malta
- 46: Żebbuġ, Malta
- 48: Qormi, Birkirkara
- 49: Qormi
- 52: Mellieħa, Mġarr
- 55: Gozo
- 56: Gozo
- 57: San Pawl il-Baħar
- 63: Marsaskala
- 64: Qrendi, Safi, Zurrieq, Kirkop
- 65: Birżebbuġa, Marsaxlokk
- 66: Żejtun, Vittoriosa, Bormla, Fgura, Għaxaq, Senglea, Kalkara, Luqa, Paola
- 67: Marsaxlokk, Gudja
- 68: Kirkop, Mqabba, Qrendi, Safi
- 69: Bormla
- 80: Żabbar, Vittoriosa, Fgura

== Non-geographic numbering ==
The prefix 9 for seven-digit Epic mobile phone numbers was changed to 99. The prefix 09 for Vodafone mobile phone numbers was changed to 99.

Mobile phone numbers with the prefix 09, which were already eight digits, changed to 99. The digit 0 was to be dialled from outside Malta as well as domestically.

      09xx xxxx (before 2002, from within Malta)
      99xx xxxx (after 2002, from within Malta)
 +356 09xx xxxx (before 2002, outside Malta)
 +356 99xx xxxx (after 2002, outside Malta)

Other non-geographic number ranges also changed, with the prefix for seven-digit mailbox numbers changing from 07 to 217.

          07x xxxx (before 2002, from within Malta)
         217x xxxx (after 2002, from within Malta)
    +356  07x xxxx (before 2002, outside Malta)
    +356 217x xxxx (after 2002, outside Malta)

Similarly, the prefix for pager numbers changed from 70 and 71 to 7117

       70x xxxx (before 2002, from within Malta)
      7117 xxxx (after 2002, from within Malta)
 +356 7117 xxxx (after 2002, outside Malta)

The prefix for Go Mobile is 79

      79xx xxxx (after 2002, from within Malta)
 +356 79xx xxxx (after 2002, outside Malta)

== See also ==
- Telecommunications in Malta
- List of country calling codes
