= Telephone numbers in Moldova =

- Administrative division of Moldova corresponding to geographical numbers prefix division
- Country: Moldova
- Continent: Europe
- Regulator: ANRCETIS
- Numbering plan type: Closed
- NSN length: 8
- Format: 0ABCDEFGH
- Country code: 373
- International access: 00
- Long-distance: 0

On February 1, 2004 Moldova introduced a new telephone numbering plan. The telephone country code is +373, adopted in 1993. Previously, when Moldova was part of the Soviet Union, it used country code 7 and the area code 042.

== Numbering plan ==
Telephone numbers in Moldova are assigned in an closed numbering plan and consist of eight digits. The national significant number (NSN) consists of two or three digits for the national destination code and five or six digits for the subscriber number (SN).

=== National destination code ===
National destination codes are allocated as follows:

| N(S)N Format | Assignment | Number types |
| 1XX | Special service numbers | |
| 2XX | Fixed-line telephony | Geographic |
| 3XX | Fixed-line telephony | Geographic |
| 4XX | Long-term strategic reserve | |
| 5XX | Long-term strategic reserve | |
| 6XX | Mobile telephony | Non-geographic |
| 7XX | Mobile telephony | Non-geographic |
| 8XX | Freephone and shared-cost services | Non-geographic |
| 9XX | Premium services | Non-geographic |

The trunk prefix in Moldova is 0.

=== Area codes ===
List of area codes
| Area Code | Area/City |
|---|---|
| 210 and 310 | Grigoriopol |
| 215 and 315 | Dubăsari |
| 216 and 316 | Camenca |
| 219 and 319 | Dnestrovsc |
| 22 and 32 | Chișinău |
| 230 and 330 | Soroca |
| 231 and 331 | Bălți |
| 235 and 335 | Orhei |
| 236 and 336 | Ungheni |
| 237 and 337 | Strășeni |
| 241 and 341 | Cimișlia |
| 242 and 342 | Ștefan Vodă |
| 243 and 343 | Căușeni |
| 244 and 344 | Călărași |
| 246 and 346 | Edineț |
| 247 and 347 | Briceni |
| 248 and 348 | Criuleni |
| 249 and 349 | Glodeni |
| 250 and 350 | Florești |
| 251 and 351 | Dondușeni |
| 252 and 352 | Drochia |
| 254 and 354 | Rezina |
| 256 and 356 | Rîșcani |
| 258 and 358 | Telenești |
| 259 and 359 | Fălești |
| 262 and 362 | Sîngerei |
| 263 and 363 | Leova |
| 264 and 364 | Nisporeni |
| 265 and 365 | Anenii Noi |
| 268 and 368 | Ialoveni |
| 269 and 369 | Hîncești |
| 271 and 371 | Ocnița |
| 272 and 372 | Șoldănești |
| 273 and 373 | Cantemir |
| 291 and 391 | Ceadîr-Lunga |
| 293 and 393 | Vulcănești |
| 294 and 394 | Taraclia |
| 297 and 397 | Basarabeasca |
| 298 and 398 | Comrat |
| 299 and 399 | Cahul |
| 533 and 433 | Tiraspol |
| 552 and 452 | Bender |
| 555 and 455 | Rîbnița |
| 557 and 457 | Slobozia |

==== Dialling example ====
- 022 xxx xxx or 032 xxx xxx – call within Chișinău
- 0xxx xx xxx – call between other localities in Moldova
- 0xx xxx xxx or 0xxx xx xxx– call between localities and mobile phone companies
