= Telephone numbers in Belarus =

- Country: Belarus
- Continent: Europe
- Regulator: Beltelecom
- NSN length: 9
- Country code: +375
- International access: 8~10
- Long-distance: 8

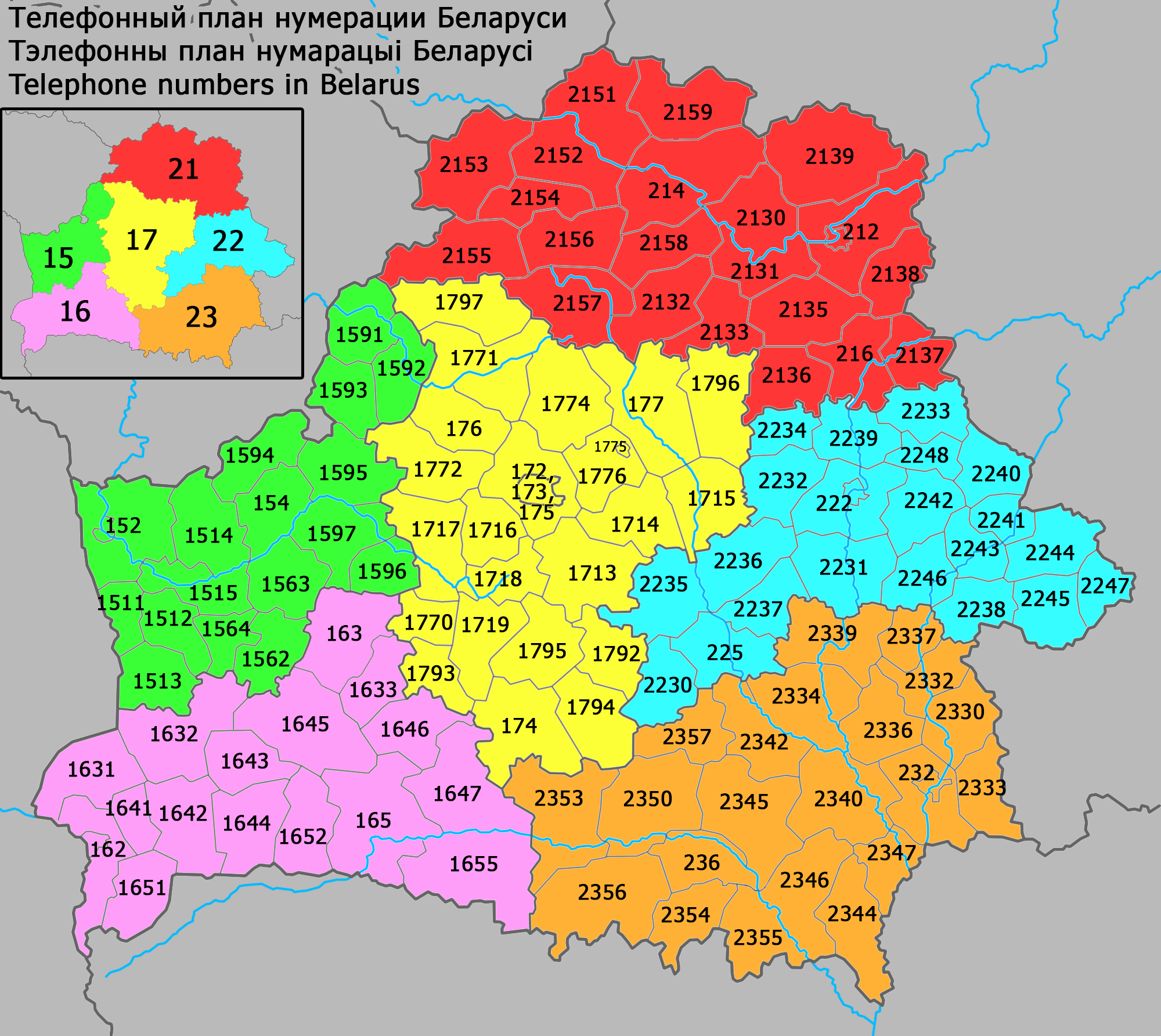
Telephone area codes in Belarus (+375 XXXX12345)

Belarus began using its own country code +375 in 1995, replacing the +7 international country code inherited from the Soviet Union. The local numbering plan was inherited from the Soviet Union and remains with few changes.

Geographic area codes were designed based on previous 3-digit USSR area codes by removing the lead 0. Calling across areas still requires dialing trunk prefix 8 and waiting for dialtone after that. This pause was initially required by the analog trunk switches to identify the caller from PSTN for billing purposes.

When calling within Belarus, the trunk prefix must be followed by 0. In 2003, the abbreviated dialling within a single area code was replaced with a full 9-digit number + 2-digit trunk prefix. Previously it was possible to dial 82RRnn-nnn to reach a number in the same area. Now it is required to dial 80~AARRnn-nnn where AA is the area code, RR is the region code and nn-nnn is the local number.

International calling remains unchanged: 8~10-xxx...xxxx where 8 is a trunk prefix, 10 is the international access code, xxx...xxxx are the digits of the destination country, areas and local number.

== New numbering plan ==
Beltelecom began transition to the international numbering standard similar to the one adapted in many European countries in 2007. March 31, 2007 all short numbers were changed from 2 or 3 digits to 3 digits starting with 1.

Beltelecom plans to change trunk prefix to 0 from current 8~0 and international prefix to 00 from current 8~10.

== Allocation of the area codes ==
13 – Restricted and directory services

14 – Restricted and directory services

15 – Grodno

16 – Brest

17 – Minsk

18 – Restricted and reference services

20 – Digital PSTN 1

21 – Vitebsk

22 – Mogilev

23 – Gomel

24 – Digital PSTN 2

25 – Mobile phone operator life:) Belarus

29 – Mobile phone operators – common code for all mobile phone operators except "Life :)"

33 – Mobile phone operator MTS Belarus

44 – Mobile phone operator A1

== List of area codes in Belarus ==
LIST OF AREA CODES
National (significant) number			Locality	Region
16	3	6D	Baranovichi	Brest
16	43	5D	Bereza	Brest
16	2	6D	Brest	Brest
16	44	5D	Drogichin	Brest
16	46	5D	Gantsevichi	Brest
16	52	5D	Ivanovo	Brest
16	45	5D	Ivatsevichi	Brest
16	31	5D	Kamenets	Brest
16	42	5D	Kobrin	Brest
16	47	5D	Luninets	Brest
16	33	5D	Lyakhovichi	Brest
16	51	5D	Malorita	Brest
16	5	6D	Pinsk	Brest
16	32	5D	Pruzhany	Brest
16	55	5D	Stolin	Brest
16	41	5D	Zhabinka	Brest
23	44	5D	Bragin	Gomel
23	36	5D	Budo-Koshelevo	Gomel
23	32	5D	Chechersk	Gomel
23	33	5D	Dobrush	Gomel
23	2	6D	Gomel	Gomel
23	45	5D	Kalinkovichi	Gomel
23	46	5D	Khoiniki	Gomel
23	37	5D	Korma	Gomel
23	56	5D	Lelchitsy	Gomel
23	47	5D	Loyev	Gomel
23	6	6D	Mozyr (from 2011-03-19)	Gomel
23	55	5D	Narovlya	Gomel
23	57	5D	Oktyabrskiy	Gomel
23	50	5D	Petrikov	Gomel
23	40	5D	Rechitsa	Gomel
23	39	5D	Rogachev	Gomel
23	42	5D	Svetlogorsk	Gomel
23	30	5D	Vetka	Gomel
23	54	5D	Yelsk	Gomel
23	53	5D	Zhitkovichi	Gomel
23	34	5D	Zhlobin	Gomel
15	11	5D	Berestovitsa	Grodno
15	63	5D	Dyatlovo	Grodno
15	2	6D	Grodno	Grodno
15	95	5D	Ivye	Grodno
15	96	5D	Korelichi	Grodno
15	4	6D	Lida (from 2011-01-22)	Grodno
15	15	5D	Mosty	Grodno
15	97	5D	Novogrudok	Grodno
15	93	5D	Oshmyany	Grodno
15	91	5D	Ostrovets	Grodno
15	14	5D	Shchuchin	Grodno
15	62	5D	Slonim	Grodno
15	92	5D	Smorgon	Grodno
15	13	5D	Svisloch	Grodno
15	12	5D	Volkovysk	Grodno
15	94	5D	Voronovo	Grodno
15	64	5D	Zelva	Grodno
17	15	5D	Berezino	Minsk
17	7	6D	Borisov	Minsk
17	14	5D	Cherven	Minsk
17	16	5D	Dzerzhinsk	Minsk
17	93	5D	Kletsk	Minsk
17	19	5D	Kopyl	Minsk
17	96	5D	Krupki	Minsk
17	74	5D	Logoysk	Minsk
17	94	5D	Lyuban	Minsk
17	13	5D	Maryina Gorka	Minsk
17		7D	Minsk	Minsk
17	6	6D	Molodechno	Minsk
17	97	5D	Myadel	Minsk
17	70	5D	Nesvizh	Minsk
17	95	5D	Slutsk	Minsk
17	76	5D	Smolevichi	Minsk
17	4	6D	Soligorsk	Minsk
17	92	5D	Starye Dorogi	Minsk
17	17	5D	Stolbtsy	Minsk
17	18	5D	Uzda	Minsk
17	71	5D	Vileyka	Minsk
17	72	5D	Volozhin	Minsk
17	75	5D	Zhodino	Minsk
22	32	5D	Belynichi	Mogilev
22	5	6D	Bobruysk	Mogilev
22	31	5D	Byhov	Mogilev
22	42	5D	Chausy	Mogilev
22	43	5D	Cherikov	Mogilev
22	48	5D	Dribin	Mogilev
22	30	5D	Glusk	Mogilev
22	33	5D	Gorki	Mogilev
22	47	5D	Khotimsk	Mogilev
22	37	5D	Kirovsk	Mogilev
22	36	5D	Klichev	Mogilev
22	44	5D	Klimovichi	Mogilev
22	45	5D	Kostyukovichi	Mogilev
22	38	5D	Krasnopolye	Mogilev
22	41	5D	Krichev	Mogilev
22	34	5D	Krugloye	Mogilev
22	2	6D	Mogilev	Mogilev
22	40	5D	Mstislavl	Mogilev
22	35	5D	Osipovichi	Mogilev
22	39	5D	Shklov	Mogilev
22	46	5D	Slavgorod	Mogilev
21	31	5D	Beshenkovichi	Vitebsk
21	53	5D	Braslav	Vitebsk
21	33	5D	Chashniki	Vitebsk
21	57	5D	Dokshitsy	Vitebsk
21	37	5D	Dubrovno	Vitebsk
21	56	5D	Glubokoye	Vitebsk
21	39	5D	Gorodok	Vitebsk
21	32	5D	Lepel	Vitebsk
21	38	5D	Liozno	Vitebsk
21	52	5D	Miory	Vitebsk
21	6	6D	Orsha	Vitebsk
21	4	6D	Polotsk	Vitebsk
21	55	5D	Postavy	Vitebsk
21	59	5D	Rossony	Vitebsk
21	35	5D	Senno	Vitebsk
21	54	5D	Sharkovshchina	Vitebsk
21	30	5D	Shumilino	Vitebsk
21	36	5D	Tolochin	Vitebsk
21	58	5D	Ushachi	Vitebsk
21	51	5D	Verhnedvinsk	Vitebsk
21	2	6D	Vitebsk	Vitebsk

== Special trunk numbers ==
All special numbers are dialled with a trunk prefix 8.

600 100 – dial-up Internet access billed on local phone bill

601 – Personal radio communications

604 – Network of Presidential Administration

602 – Audiotext services

606 100 1111 – Prepaid card internet service

800 – Toll-free Direct Call

801 – Toll-free directory services "Green number"

803 – Toll-free surveys

805 – Interactive platform services

810 – Toll surveys

820 – International toll-free service IFS

902 – Toll directory assistance

== Emergency and special services ==
The top 4 numbers are available across areas. Following numbers may be valid for Minsk only and may not exist or have a different short number in other areas.

Some of these numbers were formed by changing from old 2-digit codes to 3 by adding leading 1 or by replacing 0 with 1 in the old 3-digit code.

101 and 112 – Fire brigade

102 – Police

103 – Ambulance

104 – Gas leaks

105, 151, 155 – Railroad station

106 – National airport Minsk-2

107, 116 – Towing services

109 – Local toll directory assistance. Full number for dialling outside the local area it is 99-009-11 in the area centres (cities). Regional directory assistance numbers follow patterns RR-22-222 or RR-21-222 or RR-55-222 where RR is the region code within the area.

114 – Bus station

107, 135, 152 – Taxi

150 – A1 call centre

153 – Area code directory

175 – Currency exchange rates

176 – Interactive platform services

177 – Info service

168 – Minsk information service

169 – Pharmacy inventory and directory

185 – Infoline

188 – Time service

191 – Films on show in cinemas

192 – Night club directory

193 – 24 hour grocery store directory

194 – Horoscope

195 – Weather forecast

196 – Recorded fables

197 – Religious birthdays

The following short numbers in Minsk and other areas were discontinued or replaced with full local numbers:

088 – Time service, changed to 188

067 – Taxi, changed to 135

069 – Pharmacy inventory, changed to 169

053 – Area code directory, changed to 153

Digital PSTN exchanges in Minsk utilizing Touch-Tone dialling support some additional codes:

Flash – Three-way calling

*69 – Call return

== See also ==
- Telecommunications in Belarus#Telephone system
