= Telephone numbers in Argentina =

- Country: Argentina
- Continent: South America
- Regulator: ENACOM
- Numbering plan type: Open
- Country code: 54
- International access: 00
- Long-distance: 0

Telephone numbers In Argentina are administered by the National Communications Entity (ENACOM), the national communications and media regulator, and a public office of Argentina, reporting to the Cabinet of Ministers.

The country's telephone network operates a semi-open numbering plan in which area codes have two, three, or four digits, and directory numbers are six to eight digits long. However, the total number of digits of the national number is always ten.

For example, phone number (11) 1234-5678 for Buenos Aires consists of a two-digit area code and an eight-digit subscriber number, while (383) 123-4567 is an example of a Catamarca number.

== Local dialing ==
Local landline phone numbers in Argentina can have 6, 7 or 8 digits, depending on where they are located:

- Most of Greater Buenos Aires uses 8 digits.
- Second-tier cities use 7 digits.
- Remaining towns and cities use 6 digits.

Local numbers usually begin with a 4, although in recent times numbers having 2, 3, 5, 6, or even 7 and 8 as the first digit are not uncommon.

Thus, for example to call a local number within Buenos Aires, one should dial 1234–5678; within Mar del Plata, 123-4567 and within Villa Carlos Paz, 12–3456. For mobile phone dialing, see the corresponding section below.

=== 2011 changes ===
In March 2011, the National Communications Commission announced changes to be carried out in 21 local areas throughout the country. The reason being the soaring demand in mobile lines causing lines to be nearly depleted in many areas. The changes took place in three stages, starting in November 2011 with the final cities having their numbering plan changed in April 2012. Users in these areas had an extra 4 added in front of their subscriber's numbers as well as having the area code shortened. Thus, they went from a (xxxx) xx-xxxx format to a more resourceful (xxx) xxx-xxxx. On 1 April, seven cities had their numbering changed as described above, thus completing the update process.

== Long-distance dialing ==
To dial a long-distance number in Argentina (whether landline or mobile), the area code must be dialed before the subscriber's number.

As explained before, area codes can have 2, 3 or 4 digits and must be dialed before the local subscriber's phone number.

In addition, to place a domestic long-distance call, trunk code 0 must be dialed as well.

Thus, for example, in order to call a landline phone in Ushuaia from Salta, one should dial: 0 + 2901 + xx-xxxx, where 0 is the trunk code, 2901 is the Ushuaia area code, and xx-xxxx is the local phone number.

The same rule applies to mobile phone numbers, with the addition of the mobile prefix 15 right in front of the local subscriber's number. Using the same example above, to reach a Ushuaia mobile from Córdoba, one should dial: 0 + 2901 + 15 + xx-xxxx

Although trunk code 0 is not part of the long-distance area code, it is normally represented as if it were part of the long-distance prefix. Thus, when given a long-distance number already including a 0 in front of it, no additional 0 is to be added in order to call domestically.

== Mobile phone numbers ==
Mobile phone numbers in Argentina are assigned the same geographic area codes as fixed lines, according to the subscriber's choice or residence, and can be 6, 7 or 8 digits long, just as landline numbers are. The difference with mobile numbers is that a prefix 15, never used for landlines, must be dialed.

Calling a mobile phone locally requires dialing 15, followed by the subscriber's number. For example, to call a Villa Carlos Paz mobile number from Villa Carlos Paz, 15 xx-xxxx must be dialled. To call a mobile phone in a different area code, the area code must be dialed, followed by the mobile prefix 15 and the number. For example, to call a Mar del Plata mobile from Buenos Aires, the dialing pattern is 0 223 15 xxx-xxxx, where 0 is the trunk code, 223 is the Mar del Plata area code, 15 is the mobile prefix, followed by the seven-digit subscriber number.

Here are some examples of mobile phone numbers in Argentina:

- (11) 15 1234–5678 Buenos Aires.
- (380) 15 123–4567 La Rioja.
- (2966) 15 12-3456 Río Gallegos.

The prefix 15 is not part of the number, although users sometimes give out their numbers with the prefix included. This is not a problem when making calls within Argentina, but can cause confusion when the mobile prefix must be omitted, as on IVR menus or when calling from abroad.

Mobile prefix 15 and trunk code 0 can be omitted when calling a mobile from another mobile within Argentina.

Different prefixes are required when calling mobile numbers from outside Argentina.

== Number portability ==
In 2000 President Fernando De La Rúa signed a decree deregulating the telephone service in Argentina, thus allowing number portability to be implemented. In December 2011, Argentine authorities postponed number portability once again—allegedly due to lobbying from operators—until March 2012.

The intention is that users of landline and mobile telephones in Argentina will be able to switch providers while keeping their phone number, so long as they remain in the same subscriber local area."International Union of Local Authorities". Archived from the original on 19 April 2014.

Number portability is expected to bring lower rates and better service quality, since operators will have to carry out additional efforts, both to keep their existing customers from leaving and to attract other operators' users to their networks.

== International calls ==
=== Inbound ===
Inbound international calls to landline numbers are dialed with the appropriate international call prefix, followed by the international country code 54, followed by the area code and the local telephone number.

For example, to call the number (351) 123–4567 in the city of Córdoba from Mexico, the dialing sequence is 00 54 351 123–4567.

Mobile telephone numbers follow a different pattern. The prefix 9 must be added before the area code, leaving out the 15 after the area code, which is only used when calling domestically. The inbound dialing pattern for mobiles is then: +54, 9, area code, mobile subscriber's number. For example, to call mobile number (223) 15 123–4567 (in Mar del Plata) from outside Argentina, the dialling sequence is: +54 9 223 123–4567.

Non-geographic numbers such as 0800 or 0810 cannot be called from outside Argentina. Some companies do not publish their geographic number, and can only be called internationally by obtaining it some other way.

==== Inbound SMS ====
To send an SMS text message to an Argentine cell phone from another country, the 9 used internationally when dialing the number for a voice call (and the 15 used for calls within Argentina) is omitted. For example, if the mobile number in Argentina is (11) 15 1234–5678, a voice call from abroad would be dialled as +54 9 11 1234 5678, but a text message would require +54 11 1234 5678, with +54 9 11 1234 5678 usually being invalid. If a text message is received from Argentina, the reply can be sent to the number displayed as the sender. Not all mobile providers in Argentina have SMS agreements with every carrier in the world, so it may not be possible to send an international SMS.

=== Outbound ===
Outbound international calls use a trunk prefix 00 followed by the international code for the country being called, and then the area code (if any) and local phone number.

For example, to call the number (9) 123–4567 in Auckland, New Zealand, the dialing sequence will be: 00 64 9 123–4567; where 00 is the international trunk code, 64 is the country code for New Zealand, 9 is the Auckland area code, and 123-4567 is the local number.

Although Argentina claims sovereignty over the Falkland Islands, international dialling using the 00 prefix and the country code 500 is required. However, following a court ruling in 2017, calls to the Islands have been charged at domestic rates.

== Collect calls ==
Domestic collect calls are placed by dialing 19 from any landline or payphone; the caller then states their name, which is announced with a message stating that a collect call has been requested when the call is answered. If the called party accepts the reverse charges, the call is connected.

International collect calls are placed by dialling 000 for the international operator; this number also provides international assistance, such as country and area codes, rates, etc.

== Non-geographic numbers ==
Non-geographic numbers have a three-digit prefix followed by a seven-digit number. They are usually represented in the format 0ppp-nnn-nnnn.

Prefixes allocated as of 2013 include:

- 0800: toll-free telephone numbers
- 0810: calls from any area chargeable at local rate
- 0822: toll-free numbers used for calling card access
- 0600: premium-rate telephone numbers
- 0609: premium, fixed-rate gaming numbers
- 0610: dial-up Internet access numbers, usually cheaper than a local call, less frequently used as dial-up Internet access decreased
- 0605: premium-rate telephone numbers for charity donations

== Public utility numbers ==
The format for public utility service phone numbers is mostly 1xx. They can be accessed from any landline, mobile or pay phone within the country.

The most common public utility service numbers are:

- 100: Firefighters
- 101: Police
- 102: Child services
- 103: Civil defense
- 106: Naval Prefecture
- 107: Ambulance
- 110: Phone directory
- 112: Customer service
- 113: Official time
- 114: Phone repair service
- 115: Ring test
- 121: Phone usage info (subject to availability)
- 125: Assistance service for the hearing-impaired
- 911: Emergency (only in cities where 100, 101 and 107 have been merged into one emergency number, such as the Buenos Aires Metro Area and Buenos Aires Province)
