= Telephone numbers in Egypt =

- Country: Egypt
- Continent: Africa
- Regulator: National Telecommunications Regulatory Authority
- Numbering plan type: closed
- Country code: +20
- International access: 00
- Long-distance: 0

20 is the international dialing country code for Egypt. The telephone numbers are designated under the 2003 Telecom Act created by the Egyptian Ministry of Communications and Information Technology.

== Dialing codes ==
=== Land lines ===
Land lines are operated by government-owned Telecom Egypt. The following is a list of dialing codes for the different cities in Egypt.

List of area codes
Area/City	Code	Example (local)	Example (international)	Area/City	Code	Example (local)	Example (international)
Cairo/ Giza/Qalyubia	2 (Note: This code has variations, the Cairo region starts with 2-2xxx-xxxx, the Giza region 2-3xxx-xxxx, and the southern Qalyubia region 2-5xxx-xxxx.)	02-xxxx-xxxx	+20-2-xxxx-xxxx	Alexandria	3	03-xxx-xxxx	+20-3-xxx-xxxx
Arish	68	068-xxx-xxxx	+20-68-xxx-xxxx	Asyut	88	088-xxx-xxxx	+20-88-xxx-xxxx
Aswan	97	097-xxx-xxxx	+20-97-xxx-xxxx	Benha	13	013-xxx-xxxx	+20-13-xxx-xxxx
Beni Suef	82	082-xxx-xxxx	+20-82-xxx-xxxx	Damanhur	45	045-xxx-xxxx	+20-45-xxx-xxxx
Damietta	57	057-xxx-xxxx	+20-57-xxx-xxxx	Faiyum	84	084-xxx-xxxx	+20-84-xxx-xxxx
Ismailia	64	064-xxx-xxxx	+20-64-xxx-xxxx	Kafr El Sheikh	47	047-xxx-xxxx	+20-47-xxx-xxxx
Luxor	95	095-xxx-xxxx	+20-95-xxx-xxxx	Marsa Matruh	46	046-xxx-xxxx	+20-46-xxx-xxxx
Mansoura	50	050-xxx-xxxx	+20-50-xxx-xxxx	Minya	86	086-xxx-xxxx	+20-86-xxx-xxxx
Monufia (Shibin El Kom)	48	048-xxx-xxxx	+20-48-xxx-xxxx	New Valley	92	092-xxx-xxxx	+20-92-xxx-xxxx
Port Said	66	066-xxx-xxxx	+20-66-xxx-xxxx	Qena	96	096-xxx-xxxx	+20-96-xxx-xxxx
Red Sea	65	065-xxx-xxxx	+20-65-xxx-xxxx	Sohag	93	093-xxx-xxxx	+20-93-xxx-xxxx
Suez	62	062-xxx-xxxx	+20-62-xxx-xxxx	Gharbia	40	040-xxx-xxxx	+20-40-xxx-xxxx
El Tor	69	069-xxx-xxxx	+20-69-xxx-xxxx	Zagazig	55	055-xxx-xxxx	+20-55-xxx-xxxx
10th of Ramadan	15, 554	015-xxx-xxxx, 0554-xxx-xxx	+20-15-xxx-xxxx, +20-554-xxx-xxx	Benha	13	013-xxx-xxxx	+20-13-xxx-xxxx

=== Mobile phone numbers ===
There are currently four mobile network operators in Egypt, and they are, from oldest to newest: Orange, Vodafone, Etisalat, and We. The following is a list of mobile number dialing codes.

Operator	Code	Example (local)	Example (international)
Vodafone	10	010-xxxx-xxxx	+20-10-xxxx-xxxx
Etisalat	11	011-xxxx-xxxx	+20-11-xxxx-xxxx
Orange	12	012-xxxx-xxxx	+20-12-xxxx-xxxx
We	15	015-xxxx-xxxx	+20-15-xxxx-xxxx

=== Emergency phone numbers ===
Egypt has a number of emergency phone numbers including:

- Police: 122 (or 112 on mobile)
- Ambulance: 123
- Fire brigade: 180

The country also operates miscellaneous emergency numbers including:

Number	Service	Description
121	Electrical inquires	
129	Petrogas	Used if there is a problem with natural gas supply.
125	Water complaints	Used if there is an issue with water supply
175	Sanitation	
115	Citizens' reports	Used when reporting about illegal possession of weapons, drugs, and antiquities.
128	Ministry of Interior Security	Used to inquire the services of the Ministry
13	Security Directorate	
126	Tourism Police	Used instead of the regular 122 emergency number to report crimes related to tourism (e.g. pickpockets at beaches and the Pyramids)
145	Railway Police	Used in place of 122 to report crimes across the railway system
108	Cybercrime	Used to report cyber crimes such as mass hacking of governmental websites

=== Hotlines ===
Hotlines are alternative numbers used in place of telephone numbers as a means of dialing a service. Hotlines are usually five digits long and are displayed in advertising and menus. Hotlines starts with numbers described below. An example of a hotline is 16789 reserved for Egypt Post. Other examples of hotlines include:

- Information Crimes: 15008
- Consumer Protection: 19588
- Save the Homeless: 16439
- Papa John's Pizza: 19277
- Hardee's: 19066
- McDonald's: 19991
- Allianz: 19909
- Hyundai: 16661
- Pizza Hut: 19000

=== List of other codes ===
This is a list of other miscellaneous codes used in Egypt.

Description	Number format
Toll free	0800-xxx-xxxx
Premium services	09xx-xxxx
Free internet dial up	07xx-xxxx
Short numbers (hotlines)	15xxx, 16xxx, 17xxx, 19xxx
