= Telephone numbers in Slovenia =

Location
- Country: Slovenia
- Continent: Europe

Access codes
- Country code: +386
- International access: 00
- Long-distance: 0

Slovenia received a new country code following the breakup of the Socialist Federal Republic of Yugoslavia in 1991 (which previously had +38 as country code). Additionally, the Ipko mobile phone company in Kosovo used the +386 country code.

== Number length ==
All telephone numbers are 9 digits long (trunk prefix, 0, plus eight numbers). The first one, two, or three digits after the trunk prefix are the area code. The possible formats are: (0x) xxx xx xx, (0xx) xxx xxx, and (0xxx) xx xxx.

Originally, there was only one provider of landline telephony, Telekom Slovenije.

When making a call within the same landline area (Telekom), the area code is omitted. If a number has been transferred to another operator (e.g. T-2), it can still be reached without the area code; but to call from a transferred number, the area code must be dialed in all cases. Examples:

- 01 xxx xx xx (Telekom) to 01 xxx xx xx (Telekom) dials xxx xx xx
- 01 xxx xx xx (Telekom) to 01 xxx xx xx (T-2) dials xxx xx xx
- 01 xxx xx xx (T-2) to 01 xxx xx xx (Telekom or T-2) dials 01 xxx xx xx.

This does not apply for mobile phone numbers and VoIP numbers, where the area code must always be dialed.

== Example for calling ==
The international call prefix depends on the country you are calling from; e.g., 00 for most European countries, and 011 from North America. For domestic calls (within the country), 0 must be dialed before the area code. The prefix for international calls from Slovenia is 00 (e.g., for a United States number 00 1 ... should be dialled).

An example for calling telephones in Ljubljana is as follows:

- xxx xx xx (within Ljubljana)
- 01 xxx xx xx (within Slovenia)
- +386 1 xxx xx xx (outside Slovenia)

== List of area codes ==
The list of areas, grouped into historic and geographic larger regions:

No.	Area^{1}	Code
Landlines^{2}
1.	Ljubljana	01
2.	Maribor, Murska Sobota, Ravne na Koroškem	02
3.	Celje, Trbovlje	03
4.	Kranj	04
5.	Koper, Postojna, Nova Gorica	05
6.	Novo Mesto, Krško	07
Mobile phone numbers^{2}
7.	A1 (including Bob, HoT – Hofer Telekom, Ventocom)	030, 040, 068, 069
8.	Telekom Slovenije (including Izimobil, Spar Mobil, Hip Mobil, SoftNET Mobil)	031, 041, 051, 065
9.	Telemach	070, 071
10.	T-2	064
11.	Mega M	065
VoIP^{2}
11.	Various providers	059 (Telekom Slovenije), 081, 082, 083 (Telemach)
Special numbers^{3}
12.	Toll free numbers	080
13.	Televoting	089
14.	Commercial numbers	090
15.	Fire brigade, ambulance, civil protection	112
16.	Police	113

^{1}Prior to 2000, the area codes were as follows: Ljubljana – 061, Trbovlje – 0601, Maribor – 062, Ravne na Koroškem – 0602, Celje – 063, Kranj – 064, Nova Gorica – 065, Koper – 066, Postojna – 067, Novo Mesto – 068, Krško – 0608, Murska Sobota – 069.

^{2} Calling codes in the table are assigned to new customers by the respective provider. However, it has been possible to change the operator and retain the old calling code (along with the rest of the phone number) since 2006. Calling codes do not necessary reflect the operator, but it is not possible to transfer a mobile number to a land-based operator and vice versa.

^{3} Until 31 December 1996, the emergency numbers were: Police – 92, Fire brigade – 93, Ambulance – 94, Civil protection – 985.

== See also ==
- Telecommunications in Slovenia
