= Trunk prefix =

Telecommunications technology

A trunk prefix is a digit sequence to be dialed before a telephone number to initiate a telephone call for the purpose of selecting an appropriate telecommunication circuit by which the call is to be routed.

== Methodology ==
Telecommunication networks evolved from small, locally designed and managed networks within a city, region, state, province, etc. and grew by geographic expansion and the desire to communicate across the boundaries of such networks. For this purpose special trunks became available by which calls are routed for interconnection of different networks. The telephone numbering plans were typically incompatible with those in other networks. Telephone companies enabled the routing via external trunks to other networks by requiring operators or subscribers to dial special prefix sequences prior to dialing the destination telephone number.

Before the implementation of direct distance dialing (DDD) in the United States, operators used routing codes to select specific trunks to the next intermediate destination, or, in Operator Toll Dialing, an area code to forward the call to a remote numbering plan area toll switch. In Direct Distance Dialing the newest local (Class 5) switching systems did not require special prefixes in addition to the area code, but older systems were retrofitted with equipment that enabled a toll trunk by dialing a special prefix sequence.

Today, making a domestic (national) telephone call usually requires the dialing of a single or two-digit national trunk prefix preceding any area codes and the destination subscriber number. In most countries, the trunk prefix is 0.

For international telephone calls the caller must dial an international trunk prefix, followed by the destination's country code. Many mobile telephone systems also permit dialing the character + in place of the International trunk prefix to automatically substitute the appropriate code for the origination country.

For displaying an international telephone number in directories, business cards, or stationery, a telephone number is represented by prefixing it with a plus sign and the country code, without any local trunk prefixes.

== Countries using national trunk prefixes ==
=== Countries that use 0 as national trunk prefix ===
==== Africa ====
- Egypt
- Morocco
- Kenya
- South Africa
- Sudan
- Tanzania
- Rwanda
- Nigeria
- Libya
- Angola

==== South America ====
- Argentina
- Brazil
- Paraguay
- Peru
- Venezuela

==== Asia ====
- Afghanistan
- Azerbaijan
- Bangladesh
- Cambodia
- China (landlines only)
- India (landlines only)
- Indonesia
- Iran
- Israel
- Japan
- Jordan
- Laos
- Malaysia
- Myanmar
- North Korea
- Nepal
- Pakistan
- Philippines
- Saudi Arabia
- South Korea
- Sri Lanka
- Taiwan
- Thailand
- Uzbekistan
- Vietnam
- United Arab Emirates

==== Europe ====
- Albania
- Austria
- Belgium
- Bosnia and Herzegovina
- Bulgaria
- Croatia
- Finland
- France
- Georgia
- Germany
- Ireland
- Lithuania
- Moldova
- Montenegro
- Netherlands
- North Macedonia
- Romania
- Serbia
- Slovakia
- Slovenia
- Sweden
- Switzerland
- Turkey
- Ukraine
- United Kingdom

==== Oceania ====
- Australia
- New Zealand

=== Countries that use 8 as national trunk prefix ===
- Belarus
- Kazakhstan
- Russia (change to 0 planned)
- Turkmenistan

=== Countries that use other trunk prefixes ===
The number next to a country denotes its national trunk prefix.

- Mexico – 01
- Mongolia – 01 or 02
- Hungary – 06
- North American Numbering Plan countries – 1

== Countries that no longer use a national trunk prefix ==
- Bolivia
- Chile
- Cyprus
- Czech Republic
- Denmark
- Estonia
- Greece — the prefix 0 was replaced by 2 for landlines and 6 for mobile phone numbers, which are now part of the number
- Italy — the leading 0 is dialed both within and from outside Italy, because 0 is now part of the number and not the trunk code
- Latvia
- Luxembourg
- Malta
- Monaco
- Nepal
- Norway
- Oman
- Poland
- Portugal
- San Marino — the leading 0 is dialed both within and from outside Italy, because 0 is now part of the number and not the trunk code
- Spain
- Uruguay
- Vatican City — the leading 0 is dialed both within and from outside Italy, because 0 is now part of the number and not the trunk code
- Singapore

== See also ==
- Subscriber trunk dialling
