= Telephone numbers in the Czech Republic =

Telephone numbers in Czech Republic
- Country: Czech Republic
- Continent: Europe
- Numbering plan type: Closed
- Format: xxx xxx xxx
- Country code: +420
- International access: 00
- Long-distance: none

Following the break-up of Czechoslovakia in 1993, the successor states, the Czech Republic and Slovakia, continued to share the 42 country code until 28 February 1997, with the Czech Republic then adopting 420 and Slovakia adopting 421.

On September 22, 2002, the Czech Republic adopted a closed numbering plan, with nine-digit numbers used for local and national calls, and the dropping of the trunk code 0.

Before the change, the following arrangements would have been made for calls to Brno:

Local call:         xx xx xx xx
National call:      05/xx xx xx xx
International call: +420 5 xx xx xx xx

After the change, the dialing arrangements for calls to Brno were as follows:

Within Czech Republic:  5xx xxx xxx
Outside Czech Republic: +420 5xx xxx xxx

In the case of mobile numbers, which had to be dialed in full, the only change was that the 0 was no longer used:

Within Czech Republic:  602 xxx xxx 
Outside Czech Republic: +420 602 xxx xxx

== Emergency calls (always toll-free) ==
- General emergency: 112
- Ambulance: 155
- Police: 158
- Fire brigade: 150
- Municipal police: 156
- Mountain rescue service: 1210

Other Emergency Numbers:

- Urgent gas leak: 1239
- Emergency Road Service (ABA): 1240
- Emergency Road Service (ÚAMK): 1230

== Services Numbers ==
O2 offers several over-the-phone information services for a fee. Note that many of the services are offered only in Czech:

- Info Line (Czech Number Directory): 1180
- Info Line (Foreign Number Directory): 1181
- Operator for changed numbers (re-numbering): 141 11
- Information on air quality: 141 10
- Exact time: 141 12
- Weather: 141 16
- Medical Information: 141 20
- Operator for international phone calls: 133 003

== Prefixes ==
The first 1–3 digits (after +420) of the telephone number indicates location or network. For mobile phones, since there is number portability, the mobile phone code only indicates the original operator. For example, when a person calls a number starting with 73 (T-Mobile) but had been ported to another operator, a short voice message in Czech and English is played stating "you are calling out of a T-Mobile network" before the ringing tone. It is possible to disable this voice message.

=== Geographical ===
calling codes	region	former codes
2	Prague	02
31, 32	Central Bohemian Region	
35	Karlovy Vary Region	017 Karlovy Vary
37	Plzeň Region	019 Plzeň
38, 39	South Bohemian Region	038 České Budějovice
41, 47	Ústí nad Labem Region	047 Ústí nad Labem
46	Pardubice Region	040 Pardubice
48	Liberec Region	048 Liberec
49	Hradec Králové Region	049 Hradec Králové
51, 53, 54	South Moravian Region	05 Brno
55, 59	Moravian-Silesian Region	069 Ostrava
56	Vysočina Region	066 Jihlava
57	Zlín Region	067 Zlín
58	Olomouc Region	068 Olomouc

=== Mobile networks ===
  601 xxx xxx
  602 xxx xxx
  603 xxx xxx
  604 xxx xxx
  605 xxx xxx
  606 xxx xxx
  607 xxx xxx
  608 xxx xxx
  702 xxx xxx
  703 xxx xxx
  704 xxx xxx
  705 xxx xxx
  72x xxx xxx
  73x xxx xxx
  77x xxx xxx
  790 xxx xxx
  791 xxx xxx
  792 xxx xxx
  793 xxx xxx
  794 xxx xxx
  795 xxx xxx
  797 xxx xxx
  799 xxx xxx

- 601 – O2 Czech Republic (formerly NMT, numbers were ported to GSM in 2006; also used as part of the PPP log-in when dialling in the CDMA network) (formerly named EuroTel)
- 602 – O2 Czech Republic (GSM system)
- 603 – T-Mobile Czech Republic
- 604 – T-Mobile Czech Republic
- 605 – T-Mobile Czech Republic
- 606 – O2 Czech Republic
- 607 – O2 Czech Republic
- 608 – Vodafone Czech Republic (formerly named Oskar)
- 70 – (formerly Bleskmobil's range)
- 72 – O2 Czech Republic
- 73 – T-Mobile Czech Republic
- 77 – Vodafone Czech Republic
- 790 – O2 Czech Republic

=== Non-geographic networks ===
- 910 – VoIP

=== Institutional networks ===
These prefixes belong to the following networks:

- 9522 – Všeobecná zdravotní pojišťovna, government-controlled health insurance company
- 9555 – Bank "Komerční banka (KB)", a part of the Société Générale (SG) international group, formerly government-controlled company
- 9567 – Bank "Česká spořitelna (ČS)", a part of the Erste Bank Group, formerly government-controlled company
- 972 – Czech Railways and Railway Administration
- 973 – Ministry of Defence & Armed Forces of the Czech Republic
- 974 – Ministry of the Interior

=== Special pricing ===
- 800 – Zelená linka ("Green line") – toll-free (800 00 – Home Country Direct)
- 844 (also 81, 83, 843, 845, 846, 855) – Modrá linka (Blue line) – local call tariff from all Czech landlines
- 840 (also 841, 842, 847, 848, 849) – Bílá linka (White line) – national call tariff from all Czech landlines
- 90 – premium tariff
- 971 – dial-up internet access
- 976 xx – premium-priced dial-up internet access (priced at CZK xx per minute)
