= Telephone numbers in Hungary =

- Country: Hungary
- Continent: Europe
- Numbering plan type: open
- NSN length: 8 or 9
- Format: (06 1) xxx xxxx / (06 xx) xxx xxx (geographic); 06 xx xxx xxxx (mobile)
- Country code: 36
- International access: 00
- Long-distance: 06

Telephone numbers in Hungary for landlines consists of six numerals except those in Budapest which have seven numerals, as do mobile numbers. Before keying the subscriber number required, a caller may need to enter a domestic code (06) and an area code.

== Hungary area codes ==
In Hungary the standard lengths for area codes is two, except for Budapest (the capital), which has the area code 1. Landline numbers are six digits in general; numbers in Budapest and mobile numbers are seven digits.

== Making calls within and from Hungary ==
Calls within local areas can be made by dialling the number without the area code, such as 123 4567 in Budapest or 123 456 in other areas. However, this is not permitted in mobile phone networks.

Domestic calls to all other area codes must be preceded with 06 + area code. For example, a call from Budapest to Monor (area code 29) would be made as 06 29 123 456 and a call from Monor to Budapest (area code 1) would be made as 06 1 234 5678. When using mobile phones, the international format can be used instead: +36 1 234 5678.

Calls to international destinations are in the format 00 + country code + number. On mobile phones, + can be used instead of 00.

== Making calls from abroad ==
Calls to local areas from abroad can be made using the international prefix + country code + area code. The national trunk code 06 used inside Hungary shall not be dialed from abroad. For example, a call to Monor (area code 29) would be made as +36 29 123 456 or (if calling from a country where the international prefix is 00) 00 36 29 123 456, where the +36 or the 0036 prefixes represent the country code of Hungary.

== Short numbers ==
Certain services can be called with a short number, ignoring the above scheme.

- 112 - Emergency number (ambulance, fire brigade, police)
- 104 - Ambulance
- 105 - Fire Brigade
- 107 - Police
- 143 - Telephone fault reporting
- 180 - Time service
- 188 - Roadside assistance
- 193 - Alarm service
- 197 - Yellow Pages directory assistance
- 198 - National directory assistance
- 199 - International directory assistance
- 1830 - Medical on call service (non-emergency ambulance)
- 116000 - Hotlines for missing children

== Area codes ==
- 1 – Budapest
- 20 – mobile network of Yettel
- 21 – Location independent electronic communications service numbers
- 22 – Székesfehérvár
- 23 – Biatorbágy
- 24 – Szigetszentmiklós
- 25 – Dunaújváros
- 26 – Szentendre
- 27 – Vác
- 28 – Gödöllő
- 29 – Monor
- 30 – mobile network of Magyar Telekom
- 31 – formerly UPC Mobil and several smaller mobile services now merged to One HU
- 32 – Salgótarján
- 33 – Esztergom
- 34 – Tatabánya
- 35 – Balassagyarmat
- 36 – Eger
- 37 – Gyöngyös
- 38 – corporate networks
- 40 – retired (previously shared-cost service)
- 41 – retired (previously special services)
- 42 – Nyíregyháza
- 44 – Mátészalka
- 45 – Kisvárda
- 46 – Miskolc
- 47 – Szerencs
- 48 – Ózd
- 49 – Mezőkövesd
- 50 – Mobile network formerly Digi.Mobil now One HU
- 51 – ADSL/DSL internet services
- 52 – Debrecen
- 53 – Cegléd
- 54 – Berettyóújfalu
- 55 - Test number
- 56 – Szolnok
- 57 - Jászberény
- 59 – Karcag
- 60 – reserved/retired - former Westel 0660 mobile network on 450 MHz
- 61 – reserved for later use
- 62 – Szeged
- 63 – Szentes
- 66 – Békéscsaba
- 68 – Orosháza
- 69 – Mohács
- 70 – mobile network of One HU
- 71 – M2M
- 72 – Pécs
- 73 – Szigetvár
- 74 – Szekszárd
- 75 – Paks
- 76 – Kecskemét
- 77 – Kiskunhalas
- 78 – Kiskőrös
- 79 – Baja
- 80 – toll-free numbers (national)
- 81 – retired - previously: IN
- 82 – Kaposvár
- 83 – Keszthely
- 84 – Siófok
- 85 – Marcali
- 87 – Tapolca
- 88 – Veszprém
- 89 – Pápa
- 90 – Premium-rate service (national)
- 91 – Premium-rate service (national) - previously: IP VPN
- 92 – Zalaegerszeg
- 93 – Nagykanizsa
- 94 – Szombathely
- 95 – Sárvár
- 96 – Győr
- 99 – Sopron

== Mobile phone codes ==
In ascending numeric order

Mobile Providers with own Networks
Provider	Code
Yettel HU	20
Telekom HU	30
UPC Mobil and several other providers	31
Digi.Mobil HU (One HU)	50
One HU	70

Note: After 1 April 2004, the phone numbers can be carried from network to network. That means any of the previous codes can refer to any mobile provider.
