= Telephone numbers in Ukraine =

- Location of Ukraine
- Country: Ukraine
- Continent: Europe
- Regulator: Ministry of Infrastructure
- NSN length: 9
- Format: (xx) xxx xxxx (xxx) xx xxxx (xxxx) xxxxx
- Country code: 380
- International access: 00
- Long-distance: 0

Telephone numbers in Ukraine are administered by the Ministry of Infrastructure.

The country last enacted a telephone numbering plan in 2009. National telephone numbers consist of a two-digit zone code, an optional sub-zone code, an optional filler (zero to two "2"'s), and the local telephone number (five to seven digits). Following the 2022 Russian invasion of Ukraine, the regions of Crimea, Donetsk, and Luhansk were assigned Russian telephone prefixes by the Russian occupation administration.

== 2009 plan ==
On 14 October 2009, Ukraine switched to numbering conventions common in the European Union.

Calling nationwide requires dialing 0, followed by the region code, preceding the local number. For instance, to call Kyiv from Odesa, users dial 0 44 xxx xxxx. The same convention was adopted for mobile operators.

For local calls, users may dial the local number without the prefixes. Mobile users must dial the full 0-prefixed number, although operators may implement local dialing in cities.

The in-country sequence for ordinary zones consists of a two-digit zone code, an optional subzone code (never used for the capital of the geographic region corresponding to a phone zone), an optional filler (0 to 2 "2"s, used to make the whole in-country sequence contain exactly 9 digits) and the local phone number (5 to 7 digits). When dialing from cell phones, the in-country dial sequence (with the 0 XX prefix) is used even for phones of the same provider. Otherwise a call may be placed in the nearest geographic area.

Area codes correspond to geographic regions ("oblasts") with exception of Kyiv and formerly Sevastopol which utilize their own area code.

Cell phone numbers can be assigned both within the cell phone provider zone and within a geographic zone. The latter arrangement is used mainly for CDMA phones and for GSM operators selling their connectivity within one city, like GoldenTelecom GSM. Allocation of new GSM cell phone numbers within a geographic zone is very rare now because law requires all incoming calls to be free, including incoming calls to a cell phone.

Law explicitly prohibits trunk calls to a PSTN phone within the same local area in a geographic service zone (e.g. from Kyiv to Kyiv), so one cannot dial 0~2 or 0~xx for this, unless the phone exchange is misconfigured or a special circumstance occurs.

The switch to a closed numbering plan, which will introduce seven digit-long numbers for all zones, should be complete in 2011-2012.

To place an international call, users dial 00 before the ITU country code. For instance, to call Vancouver, Canada, from Kyiv, users dial 00 1 604 xxx xxxx.

== Previous dialing plan ==
Ukraine (similarly to most of ex-Soviet Union countries) used to have a four-level (local, zone, country, international) open dialing plan. For all non-local numbers, the required trunk prefix was '8' followed by an auxiliary dial tone after it (optional on digital exchanges), with the following '2' for in-zone calls, followed by an area code, and '10' for international calls.

== Russian invasion ==
Following the 2014 Russian invasion of Ukraine, the Russian-occupied regions of the Republic of Crimea and the Federal City of Sevastopol were issued with the Russian telephone codes +7 352 and +7 869 respectively by the Russian authorities.

Following the 2022 Russian invasion of Ukraine, the Russian-occupied parts of the Donetsk and Luhansk regions were issued with the Russian telephone area codes of 856, 949 and 857, 959 respectively. Whilst the Kherson and Zaporizhzhia Oblasts were considered annexed into the Russian Federation by Russia, these regions were not given area codes that are part of the Russian telephone numbering plan. They currently use Russian and/or Ukrainian cellular phone numbers and/or the existing Ukrainian fixed area codes. Whilst the situation ever changes on the ground the exact usage of phone numbers in these areas thus varies.

== See also ==
- List of dialling codes in Ukraine
