= Telephone numbers in North Macedonia =

- Location of North Macedonia (dark green)
- Country: North Macedonia
- Continent: Europe
- Regulator: AEK
- Numbering plan type: Closed
- NSN length: 8
- Format: (02) xxxxxxx (Skopje) (0xx) xxxxxx (rest of North Macedonia); 07x xxxxxx (mobiles)
- Country code: +389
- International access: 00
- Long-distance: 0

North Macedonia's telephone numbering plan is the system used for assigning telephone numbers in North Macedonia. It is regulated by the Agency for Electronic Communications (AEK), which holds responsibility for telecommunications.

The country calling code of North Macedonia is +389. Area codes should always be dialed, even within the country, because of the many fixed and mobile operators.

An example for calling telephones in Skopje is as follows:

- 02 xxxxxxx (within Skopje)
- 02 xxxxxxx (within North Macedonia)
- +389 2 xxxxxxx (outside North Macedonia)

Numbering formats for North Macedonia:

+389 2 xxxxxxx geographic numbers – Skopje
+389 3x xxxxxx geographic numbers – eastern area
+389 4x xxxxxx geographic numbers – central and western area
+389 5xx xxxxx premium, value added, shared revenue
+389 7x xxxxxx mobile
+389 8xx xxxxx freephone, shared cost

1xx is the general short code format (such as 112 for emergency); 10xx format is for carrier access.

The international call prefix depends on the country you are calling from, e.g. 00 for most European countries, and 011 from America. For domestic calls (within the country), 0 must be dialed before the area code.

For calls from North Macedonia, the prefix for international calls is 00 (e.g. for calling a United States number, 00 1 ... should be dialed).

== Landline area codes ==
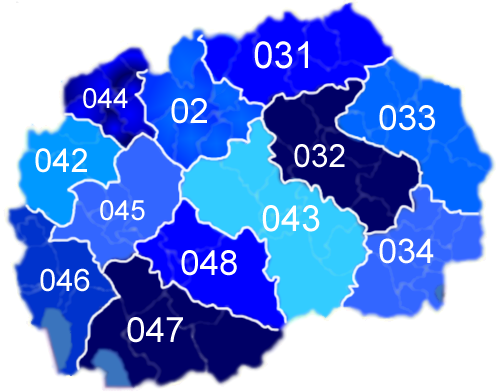

Network group	Code	Municipalities covered by code
Skopje	2	Greater Skopje: (Aerodrom, Centar, Saraj, Kisela voda, Gazi Baba, Butel, Šuto Orizari, Karpoš, Čair, Gorče Petrov), Aračinovo, Čučer-Sandevo, Ilinden, Petrovec, Sopište, Studeničani, Zelenikovo
Kumanovo	31	Kumanovo, Lipkovo, Kratovo, Kriva palanka, Rankovce, Staro Nagoričane
Štip	32	Štip, Probištip, Radoviš, Sveti Nikole, Konče, Karbinci, Lozovo
Kočani	33	Kočani, Berovo, Pehčevo, Vinica, Makedonska Kamenica, Zrnovci, Češinovo-Obleševo
Strumica	34	Strumica, Valandovo, Vasilevo, Bosilovo, Novo Selo, Dojran, Bogdanci, Gevgelija
Gostivar	42	Gostivar, Mavrovo and Rostuša, Vrapčište
Veles	43	Veles, Kavadarci, Negotino, Čaška, Gradsko, Rosoman
Tetovo	44	Tetovo, Jegunovce, Bogovinje, Brvenica, Tearce, Želino
Kičevo	45	Kičevo, Makedonski Brod, Plasnica
Ohrid	46	Ohrid, Struga, Vevčani, Debarca, Debar, Centar Župa
Bitola	47	Bitola, Resen, Novaci, Mogila, Demir Hisar
Prilep	48	Prilep, Kruševo, Krivogaštani, Dolneni

== Mobile phone number codes ==
Code	Mobile network
070,071,072	Makedonski Telekom
073	GreenMobile,mtel
074	Telekabel
075,076,077,078	A1 Macedonia
079	LycaMobile (acquired by mtel)

Users can switch carriers and keep their cell phone numbers, including prefix.

== Special service numbers ==
Number	Service
112	General emergency
192	Police
193	Fire brigade
194	Ambulance
195	Crisis Management Center
196	Roadside Assistance (AMSM)
13-112	Mountain Rescue
1188	information service-Yellow Pages Macedonia
188	information service-Makedonski Telekom

== Numbering plan under the former Yugoslavia ==
During Yugoslavia's existence, Macedonian area codes all began with 9. On 1 October 1993, North Macedonia was split from the +38 code and the 9 from the area codes was integrated into the country code. Between 2000 and 2001, the 9 in the area codes was generally changed to either 3 or 4. The area codes for Skopje were changed from (091) to (02). In 2003, all Skopje phone numbers were changed from 6 to 7 digits by having an extra digit added to the front of the original number, meaning that (for example) the Yugoslavian number +38 91 123456 became +389 91 123456 in 1993, then +389 2 3123456. When the extra 3 was added to the beginning of Skopje numbers, new 30x and 39x exchanges became available.

== See also ==
- Telecommunications in North Macedonia
- Makedonski Telekom
