= Telephone numbers in Kazakhstan =

- Location of Kazakhstan
- Country: Kazakhstan
- Continent: Asia
- Regulator: Ministry of Transport and Communications of the Republic of Kazakhstan
- NSN length: 10
- Format: (0xx) xxx xx xx (6xx) xxx xx xx (7xx) xxx xx xx
- Country code: 7
- International access: 8~10
- Long-distance: 8~

Telephone numbers in Kazakhstan are regulated by the Telecommunications Committee of the Ministry of Digital Development, Innovations, and Aerospace Industry in the Republic of Kazakhstan, and administered by telecommunication providers, such as Kazakhtelecom, a state-backed and the largest national operator.

Kazakhstan shares country code 7 with Russia since its independence in 1991. In 2021, ITU reserved the code 997 for Kazakhstan. While the country planned to activate it by January 2023, it was decided to keep country code 7.

== Country code ==
Kazakhstan is a member of the International Telecommunication Union (ITU), and has been using the ITU-assigned country code 7 jointly with Russia in an integrated numbering plan since the breakup of the Soviet Union. In 2021, ITU reserved country code 997 for Kazakhstan, which the government planned to activate on 1 January 2023 with a two-year period of permissive dialling for the former code 7. The plan was abandoned in November 2023, when it was reported that Kazakhstan instead had been working on a new code-sharing agreement with Russia.

== Numbering plan ==
Under an agreement with Russia signed on 11 June 2006, Kazakhstan was assigned zone codes 6xx and 7xx (x = 0 to 9) in the integrated numbering plan with ITU country code 7.

=== Geographical numbers ===
Geographical (landline) telephone numbers in Kazakhstan consist of ten digits:

- zone code: the leading three digits
- area code: the following one or two digits
- subscriber number: the last six or five digits, depending on the length of the area code.

Geographic numbers use zone codes in the range from 710 to 729. Prior to the 2006 agreement, landlines used zone codes in the 3xx range; as zone codes 3xx were assigned to Russia, zone codes in Kazakhstan were changed by substituting the leading 3 with 7 in mid-2007.

List of zone codes
Zone code	Region
710	Karaganda Region
711	West Kazakhstan Region
712	Atyrau Region
713	Aktobe Region
714	Kostanay Region
715	North Kazakhstan Region
716	Akmola Region
717	Astana
718	Pavlodar Region
721	Karaganda Region
722	East Kazakhstan Region
723	East Kazakhstan Region
724	Kyzylorda Region
725	Shymkent
725	Turkistan Region
726	Jambyl Region
727	Almaty
727	Almaty Region
728	Almaty Region
729	Mangystau Region

=== Non-geographical numbers ===
Non-geographical numbers start with 75x or 76x.

=== Mobile numbers ===
Mobile numbers have 10 digits starting with 70x or 77x.

== Dialling procedures ==
=== Local and national dialling ===
Calls within a single area code can be made by dialling the seven-digit subscriber number alone. For long-distance calls, callers from landline numbers dial the long-distance prefix 8, wait for a tone, and then dial the zone code and number. Modern exchanges no longer require waiting for the tone, nor does mobile telephony where the long-distance prefix is not required.

=== International dialling ===
The international dialling prefix is 8~10 – callers dial 8, wait for a tone, and then dial 10 immediately followed by the country code and the remainder of the number. Modern exchanges no longer require waiting for the tone.

== See also ==
- Telephone numbers in Russia
