= Telephone numbers in Norway =

- Location of the Kingdom of Norway in dark green
- Country: Norway
- Continent: Europe
- Regulator: Norwegian Post and Telecommunications Authority
- Numbering plan type: Closed
- NSN length: 5 (special fixed); 8 (mobile & fixed); 12 (mobile M2M/IoT communication)
- Format: 0xxxx (special fixed) xx xx xx xx (fixed) xxx xx xxx (mobile) xx xx xx xx xx xx (mobile M2M/IoT communication)
- Numbering plan: The Norwegian phone number plan
- Last updated: 04 May 2022
- Country code: +47
- International access: 00
- Long-distance: none

Telephone numbers in Norway have the country code "+47" and up to the first 2 digits of the phone number will indicate its geographic area. Emergency services are 3 digits long and start with the number "1". Mobile numbers vary in length, either 8 digits or 12 digits.

== Historical numbering plan pre-1993 ==
Before 1993, telephone numbers would consist either of a two-digit area code and a six-digit subscriber number in cities and large towns, for example, (02) 412702 in Oslo, or a three-digit area code and a five-digit subscriber number in smaller towns, for example, (034) 83000 in Larvik.

On 28 January 1993, a closed telephone numbering plan was adopted, with eight-digit telephone numbers incorporating the area code and full number dialling for local and national calls, with Oslo numbers prefixed with the digits '22'. Service numbers were to be three digits long, Directory numbers four digits and some companies were allocated five-digit numbers, ex. 07575. GSM telephony was also introduced in 1993, and those numbers always start with the digits '4' or '9'.

== Emergency numbers ==
Historically, the local operator would take emergency calls and forward them to the police, fire or local doctor. In 1964, the emergency number 000 was introduced. In 1985, a modernized emergency service was started at Haukeland hospital in Bergen for Hordaland. In 1986, the emergency numbers changed to 001 for fire brigade, 002 for police and 003 for ambulance. These numbers changed to 110, 112 and 113 in 1994, when the international access code changed from 095 to 00.

== Landline numbers (as of 2020) ==
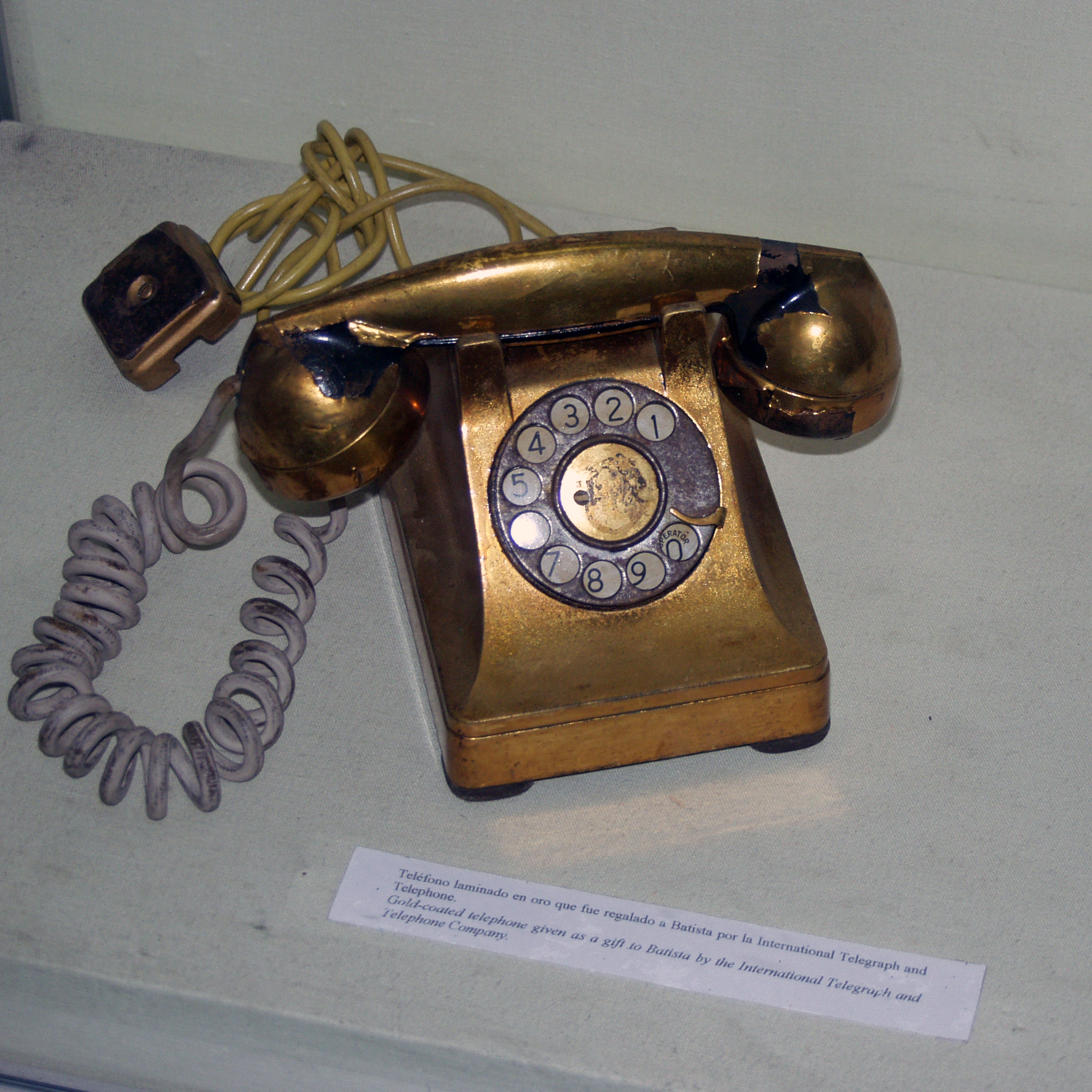
Telephone

Geographic numbers were abolished in January 2020, with Telenor finally switching off the country's copper wire network at the end of 2022. Caller IDs will no longer display the region, but rather say "Norway" or be left blank instead. These numbers are today used by VoIP services.

- 2x xx xx xx - 3x xx xx xx
- 50 xx xx xx - 57 xx xx xx
- 6x xx xx xx - 7x xx xx xx

== Non-geographic numbers ==
- 8xx xx xxx: Non-geographical numbers (toll-free, voicemail, premium-numbers, television shows, etc.)
- 02xxx - 09xxx : Non-geographical numbers (land-line rate). Common with e.g. taxi companies and commercial services. Dialled from outside Norway as +47 0xxxx
- xxxx: Used in SMS, mostly used for campaigns, services and bot messages. They cost money to send, but some numbers are free to send.

== Mobile numbers ==
- 4xx xx xxx
- 9xx xx xxx
- 58 xx xx xx xx xx: Mobile numbers (12-digit numbers for M2M/IoT communication)
- 59 xx xx xx: Mobile numbers (8-digit numbers for M2M/IoT communication)

== Emergency ==
- 110: Fire brigade
- 112: Police
- 113: Ambulance
- 116 111: Childrens welfare hotline
- 116 117: Non-emergency medical and hospital
- 116 123: Mental Health help lifeline. Also the Norwegian Equivalent of National Suicide Prevention Lifeline / 988 Suicide & Crisis Lifeline.

== Special numbers ==
- 00: International prefix. Commonly represented by a plus symbol (+) in modern phone applications.
- 01: Reserved for future changes
- 02xxx to 09xxx: 5-digit non-geographical numbers (these numbers are mostly equivalent to 815 non-geographical numbers, and can be acquired by any company or organization given availability and a fee of between NOK 3,300 and NOK 125,000 per year)
- 100-189: Standardized special numbers (emergency numbers, road and public transport information, etc.)
- 19x: Service provider-specific special numbers
- 18xx: Directory enquiry services
- 116xxx: Harmonised services of social value

== Sources ==
- Nummerplan: E.164, www.nkom.no. Retrieved 29 November 2022.
- Ansatte, jan.mayen.no. Retrieved 25 January 2017.
