= European Union international calls regulations =

Regulation 2018/1971
- European Union regulation
- Text with EEA relevance
- Title: Regulation (EU) 2018/1971 of the European Parliament and of the Council of 11 December 2018 establishing the Body of European Regulators for Electronic Communications (BEREC) and the Agency for Support for BEREC (BEREC Office), amending Regulation (EU) 2015/2120 and repealing Regulation (EC) No 1211/2009
- Made by: European Parliament & Council

Other legislation
- Amends: 2015/2120

Regulation 2018/1971 sets the maximum price caps for intra-EU international communications made from subscribers' home network countries. Regulation is in force since 15 May 2019.

== Territorial extent ==
Countries where regulation applies (both in blue and green)

Regulation applies to 30 EEA member countries (All 27 EU member countries as well as 3 EFTA member countries - Iceland, Liechtenstein and Norway).

- Austria
- Belgium
- Bulgaria
- Croatia
- Cyprus
- Czech Republic
- Denmark
- Estonia
- Finland
- France
- Germany
- Greece
- Hungary
- Iceland
- Ireland
- Italy
- Latvia
- Liechtenstein
- Lithuania
- Luxembourg
- Malta
- Netherlands
- Norway
- Poland
- Portugal
- Romania
- Slovakia
- Slovenia
- Spain
- Sweden

== Prices ==
In force from		15 May 2019
In force until		14 May 2024
Service	Unit	Price cap (in EUR, excl. VAT)
Retail caps (apply to subscribers)
Outgoing international calls made from the home network to any EEA number	price of 1 minute	0.19
Outgoing international calls made from the home network to any EEA number	billing interval	Not regulated
Outgoing text message to any EEA number	price of 1 message	0.06
Legend	Past	
Legend	Active	
Legend	Future	

=== Local price limits ===
When maximum prices are denominated in other currencies other than the euro, the initial limits is calculated using the average of the reference exchange rates published in the Official Journal of the European Union (OJoEU) on 15 January, 15 February and 15 March 2019. From 2020, the limits in currencies other than the euro are revised annually. The revised limits applied from 15 May using the average of the reference exchange rates published in the OJoEU on 15 January, 15 February and 15 March of that year.
