= Telephone numbers in Saudi Arabia =

This is a discussion of telephone numbers in the Kingdom of Saudi Arabia. The country's calling code is +966. In addition to a numbering plan, there are also dedicated numbers or number formats for Internet services, toll-free numbers, and public or emergency services.

== Numbering plan ==
The country's country calling code is +966. Saudi Arabia's numbering plan is the following:

- 011 XXX Xx 0510674055XX - Riyadh & the greater central region
- 012 XXX XXXX - Western region, includes Makkah, Jeddah, Taif, Rabigh
- 013 XXX XXXX- The Eastern Province, which includes, Dammam, Khobar, Qatif, Jubail, Dhahran, Hafar al-Batin & others
- 014 XXX XXXX - Al-Madinah, Tabuk, Al-Jawf, Yanbu, Turaif, Skaka and Northern Borders Region
- 016 XXX XXXX - Al-Qassim, Majma & Hail
- 017 XXX XXXX - Southern regions like Asir, Al-Baha, Jizan, Najran & Khamis Mushait
- 0811 1XX XXXX - GO (nomadic)
- 050/053/055/0573 XXX XXXX - Saudi Telecom Company
- 051 XXX XXXX - Salam Mobile (previously occupied by bravO! Telecom)
- 058/059 XXX XXXX - Zain Group
- 054/056 XXX XXXX - Mobily
- 0570/0571/0572 XX XXXX Virgin Mobile
- 0574/0575 XX XXXX Red Bull Mobile
- 0576/0577/0578/0579 XXXXXX Lebara Mobile

== Internet services ==
- 360 XXXX - Internet Services - Dial-up
- 366 XXXX - Internet Services - Dial-up
- 08 111 XXXXXX - Atheeb GO Telecom phone numbers

== Toll-free and universal access ==
- 800XXX XXXX - Toll free
- 9200 XXXXX - Universal Access Number (prefixes 9200 to 9209)

== Services and emergency ==
- 911 - Unified Security Operations Center in Makkah Region, Riyadh Region and Eastern Region and all Saudi provinces in the future.
- 997 - Saudi Red Crescent
- 998 - Saudi Civil Defense
- 999 - Saudi Police Force
- 959 - Mobile Customer Service Center (Zain)
- 600 - Mobile Customer Service Center (Bravo Telecom)
- 1100 - Mobile Customer Service Center (Mobily)
- 1789 - Mobile Customer Service Center (Virgin Mobile)
- 1755 - Mobile Customer Service Center (Lebara Mobile)
- 900 - Telephone Customer Service Center (STC) (They were separated before, 907 for Landline, 902 for Mobile, but since September 2015, they are merged)
- 933 - Saudi Electricity Customer Services
- 937 - Saudi Ministry of Health Services
- 939 - Saudi Water and Sewage Services (Eastern Region)
- 940 - Saudi Municipal Services
- 966 - Saudi Natural Disasters
- 985 - Saudi General Intelligence Presidency
- 989 - Saudi Public Security
- 990 - Saudi Telephone Service for Security Issues
- 992 - Saudi Passport
- 993 - Saudi Traffic Police Force
- 994 - Saudi Border Checkpoint
- 995 - Saudi Anti-Narcotics
- 996 - Saudi Highway Traffic Police Force

== See also ==
- Telecommunications in Saudi Arabia#Telephones
