= Telephone country code =

Telephone prefix in the international telephone numbering plan

Worldwide distribution of country codes. Regions are coloured by first digit.

A telephone country code is a country-specific telephone number prefix for international direct dialing (IDD), a system for reaching telephone service subscribers in foreign areas via international telecommunication networks. Country codes are defined by the International Telecommunication Union (ITU) in ITU-T standards E.123 and E.164.

Country codes constitute the international telephone numbering plan. They are used only when dialing a telephone number in a foreign region other than the caller's. They are dialed before the national telephone number. Typically, dialing a foreign telephone number, requires at least one additional prefix, the international call prefix which is an exit code from the national numbering plan to the international one. It essentially requests and reserves an international telephone circuit for the call. IITU standards recommend the digit sequence 00 for this prefix and most countries comply. The prefix is 011 in the countries of the North American Numbering Plan (NANP), while a minority of countries use other prefixes. When printing telephone numbers the requirement of dialing this prefix is indicated by a plus-sign (+) in front of a complete international telephone number, per ITU Recommendation E164.

Country codes were originally introduced and termed International Codes in 1960 by the International Telegraph and Telephone Consultative Committee (C.C.I.T.T.) in the II^{nd} Plenary Assembly in New Delhi, but have sometimes also been referred to as "country dial-in codes", or historically as "international subscriber dialing" (ISD) codes in the United Kingdom.

A country or region with an autonomous telephone administration must apply for membership in the International Telecommunication Union (ITU) to participate in the international public switched telephone network (PSTN). Country codes are defined by the ITU-T section of the ITU in standards E.123 and E.164.

== History ==
Country codes were first defined in 1960 by the International Telegraph and Telephone Consultative Committee (C.C.I.T.T) in Recommendation E.29 in the ITU Red Book as international codes. This work for the II^{nd} Plenary Assembly of the C.C.I.T.T. only considered an international numbering plan for Europe, parts of western Asia, and some Mediterranean countries,

In 1964, E.29 was expanded with a global code system of world numbering zones, loosely defined by geographic location.

In the 1968 White Book, the definition of country codes was relegated to ITU Recommendation E.161.

Codes were typically allocated by landmass and then subdivided by the capacity of each network at the time. France, the United Kingdom, the US and USSR obtained preferential numbers due to their dominance in telecommunications at the time, whereas China was able to ensure that Taiwan was officially unlisted while being allocated the code "886".

== World numbering zones ==
The world numbering zones were defined by the C.C.I.T.T. in Recommendation E.29 in 1964. They were generally defined geographically, with exceptions for political and historical alignments. The terminology is largely obsolete.

Zone 1, the North American Numbering Plan (NANP), uses country code 1 and a three-digit area code to designate the area served within the United States and its territories, Canada, and much of the Caribbean.

Zone 2 uses two two-digit country codes (20, 27) and seven sets of three-digit codes (21x–26x, 29x), mostly to serve Africa, but also Aruba, Faroe Islands, Greenland and British Indian Ocean Territory.

Zones 3 and 4 use sixteen two-digit codes (30–34, 36, 39–41, 43–49) and four sets of three-digit codes (35x, 37x, 38x, 42x) to serve Europe.

Zone 5 uses eight two-digit codes (51–58) and two sets of three-digit codes (50x, 59x) to serve Central America (including Mexico) and South America.

Zone 6 uses seven two-digit codes (60–66) and three sets of three-digit codes (67x–69x) to serve Maritime Southeast Asia and Oceania.

Zone 7 uses two digits (7x) to serve Russia and Kazakhstan.

Zone 8 uses four two-digit codes (81, 82, 84, 86) and four sets of three-digit codes (80x, 85x, 87x, 88x) to serve East Asia, Mainland Southeast Asia and special services.

Zone 9 uses seven two-digit codes (90–95, 98) and three sets of three-digit codes (96x, 97x, 99x) to serve the West Asia, Central Asia and South Asia.

== See also ==
- List of telephone country codes
- Country code
