= Telephone numbers in Italy =

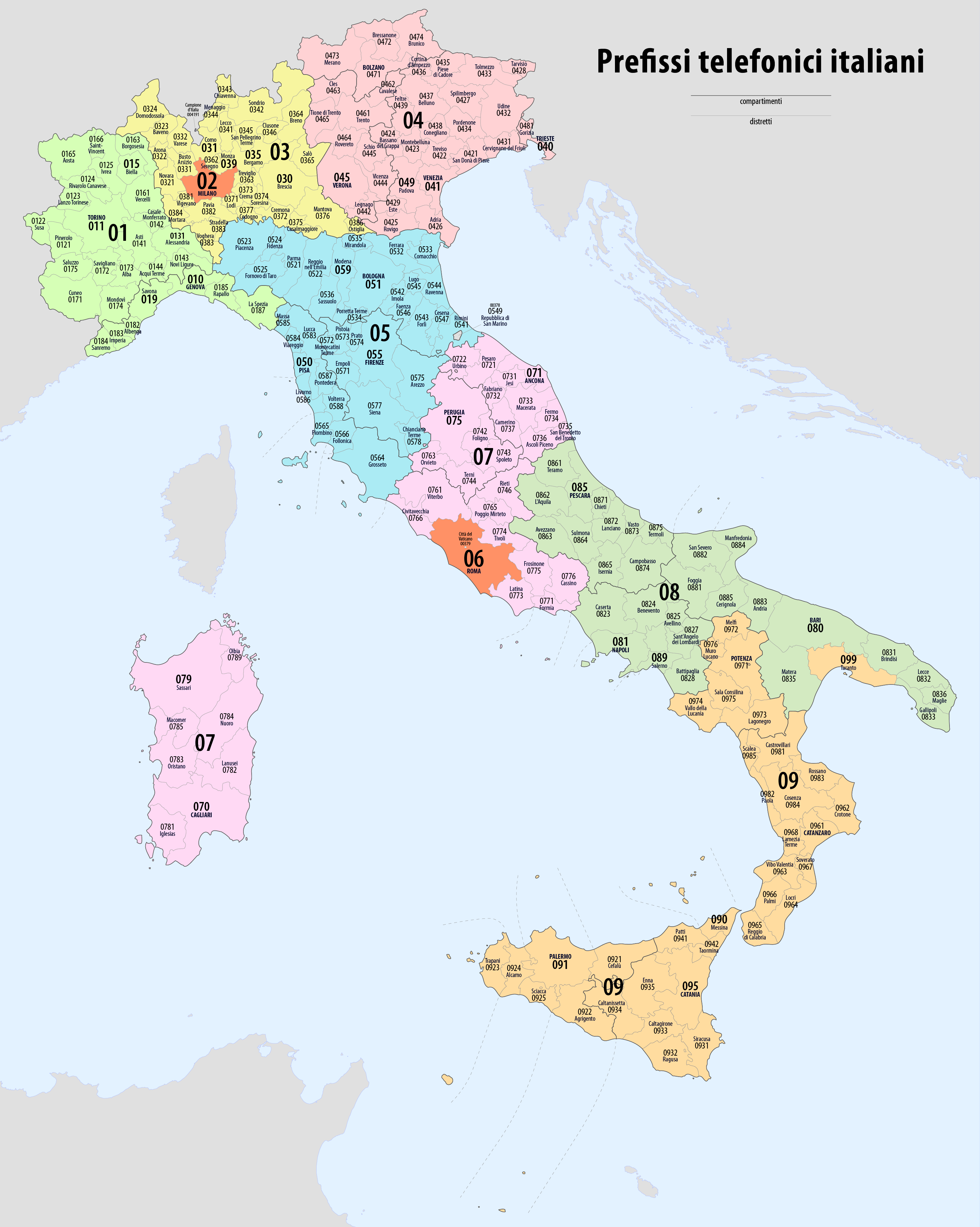
- Map of Italy colored according to landline area codes
- Country: Italy
- Continent: Europe
- Regulator: Autorità per le Garanzie nelle Comunicazioni
- Numbering plan type: Open
- Format: 0x… xxxxx… (geographical); 3xx xxxxxx… (mobile)
- Country code: +39
- International access: 00
- Long-distance: None

Telephone numbers in Italy are managed by the Autorità per le Garanzie nelle Comunicazioni (AGCOM), a national regulatory authority for the communication industry located in Rome.

Italian telephone numbers are defined by an open telephone numbering plan that assigns subscriber telephone numbers of six to eleven digits. In addition, other short codes are used for special services. The plan is organized by types of services, indicated by the first digit. Geographic landline numbers start with the digit 0, while mobile telephone numbers start with 3. Four types of emergency services use three-digit telephone numbers in the group 11X, including 112 for the Carabinieri. Other initial digits denote other services, such as toll-free numbers.

The dialing procedures for callers mandate that the full telephone number is always dialed, including the area code, which is called prefix (prefisso in Italian). Since 1998, the leading 0 of landline numbers has to be included also when calling from abroad, in contrast with the practice in many other countries.

The country code for calling Italy from abroad is 39. For calling foreign destinations from Italy, the international call prefix is 00, as is standard in most European countries.

Italian regulations prescribe no fixed rules for grouping the digits of telephone numbers for printing or display. Various grouping schemes are commonly used and a telephone number is likely to be written or pronounced differently by different people. Commonly used formatting or punctuation characters include the space character, the dot, full stop, and the hyphen.

== Number format ==
The minimum length of telephone numbers is three digits and the maximum is twelve.

=== Landline service ===
Landline numbers start with the digit 0 and are 6 to 11 digits long, although they are rarely shorter than 9. They are composed of a variable length prefix followed by a variable length subscriber number.

Prefixes are assigned on a geographical basis, starting from the north-west of the country, heading east and then south; for example: Turin has "011", Milan has "02", Brescia has "030", Trieste has "040", Florence has "055", Rome has prefix "06", Ancona has "071", Naples has "081", and Palermo has "091". Apart from the capital and Milan, which have the sole two-digit codes, principal cities/regions have three-digit codes and smaller towns have four-digit codes.

=== Mobile telephone service ===
Mobile telephone numbers start with the digit 3 and are generally ten digits long. It is still possible, but rare, to find nine-digit numbers, which were the first to be assigned.

The group of the first three digits of a mobile telephone number (prefix) identifies the mobile network operator that assigned the number, but since 2002, mobile number portability is possible and thus any number can end up being managed by any carrier.

Some network operators allow the caller to insert additional digits for redirecting calls to voice mail. For example, dialing, "36 339 7550176" might connect to the voice mail service of the telephone number "339 7550176". The extra digits vary based on the network operator managing the service.

=== Emergency and service numbers ===
Emergency and service numbers start with the digit 1. Four emergency numbers are currently in use, but a process has been started to consolidate them with 112, previously assigned to the gendarmerie, already the unique emergency number in some areas. Calls to 112 are answered within seconds and in multiple languages.

The complete list of emergency numbers is:

- "112": Gendarmerie (Carabinieri)
- "113": State Police (Polizia di Stato)
- "114": Helpline for children, handled by "SOS Il Telefono Azzurro Onlus"
- "115": National Fire Department (Vigili del Fuoco)
- "118": Regional Emergency Medical Service

Other service numbers are:

- "10...": Carrier selection codes, to be prepended to the dialed number;
- "116000": Hotline for missing children, handled by "SOS Il Telefono Azzurro Onlus";
- "117": Financial Gendarmerie (Guardia di Finanza);
- "12xx": Directory services;
  - "1240": Pronto Pagine Bianche, service provided by Italiaonline;
  - "1254": Directory service provided by Telecom Italia, major national operator;
- "15xx": Public utility services;
  - "1515": Fire department (forestry), handled by Corpo Forestale dello Stato;
  - "1525": Environmental emergencies;
  - "1518": Road information, handled by CCISS;
  - "1530": Maritime assistance and rescue, handled by Italian Navy Coast Guard;
- "194...": Customer care services;
- "19696": Helpline for children, handled by "SOS Il Telefono Azzurro Onlus";

=== Special-rate numbers ===
Special-rate numbers start with 8 and include toll-free numbers (called green numbers, numeri verdi in Italian, starting with "80..."), shared-rate numbers ("84...") and premium-rate services ("89...").

=== Other numbers ===
Numbers starting with 4 are used for network-specific phone services like voice mailbox and various information services; they can be free, non-premium or premium.

Included in this category are, among others:

- "40...": free operator internal services;
- "455...": fundraising services for social purposes by non-profit agencies, organizations and associations and government;
- "47...": mass call services;

The digit 5 has been reserved for VoIP numbers.

Finally 7 is used for internet services such as virtual fax numbers and dial up internet access ("70...").

=== Unassigned numbers ===
Numbers starting with the digits 2, 6 and 9 are currently unassigned and reserved for future purposes.

== Historical number formats ==
=== Trunk code removal ===
In the past it was possible to omit the prefix when calling from a landline to another landline in the same area. The digit "0" was the trunk code and it had to be removed when calling from abroad.

This changed in 1998, with a transition period lasting from 19 June to 31 December. The new dialing procedures require dialing the full number for all calls. The main advantage is the availability of millions of previously reserved phone numbers. The change was widely advertised with a campaign named "Fissa il prefisso" ("Attach the prefix").

It was originally intended to replace the leading 0 with 4 for landlines. This was scheduled for implementation commencing 29 December 2000, but never happened. Instead, 4 was assigned to identify network services.

Example for calling the landline subscriber number xxxxxxxx in Rome:

- xxxxxxxx: from within Rome, before 1998;
- 06xxxxxxxx: from within Rome, after 1998;
- 06xxxxxxxx: from outside Rome, both before and after 1998;
- +396xxxxxxxx: from abroad, before 1998;
- +3906xxxxxxxx: from abroad, after 1998.

=== Mobile numbers prefix shortening ===
Until 2001 a leading "0" was part of any mobile phone number, but it has been removed.

Example for calling the mobile phone number 3xxxxxxxxx:

- 03xxxxxxxxx: from within Italy, before 2001;
- 3xxxxxxxxx: from within Italy, after 2001;
- +393xxxxxxxxx: from abroad, both before and after 2001.

=== Other changes ===
Several other smaller changes occurred over the years: for example the prefix for toll free numbers changed from "167" to "800" in 1999.

- "116": Used to be assigned to Road help (ACI); It has changed to 803116. Some new number starting with 116 has been assigned to special services (for example the 116000 for missing children, already described above, or the 116117 assigned to non-urgent medical assistance)

== Special relations with other countries ==
=== Campione d'Italia ===
The Italian municipality Campione d'Italia, an exclave within the Swiss canton of Ticino, uses the Swiss telephone network and is part of the Swiss numbering plan, with local numbers using the +41 91 numbering range, although some Italian numbers are in use by the municipal council, which use the same +39 031 numbering range as the town of Como.

=== San Marino ===
The Italian enclave San Marino has its own country code 378, but landline numbers can be reached using the Italian country code as well: the prefix "0549" is assigned to San Marino. Dialing either "+378 xxxxxx" or "+39 0549 xxxxxx" will reach the same number. Mobile phone customers are sometimes assigned Italian phone numbers.

=== Vatican City ===
The country code 379 is assigned to Vatican City, but it is not used: telephone numbers in Vatican City are integrated into the Italian numbering plan. Vatican landline telephone numbers are in the form "+39 06 698xxxxx", "+39" being the country code for Italy and "06" the prefix for Rome.

== See also ==
- List of dialling codes in Italy
- List of Italian telephone companies
- Telecommunications in Italy
- Telephone numbers in San Marino
- Telephone numbers in Vatican City
- Internet in Italy
