= Vatican Telephone Service =

Telephone service in Vatican City

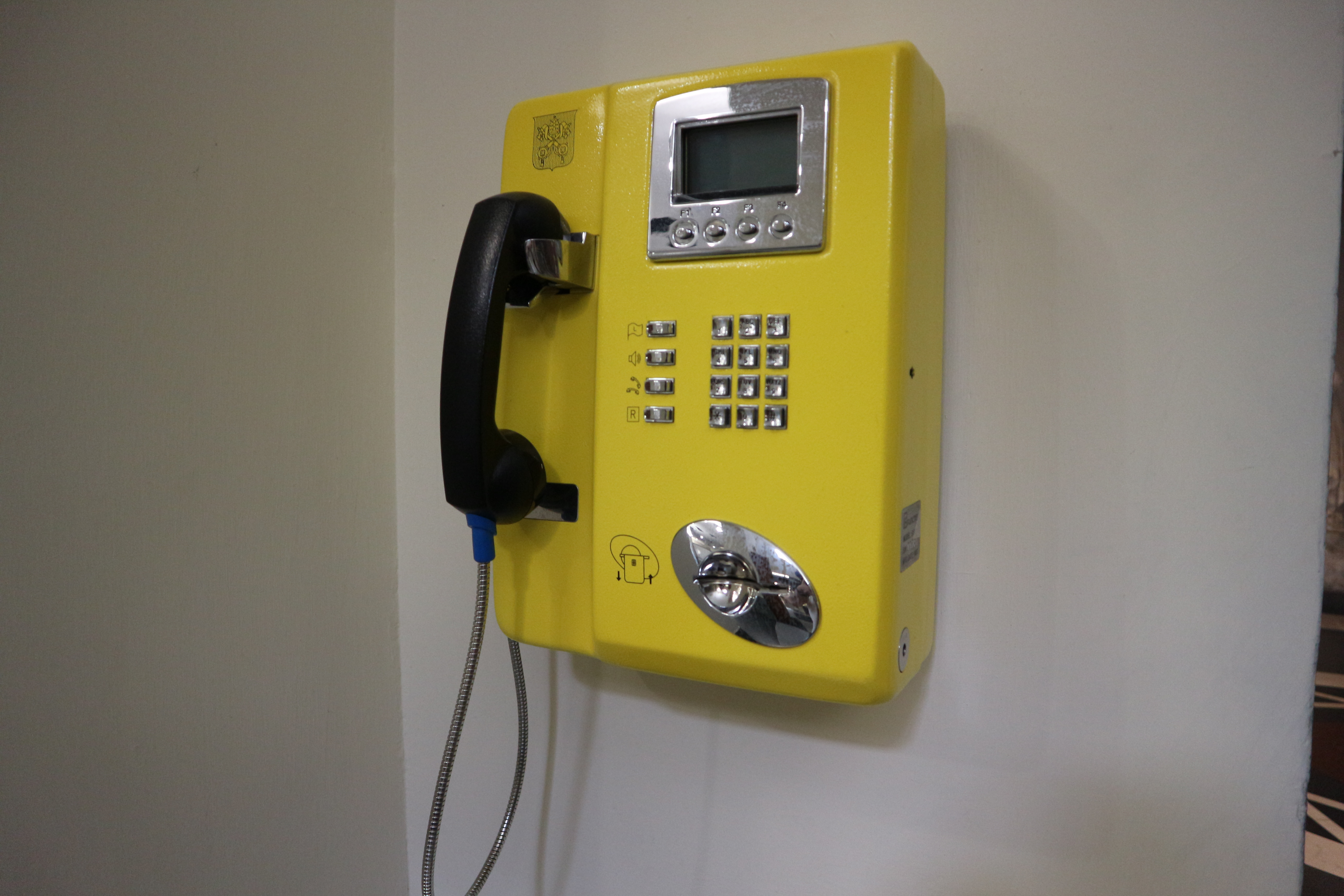
Pay phone in the Vatican City

The Vatican Telephone Service was first officially established in 1930. In 2002, it became part of the Governorate's Department of Telecommunication and oversees all telecommunications needs of Vatican City.

The assigned telephone code/country code for Vatican City is +379, but this code is not used. Instead, the Vatican City uses the country code +39 of Italy and assigns phone numbers starting with 698 within the regional code 06 for Rome.

== History ==
The Vatican Telephone Service was established in 1930 with the installation of its first telephone exchange, donated by American Catholics. The exchange, blessed by Pope Pius XI on November 19, 1930, initially served around 360 users within the Vatican.

In 1960, the original system was replaced with an upgraded exchange capable of managing 1,500 numbers, which was later expanded to support up to 3,000 lines.

By 2020, the Vatican Telephone Service had transitioned to a modern IP Multimedia Subsystem (IMS), connecting approximately 5,000 phone terminals through fiber-optic links that ensure stable connectivity to Italian and international networks.

== Mobile network operators ==
Vatican City does not have its own independent mobile network operators. Instead, mobile connectivity within the state is primarily provided through Italian mobile networks due to its geographic location and close ties with Italy. Visitors and residents in Vatican City typically receive coverage from major Italian carriers such as TIM, Vodafone, Wind Tre and Iliad which extend their services into the area.

== See also ==
- Telephone numbers in Vatican City
