= Telephone numbers in Vatican City =

Location
- Country: Vatican City
- Continent: Europe
- Regulator: Vatican Telephone Service
- Type: open
- Format: 06 698xxxxx

Access codes
- Country code: 39 (Italy); 379 (not in use)
- International access: 00
- Long-distance: None

Telephone numbers in Vatican City are integrated into the Italian telephone numbering plan. The International Telecommunication Union (ITU) has assigned country code 379 to Vatican City, but it is not in use.

Vatican telephone numbers are in the form 06 698xxxxx, where 06 the area code for Rome, which surrounds Vatican City. For dialing calls within Vatican City or to Italian destinations the area code must be dialed.

The telecommunications provider of Vatican City is the Vatican Telephone Service (part of the Governorate's Department of Telecommunications since 2002).

== See also ==
- Telephone numbers in San Marino
- Index of Vatican City-related articles
