= Telephone numbers in San Marino =

- Country: San Marino
- Continent: Europe
- Country code: 378
- International access: 00
- Long-distance: none

Telephone numbers in San Marino have six to ten digits. Numbers starting with either 0, 8 or 9 are assigned to landlines, 6 is used for mobile services, 5 for IP telephony services and 7 for premium numbers. No trunk prefixes are used: all the digits are always dialed.

The country code for San Marino is 378. However, landlines are also reachable via the Italian country code 39.

The international call prefix is 00. The emergency numbers are 112/113 (police), 115 (fire) and 118 (ambulance).

== History ==
Until 1996, San Marino was part of the Italian telephone numbering plan, using the Italian area code 0549. In 1996, the country adopted country code 378, although existing dialing arrangements between San Marino and Italy continued without change. In 1998, as Italy switched to a closed dialing plan, San Marino incorporated the 0549 area code into its subscriber numbers.

A telephone number in San Marino may be reached as follows:

- 0549 xxx xxx: from Italy
- +378 xxx xxx: from all other countries
- +39 0549 xxx xxx: from other countries, using the Italian country code
- +378 0549 xxx xxx: from other countries, using the San Marino country code and the Italian area code

Previously, country code 295 had been allocated to San Marino by the International Telecommunication Union in the late 1980s.

== See also ==
- Telephone numbers in Italy
- Telephone numbers in Vatican City
