= Vatican City =

Enclaved Holy See's independent city-state

Vatican City State: Stato della Città del Vaticano (Italian); Status Civitatis Vaticanae (Latin)
- Flag Coat of arms
- Anthem: Inno Pontificio (Italian) "Pontifical Hymn" noicon
- State Seal: Sigillo dello Stato della Città del Vaticano (Italian) Sigillum Status Civitatis Vaticanae (Latin); State Seal of Vatican City

- Location of the Vatican City in Europe
- Capital: Vatican City (city-state); 41°54.2′N 12°27.2′E
- Official languages: Italian (Note: Italian is the official working language of Vatican City. The Holy See's official language is Latin, with French the international diplomatic language.)
- National language: Italian (de facto); Latin (de jure as the official language of the Holy See)
- Religion: Catholicism (state religion)
- Demonyms: None (de jure); Vatican (de facto)
- Government: Unitary theocratic elective absolute monarchy
  - Sovereign entity: Holy See
  - Pope: Leo XIV
  - President of the Governorate: Raffaella Petrini
- Legislature: Pontifical Commission (Note: All powers delegated by the sovereign)

Establishment
  - Lateran Treaty: 11 February 1929 (Note: The Lateran Treaty was ratified, and took effect, on 7 June 1929.)

Area
  - Total: 0.49 (Note: The De Agostini Atlas Calendar listed the area of Vatican City as 44 ha (0.44 km^{2}) in its 1930 edition but corrected it to 49 ha (0.49 km^{2}) in its 1945–1946 edition.) km^{2} (0.19 sq mi) (195th)

Population
  - 2024 estimate: 882 (195th)
  - Density: 2,205/km^{2} (5,710.9/sq mi) (6th)
- GDP (PPP): 2021 estimate
  - Total: €14,859,970
  - Per capita: €19,450.22
- Currency: Euro (€) (EUR)
- Time zone: UTC+1 (CET)
  - Summer (DST): UTC+2 (CEST)
- Calling code: +379 (Note: ITU-T assigned code 379 to Vatican City. However, Vatican City is included in the Italian telephone numbering plan and uses the Italian country code 39, followed by 06 (for Rome) and 698.)
- ISO 3166 code: VA
- Internet TLD: .va

Vatican City
UNESCO World Heritage Site
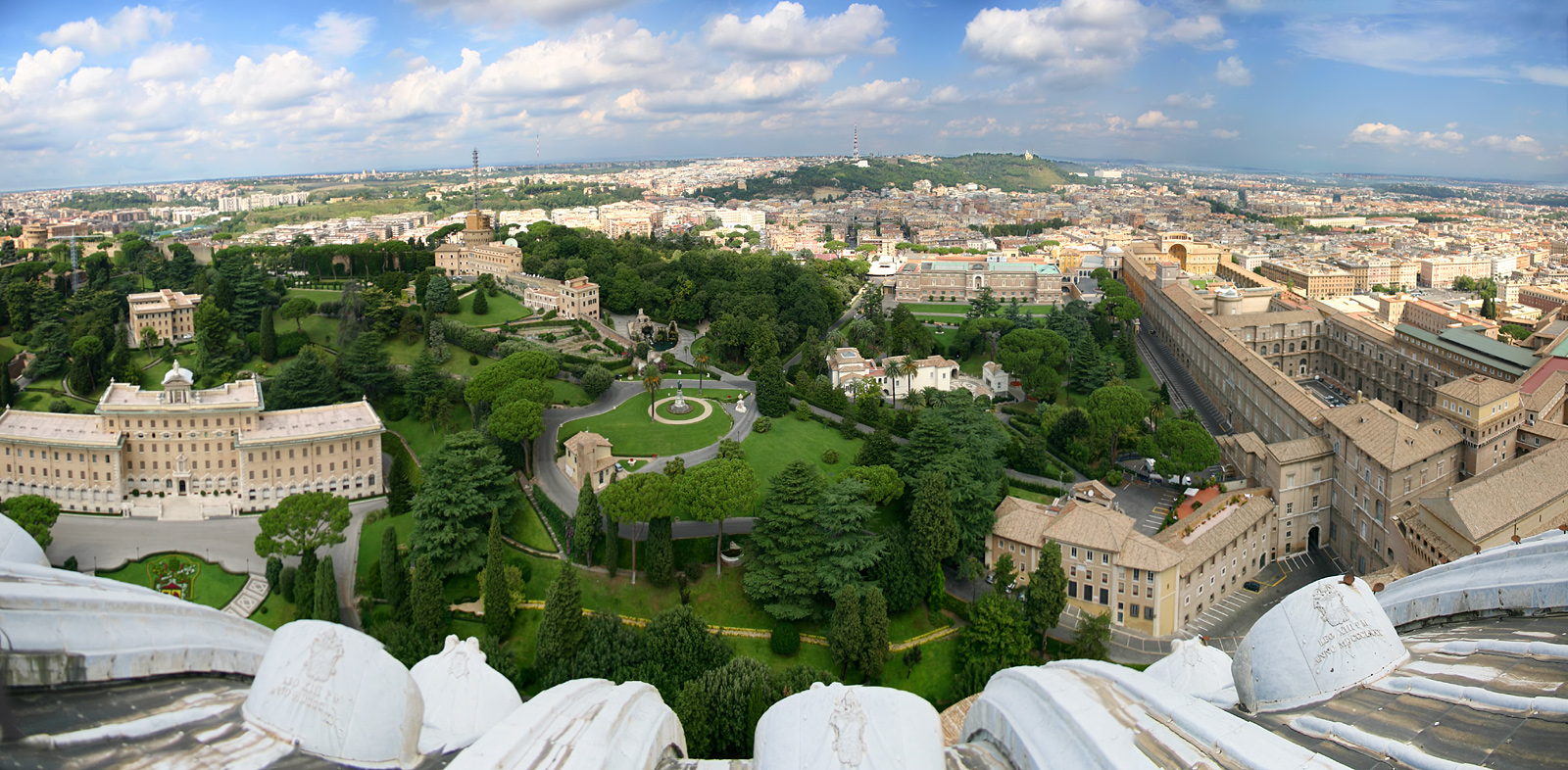
- Vatican City
- Interactive map of Vatican City
- Criteria: Cultural: i, ii, iv, vi
- Reference: 286
- Inscription: 1984 (8th Session)

Vatican City, (Note: /ˈvætɪkən ˈsɪti/) officially the Vatican City State, (Note: Italian: Stato della Città del Vaticano; Latin: Status Civitatis Vaticanae) is a landlocked sovereign city-state in Southern Europe. Ruled by the pope, it is an enclave within the city of Rome, Italy, and serves as the administrative centre of the Catholic Church. Vatican City is governed by the Holy See, the episcopal see of the Diocese of Rome and central authority of the church worldwide, which is itself a sovereign entity under international law.

Catholic theology holds that Saint Peter, an apostle of Jesus considered the first pope, was crucified on Vatican Hill in Rome during the 1st century AD. The Holy See first exercised temporal power over the Papal States, which formed on the Italian Peninsula with the donation of Frankish territory in 756. The pope returned to Rome at the end of the Avignon Papacy in 1377. Italian unification concluded with the capture of Rome by the Kingdom of Italy in 1870, after which the pope declared himself a "prisoner in the Vatican". The Roman question was settled in 1929 with the Lateran Treaty, which established the modern sovereign state of Vatican City.

With an area of 0.49 square kilometres (0.19 mi^{2}) and population of about 882, Vatican City is both the smallest country by area and the least populous. It is an absolute monarchy under the pope, who is elected by the College of Cardinals through conclaves. The pope delegates authority to the Pontifical Commission for Vatican City State, which acts as the state's legislative body.

Designated as a World Heritage Site, Vatican City includes numerous religious, historic, and cultural sites, including St. Peter's Basilica, the Sistine Chapel, the Apostolic Palace, the Vatican Library, and the Vatican Museums. On behalf of Vatican City, the Holy See maintains diplomatic relations with 180 states and is an observer state of the United Nations. Vatican City uses the euro as its official currency, issues its own euro coins, and is a de facto member of the Schengen Area.

== Name ==
The name Vatican City was first used in the Lateran Treaty, signed on 11 February 1929, which established the modern city-state named after Vatican Hill, the geographic location of the state within the city of Rome. Vatican itself is derived from the name of an Etruscan settlement, Vatica or Vaticum, located in the general area the Romans called Ager Vaticanus ('Vatican territory').

The Italian-language name of the city is Città del Vaticano or, more formally, Stato della Città del Vaticano, (Note: Stato della Città del Vaticano (Italian pronunciation: [ˈstaːto della tʃitˈta ddel vatiˈkaːno]) is the name used in the text of the state's Fundamental Law and in the state's official website.) meaning 'State of Vatican City'. Its Latin name is Status Civitatis Vaticanae; (Note: The ecclesiastical, and therefore official, pronunciation is [ˈstatus tʃiviˈtatis vatiˈkane]; the classical one is [ˈstatʊs kiːwɪˈtaːtɪs waːtɪˈkaːnae̯].) (Note: In the languages used by the Secretariat of State of the Holy See (except English, Latin and Italian, as already mentioned above): French: Cité du Vatican—État de la Cité du Vatican; German: Vatikanstadt, cf. Vatikan—Staat Vatikanstadt (in Austria: Staat der Vatikanstadt); Polish: Miasto Watykańskie, cf. Watykan—Państwo Watykańskie; Portuguese: Cidade do Vaticano—Estado da Cidade do Vaticano; Spanish: Ciudad del Vaticano—Estado de la Ciudad del Vaticano.) this is used in official documents by the Holy See, the Church and the pope.

== History ==
=== Early history ===
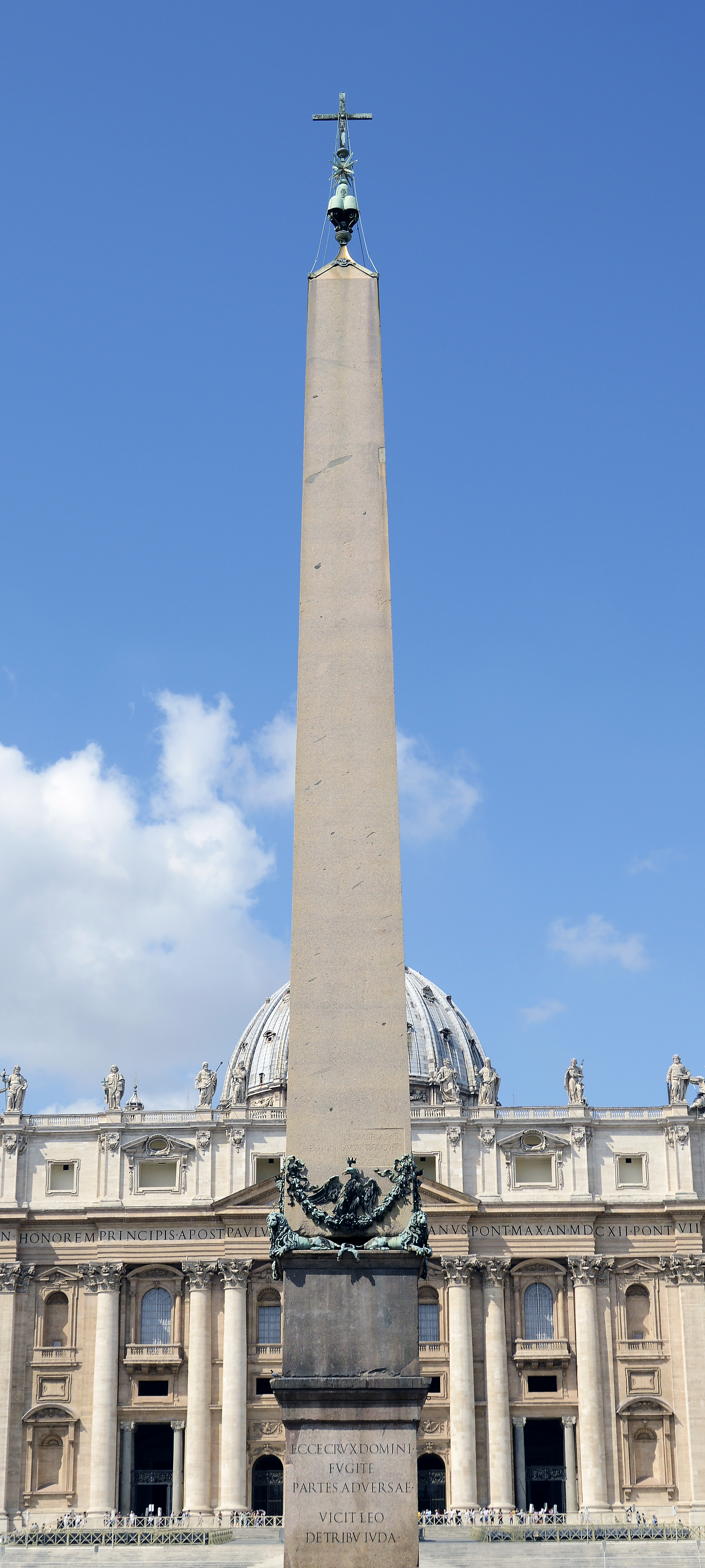
The Vatican obelisk in St. Peter's Square was brought to Rome from Egypt by Caligula.

The name "Vatican" was already in use in the time of the Roman Republic for the Ager Vaticanus, a marshy area on the west bank of the Tiber across from the city of Rome, located between the Janiculum, the Vatican Hill and Monte Mario, down to the Aventine Hill and up to the confluence of the Cremera creek. The toponym Ager Vaticanus is attested until the 1st century AD: afterwards, another toponym appeared, Vaticanus, denoting an area much more restricted: the Vatican Hill, today's St. Peter's Square, and possibly today's Via della Conciliazione. Because of its vicinity to Rome's archenemy, the Etruscan city of Veii (another naming for the Ager Vaticanus was Ripa Veientana or Ripa Etrusca), and for being subjected to the floods of the Tiber, the Romans considered this originally uninhabited part of Rome dismal and ominous.

The particularly low quality of Vatican wine, even after the reclamation of the area, was commented on by the poet Martial (AD 40 – c. AD 102). Tacitus wrote that in AD 69, the Year of the Four Emperors, when the northern army that brought Vitellius to power arrived in Rome, "a large proportion camped in the unhealthy districts of the Vatican, which resulted in many deaths among the common soldiery; and the Tiber being close by, the inability of the Gauls and Germans to bear the heat and the consequent greed with which they drank from the stream weakened their bodies, which were already an easy prey to disease".

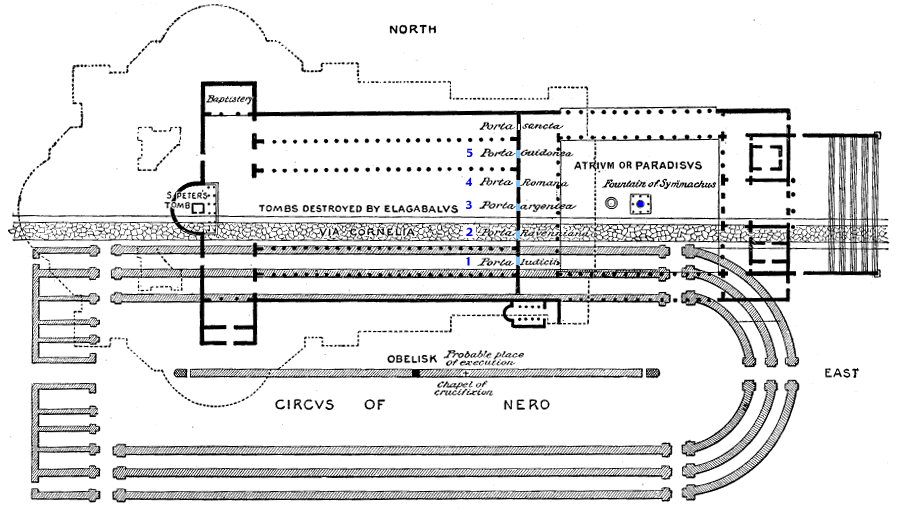
An early interpretation of the relative locations of the circus, and the medieval and current Basilicas of St. Peter

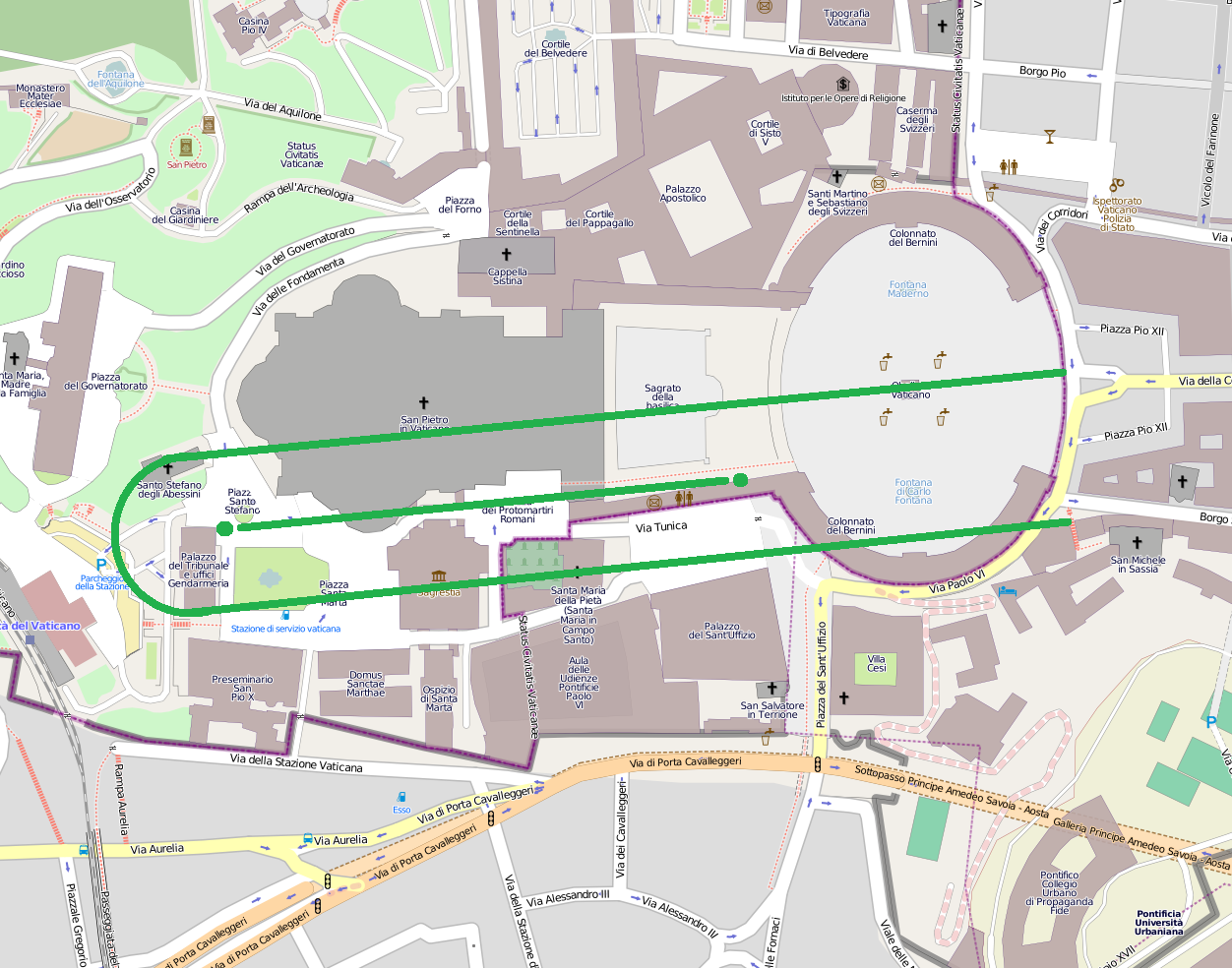
One possible modern interpretation

During the Roman Empire, many villas were constructed there, after Agrippina the Elder (14 BC – 18 October AD 33) drained the area and laid out her gardens in the early-1st century AD. In AD 40 her son, the emperor Caligula, built in her gardens a circus for charioteers. It was later completed by the emperor Nero and named the Circus Gaii et Neronis, usually called, simply, the Circus of Nero.

The Vatican obelisk in St Peter's Square is the last visible remnant from the Circus of Nero. It was brought from Heliopolis in Roman Egypt by the emperor Caligula. The obelisk originally stood at the centre of the spina (median) of the Roman circus. The circus became the site of martyrdom for many Christians after the Great Fire of Rome in AD 64. Tradition states that it was in this circus that Saint Peter was crucified upside-down. In 1586, the obelisk was moved to its current position by Pope Sixtus V, using a method devised by the Italian architect Domenico Fontana.

Opposite the circus was a cemetery separated by the Via Cornelia. Funeral monuments, mausoleums, small tombs, and altars to pagan gods of all kinds of polytheistic religions, were constructed before the construction of the Constantinian Basilica of St. Peter in the first half of the 4th century. A shrine dedicated to the Phrygian goddess Cybele and her consort Attis remained active long after the ancient Basilica of St. Peter was built nearby. Remains of this ancient necropolis were discovered during renovations by popes throughout the centuries, increasing in frequency during the Renaissance until it was systematically excavated from 1939 to 1941 on the order of Pope Pius XII.

The Constantinian basilica was built in 326 over what was believed to be the tomb of Saint Peter, buried in that cemetery. From then on, the land mass became more populated in connection with activity at the basilica. A palace was constructed nearby as early as the 5th century during the pontificate of Pope Symmachus (reigned 498–514). The Leonine Wall was constructed by Pope Leo IV following the sacking by Muslim raiders of Old St. Peter's Basilica in 846.

=== Papal States ===
Map of the Italian peninsula in 1796, showing the Papal States in central Italy coloured purple

Popes gradually came to have a secular role as governors of regions near Rome. They ruled the Papal States, which covered a large portion of the Italian Peninsula, for more than a thousand years until the mid-19th century, when all the territory belonging to the papacy was seized by the newly created Kingdom of Italy.

For most of this time, the popes did not live at the Vatican. The Lateran Palace, on the opposite side of Rome, was their habitual residence for about a thousand years. From 1309 to 1377, they lived in Avignon in France. On their return to Rome, they chose to live at the Vatican. They moved to the Quirinal Palace in 1583, after work on it was completed under Pope Paul V (1605–1621). In 1870, after the capture of Rome, popes have lived in the Vatican. Their prior residence at the Quirinal Palace was taken over by the King of Italy.

=== Under Italian rule (1871–1929) ===
In 1870 the pope's holdings were left in an uncertain situation when Rome was annexed by Italian forces, bringing to completion the Italian unification, after a nominal resistance by the papal forces. Between 1861 and 1929, the status of the pope of Rome was referred to as the "Roman Question".

While Italy abstained from intervening within the immediate boundaries of the Vatican, the state systematically confiscated church property throughout the rest of the peninsula. In 1871 the Quirinal Palace was confiscated by the king of Italy and became the royal palace. Thereafter, the popes resided undisturbed within the Vatican walls, and certain papal prerogatives were recognized by the Law of Guarantees, including the right to send and receive ambassadors. The popes did not recognize the Italian king's right to rule in Rome, and they refused to leave the Vatican compound until the dispute was resolved in 1929. Pope Pius IX (1846–1878), the last ruler of the Papal States, was referred to as a "prisoner in the Vatican". Forced to give up secular power, the popes focused on spiritual issues.

=== Lateran treaties ===
This situation was resolved on 11 February 1929, when the Lateran Treaty between the Holy See and the Kingdom of Italy was signed by Prime Minister and Head of Government Benito Mussolini on behalf of King Victor Emmanuel III and by Cardinal Secretary of State Pietro Gasparri for Pope Pius XI. The treaty, which was ratified and took effect on 7 June 1929, established the independent state of Vatican City and reaffirmed the special status of Catholic Christianity in Italy.

=== World War II ===
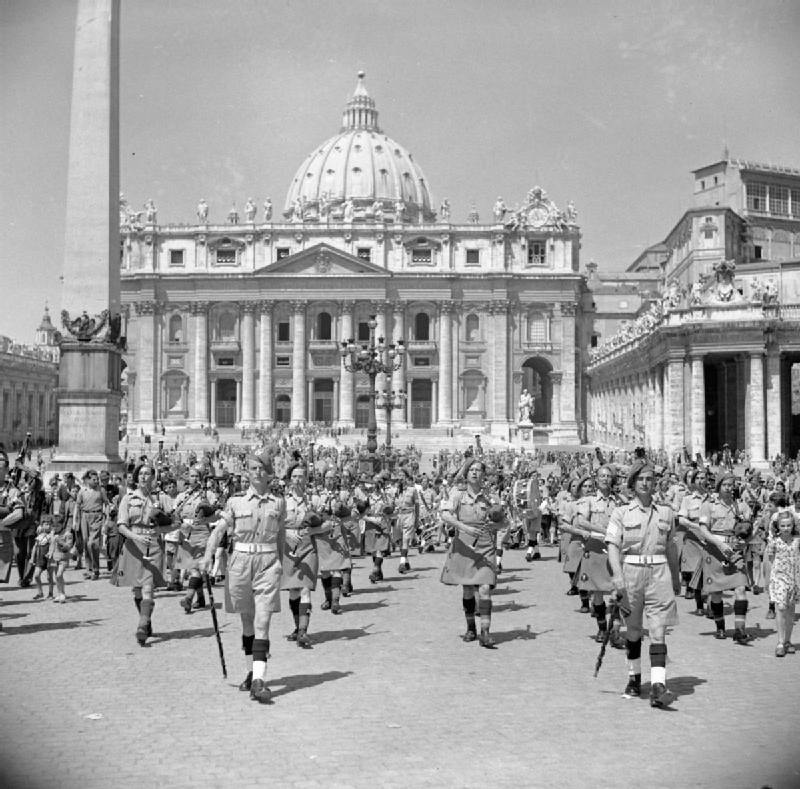
Musicians of the British Army's 38th (Irish) Brigade playing in front of St. Peter's Basilica in June 1944

The Holy See, which governed the Vatican City, pursued a policy of neutrality during World War II under the leadership of Pope Pius XII. German troops occupied Rome after the September 1943 Armistice of Cassibile, with Allied forces pushing them out in 1944. Both sides respected the Vatican City's status as neutral territory.

One of the main diplomatic priorities of Pius XII was to prevent the bombing of Rome. A high level of sensitivity led him to protest even the dropping of pamphlets over Rome by the Royal Air Force, claiming that the few which landed within the Vatican City violated its neutrality. The British government's policy towards the Vatican, as expressed in the minutes of a Cabinet meeting, was "that we should on no account molest the Vatican City, but that our action as regards the rest of Rome would depend upon how far the Italian government observed the rules of war".

After the United States entered into the war, US officials were against bombing the Vatican City, fearful of offending Catholic members of the American military, but said that "they could not stop the British from bombing Rome if the British so decided". The US military even exempted Catholic servicemembers from air raids on Rome and other areas with a significant Catholic presence, unless they voluntarily agreed to participate. Notably, with the exception of Rome, and presumably the possibility of the Vatican, no Catholic US servicemember refused a mission within German-held Italy. On the other hand, the British insisted "they would bomb Rome whenever the needs of the war demanded".

In December 1942, the British envoy to the Holy See suggested that Rome be declared an open city, a suggestion that the Holy See took more seriously than was probably meant by the envoy, who did not want Rome to be an open city. Mussolini rejected the suggestion when the Holy See put it to him. In connection with the Allied invasion of Sicily, 500 United States Army Air Forces aircraft bombed Rome on 19 July 1943, targeting Rome's railway hub in particular. Approximately 1,500 people were killed, and Pius XII, who had been described in the previous month as "worried sick" about the possibility of Rome being bombed, toured the affected areas. Another Allied bombing raid took place on 13 August 1943, after Mussolini had been ousted from power. The following day, the new Italian government declared Rome an open city, after consulting the Holy See on the wording of the declaration.

=== Post-war history ===
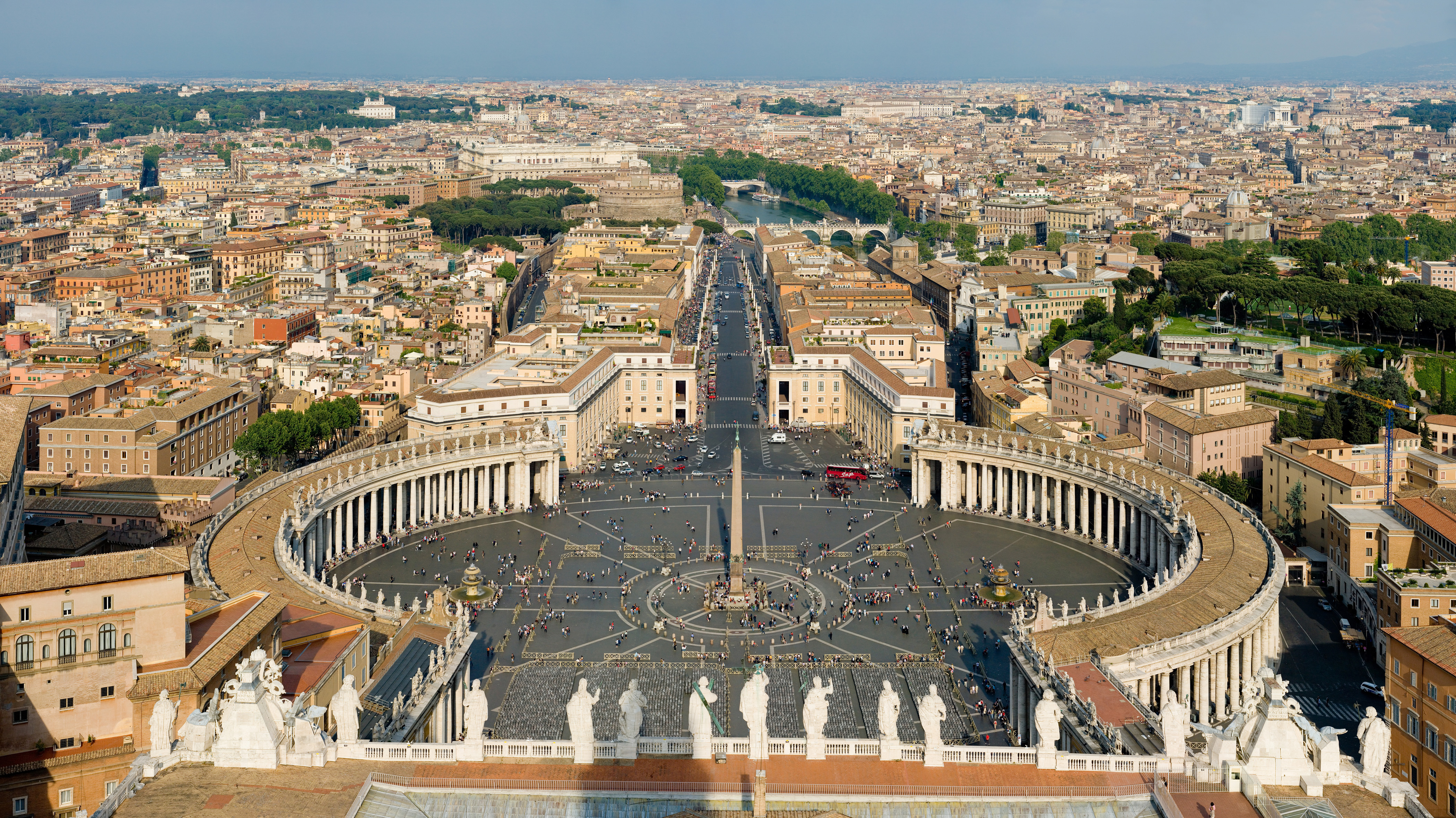
A view of St. Peter's Square from the top of Michelangelo's dome

Pius XII refrained from creating cardinals during the war. By the end of World War II, there were several prominent vacancies: Cardinal Secretary of State, Camerlengo, Chancellor, and Prefect for the Congregation for the Religious among them. Pius XII created 32 cardinals in early 1946, having announced his intention to do so in his preceding Christmas message.

In 1970, the Pontifical Military Corps, except for the Swiss Guard, was disbanded by Paul VI. The Gendarmerie Corps was transformed into a civilian police and security force.

In 1984, a new concordat between the Holy See and Italy modified provisions of the earlier treaty, including the position of Catholic Christianity as the Italian state religion, a position given to it by a statute of the Kingdom of Sardinia of 1848.

In 1995, construction of a new guest house, Domus Sanctae Marthae, adjacent to St Peter's Basilica was criticized by Italian environmental groups, backed by Italian politicians. They claimed the new building would block views of the Basilica from nearby Italian apartments. For a short while the plans strained the relations between the Vatican and the Italian government. The head of the Vatican's Department of Technical Services robustly rejected challenges to the Vatican State's right to build within its borders.

== Geography ==
A map of Vatican City, highlighting notable buildings and the Vatican gardens

Vatican City has a territory of 44 hectares (109 acres). The territory of Vatican City is part of the Vatican Hill, and of the adjacent former Vatican Fields. It is in this territory that St Peter's Basilica, the Apostolic Palace, the Sistine Chapel, and museums were built, along with other buildings. The area was part of the Roman rione of Borgo until 1929. Being separated from Rome, on the west bank of the river Tiber, the area was an outcrop of Rome that was protected by being included within the walls of Leo IV (847–855), and later expanded by the current fortification walls, built under Paul III (1534–1549), Pius IV (1559–1565), and Urban VIII (1623–1644).

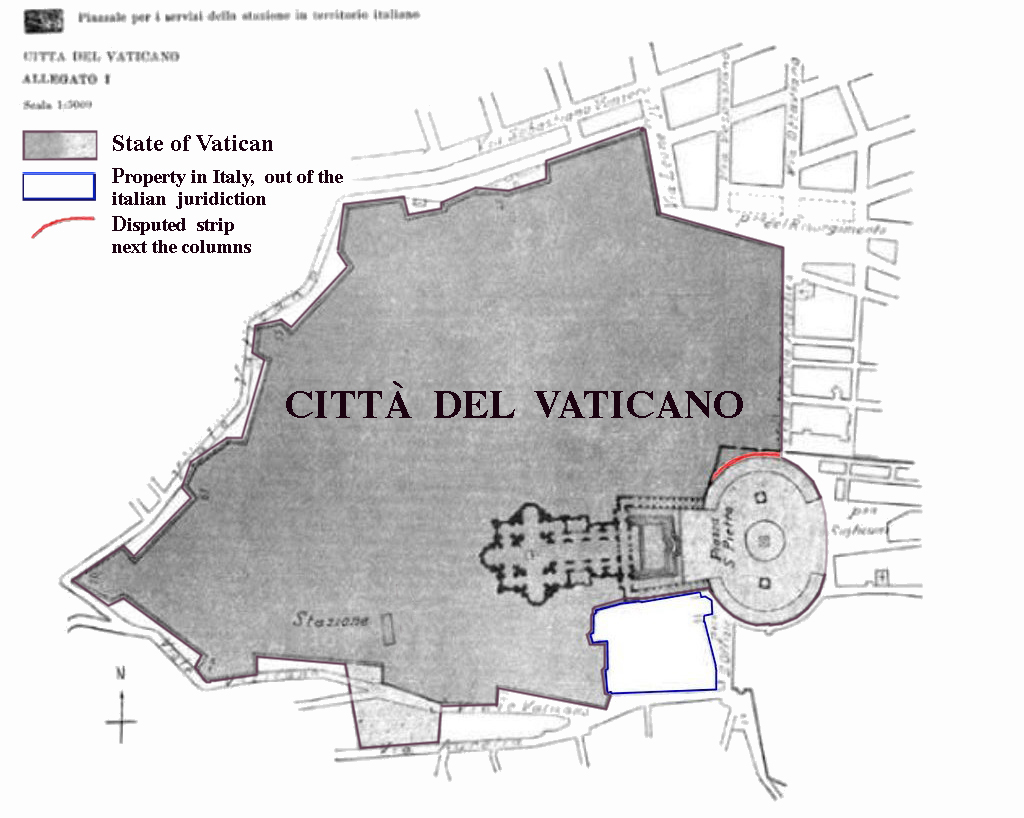
The territory of Vatican City State according to the Lateran Treaty

When the Lateran Treaty of 1929 that gave the state its form was being prepared, the boundaries of the proposed territory were influenced by the fact that much of it was all but enclosed by this loop. For some tracts of the frontier, there was no wall, but the line of certain buildings supplied part of the boundary, and for a small part of the frontier a modern wall was constructed.

The territory includes St Peter's Square, distinguished from the territory of Italy only by a white line along the limit of the square, where it touches Piazza Pio XII. St. Peter's Square is reached through the Via della Conciliazione which runs from close to the Tiber to St Peter's. This grand approach was constructed by Benito Mussolini after the conclusion of the Lateran Treaty. St Peter's Square is also partially encircled by the Ricciolo d'Italia, a small strip of Italian territory.

According to the Lateran Treaty, certain properties of the Holy See that are located in Italian territory, most notably the Papal Palace of Castel Gandolfo and the major basilicas, enjoy extraterritorial status similar to that of foreign embassies. These properties, scattered all over Rome and Italy, house essential offices and institutions necessary to the character and mission of the Holy See.

Castel Gandolfo and the named basilicas are patrolled internally by police agents of Vatican City State and not by Italian police. According to the Lateran Treaty, St. Peter's Square, up to but not including the steps leading to the basilica, is normally patrolled by the Italian police.

There are no passport controls for visitors entering Vatican City from the surrounding Italian territory. There is free public access to Saint Peter's Square and Basilica and, on the occasion of papal general audiences, to the hall in which they are held. For these audiences and for major ceremonies in Saint Peter's Basilica and Square, tickets free of charge must be obtained beforehand. The Vatican Museums, incorporating the Sistine Chapel, usually charge an entrance fee. There is no general public access to the gardens. Guided tours for small groups can be arranged to the gardens and excavations under the basilica. Other Vatican locations are open only to individuals who have business to transact there.

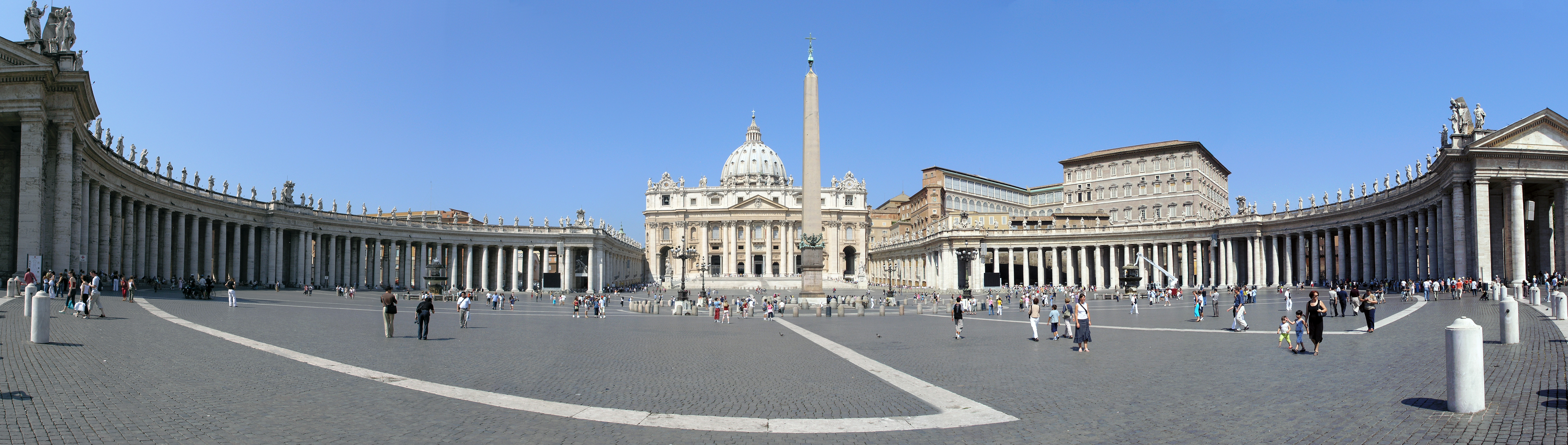
St. Peter's Square, the basilica and obelisk, from Piazza Pio XII

=== Climate ===
Vatican City's climate is the same as Rome's: a temperate, Mediterranean climate Csa. It has mild, rainy winters from October to mid-May, and hot, dry summers from May to September. Some minor local features, principally mists and dews, are caused by the anomalous bulk of St Peter's Basilica, the elevation, the fountains, and the size of the large paved square. The highest temperature ever recorded was 40.8 °C (105.4 °F) on 28 June 2022.

Climate data for Vatican City (Rome Ciampino Airport)
Month	Jan	Feb	Mar	Apr	May	Jun	Jul	Aug	Sep	Oct	Nov	Dec	Year
Record high °C (°F)	19.8 (67.6)	21.2 (70.2)	26.6 (79.9)	27.2 (81.0)	33.0 (91.4)	37.8 (100.0)	40.8 (105.4)	40.7 (105.3)	38.4 (101.1)	30.0 (86.0)	25.0 (77.0)	20.2 (68.4)	40.8 (105.4)
Mean daily maximum °C (°F)	11.9 (53.4)	13.0 (55.4)	15.2 (59.4)	17.7 (63.9)	22.8 (73.0)	26.9 (80.4)	30.3 (86.5)	30.6 (87.1)	26.5 (79.7)	21.4 (70.5)	15.9 (60.6)	12.6 (54.7)	20.4 (68.7)
Daily mean °C (°F)	7.5 (45.5)	8.2 (46.8)	10.2 (50.4)	12.6 (54.7)	17.2 (63.0)	21.1 (70.0)	24.1 (75.4)	24.5 (76.1)	20.8 (69.4)	16.4 (61.5)	11.4 (52.5)	8.4 (47.1)	15.2 (59.4)
Mean daily minimum °C (°F)	3.1 (37.6)	3.5 (38.3)	5.2 (41.4)	7.5 (45.5)	11.6 (52.9)	15.3 (59.5)	18.0 (64.4)	18.3 (64.9)	15.2 (59.4)	11.3 (52.3)	6.9 (44.4)	4.2 (39.6)	10.0 (50.0)
Record low °C (°F)	−11.0 (12.2)	−4.4 (24.1)	−5.6 (21.9)	0.0 (32.0)	3.8 (38.8)	7.8 (46.0)	10.6 (51.1)	10.0 (50.0)	5.6 (42.1)	0.8 (33.4)	−5.2 (22.6)	−4.8 (23.4)	−11.0 (12.2)
Average precipitation mm (inches)	67 (2.6)	73 (2.9)	58 (2.3)	81 (3.2)	53 (2.1)	34 (1.3)	19 (0.7)	37 (1.5)	73 (2.9)	113 (4.4)	115 (4.5)	81 (3.2)	804 (31.7)
Average precipitation days (≥ 1 mm)	7.0	7.6	7.6	9.2	6.2	4.3	2.1	3.3	6.2	8.2	9.7	8.0	79.4
Mean monthly sunshine hours	120.9	132.8	167.4	201.0	263.5	285.0	331.7	297.6	237.0	195.3	129.0	111.6	2,472.8

In July 2007, the Vatican accepted a proposal by two firms based respectively in San Francisco and Budapest, to become the first carbon neutral state by offsetting its carbon dioxide emissions with the creation of a Vatican Climate Forest in Hungary, as a purely symbolic gesture to encourage Catholics to do more to safeguard the planet. Nothing came of the project.

In November 2008, the Vatican installed solar panels on the roof of the Paul VI Audience Hall.

=== Gardens ===
Within the territory of the Vatican City are the Vatican Gardens (Italian: Giardini Vaticani), which account for about half of the Vatican territory. The gardens, established during the Renaissance and Baroque era, are decorated with fountains and sculptures.

The gardens cover approximately 23 hectares (57 acres). The highest point is 60 metres (197 ft) above mean sea level. Stone walls bound the area in the north, south, and west.

The gardens date back to medieval times when orchards and vineyards extended to the north of the Papal Apostolic Palace. In 1279 Pope Nicholas III (1277–1280) moved his residence back to the Vatican from the Lateran Palace and enclosed this area with walls. He planted an orchard (pomerium), a lawn (pratellum), and a garden (viridarium).

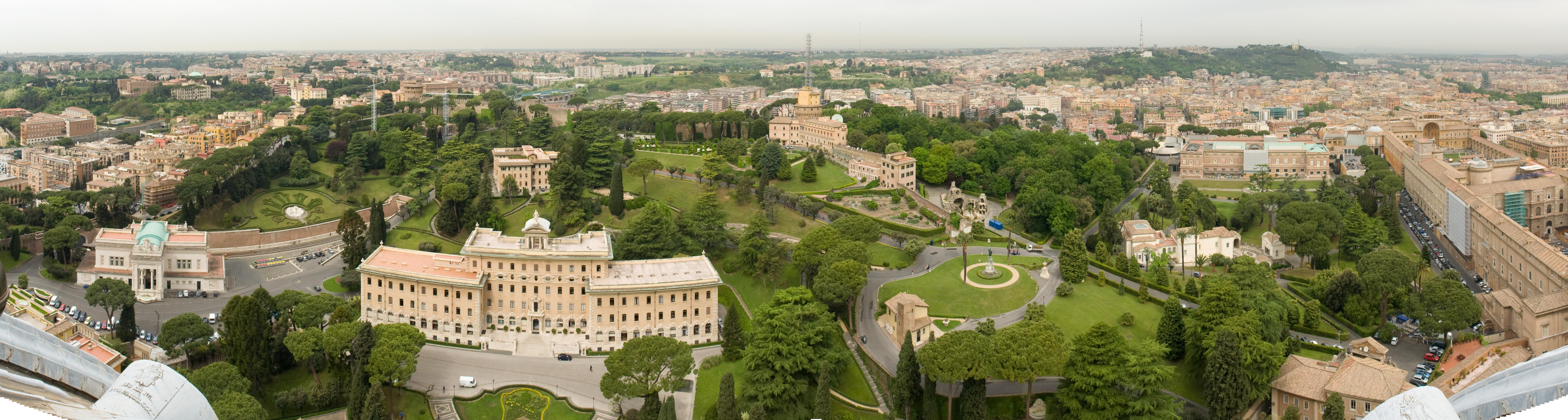
A panorama of the gardens viewed from St. Peter's Basilica

== Governance ==
The politics of Vatican City takes place in the context of a unitary absolute elective monarchy and being governed by the Holy See, in which the head of the Catholic Church holds power. The pope exercises principal legislative, executive, and judicial power over the State of Vatican City, which is a rare case of a non-hereditary monarchy.

=== State and Holy See ===
The Vatican City State, created in 1929 by the Lateran Pacts, provides the Holy See with a temporal jurisdiction and independence within a small territory. It is distinct from the Holy See. The state can thus be deemed a significant but not essential instrument of the Holy See. The Holy See itself has existed continuously as a juridical entity since Roman Imperial times and has been internationally recognized as a powerful and independent sovereign entity since Late Antiquity to the present, without interruption even at times when it was deprived of territory (e.g. 1870 to 1929).

Vatican City is one of the few widely recognized independent states that have not become members of the United Nations. The Holy See, which is distinct from Vatican City State, has permanent observer status, with all the rights of a full member except for a vote in the UN General Assembly.

=== Structure ===
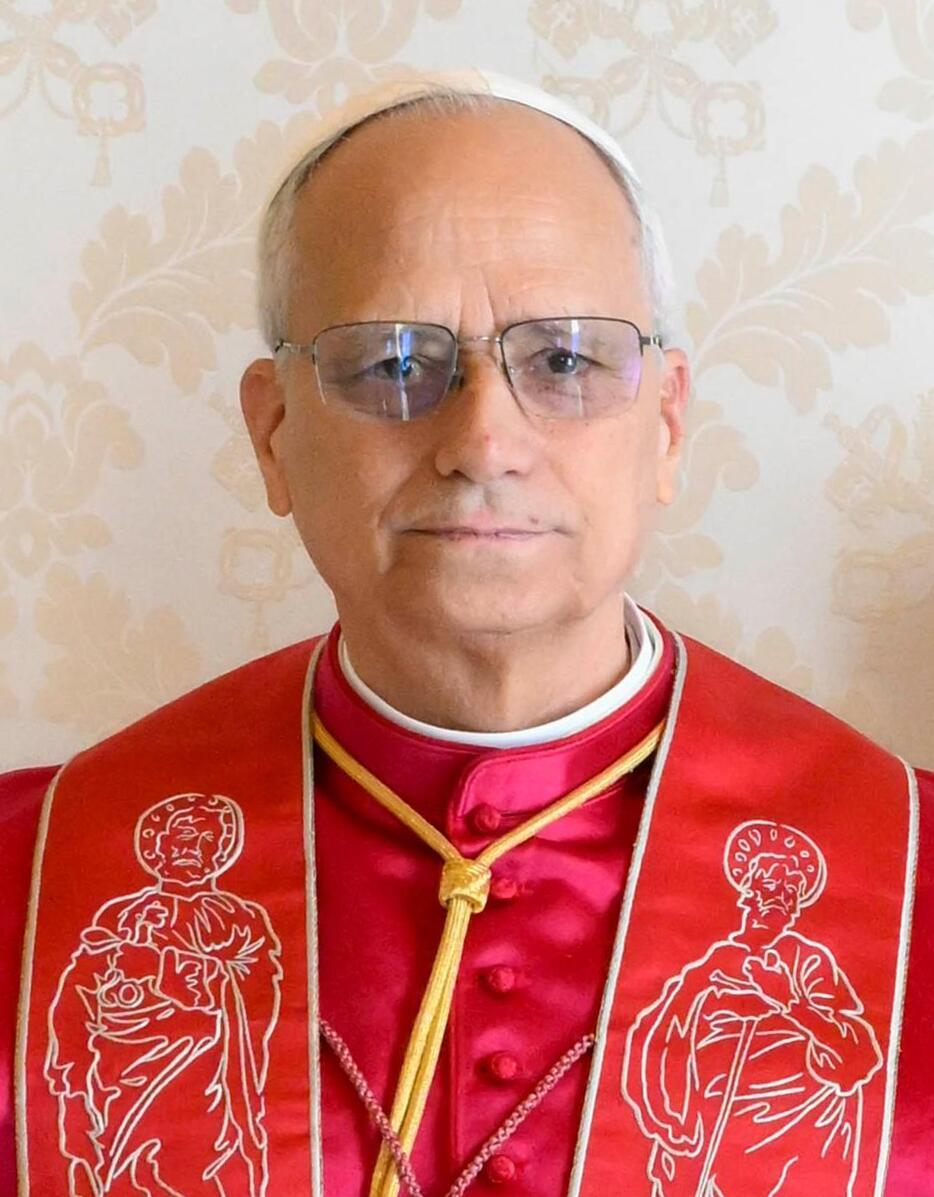
Pope Leo XIV, 2025

The government of Vatican City has a unique structure. As governed by the Holy See, the pope is the sovereign of the state, but he is supported by different bodies. Legislative authority is managed, in the pope's name, by the Pontifical Commission for Vatican City State, a body of cardinals appointed by the pope for five-year periods. Executive power is exercised by the president of that commission, who is consequently also the president of the governorate, assisted by the general secretary and the deputy general secretary. The state's foreign relations are entrusted to the Holy See's Secretariat of State and diplomatic service.

Nevertheless, the pope has absolute power in the executive, legislative, and judicial branches over Vatican City, and is thus the only absolute monarch in Europe.

Operationally, there are departments that deal with health, security, telecommunications and other matters.

==== Sede vacante ====
The Cardinal Camerlengo presides over the Apostolic Camera, to which is entrusted the administration of the property and protection of other papal temporal powers and rights of the Holy See during the period of the empty throne or sede vacante (papal vacancy). Those of the Vatican State remain under the control of the Pontifical Commission for Vatican City State. Acting with three other cardinals chosen by lot every three days, one from each order of cardinals (cardinal bishop, cardinal priest, and cardinal deacon), he in a sense performs during that period the functions of head of state of Vatican City. All the decisions these four cardinals take must be approved by the College of Cardinals as a whole.

==== Papal nobility ====
The nobility that was closely associated with the Holy See at the time of the Papal States continued to be associated with the Papal Court after the loss of these territories, generally with merely nominal duties (see Papal Master of the Horse, Prefecture of the Pontifical Household, Hereditary officers of the Roman Curia, Black Nobility). They also formed the ceremonial Noble Guard. In the first decades of the existence of the Vatican City State, executive functions were entrusted to some of them, including that of delegate for the State of Vatican City, now denominated president of the Commission for Vatican City. With the motu proprio Pontificalis Domus of March 1968, Pope Paul VI abolished the honorary positions that had continued to exist until then, such as Quartermaster general and Master of the Horse.

=== Head of state ===
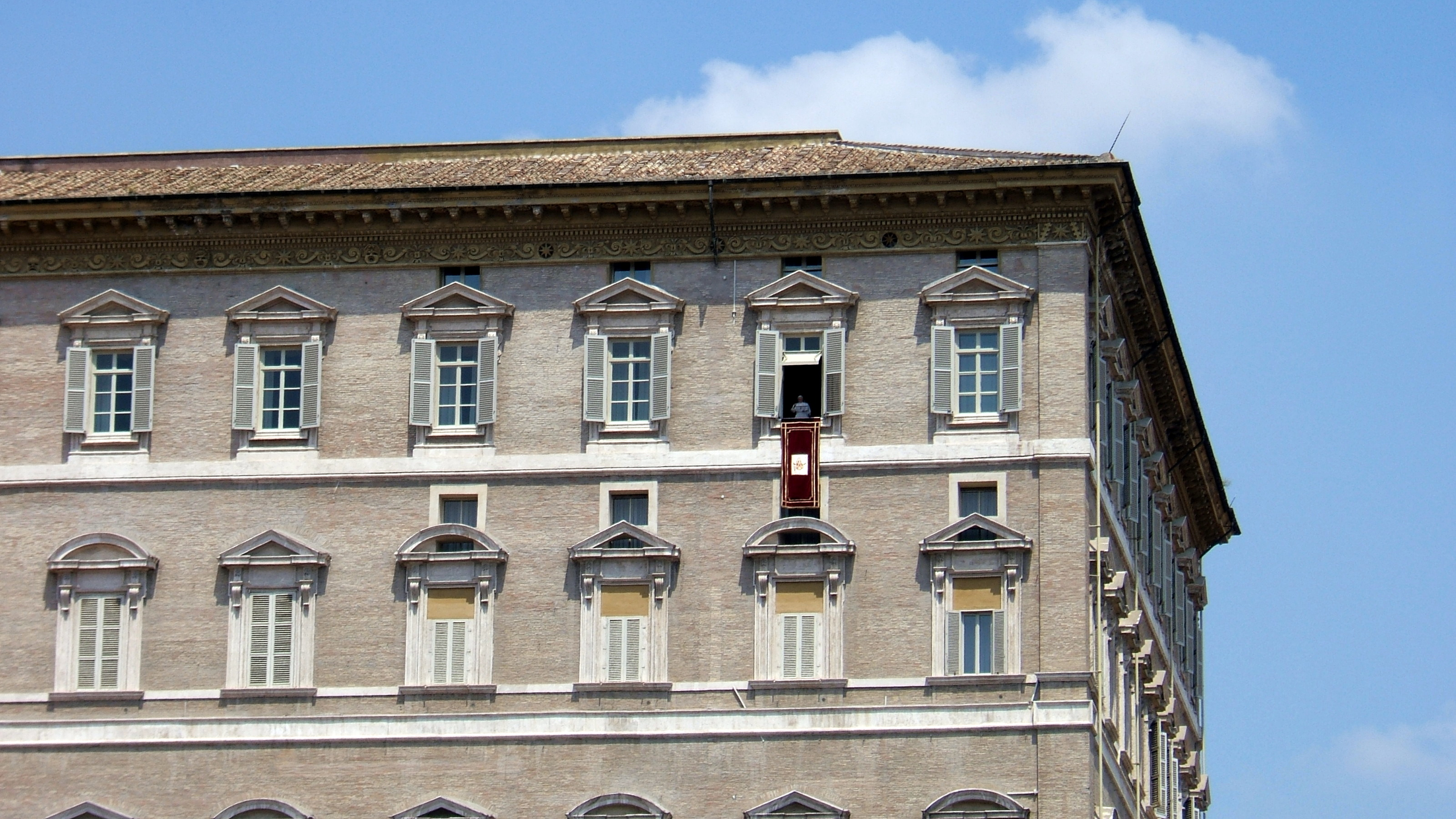
The Apostolic Palace (Palazzo Apostolico), the official residence of the pope. Here, Benedict XVI is at the window marked by a maroon banner hanging from the windowsill at centre.

As Vatican City is governed by the Holy See, the pope is ex officio the head of state, a function dependent on his primordial function as bishop of the diocese of Rome and head of the Catholic Church. The term "Holy See" refers not to the Vatican state but to the pope's spiritual and pastoral governance, largely exercised through the Roman Curia. His official title with regards to Vatican City is Sovereign of the State of the Vatican City.

Pope Leo XIV, born Robert Francis Prevost in Chicago, United States, was elected on 8 May 2025. His principal subordinate government official for Vatican City as well as the country's de facto head of government is the president of the Pontifical Commission for Vatican City State, who since 1952 exercises the functions previously belonging to the Governor of Vatican City. Since 2001, the president of the Pontifical Commission for Vatican City State also has the title of president of the Governorate of the State of Vatican City. The president is the Italian sister Raffaella Petrini, who was appointed by Pope Francis on 1 March 2025, and was reconfirmed by Pope Leo XIV on 9 May 2025.

=== Government and justice ===
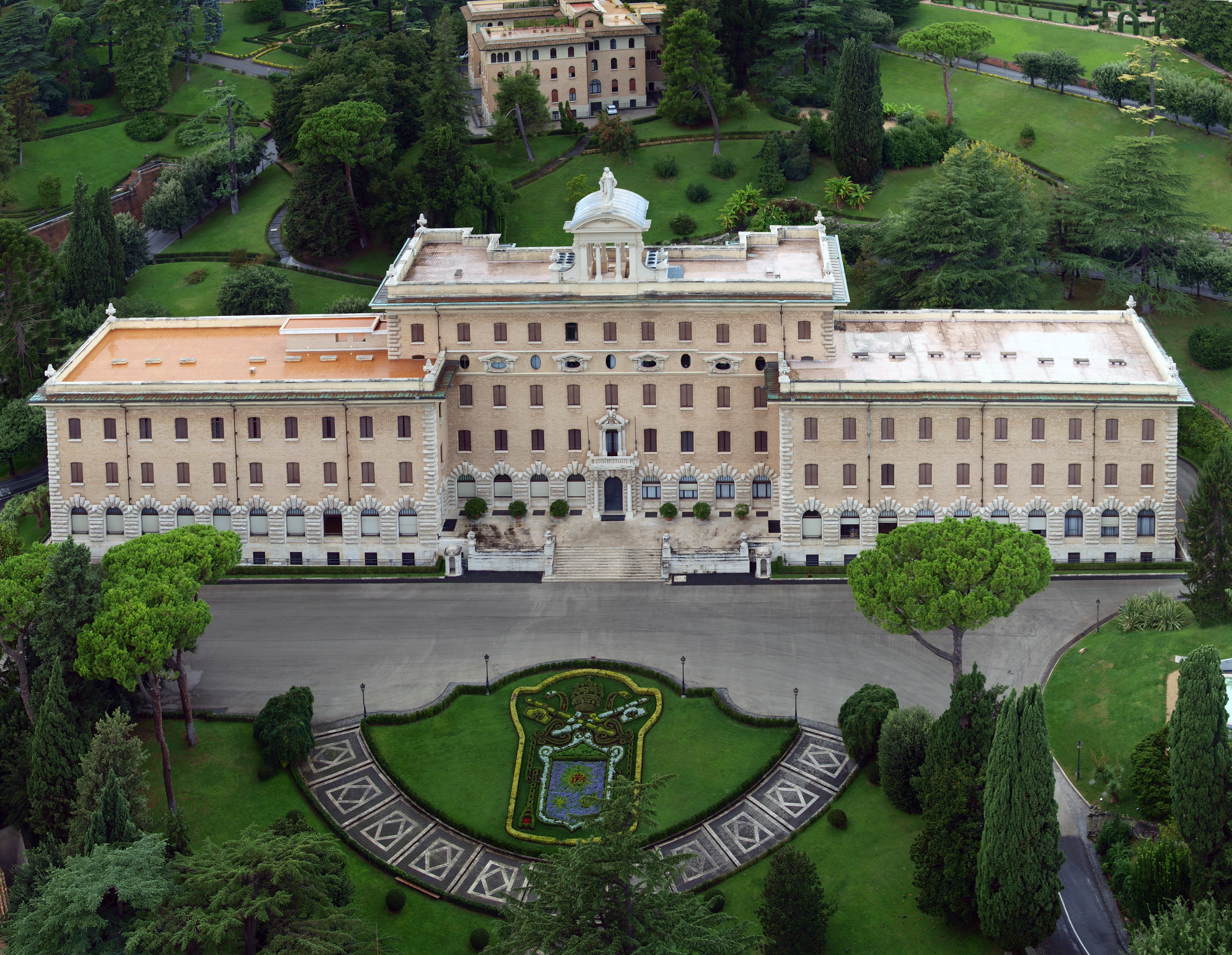
The Palace of the Governorate of Vatican City State

Legislative functions are administered by the pope, but are also delegated to the Pontifical Commission for Vatican City State, led by the president of the Pontifical Commission for Vatican City State. Its members are cardinals appointed by the pope for terms of five years.Acts of the commission must be approved by the Pope, through the Holy See's Secretariat of State, and must be published in a special appendix of the Acta Apostolicae Sedis.Most of the content of this appendix consists of routine executive decrees, such as approval for a new set of postage stamps.

Executive authority is delegated to the president of the Governorate of Vatican City, who is also the president of the Pontifical Commission. In addition, the Governorate include two immediate collaborators of the president: the general secretary and the deputy general secretary, members of the General Secretariat, each appointed by the pope for five-year terms. Important actions of the Governorate must be confirmed by the Pontifical Commission and by the Pope through the Secretariat of State.

Both the Pontifical Commission for Vatican City State and the president of the Governorate of Vatican City can be assisted by the councilors of Vatican City State in drafting legislation and other important issues. The president of the Governorate can convoke the members of the Council of Directors, together with external experts and people. The Governorate oversees the central governmental functions through several departments and offices. The directors and officials of these offices are appointed by the Pope for five-year terms.

The Governorate is organized into central offices, one for law and another for personnel matters, and directorates with roles in the following matters:

- Infrastructure and services
- Telecommunications and information systems
- Security and civil protection services
- Economy
- Health and hygiene
- Museums and cultural heritage
- Pontifical villas

There are subsidiary bodies for monetary, disciplinary, personnel and personnel selection matters.

In the pope's name, judiciary functions (Vatican judiciary) are exercised by four bodies: a Supreme Court, a Court of Appeal, a Tribunal and a Sole Judge, whose roles are established by the Vatican codes of criminal and civil procedure, and the 2013 "Motu Proprio On the Jurisdiction of Judicial Authorities of Vatican City State in Criminal Matters". At the Vatican's request, sentences imposed can be served in Italy (see the section on crime, below).

Due to obvious territorial constraints, many headquarters and offices of the Holy See are located on Italian territory. They are granted the same immunity as diplomatic missions thanks to the Lateran Treaty and are commonly defined as "extraterritorial areas".

=== National and public security ===
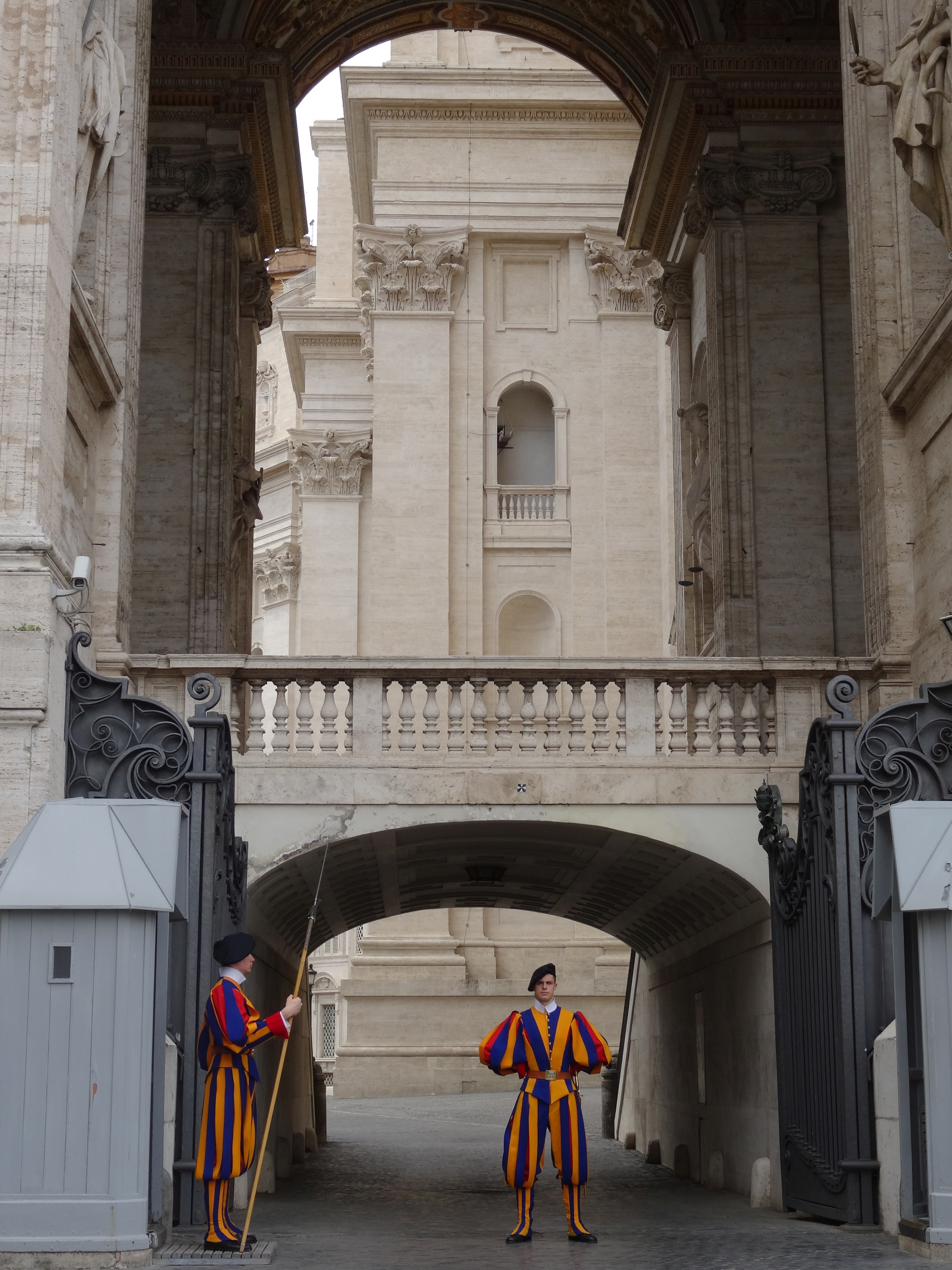
A guard of the Vatican at his sentry box

As Vatican City is an enclave within Italy, its military defence is provided by the Italian Armed Forces. There is no formal defence treaty with Italy, as Vatican City is a neutral state. Vatican City has no armed forces of its own, although the Swiss Guard is a military corps of the Holy See responsible for the personal security of the pope, and residents in the state. Soldiers of the Swiss Guard are entitled to hold Vatican City State passports and nationality.

Swiss mercenaries were historically recruited by popes as part of an army for the Papal States. The Pontifical Swiss Guard was founded by Pope Julius II on 22 January 1506 as the pope's personal bodyguard and continues to fulfill that function. It is listed in the Annuario Pontificio under "Holy See", not under "State of Vatican City". In 2005, the Guard had 134 members. Recruitment is arranged by a special agreement between the Holy See and Switzerland.

All recruits must be Catholic, unmarried males with Swiss citizenship who have completed their basic training with the Swiss Armed Forces with certificates of good conduct, be between the ages of 19 and 30, and be at least 174 cm (5 ft 9 in) in height. Members are equipped with small arms and the traditional halberd, and trained in bodyguarding tactics. Together with the Corps of Gendarmerie of Vatican City, the Swiss Guard have roles in the Italy-Vatican border control. The Palatine Guard and the Noble Guard, the last armed forces of the Vatican City State, were disbanded by Pope Paul VI in 1970.

The entire territory of Vatican City has been listed on the International Register of Cultural Property under Special Protection and, in 1984, among World Heritage Sites. Consequently, the Hague Convention for the Protection of Cultural Property in the Event of Armed Conflict provides international legal protection against armed conflicts. A large part of the historical documents of the very extensive Vatican Apostolic Archive is stored in the "Bunker", which was inaugurated in 1980. This facility is a two-storey reinforced concrete vault, under the Cortile della Pigna, equipped with systems for fire protection, climate and humidity control, and physical security.

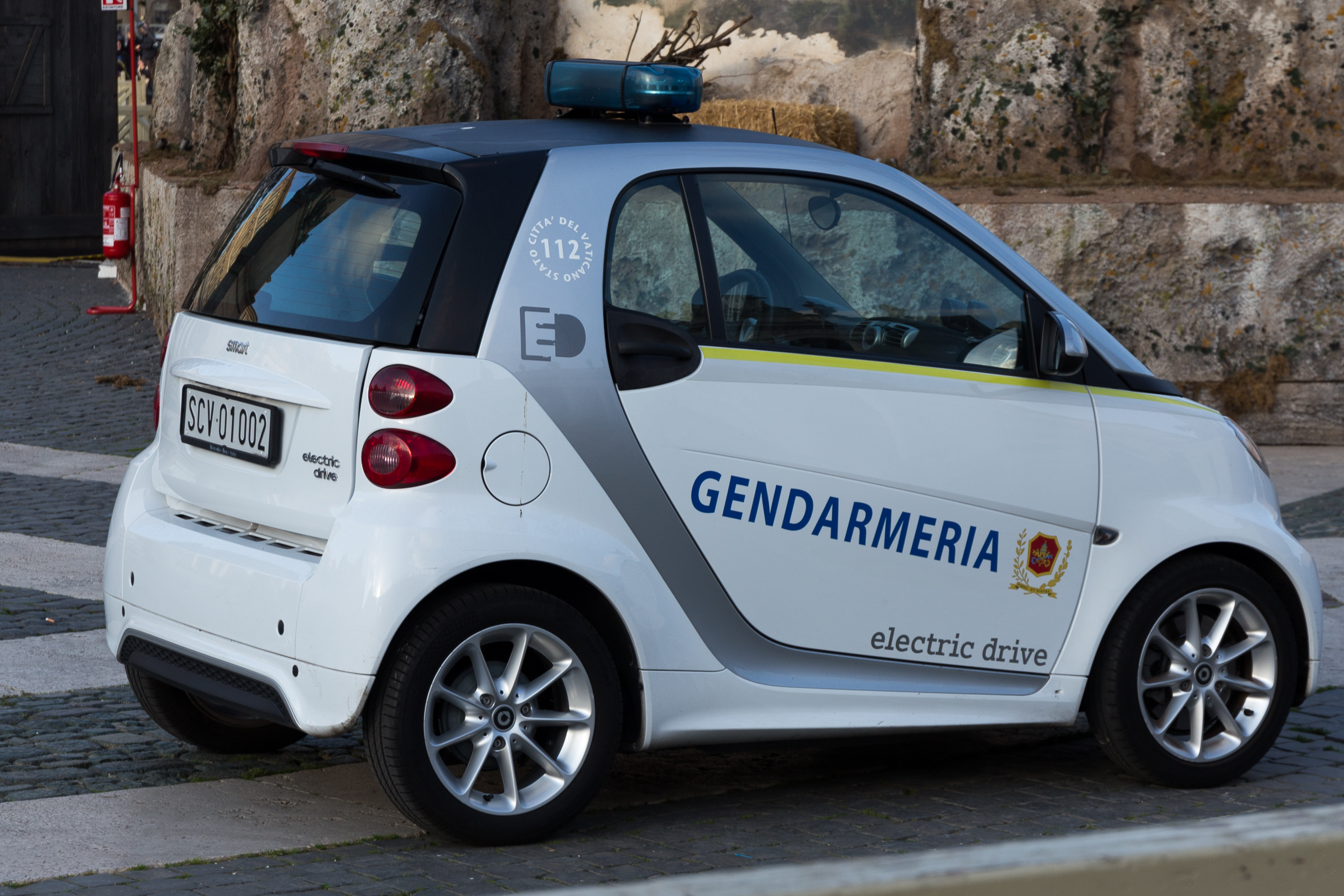
A Vatican gendarmerie car

Civil defence is the responsibility of the Corps of Firefighters of the Vatican City State, the national fire brigade. Dating its origins to the early nineteenth century, the Corps in its present form was established in 1941. It is responsible for fire fighting, and civil defence scenarios including flooding, natural disasters, and mass casualty incidents. The Corps is governmentally supervised through the Directorate for Security Services and Civil Defence, which is also responsible for the Gendarmerie (see below).

The Gendarmerie Corps (Corpo della Gendarmeria) is the gendarmerie, or police and security force, of Vatican City and the extraterritorial properties of the Holy See. The corps is responsible for security, public order, border control, traffic control, criminal investigation, and other general police duties in Vatican City including providing security for the pope outside Vatican City. The corps has 130 personnel and is a part of the Directorate for Security Services and Civil Defence (which also includes the Vatican Fire Brigade), an organ of the Governorate of Vatican City.

Even though St Peter's Square is part of Vatican territory, it is normally safeguarded by Italian police forces.

==== Crime ====
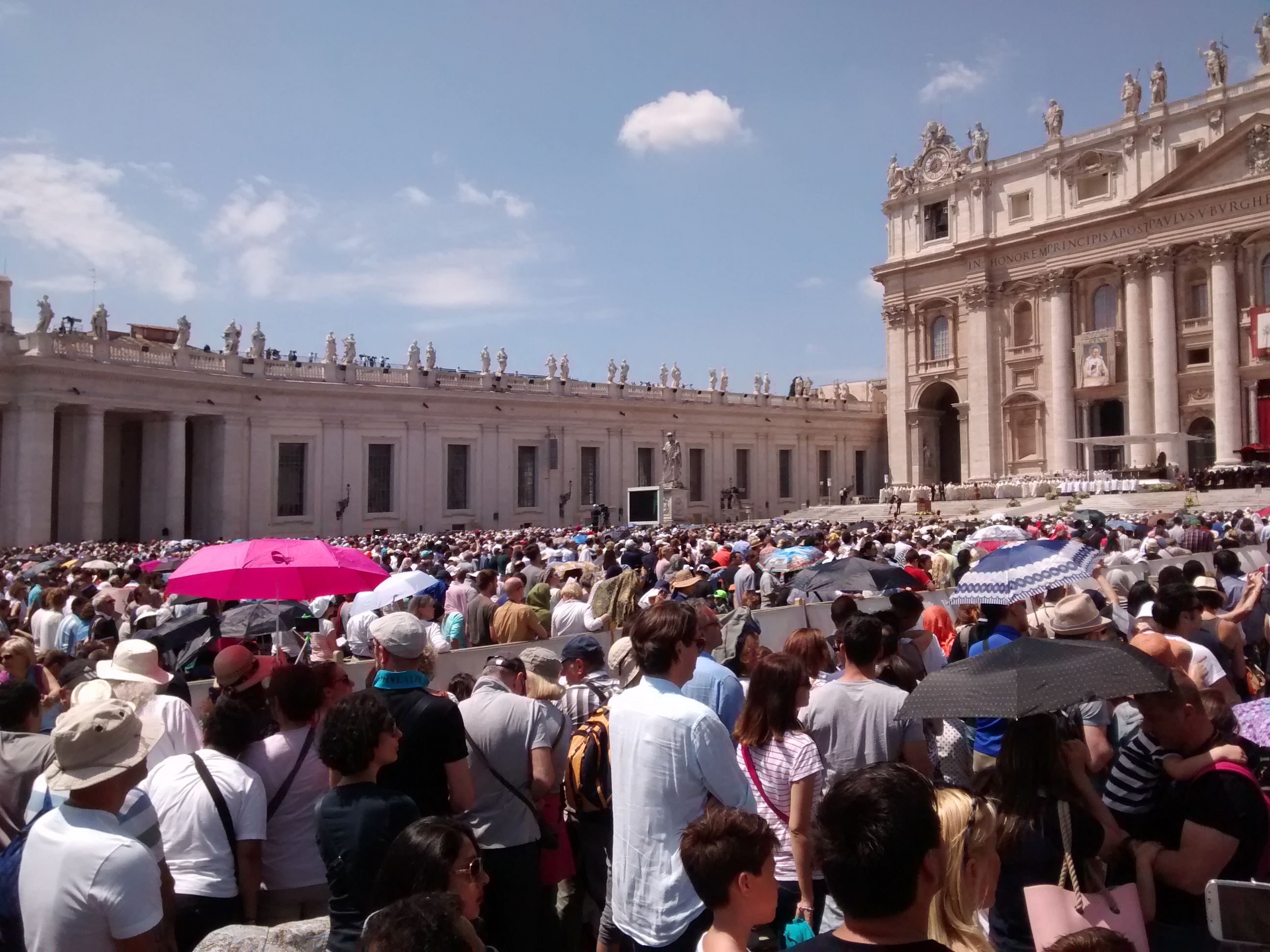
The crowds of tourists in St. Peter's Square are a target for pickpockets

Crime in Vatican City consists largely of purse snatching, pickpocketing and shoplifting by outsiders. The tourist foot-traffic in St Peter's Square is one of the main locations for pickpockets in Vatican City. If crimes are committed in the square, the perpetrators may be arrested and tried by the Italian authorities, since that area is normally patrolled by Italian police.

Under the Lateran Treaty, Italy will, at the request of the Holy See, punish individuals for crimes committed within the Vatican City and will itself proceed against the person who committed the offence, if that person takes refuge in Italian territory. Persons accused of crimes recognized as such both in Italy and in Vatican City that are committed in Italian territory will be handed over to the Italian authorities if they take refuge in the Vatican City or in buildings that enjoy immunity under the treaty.

The Vatican City has no prison system, apart from a few detention cells for pre-trial detention. People convicted of committing crimes in the Vatican serve terms in Italian prisons (Polizia Penitenziaria), with costs covered by the Vatican.

=== Foreign relations ===
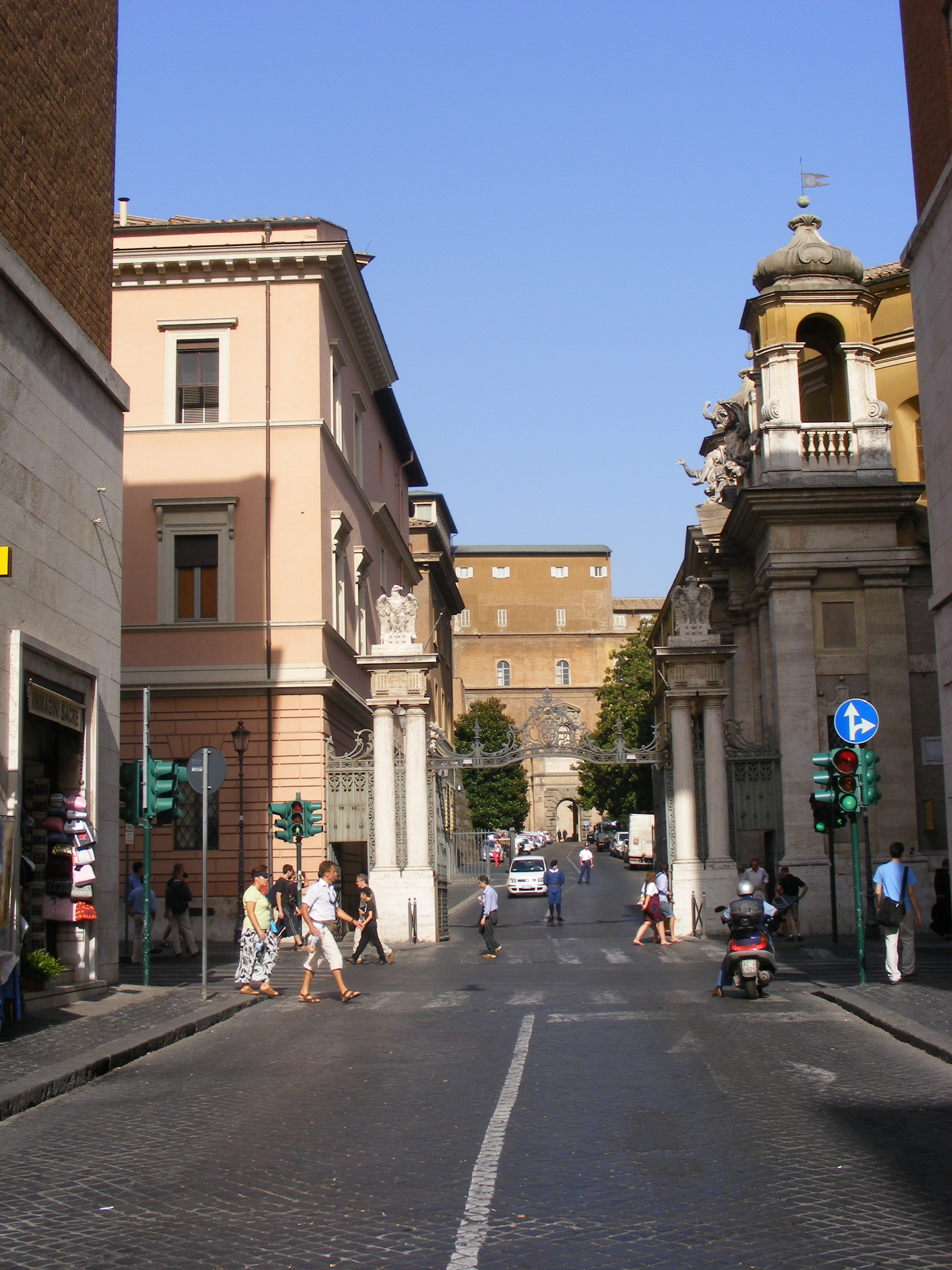
The Ingresso di Sant'Anna, an entrance to Vatican City from Italy

Vatican City State is a recognized national territory under international law. The Holy See conducts diplomatic relations on its behalf, in addition to the Holy See's own diplomacy, entering into international agreements in its regard. Vatican City thus has no diplomatic service of its own.

Because of space limitations, Vatican City is one of the few countries in the world that are unable to host embassies. Foreign embassies to the Holy See are located in Rome. Only during the Second World War were the staff of some embassies accredited to the Holy See given what hospitality was possible within the narrow confines of Vatican City – embassies such as that of the United Kingdom while Rome was held by the Axis powers and Germany's when the Allies controlled Rome.

The size of Vatican City is unrelated to the large global reach exercised by the Holy See as an entity quite distinct from the state.

Vatican City State itself participates in some international organizations whose functions relate to the state as a geographical entity, distinct from the non-territorial legal persona of the Holy See. These organizations are much less numerous than those in which the Holy See participates either as a member or with observer status. They include the following eight, in each of which Vatican City State holds membership:

- European Conference of Postal and Telecommunications Administrations (CEPT)
- European Telecommunications Satellite Organization (Eutelsat IGO)
- International Grains Council (IGC)
- International Institute of Administrative Sciences (IIAS)
- International Telecommunication Union (ITU)
- International Telecommunications Satellite Organization (ITSO)
- Interpol
- Universal Postal Union (UPU)

It also participates in:

- World Medical Association
- World Intellectual Property Organization (WIPO)

==== Non-party, non-signatory policy ====
A map of the United Nations member states

The Vatican City is not a member of the United Nations (UN), but the Holy See was granted observer status to the United Nations General Assembly in 1968; the only other country in a similar position is the State of Palestine. Since it is not a member of the UN, the Vatican City is not subjected to the jurisdiction of the International Court of Justice (ICJ). It engages with UN specialized agencies through its observer status, including the Central Emergency Response Fund, to which it contributed US$20,000 between 2006 and 2022.

The Vatican City State is not a member of the International Criminal Court (ICC). In Europe, only Belarus is also a non-party, non-signatory state. Monaco is a signatory state that has not ratified and Russia withdrew from it in 2016.

The Vatican City State is neither a member of the Council of Europe nor a party to the European Convention on Human Rights, thus is not subject to the European Court of Human Rights. Among European states, Belarus is also not a member, while Russia has ceased to be part of it after being expelled from the Council of Europe following the 2022 Russian invasion of Ukraine.

The OECD's "Common Reporting Standard" (CRS), aiming at preventing tax evasion and money laundering, has also not been signed. The Vatican City State has been criticized for money-laundering practices in the past decades. The only other country in Europe that has not agreed to sign the CRS is Belarus.

The Vatican City State is one of few countries in the world that do not provide any publicly available financial data to the International Monetary Fund.

== Economy ==
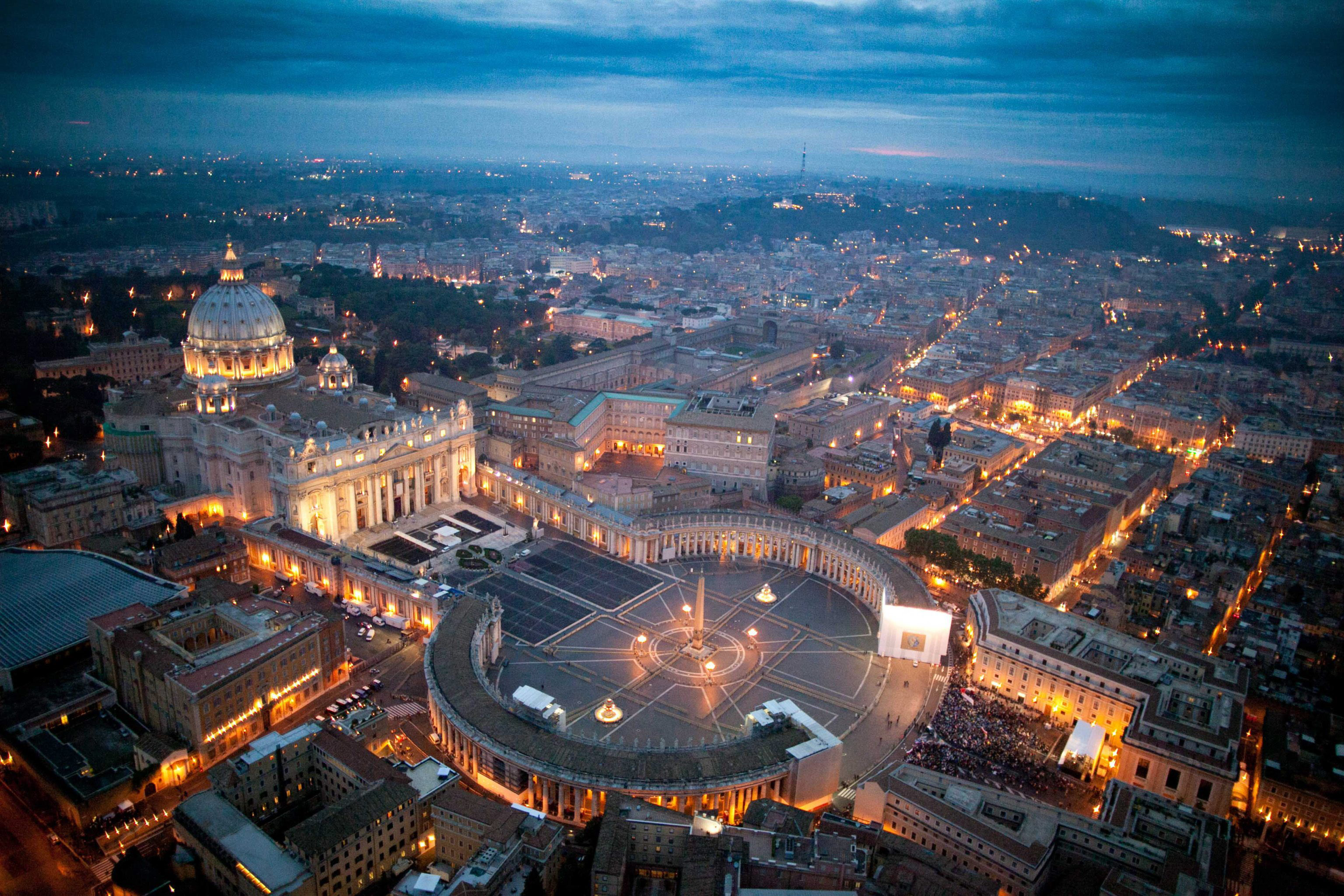
View of Vatican City in the evening

The Vatican City State budget includes the Vatican Museums and post office and is supported financially by the sale of stamps, coins, medals and tourist mementos; by fees for admission to museums; and by publications sales. (Note: The Holy See's budget, which is distinct from that of Vatican City State, is supported financially by a variety of sources, including investments, real estate income, and donations from Catholic individuals, dioceses, and institutions; these help fund the Roman Curia (Vatican bureaucracy), diplomatic missions, and media outlets. Moreover, an annual collection taken up in dioceses and direct donations go to a non-budgetary fund known as Peter's Pence, which is used directly by the Pope for charity, disaster relief and aid to churches in developing nations.) The incomes and living standards of lay workers are comparable to those of counterparts who work in the city of Rome. Other industries include printing, the production of mosaics, and the manufacture of staff uniforms.

The Institute for Works of Religion (IOR, Istituto per le Opere di Religione), also known as the Vatican Bank, is a financial agency situated in the Vatican that conducts worldwide financial activities. It has multilingual ATMs with instructions in Latin, possibly the only ATM in the world with this feature.

Vatican City issues its own coins and stamps. It has used the Euro as its currency since January 1999, owing to a special agreement with the European Union. Euro coins and notes were introduced on 1 January 2002 — the Vatican City does not issue euro banknotes. Issuance of euro-denominated coins is strictly limited by treaty. More coins than usual are allowed in a year with a new papacy. Because of their rarity, Vatican euro coins are highly sought by collectors. Until the adoption of the Euro, Vatican coinage and stamps were denominated in their own Vatican lira currency, which was on par with the Italian lira.

Vatican euro coins with images of Pope Francis and Pope Benedict XVI
€1-Vatican Franciscus-Revers

Vatican City State, which employs nearly 2,000 people, had a surplus of 6.7 million euros in 2007. It ran a deficit in 2008 of more than 15 million euros.

In 2012, the US Department of State's International Narcotics Control Strategy Report listed Vatican City for the first time among the nations of concern for money-laundering, placing it in the middle category, which includes countries such as Ireland, but not among the most vulnerable countries, which include the United States itself, Germany, Italy, and Russia.

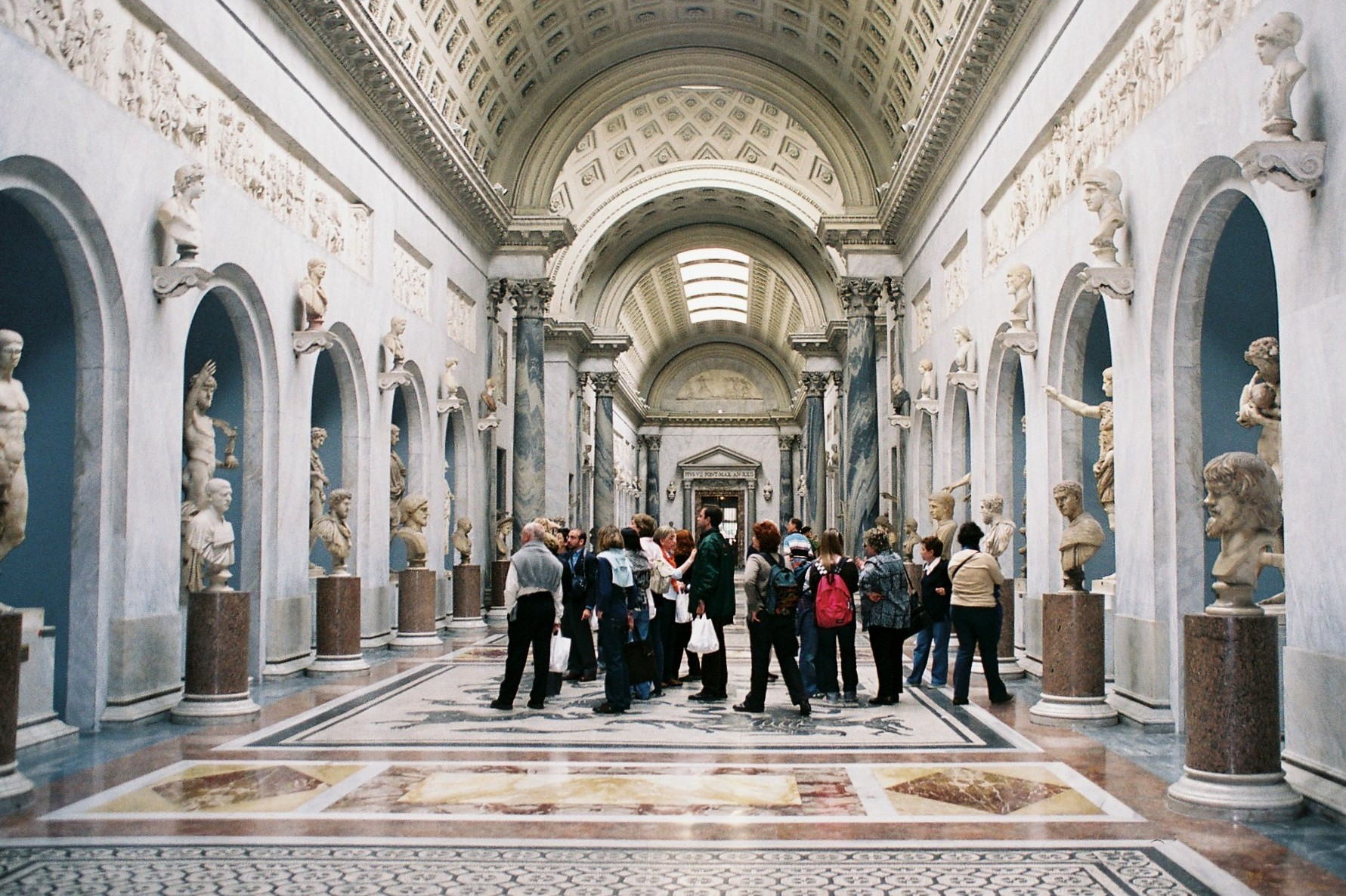
Vatican Museums' "New Wing", built by Raffaele Stern (1774–1820)

In February 2014, the Vatican announced it was establishing a secretariat for the economy, to be responsible for all economic, financial, and administrative activities of the Holy See and the Vatican City State, headed by Cardinal George Pell. This followed the charging of two senior clerics including a monsignor with money-laundering offences. Pope Francis appointed an auditor-general authorized to carry out audits of any agency at any time and engaged a US financial services company to review the Vatican's 19,000 accounts, to ensure compliance with international money-laundering practices. The pontiff appointed the Administration of the Patrimony of the Apostolic See as the Vatican's central bank, with responsibilities similar to other central banks around the world.

In 2022, the Vatican planned to release NFTs of its museum collection.

=== Transport ===
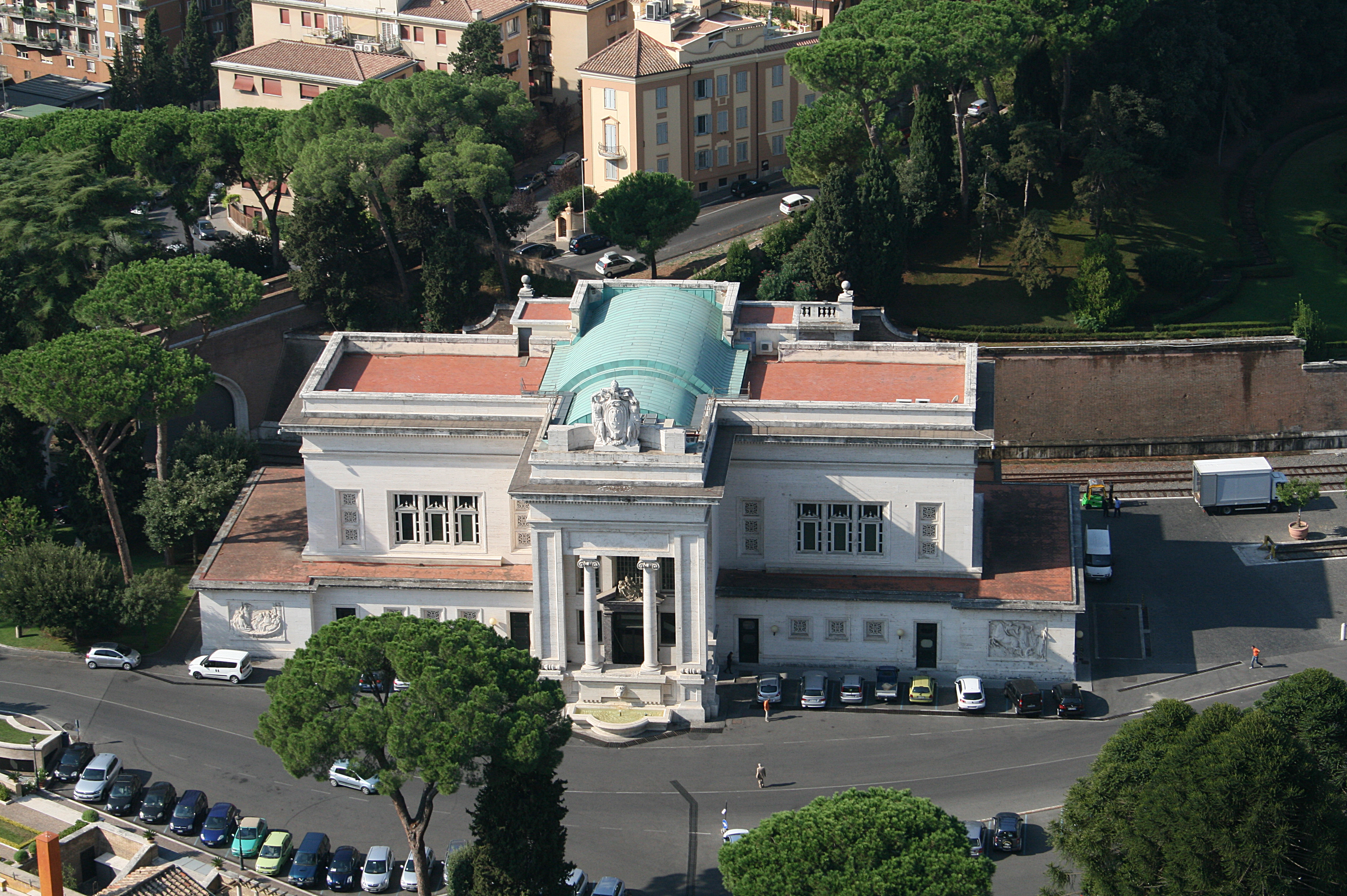
The shortest national railway system in the world

The Vatican City has a reasonably well-developed transport network considering its size, consisting mostly of a piazza and walkways. As a state that is 1.05 kilometres (1,150 yards) long and 0.85 km (930 yd) wide, it has a small transportation system, with no airports or highways.

The only aviation facility in Vatican City is the Vatican City Heliport. Vatican City is one of the few independent countries without an airport, and is served by the airports that serve the city of Rome, Leonardo da Vinci-Fiumicino Airport and to a lesser extent Ciampino Airport.

There is a standard gauge Vatican Railway and a Vatican City railway station, mainly used to transport freight. It is connected to Italy's network at Rome's Roma San Pietro railway station by an 852-metre-long (932 yd) spur, 300 metres (330 yd) of which is within Vatican territory. Pope John XXIII was the first pope to use the railway. Pope John Paul II rarely used it.

The closest metro station is Ottaviano – San Pietro – Musei Vaticani.

=== Telecommunications and mass media ===
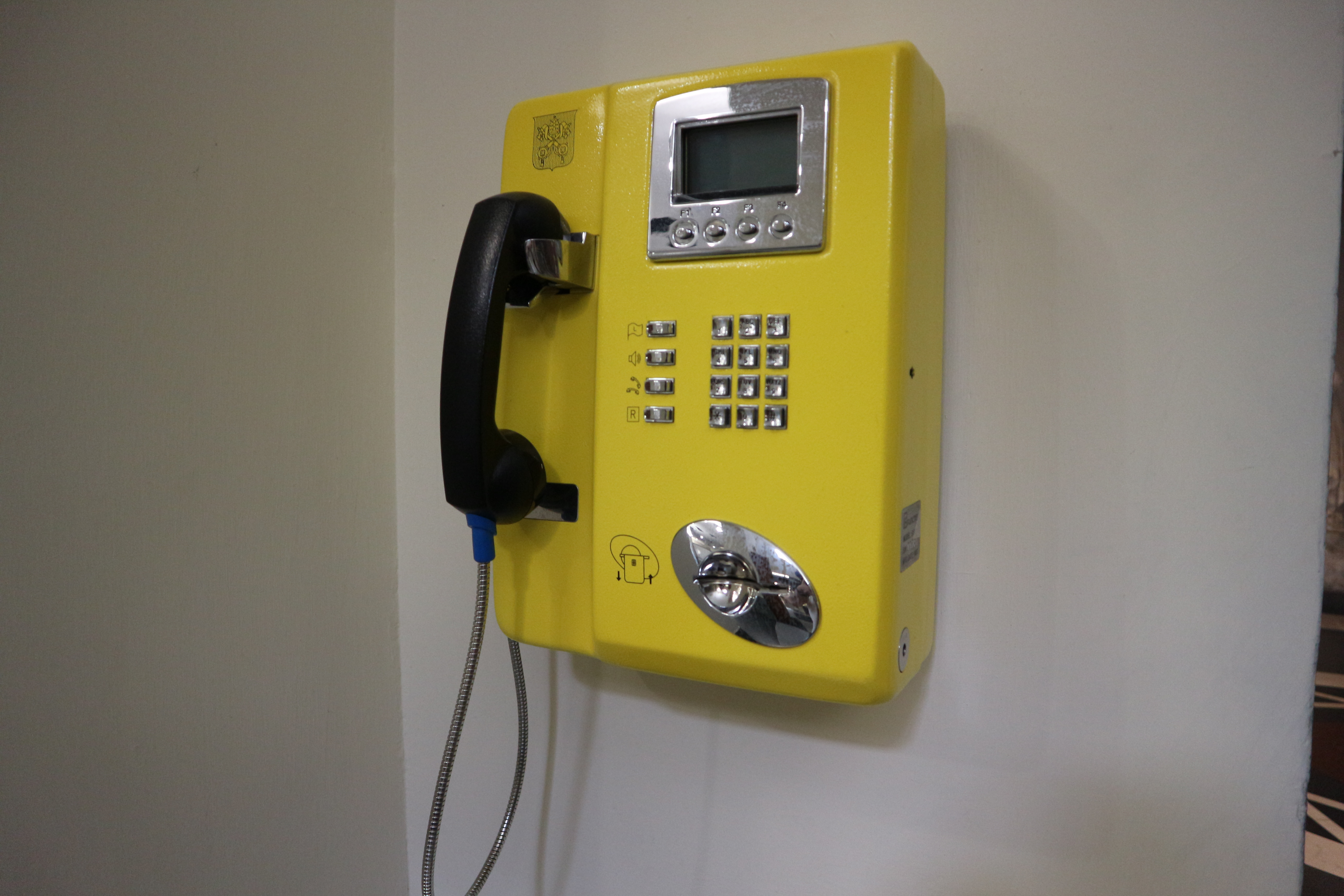
A pay phone in the Vatican City

The City is served by an independent, modern telephone system named the Vatican Telephone Service.

The Vatican controls its own Internet top-level domain, which is registered as (.va). Broadband service is widely provided within Vatican City. Vatican City has a radio ITU prefix, HV, and this is sometimes used by amateur radio operators.

In 2015, Vatican News web portal, L'Osservatore Romano daily newspaper, Vatican Radio and Vatican Media (formerly Vatican Television Center) were brought together under the Dicastery for Communication, which is now the single point of reference of the Holy See for communication. Other institutions managed by the Dicastery for Communication are the Vatican Printing Press (founded in 1587), the Vatican Publishing House (founded in 1926) and the Vatican Film Archive.

Vatican Radio, which was organized by Guglielmo Marconi, broadcasts on short-wave, medium-wave and FM frequencies and on the Internet. Its main transmission antennae are located in Italian territory, and exceed Italian environmental protection levels of emission. For this reason, the Vatican Radio has been sued. Photo, audio and video services are provided through another entity, Vatican Media.

L'Osservatore Romano is the multilingual semi-official newspaper of the Holy See. It is published by a private corporation under the direction of Catholic laymen, but reports on official information. The official texts of documents are in the Acta Apostolicae Sedis, the official gazette of the Holy See, which has an appendix for documents of the Vatican City State.

=== Postal service ===
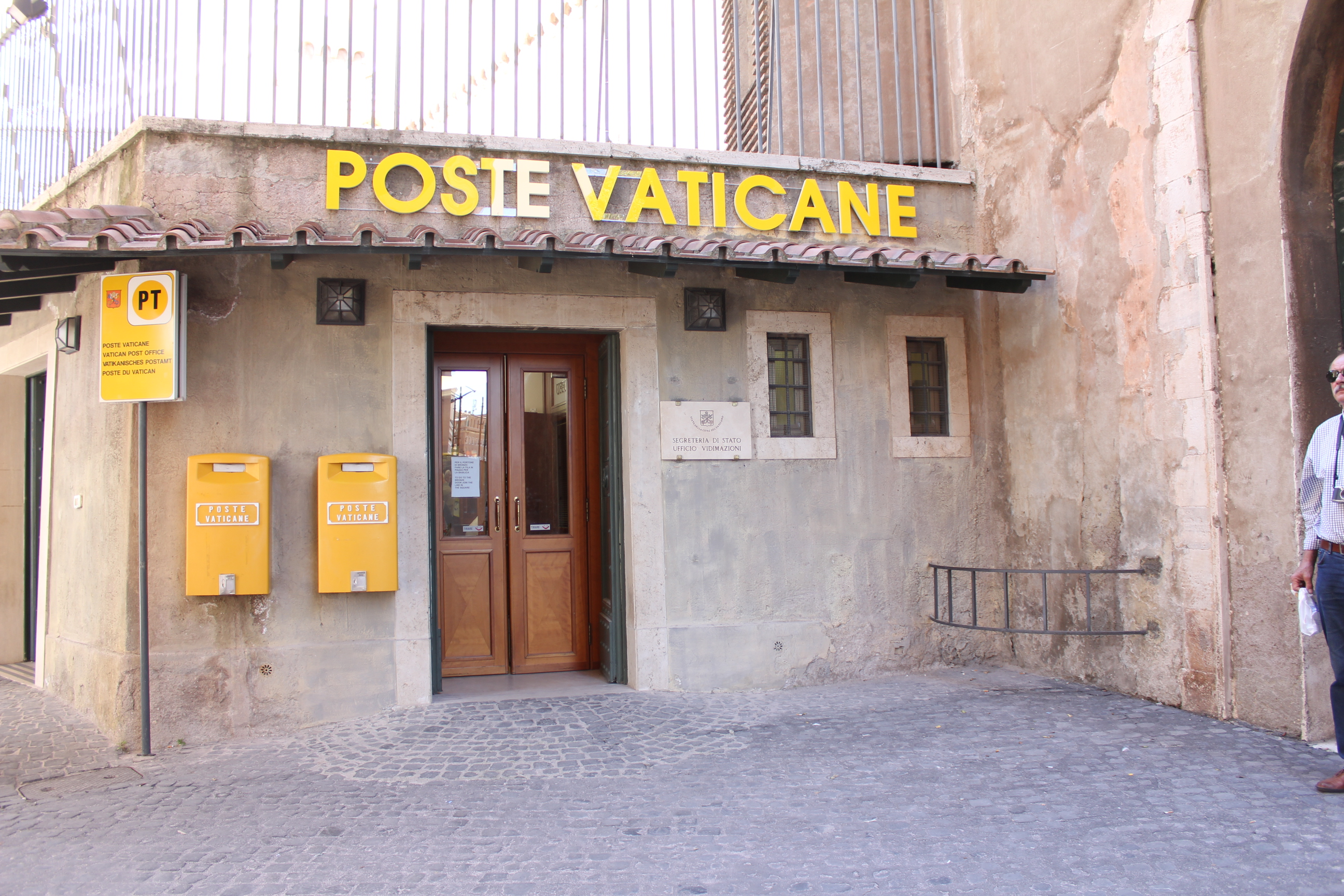
Vatican City's post office was established in February 1929.

A postal system (Poste Vaticane) was created on 13 February 1929. On 1 August, the state started to release its own postal stamps, under the authority of the Philatelic and Numismatic Office of the Vatican City State. The city's postal service is sometimes said to be "the best in the world", and faster than the postal service in Rome.

The international postal country code prefix is SCV. The postal code is 00120 – altogether SCV-00120.

=== Sustainability ===
In 2008, the Vatican began an "ecological island" for renewable waste and has continued the initiative throughout the papacy of Francis. These innovations included, for example, the installation of a solar power system on the roof of the Paul VI Audience Hall. In July 2019, it was announced that Vatican City would ban the use and sale of single-use plastics as soon as its supply was depleted, well before the 2021 deadline established by the European Union. It is estimated that 50–55% of Vatican City's municipal solid waste is properly sorted and recycled, with the goal of reaching the EU standard of 70–75%.

== Demographics ==
As of 2024 Vatican City has a population of 882 residents, regardless of citizenship. There are 372 Vatican citizens residing elsewhere, consisting of diplomats of the Holy See to other countries and cardinals residing in Rome.

The population is composed of clergy, other religious members, laypeople serving the state (such as the Swiss Guard) and their family members. In 2013, there were 13 families of the employees of the Holy See living in Vatican City. In 2019, there were 20 children of the Swiss Guards living at the Vatican. All citizens, residents, and places of worship in the city are Catholic. The city receives thousands of tourists and workers every day.

Vatican City population on 31 December 2024
Citizenship	Vatican		other
Residency	other	Vatican City	
Pope		1	
Cardinals	56	10	
Diplomats	316		
Swiss Guard		104	
Others		131	636
Total	618		636
Total	372	246	636
Total	372	882	
Total	1,254		

Vatican City population on 1 March 2011
Sex	all			male			female		
Citizenship	Vatican		other	Vatican		other	Vatican		other
Residency	other	Vatican City		other	Vatican City		other	Vatican City	
Pope		1			1				
Cardinals	43	30		43	30				
Diplomats	306			306					
Swiss Guard		86			86				
Other religious		50	197		49	102		1	95
Other lay		56	24		25	3		31	21
Total	572		221	540		105	32		116
Total	349	223	221	349	191	105		32	116
Total	349	444		349	296			148	
Total	793			645			148		

=== Languages ===
The Seal of Vatican City. Note the use of the Italian language

Vatican City has no formally enacted official language, but, unlike the Holy See which most often uses Latin for the authoritative version of its official documents, Vatican City uses only Italian in its legislation and official communications. Italian is the everyday language used by most of those who work in the state. In the Swiss Guard, Swiss German is the language used for giving commands. Individual guards take their oath of loyalty in their own languages: German, French, Italian or Romansh. The official websites of the Holy See and of Vatican City are primarily in Italian, with versions of their pages in a large number of languages, to varying extents.

=== Citizenship ===
Unlike citizenship of other states, which is based either on jus sanguinis (birth from a citizen, even outside the state's territory) or on jus soli (birth within the territory of the state), citizenship of Vatican City is granted on jus officii, namely on the grounds of appointment to work in a certain capacity in the service of the Holy See. This includes Cardinals resident either within Vatican City or elsewhere in Rome, diplomats of the Holy See, and any other person resident in Vatican City due to their occupation. It usually ceases upon the cessation of the appointment. Citizenship is extended to the spouse and children of a citizen, provided that they are living together in the city. Some individuals are authorized to reside in the city but do not qualify or choose not to request citizenship. Anyone who loses Vatican citizenship and does not possess other citizenship automatically becomes an Italian citizen, as provided in the Lateran Treaty.

According to Vatican citizenship law, only the Pope holds Vatican citizenship for life.

The Holy See, not being a country, issues only diplomatic and service passports, whereas Vatican City issues ordinary passports for its citizens.

=== Statistical oddities ===
In statistics comparing countries in per capita or per area metrics, Vatican City is often an outlier – these stem from the state's small size and ecclesiastical function. For example, as most of the roles which would confer citizenship are reserved for men, the gender ratio of Vatican City citizenship is several men per woman. Further oddities are petty crimes against tourists, resulting in a very high per-capita crime rate, and the city-state leading the world in per-capita wine consumption due to its sacramental use. A jocular illustration of these anomalies is sometimes made by calculating a "popes per km^{2}" statistic, which is greater than two because Vatican City is less than half a square kilometre in area.

A 360-degree view from the dome of St. Peter's Basilica, looking over the Vatican's Saint Peter's Square (centre) and out into Rome, showing Vatican City in all directions

== Culture ==
=== Cultural heritage ===
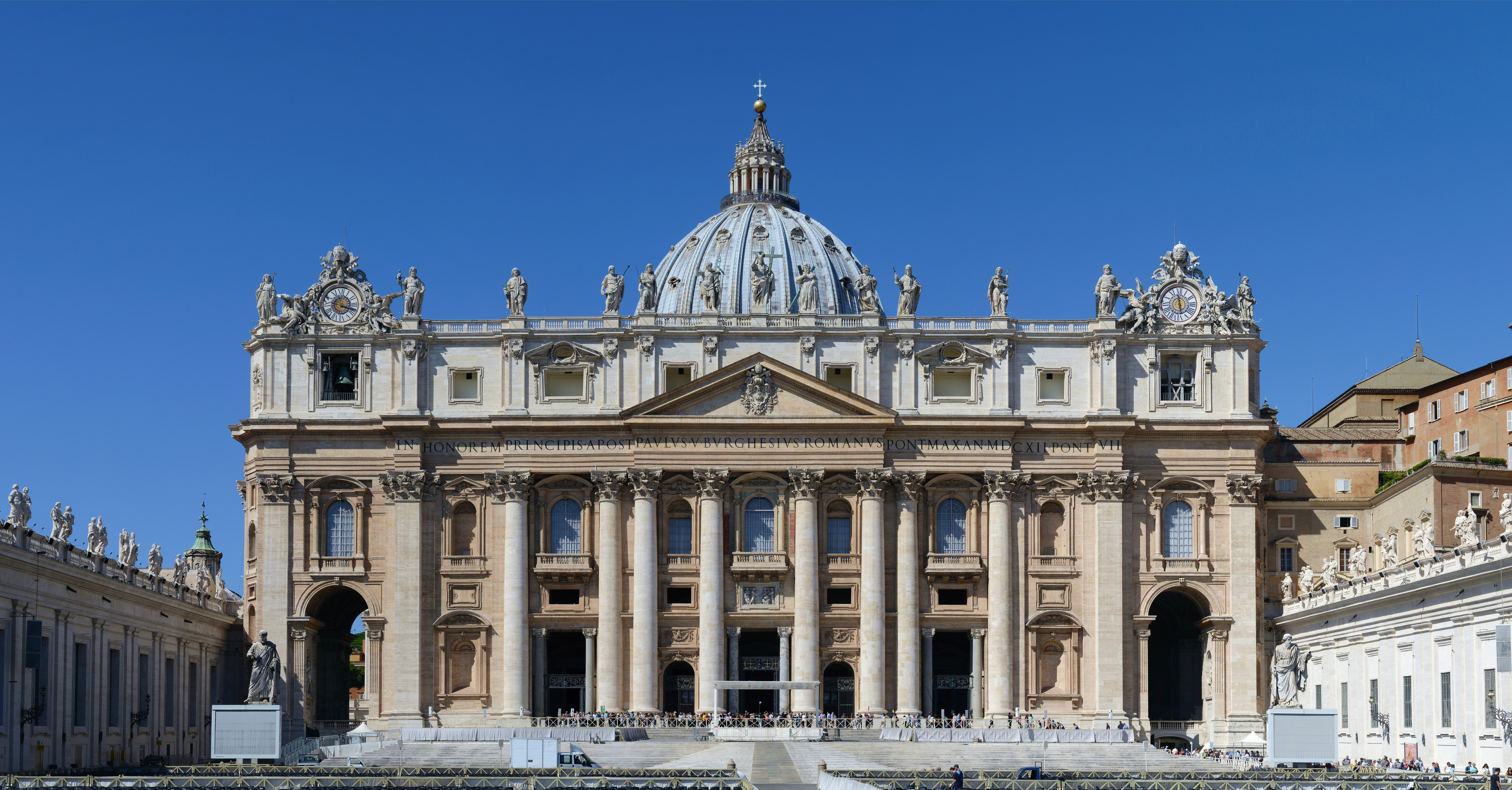
St. Peter's Basilica is one of the most renowned works of Renaissance architecture

The Vatican City is home to some of the most famous art in the world. St Peter's Basilica, designed by a succession of architects including Bramante, Michelangelo, Giacomo della Porta, Carlo Maderno and Gian Lorenzo Bernini, is a renowned work of Renaissance architecture. The Sistine Chapel is famous for its frescos, which include works by Perugino, Domenico Ghirlandaio and Sandro Botticelli, as well as the ceiling and Last Judgment by Michelangelo. The interiors of the Vatican were decorated by artists including Raphael and Fra Angelico.

The Vatican Apostolic Library and the collections of the Vatican Museums are of the highest historical, scientific and cultural importance. Added by UNESCO to the List of World Heritage Sites in 1984, the Vatican is the only site to consist of an entire state. It is the only UNESCO site registered as a centre containing monuments in the "International Register of Cultural Property under Special Protection" according to the 1954 Hague Convention for the Protection of Cultural Property in the Event of Armed Conflict.

=== Science ===
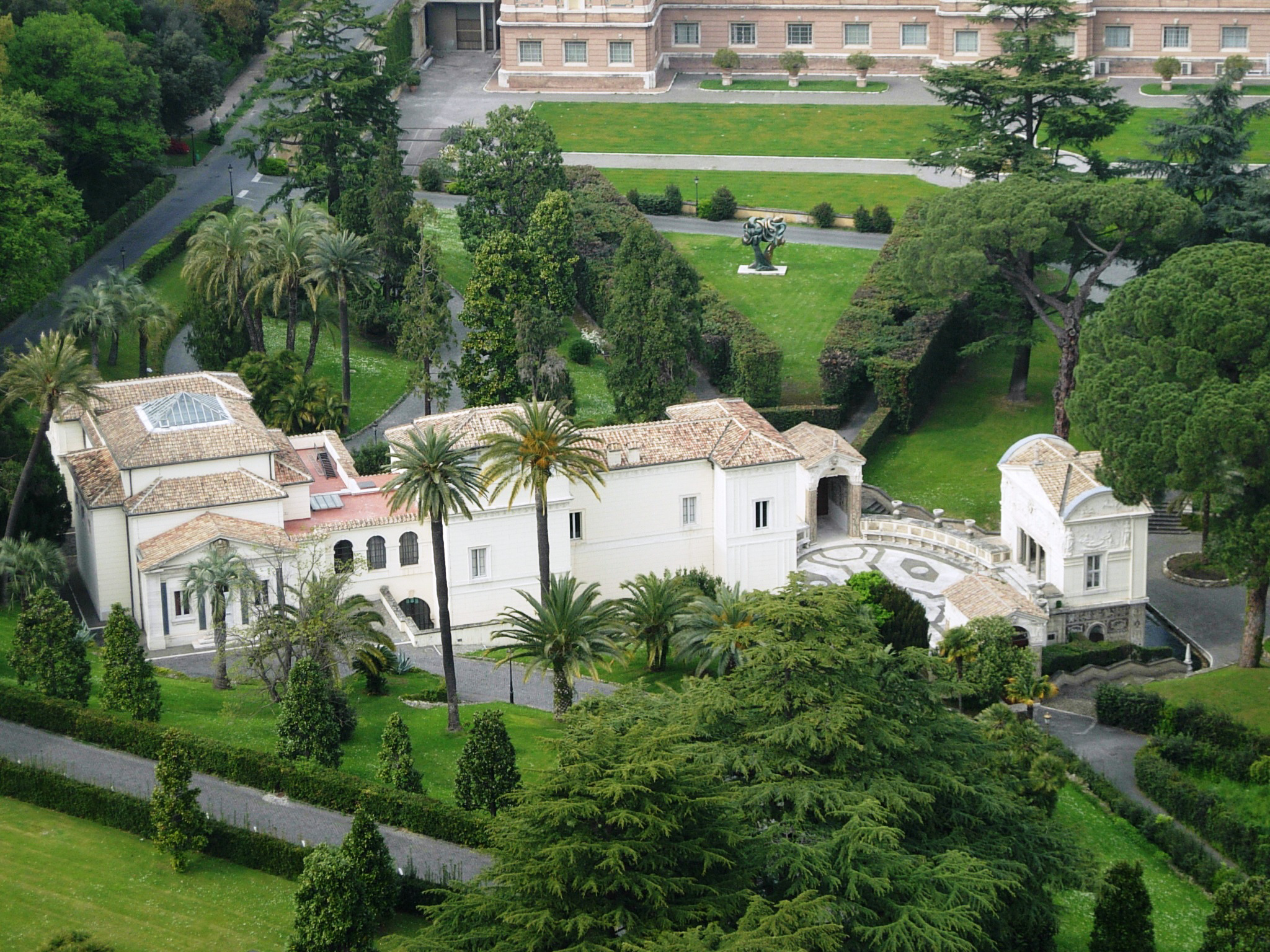
The Pontifical Academy of Sciences and the Casina Pio IV

Following in the footsteps of the Pontifical Academy of New Lincei founded by Pope Pius IX in 1847, Pope Pius XI founded the Pontifical Academy of Sciences in 1936. Located in the Casina Pio IV, it brings together scientists who made contributions to mathematical, physical and natural sciences, and medicine. It also focuses on epistemological issues and the history of science. Among the academicians, there are or were the astrophysicist Martin John Rees, the mathematician Cédric Villani, the theoretical physicist Edward Witten, the Nobel Prize in Chemistry laureates Jennifer Doudna and Emmanuelle Charpentier, and Ernest Rutherford, the geneticists Luigi Luca Cavalli-Sforza and Francis Collins, the head transplant pioneer Robert J. White, and Nobel Prize in Physiology or Medicine laureate Alexander Fleming.

The Pontifical Academy of Social Sciences is another pontifical academy of the Holy See located in the Vatican City. The seat of the Pontifical Academy for Life, which deals with bioethics and ethics of technology, is at San Callisto complex, a Vatican extraterritorial property.

The Vatican Observatory, whose origins date back to the 16th century, continues to contribute to astronomical research, especially through a partnership with the University of Arizona and the infrared and optical Vatican Advanced Technology Telescope in Arizona, and to astronomical education and "popular science" projects. As a member of the International Astronomical Union and the International Center for Relativistic Astrophysics, it deals with research on cosmological models, stellar classification, binary stars, and nebulae. It has contributed to philosophical interdisciplinary studies at the Center for Theology and the Natural Sciences in Berkeley, California and research on the history of astronomy thanks to its extensive library, which includes a meteorite collection.

The first telescopes of the Vatican Observatory in the Gardens of Vatican City and near St. Peter's Basilica were among those used to create the Carte du Ciel, but they progressively became useless for research purposes due to light pollution in the 1930s. Consequently, Pope Pius XI moved the observatory to the Vatican extraterritorial Palace of Castel Gandolfo.

=== Sport ===
The Vatican City is not a member of the International Olympic Committee and does not compete in the Olympic Games, though it has participated in some international sporting events, including the World Cycling Championships, the Championships of the Small States of Europe and the Mediterranean Games. Vatican City has its own athletics association, Athletica Vaticana.

Football in Vatican City is organized by the Vatican Amateur Sports Association, which holds the national championship, called the Vatican City Championship, with eight teams, including, for example, the Swiss Guard's FC Guardia and police and museum guard teams. The association organizes the Coppa Sergio Valci and the Vatican Supercoppa. It controls the Vatican City national football team, which is neither affiliated with UEFA nor FIFA.

== See also ==
- Architecture of Vatican City
- Holy city
- Index of Vatican City-related articles
- Law of Vatican City
- Vatican News
- Outline of Vatican City
- Timeline of fictional stories set in Vatican City
