= Outline of Vatican City =

City-state and enclave within Rome, Italy

The Flag of Vatican City

The Coat of arms of Vatican City

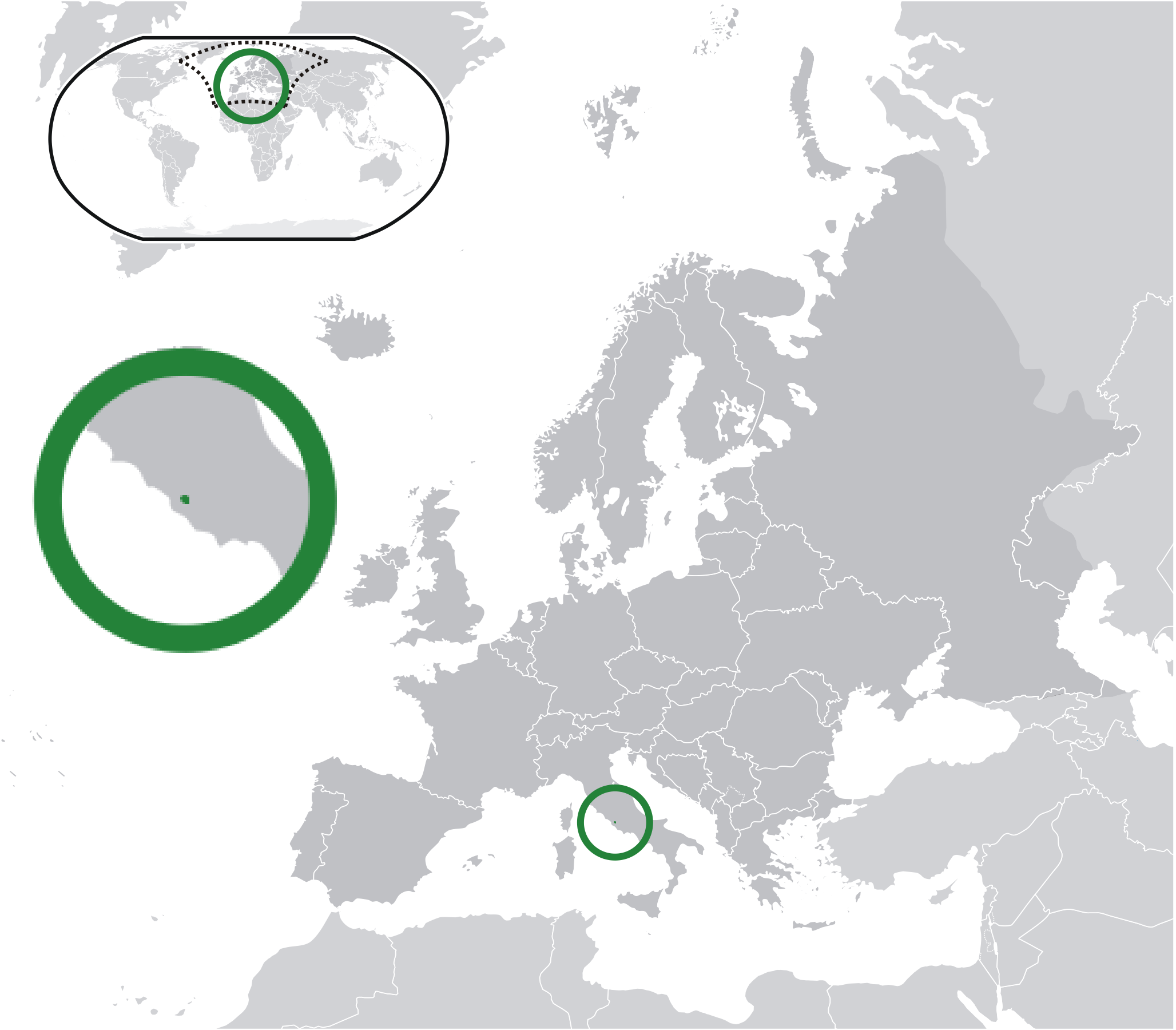
The location of Vatican City within Europe.

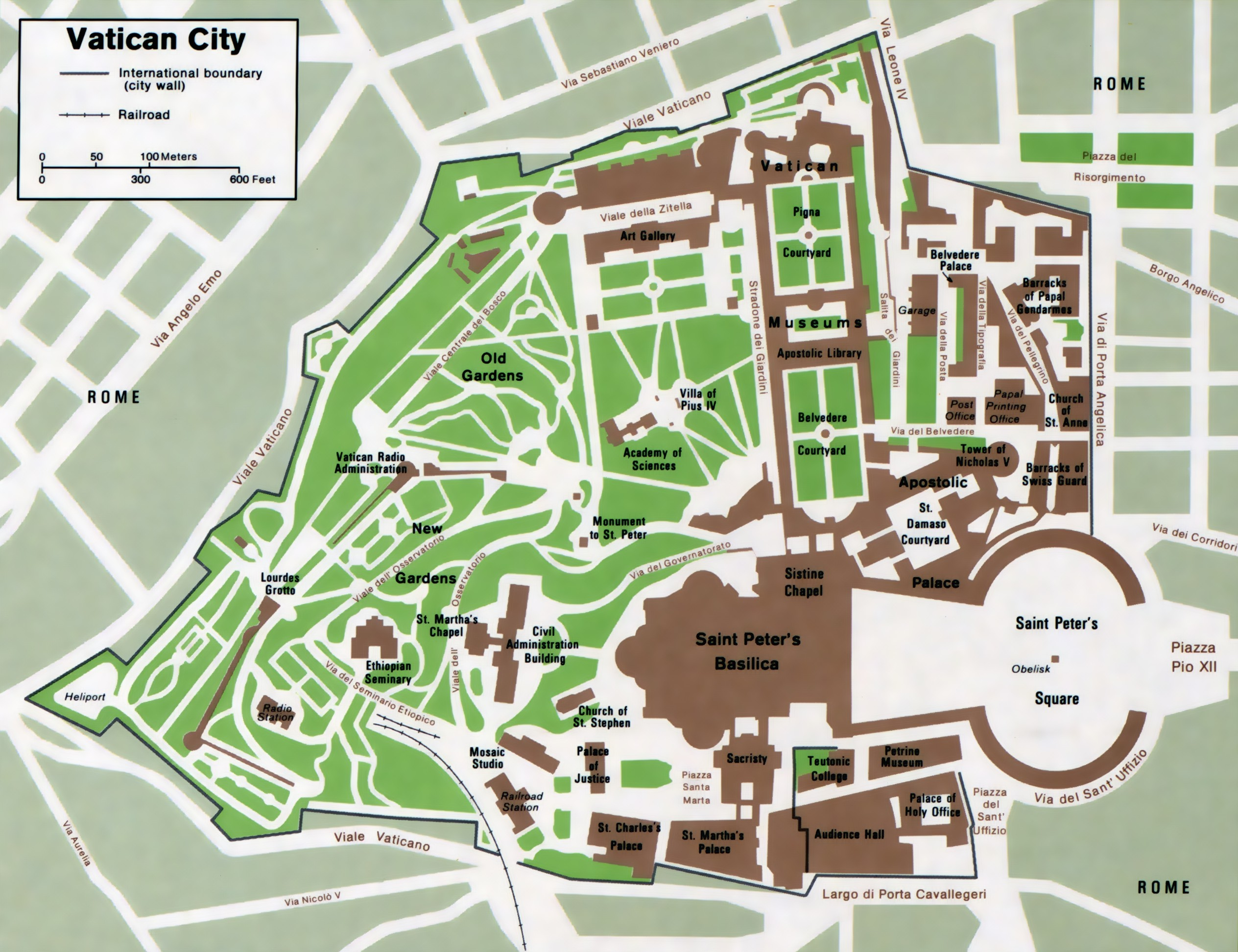
An enlargeable map of Vatican City State, including extraterritorial properties of the Holy See bordering Vatican City.

The following outline is provided as an overview of and introduction to Vatican City:

Vatican City – an ecclesiastical or sacerdotal-monarchical state, being the sovereign territory of the Holy See and ruled by the Bishop of Rome—the Pope, the leader of the worldwide Catholic Church. The territory of this landlocked sovereign city-state consists of a walled enclave within the city of Rome, Italy. It has an area of approximately 49 hectares (121 acres) (Note: The De Agostini Atlas Calendar listed the area of Vatican City as 0.44 km^{2} in its 1930 edition but corrected it to 0.49 km^{2} in its 1945–46 edition. The figure of 0.44 km^{2} is still widely cited by many sources despite its inaccuracy.) and a population of about 825. (Note: 453 residents and 372 nonresident citizens.) This makes Vatican City the smallest independent state in the world by both area and population.

== General reference ==
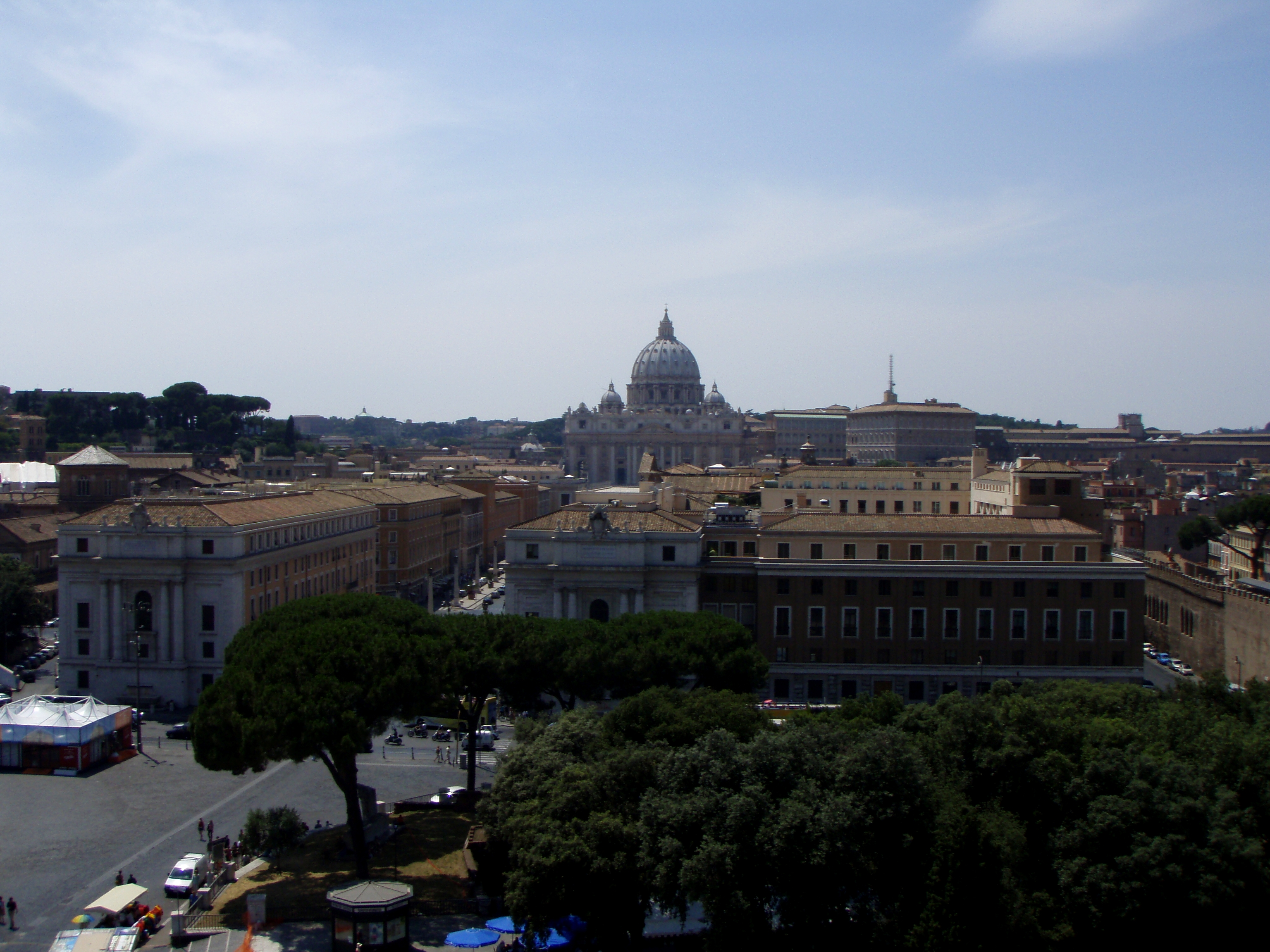
View of Vatican City from the Castel Sant'Angelo in Rome.

- Pronunciation: /ˈvætɪkən/
- Common English country name: Vatican City
- Official English country name: Vatican City State
- Common endonym(s): Vatican City State
- Official endonym(s): Stato della Città del Vaticano (pronounced [ˈstaːto della tʃitˈta ddel vatiˈkaːno]),
- Adjectival(s): Vatican
- Demonym(s): Citizen of Vatican City
- Etymology: See Vatican Hill
- ISO country codes: VA, VAT, 336
- ISO region codes: none
- Internet country code top-level domain: .va

== Geography of Vatican City ==
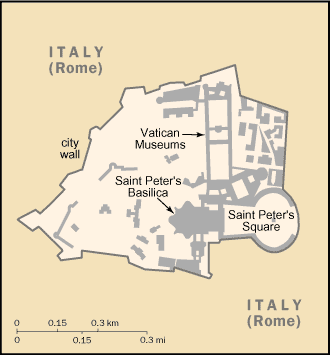
An enlargeable map of Vatican City.

Geography of Vatican City

- Vatican City is:
  - A walled enclave within the city of Rome
  - A sovereign city-state
  - A European microstate
- Land boundaries: Italy 3.2 km
- Coastline: none
- Population: 825 (2019) - 240th
- Size: 0.49 square kilometres (0.19 sq mi) - 258th
- Atlas of Vatican City

=== Location of Vatican City ===
- Vatican City is situated within the following regions:
  - Eastern Hemisphere
  - Northern Hemisphere
    - Eurasia
      - Europe
        - Southern Europe
          - Italian Peninsula
            - Surrounded by Italy
              - Surrounded by Lazio
                - Surrounded by Rome
  - Time zone: Central European Time (UTC+01), Central European Summer Time (UTC+02)
- Extreme points of Vatican City
  - High: unnamed location 75 m (246 ft)
  - Low: Saint Peter's Square 33 m (108 ft)

=== Environment of Vatican City ===
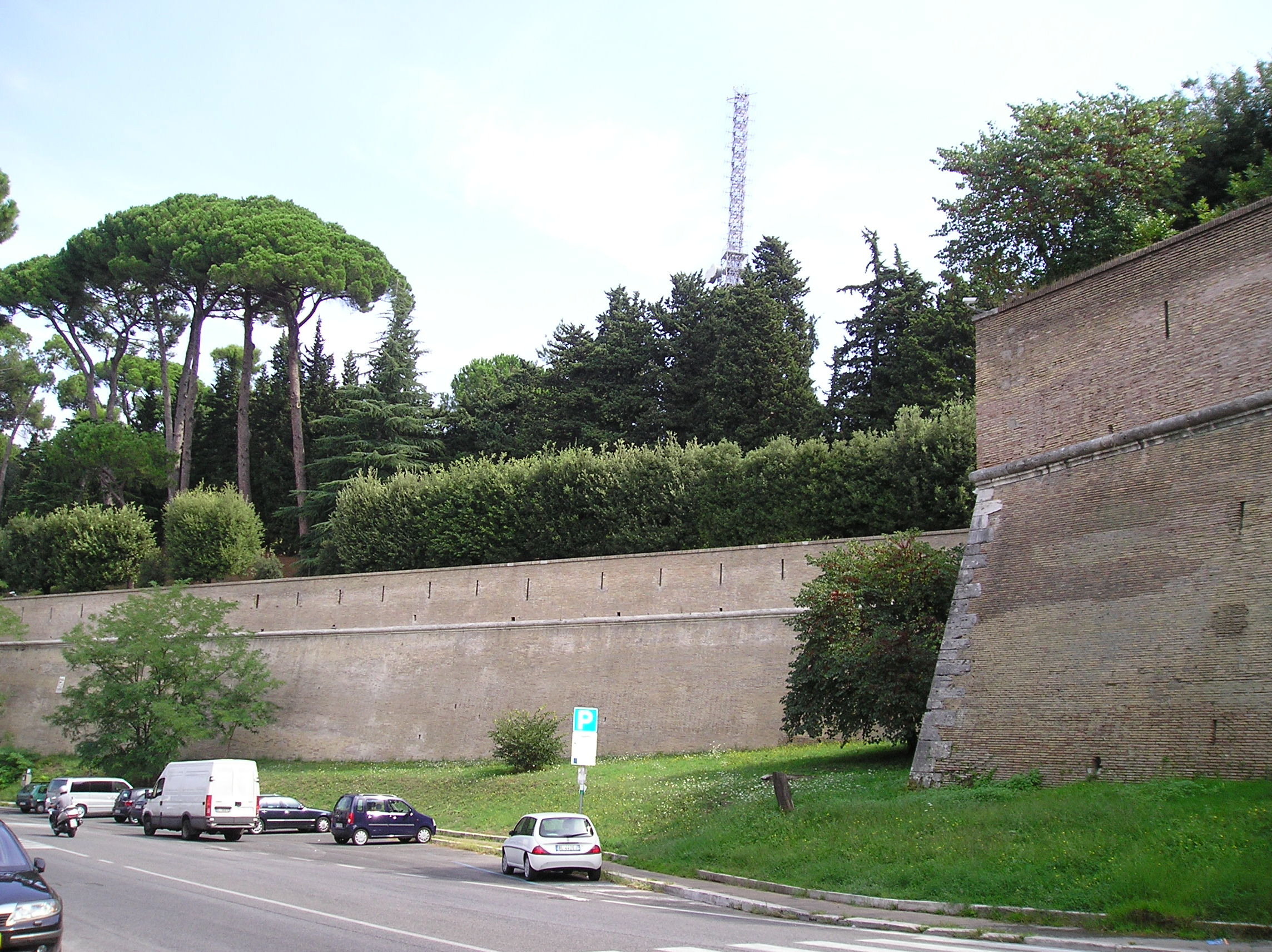
A section of the wall in Vatican City, from the outside, behind the Vatican Gardens.

- Climate of Vatican City
- Ecoregions in Vatican City: none
- Protected areas of Vatican City: none
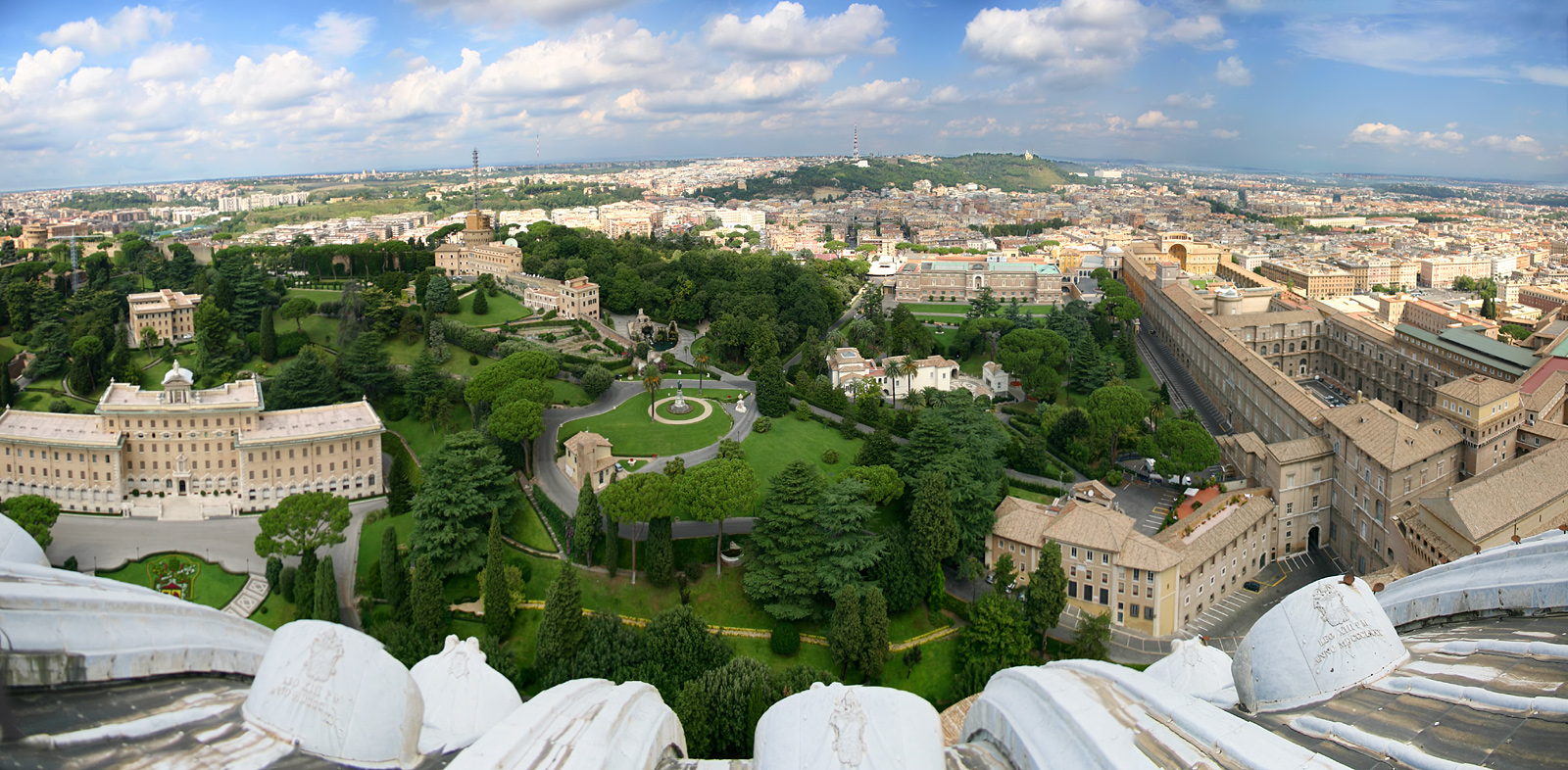
View of the Vatican Gardens from the dome of St. Peter's Basilica. (The Vatican Museums can be seen to the right).

==== Natural geographic features of Vatican City ====
Vatican City is an enclave in an urban area, and lacks the geographic features common to (much larger) countries:

- Lakes: none
- Mountains: none
- Rivers: none
- Valleys: none
- World Heritage Sites in Vatican City: Vatican City is itself a World Heritage Site

=== Regions of Vatican City ===
- None
- Vatican City is inside Rome, which in turn lies within the Lazio region of Italy
- Vatican City lies next to the Borgo district in Rome.

==== Ecoregions of Vatican City ====
- None

==== Administrative divisions of Vatican City ====
- Vatican City has no administrative divisions.

=== Demography of Vatican City ===
Demographics of Vatican City

== Government and politics of Vatican City ==
Politics of Vatican City

- Form of government: Ecclesiastical; sacerdotal-monarchical; absolute monarchy; elective monarchy; elective theocracy (disputed application).
- Capital: Vatican City
- Association of Vatican Lay Workers
- Elections in Vatican City
- Political parties in Vatican City: none. Vatican City is in the jurisdiction of the Holy See, which has absolute authority over it.
- Political scandals of Vatican City
  - Banco Ambrosiano
  - Gone with the Wind in the Vatican
  - Roman Question
- Vatican Apostolic Archive

=== Branches of the government of Vatican City ===
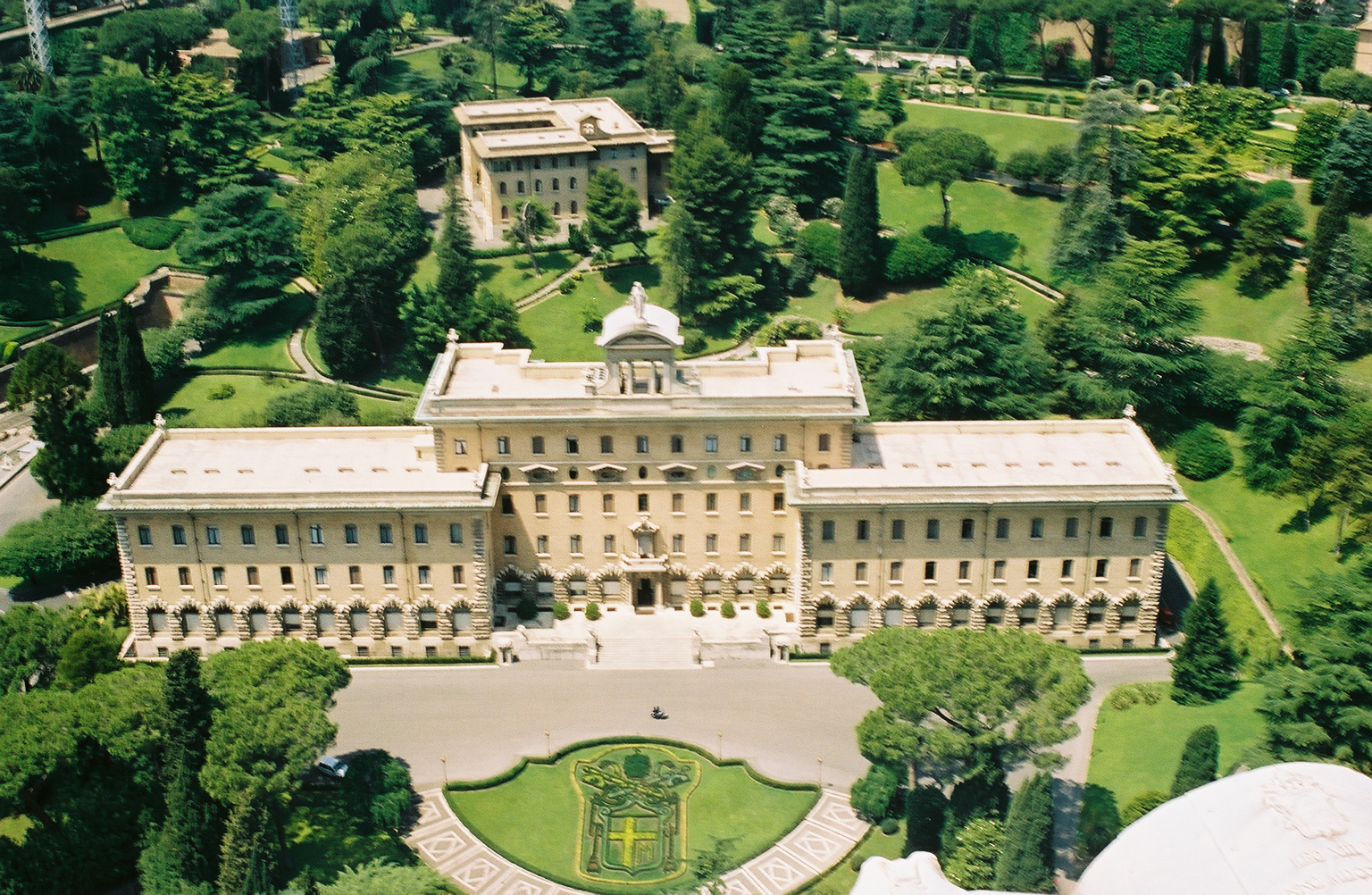
Palace of the Governatorate, Vatican City.

Government of Vatican City

==== Executive branch of the government of Vatican City ====
- Head of state: Pope, currently Leo XIV
- De facto head of government: President of the Governatorate of Vatican City, Giuseppe Bertello
- Governatorate of Vatican City

==== Legislative branch of the government of Vatican City ====
- Absolute legislative authority: Pope, currently Leo XIV
  - Secretariat of State
    - Pontifical Commission for Vatican City State
      - President of the Pontifical Commission for Vatican City State: Giovanni Lajolo
      - Laws passed by the Commission must be approved by the pope through the Secretariat of State prior to being published and taking effect.

==== Judicial branch of the government of Vatican City ====
- Absolute judicial authority: Pope, currently Leo XIV
  - Supreme Court of Vatican City (Corte di Cassazione)
    - The Cardinal Prefect of the Apostolic Signatura serves ex officio as the President of the Supreme Court of Vatican City (Corte di Cassazione). The two other members of the Supreme Court are also Cardinals of the Apostolic Signatura and are chosen by the Cardinal Prefect on a yearly basis.
  - Appellate Court of Vatican City
  - Tribunal of Vatican City State
  - Under the terms of article 22 the Lateran Treaty, Italy will, at the request of the Holy See, punish individuals for crimes committed within Vatican City and will itself proceed against the person who committed the offence, if that person takes refuge in Italian territory. Persons accused of crimes recognized as such both in Italy and in Vatican City that are committed in Italian territory will be handed over to the Italian authorities if they take refuge in Vatican City or in buildings that under the treaty enjoy immunity.

=== Foreign relations of Vatican City ===
- Foreign relations of Vatican City – Vatican City State is a recognised national territory under international law, but it is the Holy See that conducts diplomatic relations on its behalf, in addition to the Holy See's own diplomacy, entering into international agreements in its regard. See also Foreign relations of the Holy See
- Diplomatic missions in Vatican City: none (Vatican City maintains diplomatic relations with no one, only the Holy See does. See below).
  - Because Vatican City is too small, diplomatic missions accredited to the Holy See are situated in Rome, not in Vatican City.
    - Diplomatic missions to the Holy See
- Diplomatic missions of Vatican City: none. (See below).
  - The Holy See, which Vatican City is the sovereign territory of, maintains diplomatic relations with 176 countries.
    - Diplomatic missions of the Holy See

==== International organization membership ====
International organization membership of Vatican City Vatican City State is a member of:

- Council of Europe (CE) (observer)
- International Atomic Energy Agency (IAEA)
- International Criminal Police Organization (Interpol)
- International Organization for Migration (IOM) (observer)
- International Telecommunication Union (ITU)
- International Telecommunications Satellite Organization (ITSO)
- International Trade Union Confederation (ITUC)
- Nonaligned Movement (NAM) (guest)
- Organization for Security and Cooperation in Europe (OSCE)
- Organisation for the Prohibition of Chemical Weapons (OPCW)
- Organization of American States (OAS) (observer)
- Unione Latina (observer)
- United Nations (UN) (permanent observer)
- United Nations Conference on Trade and Development (UNCTAD)
- United Nations High Commissioner for Refugees (UNHCR)
- Universal Postal Union (UPU)
- World Federation of Trade Unions (WFTU)
- World Intellectual Property Organization (WIPO)
- World Tourism Organization (UNWTO) (observer)
- World Trade Organization (WTO) (observer)

=== Law and order in Vatican City ===
Law of Vatican City State

- Constitution: Fundamental Law of Vatican City State
- Capital punishment in Vatican City: abolished in 1969
- Crime in Vatican City (committed mostly by tourists)
- Human rights in Vatican City
  - LGBT rights in Vatican City
- Lateran Treaty
- Law enforcement in Vatican City

=== Military in Vatican City ===
Vatican City State has no military, but resident within it is the Swiss Guard.

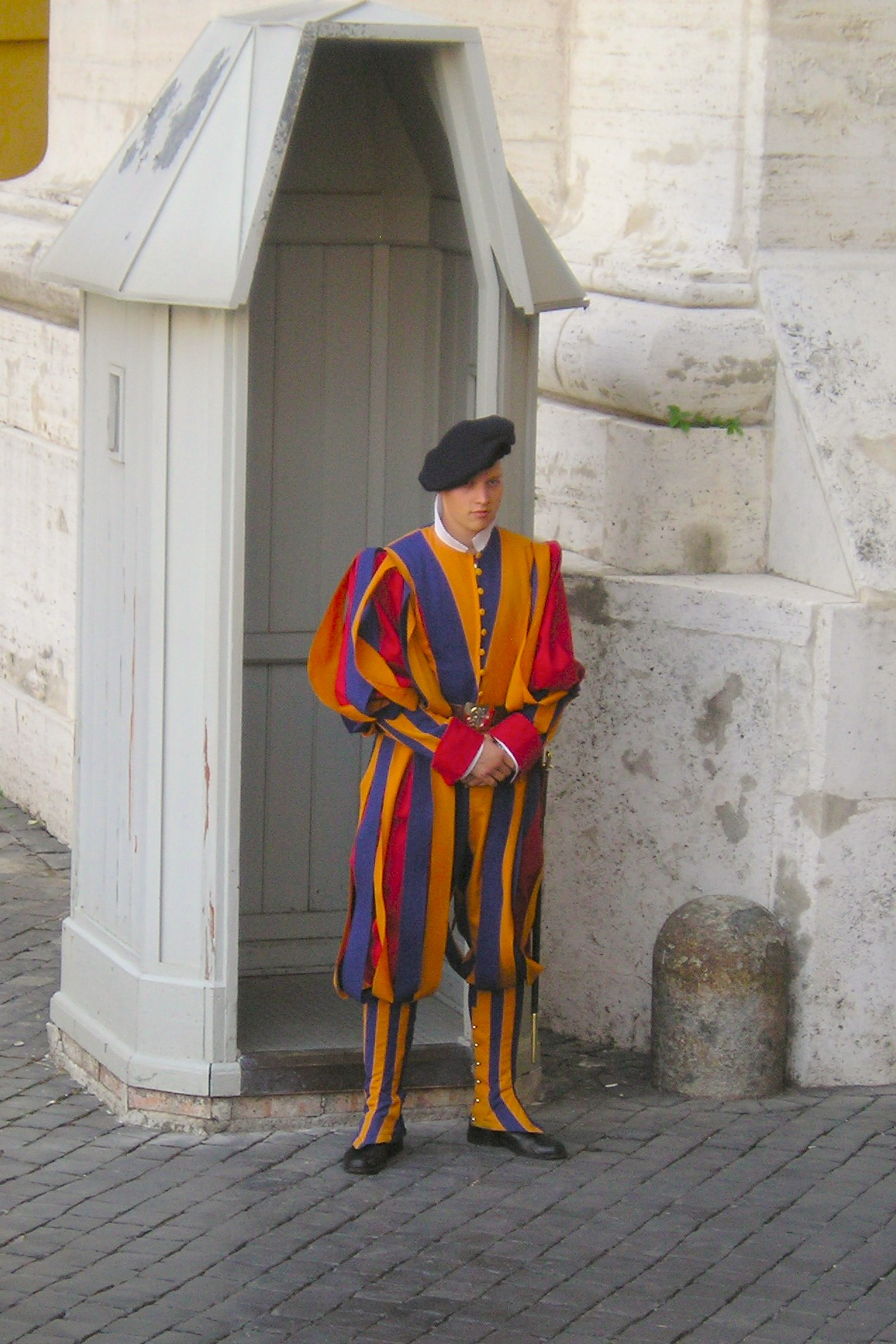
A Swiss Guard.

Military in Vatican City

- Command
  - Commander-in-chief: Christoph Graf
- Forces — Vatican City lies within Rome, the capital of Italy, and therefore defense is the responsibility of Italy.
  - Army of Vatican City: none, see Military in Vatican City; Army of Italy
  - Navy of Vatican City: none, see Navy of Italy
  - Air Force of Vatican City: none, see Aeronautica Militare
  - Special forces of Vatican City: none, see Special forces of Italy
- Military ranks in Vatican City

=== Local government in Vatican City ===
- Being a city-state, the government of Vatican City is also the local government.

== History of Vatican City ==
History of Vatican City

- History of the Papacy
  - Prisoner in the Vatican
- Governor of Vatican City
- Military history of Vatican City
  - History of the Swiss Guard
  - Sack of Rome (1527)

== Culture of Vatican City ==
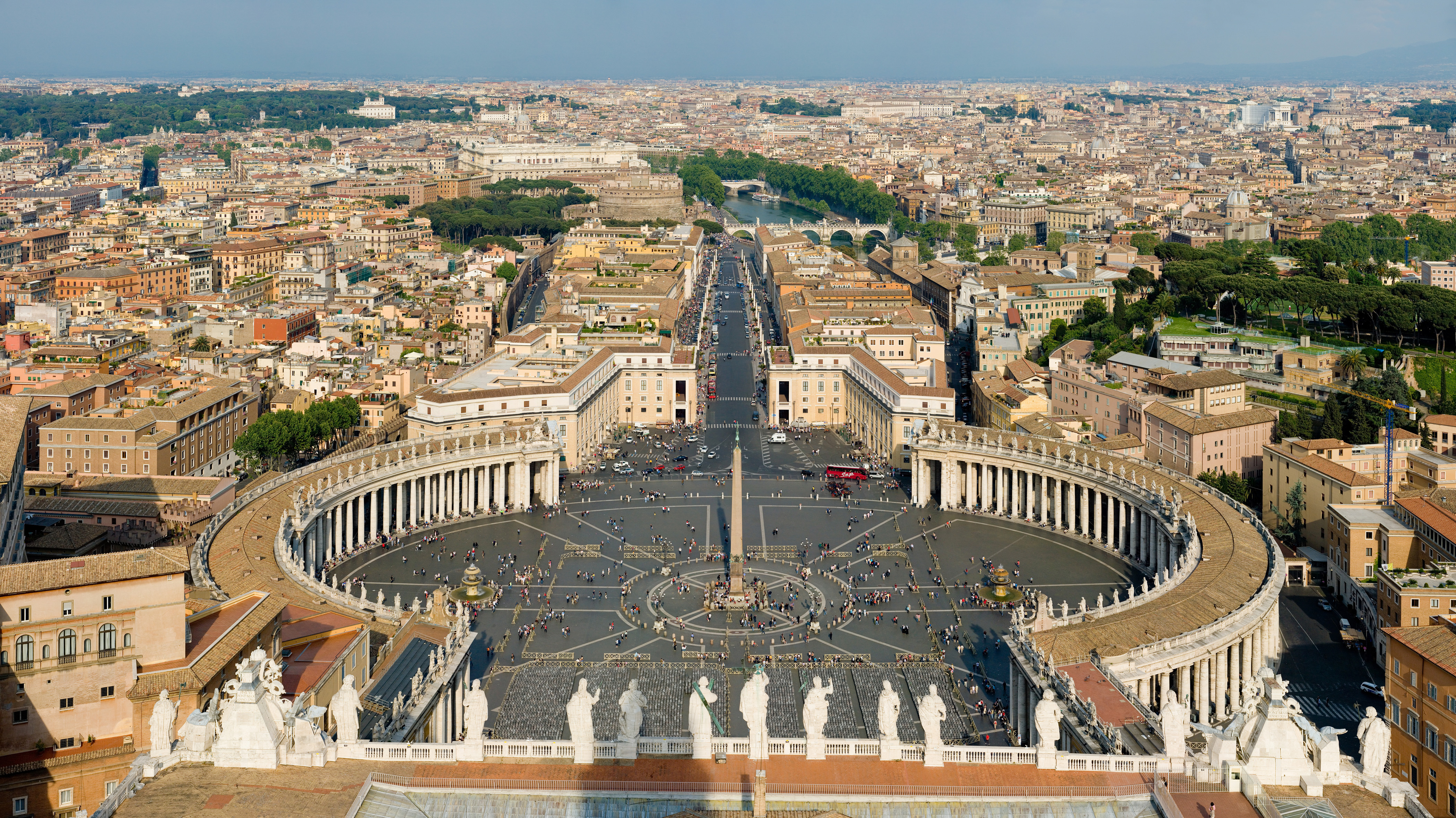
Saint Peter's Square and beyond it Rome, as viewed from the dome of Saint Peter's Basilica.

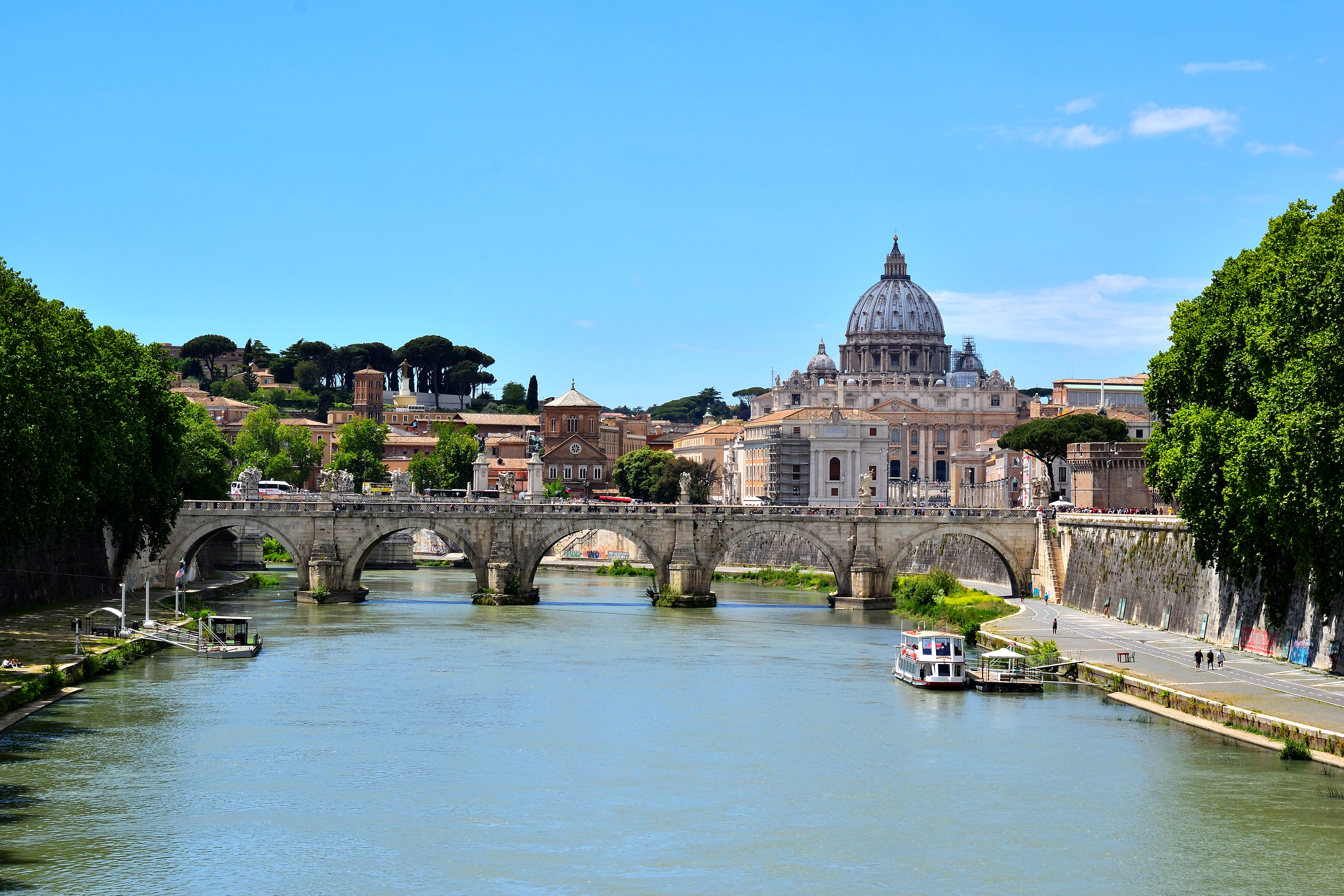
St. Peter's Basilica from the River Tiber. The iconic dome dominates the skyline of this part of Rome.

Culture of Vatican City

- Architecture of Vatican City
  - Saint Peter's Square
  - Churches in Vatican City:
    - St. Peter's Basilica
  - Palaces in Vatican City:
    - Apostolic Palace
    - Casina Pio IV
    - Domus Sanctae Marthae
    - Torre San Giovanni
- National symbols of Vatican City
  - Coat of arms of Vatican City
  - Flag of Vatican City
  - National anthem of Vatican City
- People of Vatican City
- Religion in Vatican City – Vatican City is the sovereign territory and headquarters of the Roman Catholic Church, and home of the Pope
  - Christianity
    - Catholicism
      - Roman Catholic Church
        - Pope
        - Vicar General for Vatican City
- World Heritage Sites in Vatican City: Vatican City is itself a World Heritage Site

=== Art in Vatican City ===
- Art in Vatican City
  - The Resurrection
  - Vatican Museums
    - Anima Mundi
    - Collection of Modern Religious Art
    - The Gallery of Maps
    - Raphael Rooms
    - Sistine Chapel
      - The Last Judgment
    - Sistine Chapel ceiling
- Literature of Vatican City
  - Vatican Library
  - Vatican Apostolic Archive
- Music of Vatican City
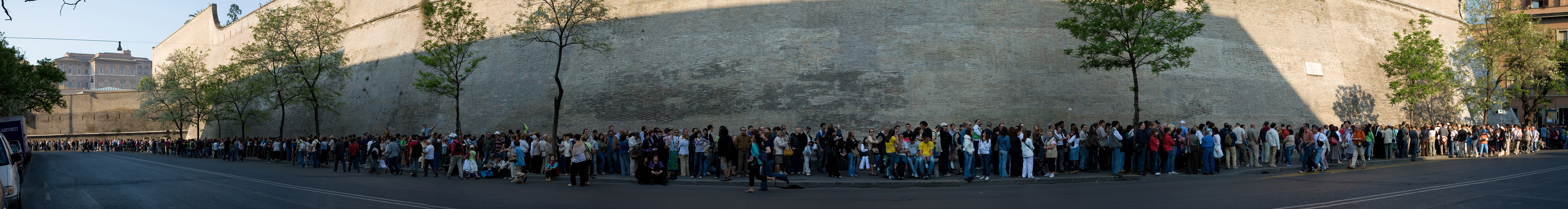
On the last Sunday of each month, the Vatican Museum is open to the public for free. This is extremely popular and it is common to wait in line for many hours. This image is a panoramic view of one small stretch of the entire queue in April 2007, which continues for some distance in both directions beyond view. In the background is the Vatican City's wall.

=== Sports in Vatican City ===
- Cricket in Vatican City
  - Vatican Cricket Team
- Football in Vatican City
  - Vatican City national football team
- Vatican City at the Olympics: has not competed

== Economy and infrastructure of Vatican City ==
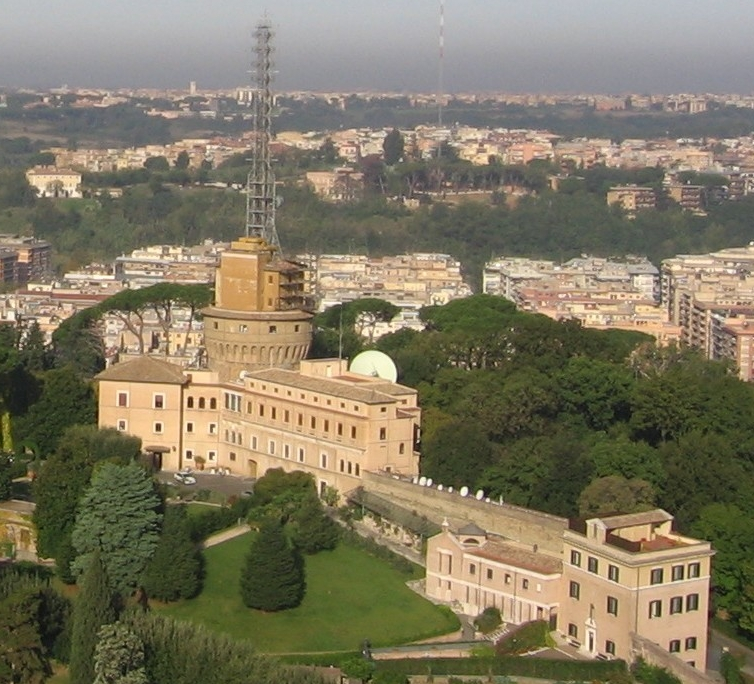
The Vatican Radio building.

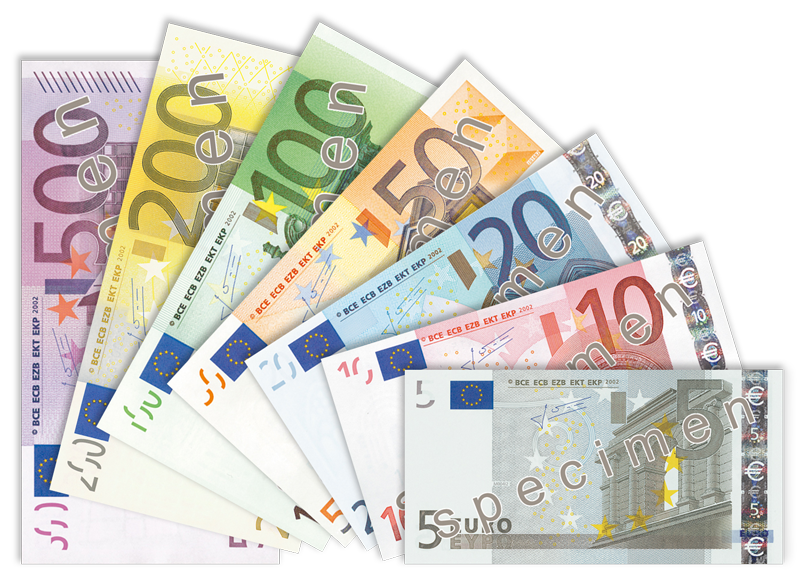
Euro banknotes.

Economy of Vatican City

- Economic rank, by nominal GDP (2007):
- Economy type: noncommercial (based on donations from church-goers)
  - Church tax
  - Peter's Pence
- Agriculture in Vatican City: None. See Vatican Gardens.
- Banking in Vatican City
  - Vatican Bank
- Communications in Vatican City
  - Internet in Vatican City
    - .va
  - Vatican Library
  - L'Osservatore Romano
  - Octava Dies
  - Vatican Radio
- Companies of Vatican City: none
- Currency of Vatican City: Euro (see also: Euro topics)
  - Former currency: Vatican lira
  - ISO 4217: EUR
- Health care in Vatican City
  - Vatican Pharmacy
- Mining in Vatican City: none
- Tourism in Vatican City
- Transportation in Vatican City
  - Airports in Vatican City: none. Rome is served by two airports which are used by travellers to the Vatican.
  - Rail transport in Vatican City
  - Roads in Vatican City (see map)
    - Being only 1.05 km long and 0.85 km wide, Vatican City has no highways.
    - Vatican City has access roads and driveways. (See map)

== Education in Vatican City ==
- Academies in Vatican City:
  - Pontifical Academy of Sciences
  - Pontifical Academy of Social Sciences
  - Pontifical Academy for Life
- Biblioteca Apostolica Vaticana (Vatican Library)
  - Includes the Vatican School of Librarianship
- Congregation for Catholic Education
- Vatican School of Palaeography, Diplomacy, and Archivistry, run by the Vatican Apostolic Archive.
- Vatican City is too small to host extensive educational facilities, but the Holy See operates 64 academic institutions close by (in Rome). The major ones are:
  - Pontifical University of St. Thomas Aquinas (Angelicum)
  - Pontifical Gregorian University
  - Pontifical Urbaniana University
  - Pontifical Lateran University
  - Pontifical University of the Holy Cross
  - Salesian Pontifical University
  - Pontifical University Antonianum

== See also ==
- Index of Vatican City-related articles
- List of international rankings
- Outline of Europe
- Outline of geography
- Roman Catholic Church
- Holy See
