= Vatican citizenship law =

Citizenship, Residence and Access Law Legge sulla cittadinanza, la residenza e l’accesso

Pontifical Commission
- Citation: Legge 22 febbraio 2011, n. CXXXI
- Territorial extent: Vatican City
- Enacted by: Pope Benedict XVI
- Enacted: 22 February 2011
- Commenced: 22 February 2011
- Status: In force

The primary law governing citizenship of Vatican City is the Citizenship, Residence and Access Law, which came into force on 22 February 2011.

Vatican citizenship is granted almost exclusively to persons who perform specific duties to the Holy See or state administration of Vatican City. Family members of Vatican citizens may be granted citizenship if they live within state boundaries. Any person who does not meet the statutory employment requirement nor is a family member of a Vatican citizen, but has been granted permission to reside in Vatican City by the Pope, may be granted citizenship on a discretionary basis.

== History ==
After the capture of Rome in 1870, the temporal power of the Holy See became restricted to the immediate area surrounding St. Peter's Basilica. The Kingdom of Italy acknowledged papal authority over the limited territory, enacting the Law of Guarantees in 1871 in an attempt to normalise relations, but this was never accepted by the Holy See. The 1929 Lateran Treaty formally established the Vatican City State, a fully independent and sovereign state governed by the Holy See that is pledged to be permanently neutral in international affairs.

== Acquisition and loss of citizenship ==
Unlike regulations governing nationality of other countries, Vatican citizenship is acquired primarily after being appointed to an office associated with the Holy See. Citizenship must be obtained by application and cannot be acquired automatically by virtue of holding a qualifying position. This includes officials of the Catholic Church domiciled within the Vatican or in Rome, diplomats of the Holy See, and any other person who is resident in Vatican City because of their occupation. Spouses and children of a Vatican citizen who are authorised to reside in state territory may apply for a grant of citizenship. Any person who holds permission from the Pope to reside within the Vatican, but who does not otherwise meet requirements for employment or family relations, is nevertheless eligible to apply for citizenship. In 2024, there were 673 citizens of Vatican City.

All grants of Vatican citizenship are temporary in nature with the exception of the status of the Pope, who holds Vatican citizenship for life. Any person who ceases employment in a qualifying office or is no longer domiciled in Vatican City automatically loses Vatican citizenship. Family members of a person whose qualifying employment ends also lose their Vatican citizenship at the same time. Upon reaching age 18, children of a Vatican citizen automatically cease to hold Vatican citizenship and must apply for continued residence permission at that time if desired. Cardinals who become domiciled outside of Vatican City or Rome also lose Vatican citizenship. Any person who loses Vatican citizenship and would otherwise become stateless automatically acquires Italian nationality.

== See also ==
- Visa policy of Vatican City
- Visa requirements for Vatican citizens
