= Visa policy of Vatican City =

Policy on permits required to enter Vatican City

Visa policy of Vatican City

Although not a member of either the European Union or the European Economic Area, the Vatican City maintains an open border with Italy and is treated as part of the Schengen Area. Since the Vatican City is only accessible via Italy, entering the Vatican City is not possible without entering the Schengen Area first; hence Schengen visa rules apply de facto. The residence of non-citizens requires an authorisation.

== Bilateral agreements ==
Vatican City signs independent visa-free agreements which are of symbolic value for foreign citizens but do have effect on Vatican passport holders.

== See also ==
- Visa requirements for Vatican citizens
- Visa policy of the Schengen Area
- Tourism in Vatican City
- Foreign relations of the Holy See
- List of diplomatic missions of the Holy See
