= Papal arms =

Papal arms may refer to:

- Coat of arms of the Holy See (the coat of arms of the papacy)
- Papal coats of arms (personal coats of arms of individual popes)
