= Freedom of religion in Italy =

Freedom of religion in Italy is guaranteed under the 1947 constitution of the Italian Republic. Before that religious toleration was provided for by the constitution of the Kingdom of Italy which in turn derived from the Albertine Statute granted by Carlo Alberto of the Kingdom of Sardinia to his subjects in 1848, the Year of Revolutions.

== History ==
Article 1 of the Albertine Statute identified Catholicism as the single religion of state but declared that other existing confessions were tolerated in conformance with the laws. This declaration led rapidly to the opening of the ghettoes and the emancipation of the Waldensians. Toleration was limited however: Article 28, while declaring that there should be a free press, stated specifically that Bibles, catechisms, liturgies and prayer books could not be printed without episcopal permission; religious propaganda was also prohibited by the state. Nevertheless, in the years leading up to the unification of Italy the Kingdom of Sardinia was more tolerant than other states on the peninsula: in the Grand Duchy of Tuscany the practice of religions other than Catholicism was punishable by imprisonment or exile.

The Kingdom of Italy inherited in effect the Piedmontese-Sardinian constitution and on 18 March 1871 a major advance in religious freedom in the country was made by an order of the day introduced by the liberal reformist Pasquale Stanislao Mancini which established that all religions should be treated equally.

The Fascist period was marked by the Concordat between the state and the Catholic Church, known as the Lateran Treaty of 1929. Other Christian denominations and other religions, however, faced renewed repression. In 1935 the Pentecostals were declared prejudicial to the integrity of the race. Salvationists and Jehovah's Witnesses, as well as the Pentecostals were liable to imprisonment or exile while other minority Christian groups faced notable restrictions. Although antisemitism was not embedded in Italian Fascism from the start, in order to please his ally Adolf Hitler, in the late 1930s Benito Mussolini approved the Italian Racial Laws. In the latter stages of World War II, in particular during the period of the Italian Social Republic and of German occupation of much of the peninsula, many Jews, as well as non-Jew political dissidents and even Catholic priests, were deported to the Nazi death camps.

The 1947 Constitution of the Italian Republic enshrined religious freedoms in passages including the following:

All citizens have equal social dignity and are equal before the law, without distinction of […], religion [….] (Article 3)

All religious confessions are equally free before the law. (Article 8)

All have the right to profess freely their own religious faith in whatever form […], provided that the rites are not contrary to morality. (Article 19)

Various laws enacted during the Fascist period remained in force, however, and a number of trials took place involving Pentecostals and Jehovah's Witnesses. This changed in 1955 with the advent of the Constitutional Court which abolished or modified legislation on relevant matters which it found inconsistent with the constitutional guarantees of religious freedom.

In 1984, following a revised accord with the Vatican, Catholicism lost its status as the official religion of the Italian state and Italy became a secular state.

Controversy however remains, particularly abroad, over certain Fascist-era laws about crucifixes that are still in force and that have not been declared unconstitutional. In 2009 the European Court of Human Rights, in a case brought by an Italian mother who wanted her children to have a secular education, ruled against the display of crucifixes in the classrooms of Italian state schools. It found that 'The compulsory display of a symbol of a given confession in premises used by the public authorities… restricted the right of parents to educate their children in conformity with their convictions' and that it restricted the 'right of children to believe or not to believe'. This ruling was in marked contrast with the position of the Italian courts that had ruled in 2005 that crucifixes were allowed to be present in polling stations and, in 2006, that display of crucifixes in state schools was allowed on the basis that the crucifix symbolised core Italian social values.

== Demographics ==
A 2021 study by the independent Center for Studies of New Religions (CESNUR) estimated that 74.5% of the population were Catholic, 15.3% atheist or agnostic, 4.1% non-Catholic Christian, 3.7% Muslim, and 2.2% followers of other religions (including Jews, Hindus, Baha’is, Buddhists, Sikhs, the International Society for Krishna Consciousness and Ananda Marga Pracaraka Samgha).

== Freedom of religion in Italy today ==
Italy is a predominantly Catholic country, with minorities of Muslims (mostly from recent immigration), Sikhs and Jews. Christian Protestants are historically few. A few Protestants, such as two-time Prime Minister Sidney Sonnino, have distinguished themselves.

The Catholic Church was the state church until it was de facto disestablished with the 1948 Constitution, then definitely with the 1984 revision of the Lateran Treaty. Now Italy is a secular state.

Italy guarantees full freedom of religion, but the Catholic Church holds influence on several political parties. The fact that the Catholic Church has influence on political parties is object of debate among those who favour the independence of politics and in particular among those whose views on divorce, abortion, euthanasia and same-sex marriages are opposed to Christian ethics and in particular to Catholic doctrine.

Usage of Catholic symbolism (especially crosses) in courts and schools has been contested by minorities, but was ruled legal; some contend that this is in violation of the principles of religious freedom outlined in the Constitution of Italy.

Apart from political and ethical aspects, since the Lateran Treaty, Italy provides public funding of the Catholic Church, that do not include only the otto per mille tax.

In 2023, the country was scored 4 out of 4 for religious freedom.

== See also ==
- Eight per thousand - the law through which Italian taxpayers allocate 0.8% ('eight per thousand') of their income taxes to legally recognised religions or to the State.
- Religion in Italy
- Public funding of the Catholic Church in Italy
