= Tourism in Vatican City =

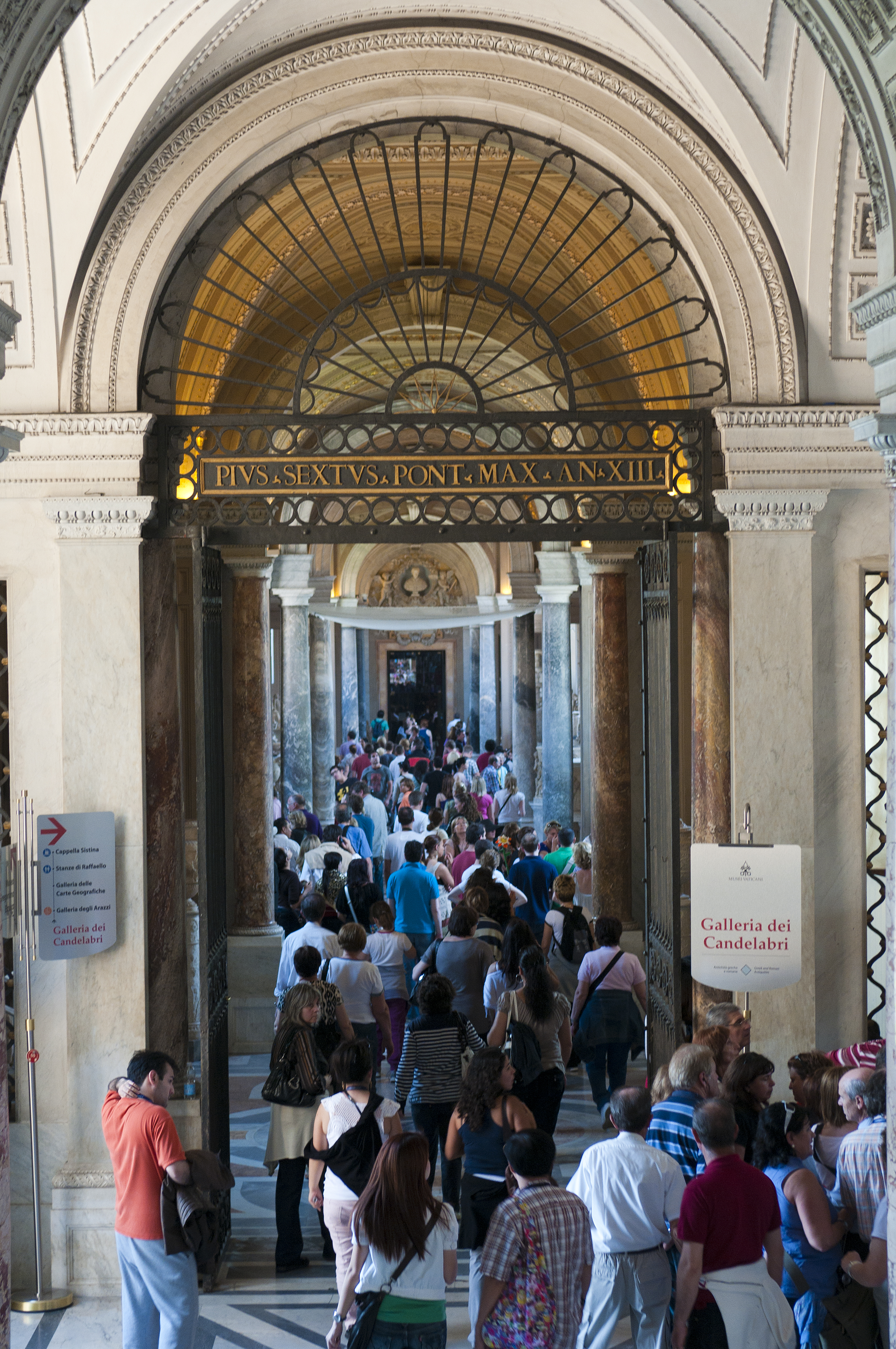
Tourists in the Vatican Museums

The main Tourism in Vatican City are focused in religious tourism and city tourism, including the visit to the Basilica of St. Peter, Saint Peter's Square, the Vatican Museums, the Sistine Chapel, and the Raphael Rooms. Vatican City is quarter of a square mile (0.44 km^{2}) in area, is a popular destination for tourists, especially Catholics wishing to see the Pope or to celebrate their faith. The largest numbers of pilgrims visit Vatican City at special moments in the liturgical year, such as Christmas or Easter, or during important periods such as the proclamation of a holy year or the funeral and election of a pope.

Tourism is one of the principal sources of revenue in the economy of Vatican City. In 2007 about 4.3 million tourists visited the Vatican Museums alone. Tourism is the main cause of the Vatican's unusually high crime rate: tourists are blamed for various minor thefts and incidents.

== Vatican City ==
The Vatican was built during the year 326 A.D. As the population and housing grew, the first palace was built during the 5th century under the reign of Pope Symmachus (498–514). Under the Holy Roman Empire, the Papal States grew to include a large portion of central Italy. But since the unification of Italy in the mid-19th century, Vatican City is the only papal state that has survived. As of 1929, because of the Lateran Treaty, the Vatican is recognized as its own independent state, the smallest in the world in population and land size, with a population of just over 800 people in July 2011. The Pope is not only the head of the Catholic religion but also head of state for Vatican City. Since the Vatican is located in Italy, the main language of the Vatican state (or Vatican City) is Italian.

== Tourist Attractions ==
Tourists are able to visit the Vatican's museums for a fee of about 15 to 19 euros. The number of people who come to see the Vatican's Museum has surpassed five million per year as of 2011. The Vatican's exotic gardens are also an attraction. From the gardens, wonderful views can be seen of St. Peter's Basilica and the Apostolic Palace.

=== Sistine Chapel ===
The Sistine Chapel is home to many pieces of art including statues, tapestries, and paintings by Michelangelo Buonarroti. One of the most famous attractions is the ceiling painting of Creation of Adam, along with the rest of the ceiling done by Michelangelo between the years of 1508 and 1512, as well as The Last Judgment behind the altar, which he completed between 1536 and 1541.

No picture taking is allowed inside of the Sistine Chapel, but online the Vatican offers a 3D model of the inside of the Chapel. During the summer, approximately 20,000 people go through the Sistine Chapel per day, but limitations are being contemplated since some do not abide the rules of silence and no picture taking inside the chapel.

During a conclave for the election of a pope, the Chapel uses jamming devices inside of the Sistine Chapel to attempt to prevent people from spreading pictures or other forms of information inside of the Chapel via mobile devices. This also prevents information from being leaked about the cardinals' decision as to who the new pope will be.

== See also ==
- Index of Vatican City-related articles
- Outline of Vatican City
- Theatre state
