= .va =

Internet country code top-level domain for Vatican City

- Introduced: 11 September 1995 (root zone)
- TLD type: Country code top-level domain
- Status: Active
- Registry: Vatican Internet Service
- Sponsor: Holy See Secretariat of State
- Intended use: Entities connected with Vatican City
- Registration restrictions: No public registrations are available
- Dispute policies: None
- Registry website: comunicazione.va

.va is the Internet country code top-level domain (ccTLD) for the Vatican City State. It is administered by the Vatican Internet Service, and used exclusively by official institutions of the Vatican. Public registration of .va domains is not available.

== Background ==
The .va top-level domain was created in 1995 by Archbishop John Patrick Foley of the Pontifical Council for Social Communications. The website vatican.va went live on Christmas Day 1995.

The Vatican Internet Service was tasked with running the operations related to the .va domain, as well as all other Internet-related activities. Since 2016, the Service has been part of the Dicastery for Communication.

== Websites ==
There are 86 domain names starting with "www" in the .va zone, with many more email-only subdomains.

== See also ==
- Index of Vatican City-related articles
