= Geography of Vatican City =

Map of Vatican City

Vatican City is unique due to the country's position as an urban, landlocked enclave of Rome, Italy. With an area of 49 hectares (120 acres; 0.49 square kilometres), (Note: The De Agostini Atlas Calendar listed the area of Vatican City as 0.44 km^{2} in its 1930 edition but corrected it to 0.49 km^{2} in its 1945–46 edition. The figure of 0.44 km^{2} is still widely cited by many sources despite its inaccuracy.) and a border with Italy of 3.5 km (2.2 mi), it is the world's smallest independent state. Outside the Vatican City, thirteen buildings in Rome and Castel Gandolfo (the pope's summer residence) enjoy extraterritorial rights (one building, the Paul VI Audience Hall, straddles the border, but its Italian portion has extraterritorial rights). The country contains no major natural resources, and no known natural hazards other than those that affect Rome in general, such as earthquakes.

== Climate ==
The city state has the same climate as Rome: temperate, mild, rainy winters (September to mid-May) with hot, dry summers (May to September).

== Terrain ==
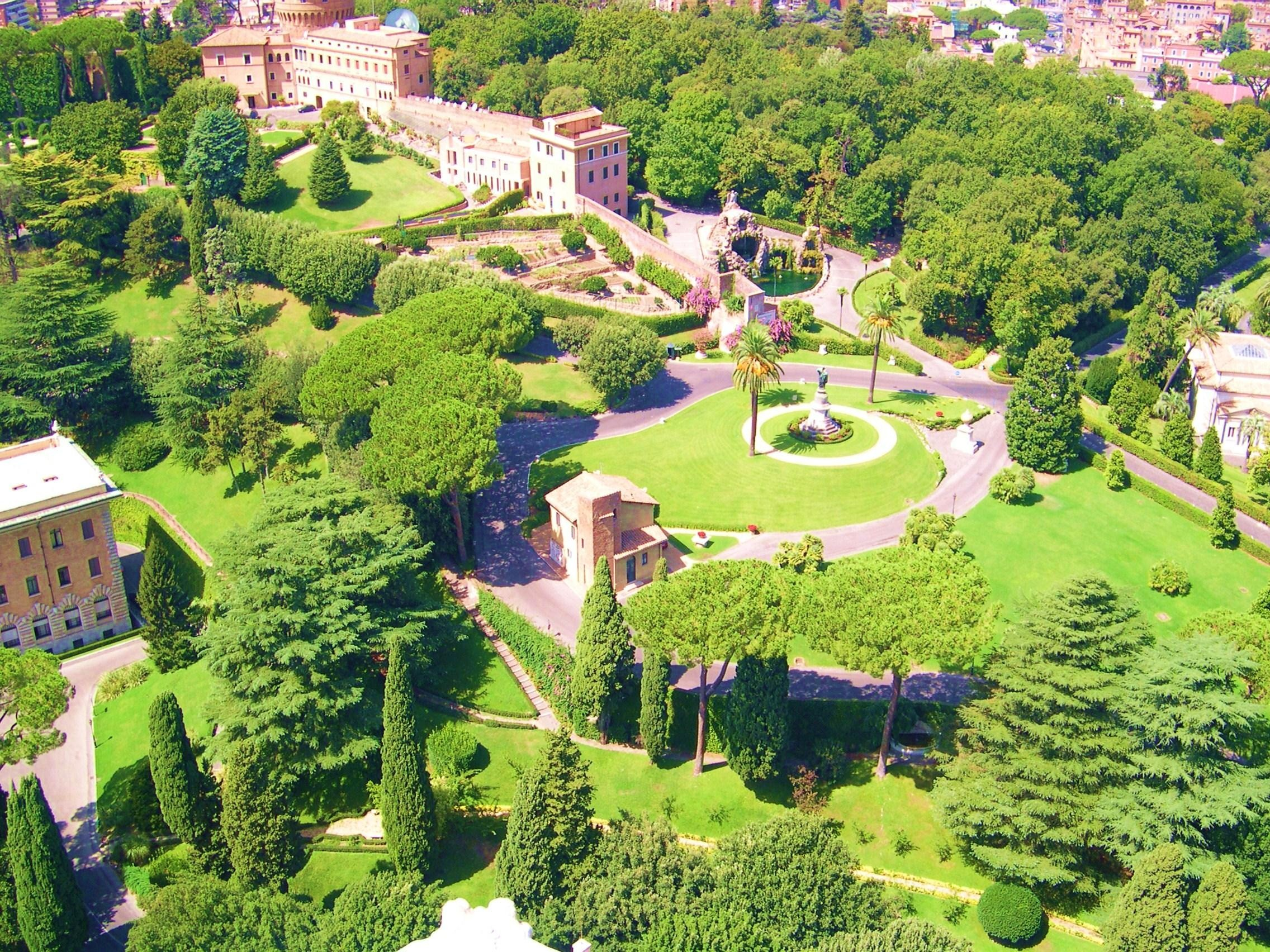
A view of the Gardens of Vatican City

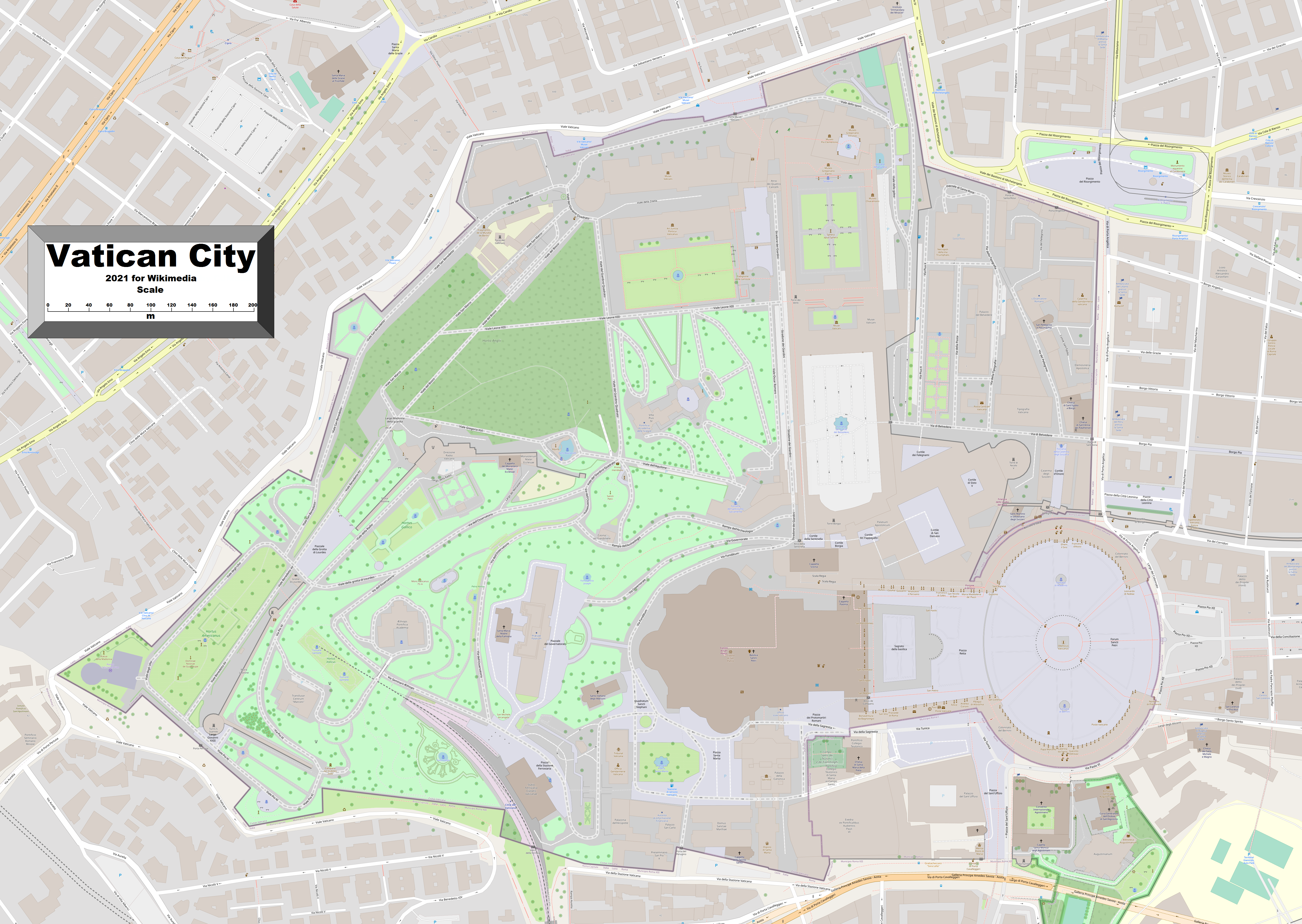
Enlargeable, detailed map of Vatican City

Vatican City sits on a low hill. The hill has been called the Vatican Hill (in Latin, Mons Vaticanus) since long before Christianity existed. An Etruscan settlement, possibly called Vatica or Vaticum, may have existed in the area generally known by the ancient Romans as "Vatican territory" (vaticanus ager), but if so, no archaeological trace of it has been discovered.

=== Extreme points ===
This is a list of the extreme points of Vatican City: the points that are farther north, south, east or west than any other location, as well as the highest and lowest points.

- North: at the intersection of the Viale Vaticano and the Via Leone IV (41°54′26.74″N 12°27′19.46″E)
- South: at the intersection of the Via della Stazione Vaticana and the Via di Porta Cavalleggeri (41°54′00.78″N 12°27′16.14″E)
- West: at the intersection of the Viale Vaticano and the Via Aurelia (41°54′07.08″N 12°26′44.62″E)
- East: at the easternmost edge of Saint Peter's Square (41°54′08.16″N 12°27′30.01″E)

The lowest point in Vatican City is an unnamed location at 19 metres (62 ft). The highest point is another unnamed location at 76 metres (249 ft). The tallest building is St. Peter's Basilica, at 138 metres (453 feet).

== Land use ==
The nature of the estate is fundamentally urban and none of the land is reserved for significant agriculture or other exploitation of natural resources. The city state displays an impressive degree of land economy, born of necessity due to its extremely limited territory. Thus, the urban development (i.e., buildings) is optimized to occupy about half of the total area, while the rest is reserved for open space, including the Vatican Gardens. The territory holds many diverse structures that help provide autonomy for the sovereign state, including a rail line and train station, heliport, post office, radio station (with extraterritorial antennas in Italy), military barracks, government palaces and offices, public plaza, part of an audience hall, old defensive wall marking the border, institutions of higher learning, and cultural/art centers.

== Environment ==
In July 2007, the Vatican accepted an offer that would make it the only carbon-neutral state for the year, due to the donation of the Vatican Climate Forest in Hungary. The forest was to be sized to offset the year's carbon dioxide emissions. No trees have been planted under the project and the carbon offsets have not materialized.

=== International agreements ===
- Party to: Ozone Layer Protection
- Signed, but not ratified: Air Pollution, Environmental Modification

== See also ==
- Geography of Italy
- Properties of the Holy See
- Index of Vatican City-related articles
