= Economy of Vatican City =

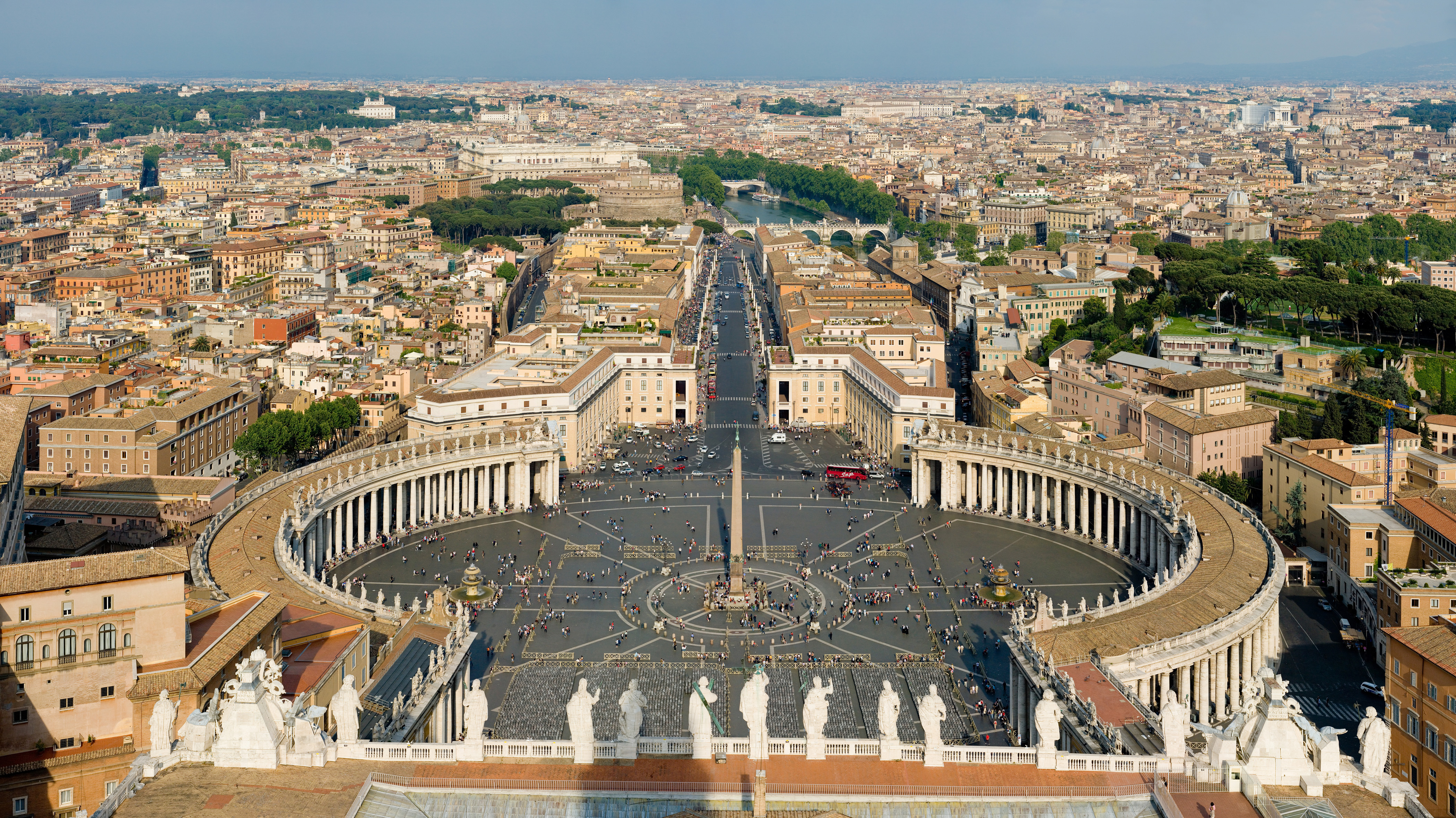
- View of St. Peter's Square from the top of St. Peter's Basilica
- Currency: Euro (EUR)
- Fiscal year: Calendar year

Statistics
- GDP: 19.80 M
- GDP growth: 0%
- GDP per capita: US$30,461
- Inflation (CPI): 6.9%
- Population below national poverty line: 0%
- Gini coefficient: 35.16
- Labour force: 4,822 (2016)
- Labour force by occupation: note: essentially services with a small amount of industry; nearly all dignitaries, priests, nuns, guards, and the approximately 3,000 lay workers live outside Vatican City
- Main industries: printing, production of coins, medals, postage stamps, mosaics and staff uniforms and financial services

Public finance
- Revenue: €770 million (2021)
- Spending: €803 million (2021)
- All values, unless otherwise stated, are in US dollars.

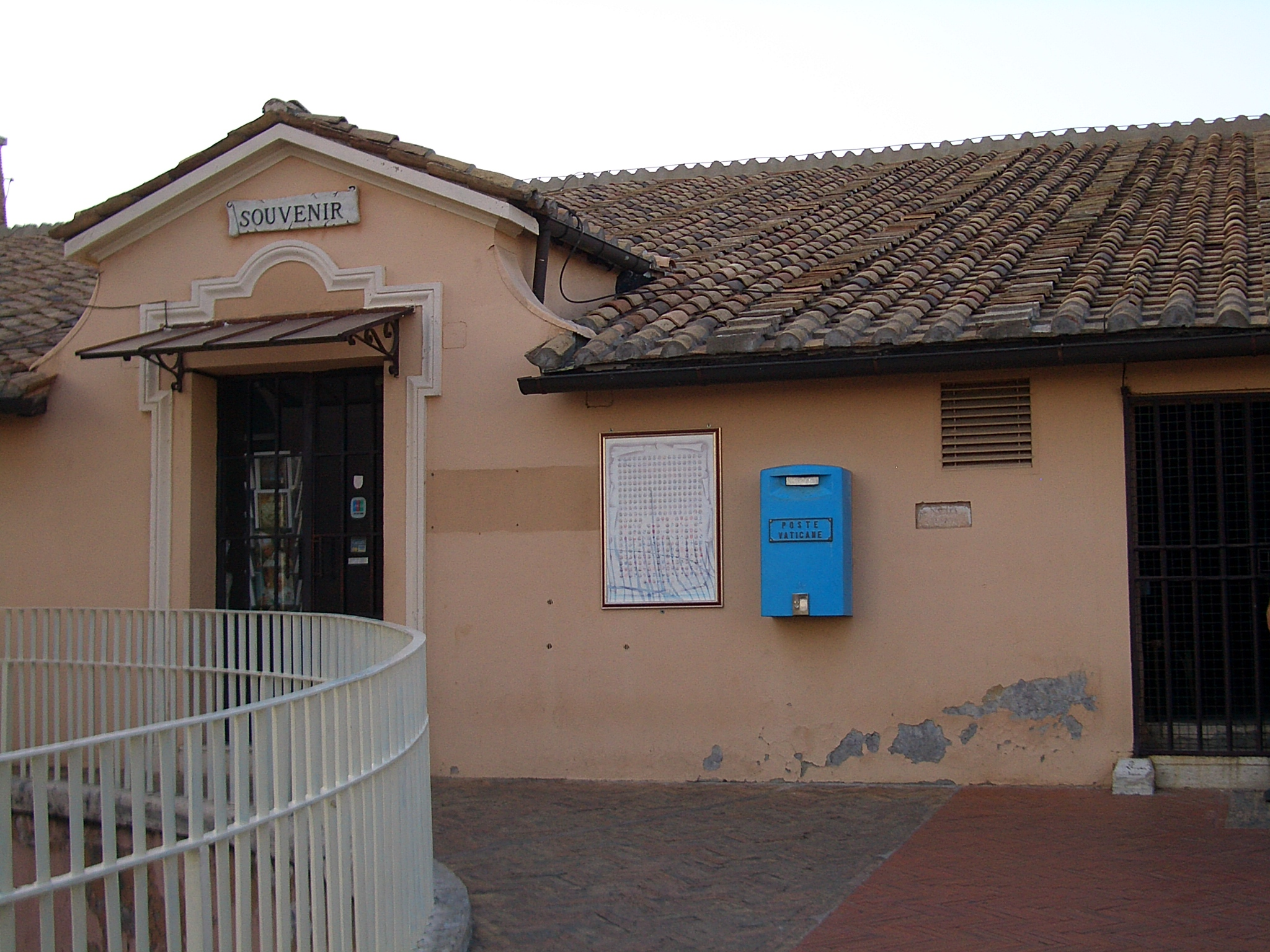
A souvenir shop on the roof of St. Peter's Basilica

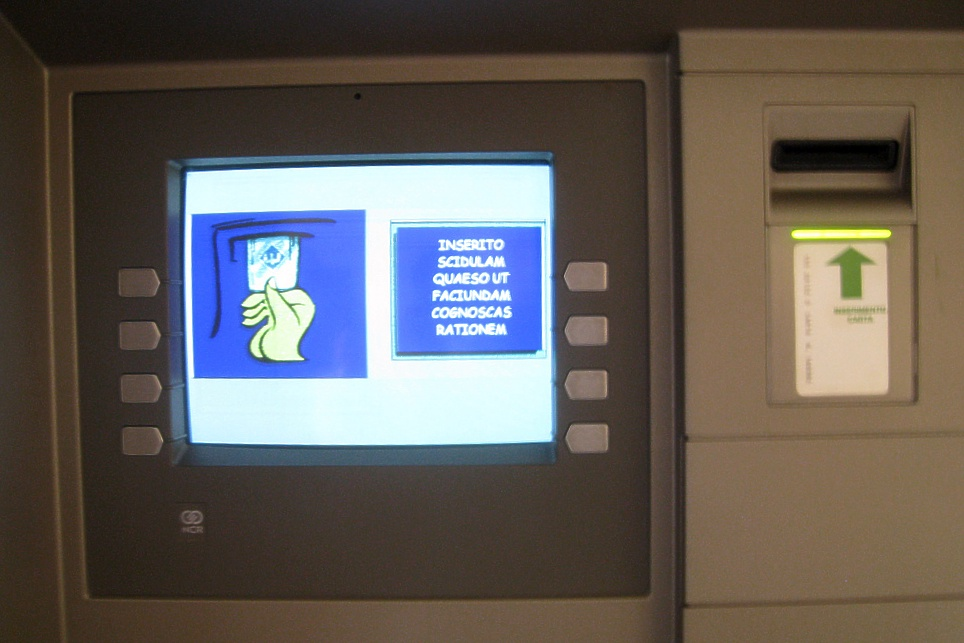
An ATM in Vatican City with Latin instructions

The economy of Vatican City is mainly supported financially by the sale of stamps, coins, medals, and tourist mementos as well as fees for admission to museums and publication sales. Vatican City employed 4,822 people in 2016.

The Vatican City receives subsidies from the Italian state, which include the water supply free of charge, tax exemptions and other kinds of dedicated public funding.

Vatican City issues its own coins and stamps. It has used the euro as its currency since 1 January 1999, owing to a special agreement with the European Union (council decision 1999/98). Euro coins and notes were introduced on 1 January 2002—the Vatican does not issue euro banknotes. Issuance of euro-denominated coins is strictly limited by treaty, though somewhat more than usual is allowed in a year in which there is a change in the papacy. Because of their rarity, Vatican euro coins are highly sought by collectors.

1€-Vatican_Franciscus-Revers

Vatican euro coins with images of Pope Francis and Pope Benedict XVI

== Key statistics ==
Budget

- Revenues: €770 million (2021)
- Expenditures: €803 million (2021)
- Deficit: €33m (2021)

Industries – Printing and production of a small amount of mosaics and staff uniforms; worldwide banking and financial activities.

Electricity – production – 442 MWh (2010) from solar panels.

Electricity – imports – Electricity supplied by Italy.

Currency – Euro (since 2002). Vatican City depends on Italy for practical production of banknotes, stamps and other valuable titles. Owing to their rarity, Vatican euro coins are sought by collectors.

== See also ==
- Secretariat for the Economy
- Index of Vatican City-related articles
- Philatelic and Numismatic Office of the Vatican City State
- Vatican euro coins
