= Visa requirements for Vatican citizens =

Administrative entry restrictions

Visa requirements for Vatican citizens are administrative entry restrictions by the authorities of other states placed on citizens of Vatican City. As of 2026, Vatican citizens have visa-free or visa on arrival access to 151 countries and territories, ranking the Vatican passport 23rd in terms of travel freedom according to the Henley Passport Index.

== Visa requirements map ==
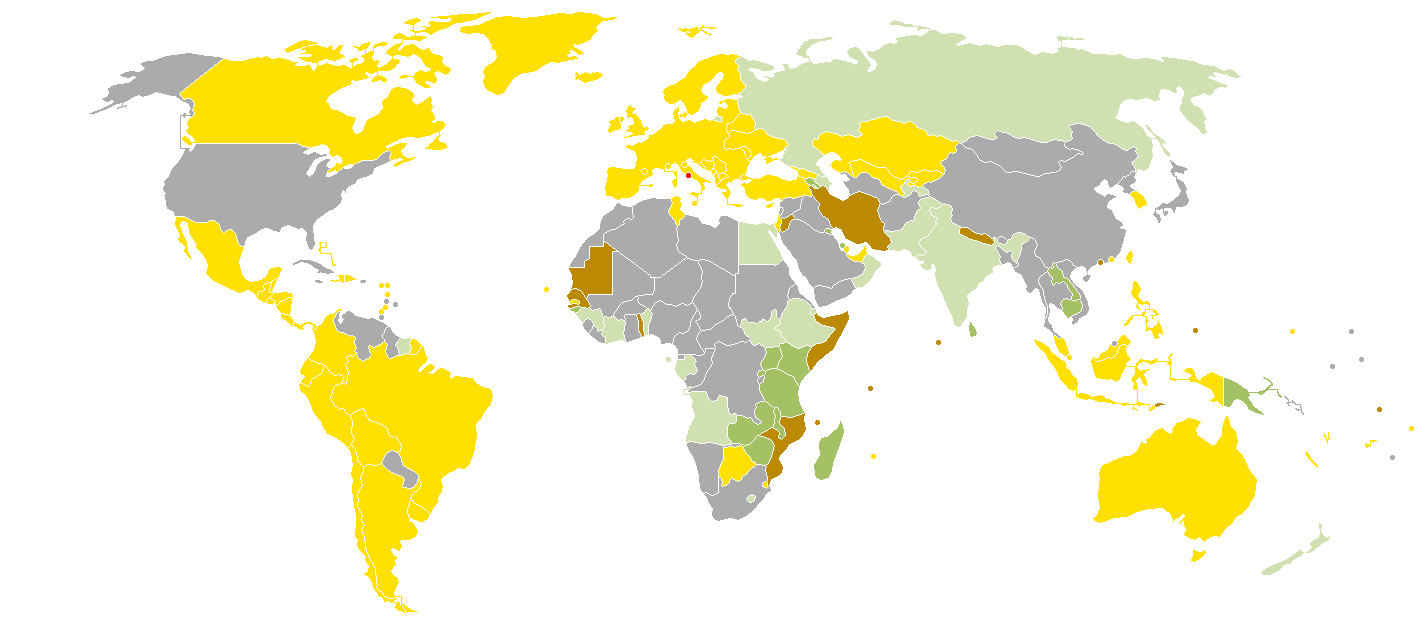
Visa requirements for Vatican citizens Vatican City Visa not required / eTA Visa on arrival eVisa Visa available online or on arrival Visa required in advance

== Visa requirements ==
Country	Visa requirement	Allowed stay	Notes (excluding departure fees)
Afghanistan	eVisa	30 days	Visa is not required in case born in Afghanistan or can prove that one of their parents is a national of Afghanistan or born in Afghanistan.; e-Visa : Visitors must arrive at Kabul International (KBL).
Albania	Visa not required	90 days	
Algeria	Visa required		
Andorra	Visa not required		
Angola	eVisa	30 days	30 days per trip, but no more than 90 days within any 1 calendar year for tourism purposes only.; Visitors must have a return/onward ticket and a hotel reservation confirmation.; An International Certificate of Vaccination is required.
Antigua and Barbuda	Visa not required	6 months	
Argentina	Visa not required	90 days	
Armenia	eVisa / Visa on arrival	120 days	
Australia	eVisitor	90 days	90 days on each visit in 12-month period if granted
Austria	Visa not required	90 days	90 days within any 180 day period in the Schengen Area
Azerbaijan	eVisa	30 days	
Bahamas	Visa not required	8 months	
Bahrain	eVisa/Visa on arrival	14 days	
Bangladesh	Visa on arrival	30 days	
Barbados	Visa required		
Belarus	Visa not required	30 days	Visa-free until 31 December 2024.
Belgium	Visa not required	90 days	90 days within any 180 day period in the Schengen Area
Belize	Visa not required		
Benin	eVisa	30 days	Must have an international vaccination certificate.
Bhutan	eVisa		Visa fee is USD 40 per person and visa application may be processed within 5 business days with duration of stay of 90 days.; e-Visa applicant is also subject to pay Sustainable Development Fee
Bolivia	Visa not required	3 months	
Bosnia and Herzegovina	Visa not required	90 days	90 days within any 6-month period
Botswana	Visa not required	90 days	
Brazil	Visa not required	90 days	
Brunei	Visa required		
Bulgaria	Visa not required	90 days	90 days within any 180 day period in the Schengen Area
Burkina Faso	eVisa		
Burundi	eVisa/Visa on arrival		
Cambodia	eVisa / Visa on arrival	30 days	Visa is also obtainable online.
Cameroon	eVisa		
Canada	Visa not required	6 months	eTA required if arriving by air.
Cape Verde	Visa not required	30 days	
Central African Republic	Visa required		
Chad	Visa required		
Chile	Visa not required	90 days	
China	Visa required		Visa on arrival for Macau
Colombia	Visa not required	180 days	90 days - extendable up to 180-days stay within a one-year period
Comoros	Visa on arrival	45 days	
Republic of the Congo	Visa required		
Democratic Republic of the Congo	eVisa	7 days	
Costa Rica	Visa not required	90 days	
Côte d'Ivoire	eVisa	3 months	eVisa holders must arrive via Port Bouet Airport.
Croatia	Visa not required	90 days	90 days within any 180 day period in the Schengen Area
Cuba	eVisa/Tourist Card required	90 days	
Cyprus	Visa not required	90 days	90 days within any 180 day period
Czech Republic	Visa not required	90 days	90 days within any 180 day period in the Schengen Area
Denmark	Visa not required	90 days	90 days within any 180 day period in the Schengen Area
Djibouti	eVisa	31 days	
Dominica	Visa not required	21 days	
Dominican Republic	Visa not required	90 days	
Ecuador	Visa not required	90 days	
Egypt	eVisa/Visa on arrival	30 days	
El Salvador	Visa not required	3 months	
Equatorial Guinea	eVisa		
Eritrea	Visa required		
Estonia	Visa not required	90 days	90 days within any 180 day period in the Schengen Area
Eswatini	Visa not required	30 days	
Ethiopia	eVisa	up to 90 days	eVisa holders must arrive via Addis Ababa Bole International Airport
Fiji	Visa not required	120 days	
Finland	Visa not required	90 days	90 days within any 180 day period in the Schengen Area
France	Visa not required	90 days	90 days within any 180 day period in the Schengen Area
Gabon	eVisa	90 days	eVisa holders must arrive via Libreville International Airport.
Gambia	Visa not required	90 days	
Georgia	Visa not required	365 days / 1 year	
Germany	Visa not required	90 days	90 days within any 180 day period in the Schengen Area
Ghana	Visa required		
Greece	Visa not required	90 days	90 days within any 180 day period in the Schengen Area
Grenada	Visa not required	3 months	
Guatemala	Visa not required	90 days	
Guinea	eVisa	90 days	
Guinea-Bissau	eVisa / Visa on arrival	90 days	
Guyana	Visa required		
Haiti	Visa not required	90 days	
Honduras	Visa not required	3 months	
Hungary	Visa not required	90 days	90 days within any 180 day period in the Schengen Area
Iceland	Visa not required	90 days	90 days within any 180 day period in the Schengen Area
India	e-Visa	60 days	e-Visa holders must arrive via 32 designated airports (Note: Ahmedabad; Amritsar; Bagdogra; Bengaluru; Bhubaneswar; Chandigarh; Chennai; Coimbatore; Delhi; Gaya; Goa-Dabolim; Goa-Manohar; Guwahati; Hyderabad; Indore; Jaipur; Kannur; Kochi; Kolkata; Kozhikode; Lucknow; Madurai; Mangaluru; Mumbai; Nagpur; Port Blair; Pune; Surat; Thiruvananthapuram; Tiruchirappalli; Varanasi; Visakhapatnam) or 5 designated seaports. (Note: Chennai; Cochin; Mormugao (Goa); Mumbai; Mangalore); An Indian e-Tourist Visa may only be obtained twice within 1 calendar year.; Foreigners of Pakistani origin or who hold a Pakistani Passport are not eligible for an e-Visa. Foreigners who are not Pakistani nationals, but whose parents or grandparents (either paternal or maternal) were born in, or were permanent residents in Pakistan, are also not eligible for an e-Visa.
Indonesia	e-VOA/Visa on arrival	30 days	Select ports of entry.
Iran	eVisa/Visa on arrival	30 days	
Iraq	eVisa		
Ireland	Visa not required	90 days	
Israel	Electronic Travel Authorisation	3 months	
Italy	Visa not required	90 days	90 days within any 180 day period in the Schengen Area
Jamaica	Visa required		
Japan	Visa required		Holders of diplomatic and official passports do not need a visa for Japan, and are granted the status of residence as diplomats or officials
Jordan	eVisa/Visa on arrival		
Kazakhstan	Visa not required	30 days	
Kenya	Electronic Travel Authorisation	3 months	
Kiribati	Visa required		
North Korea	Visa required		
South Korea	Electronic Travel Authorisation	30 days	
Kuwait	eVisa / Visa on arrival	3 months	
Kyrgyzstan	Visa not required	60 days	
Laos	eVisa / Visa on arrival	30 days	18 (Note: Savannakhet Airport; Lanetoui - Mengkang (China); Meuangmom - Wan Pong (Myanmar); Banvang - Ban Khok Phai (Thailand); Namngeun - Huay Kon (Thailand); Paksan - Bueng Kan (Thailand); Paktaphan - Pak Saeng (Thailand); Pangmon - Ban Huak (Thailand); Phoudou (Thailand); Dak ta ock - Nam Giang (Vietnam); La Lai (Vietnam); Namkan (Vietnam); Namphao - Cau Treo (Vietnam); Namsoy - Na Meo (Vietnam); Naphao - Cha Lo (Vietnam); Pahang - Long Sap (Vietnam); Panghok - Tây Trang (Vietnam); Phoukeua - Bo Y (Vietnam)) of the 33 border crossings are only open to regular visa holders.; e-Visa may be used to enter Laos through the Luang Prabang, Pakse and Vientiane international airports, 3 Thai-Lao Friendship Bridges (Note: Vientiane (Friendship Bridge 1); Savannakhet (Friendship Bridge 2); Bokeo (Friendship Bridge 4)), in Boten (road and railroad), and in Vientiane (at Khamsavath railway station).; Visa on arrival is available at the Luang Prabang, Pakse and Vientiane international airports, 4 Thai-Lao Friendship Bridges (Note: Vientiane (Friendship Bridge 1); Savannakhet (Friendship Bridge 2); Khammouane (Friendship Bridge 3); Bokeo (Friendship Bridge 4)) and 7 border crossings. (Note: Nongnokkheane - Trapeang Kriel (Cambodia); Boten - Bo han (China); Golden Triangle/Samliemkham (Thailand); Khamsavath railway station (Thailand); Namheuang - Ban Na Kraseng (Thailand); Vang tao - Chongmek (Thailand); Dansavan - Lao Bảo (Vietnam))
Latvia	Visa not required	90 days	90 days within any 180 day period in the Schengen Area
Lebanon	Visa required		
Lesotho	eVisa		
Liberia	e-VOA		
Libya	eVisa		
Liechtenstein	Visa not required	90 days	90 days within any 180 day period in the Schengen Area
Lithuania	Visa not required	90 days	90 days within any 180 day period in the Schengen Area
Luxembourg	Visa not required	90 days	90 days within any 180 day period in the Schengen Area
Madagascar	eVisa / Visa on arrival	90 days	
Malawi	eVisa / Visa on arrival	90 days	
Malaysia	Visa not required	30 days	
Maldives	Free visa on arrival	30 days	
Mali	Visa required		
Malta	Visa not required	90 days	90 days within any 180 day period in the Schengen Area
Marshall Islands	Visa on arrival	90 days	
Mauritania	eVisa		Available at Nouakchott–Oumtounsy International Airport.
Mauritius	Visa not required	90 days	
Mexico	Visa not required	180 days	
Micronesia	Visa not required	30 days	
Moldova	Visa not required	90 days	90 days within any 180 day period
Monaco	Visa not required		
Mongolia	Visa required		
Montenegro	Visa not required	90 days	
Morocco	Visa required		
Mozambique	eVisa/Visa on arrival	30 days	
Myanmar	Visa required		
Namibia	eVisa/Visa on arrival		
Nauru	Visa required		
Nepal	eVisa/Visa on arrival	90 days	
Netherlands	Visa not required	90 days	90 days within any 180 day period in the Schengen Area
New Zealand	Electronic Travel Authority	3 months	International Visitor Conservation and Tourism Levy must be paid upon requesting an Electronic Travel Authority.; Holders of an Australian Permanent Resident Visa or Resident Return Visa may be granted a New Zealand Resident Visa on arrival permitting indefinite stay (pursuant to the Trans-Tasman Travel Arrangement), subject to meeting character requirements and obtaining an Electronic Travel Authority prior to departure. Such travellers are not required to pay the International Visitor Conservation and Tourism Levy.
Nicaragua	Visa not required	90 days	
Niger	Visa required		
Nigeria	eVisa	90 days	
North Macedonia	Visa not required	90 days	
Norway	Visa not required	90 days	90 days within any 180 day period in the Schengen Area
Oman	eVisa	30 days	
Pakistan	Online Visa		
Palau	Free visa on arrival	30 days	
Panama	Visa not required	180 days	
Papua New Guinea	Free eVisa / Visa on arrival	60 days	
Paraguay	Visa required		
Peru	Visa not required	183 days	
Philippines	Visa not required	30 days	
Poland	Visa not required	90 days	90 days within any 180 day period in the Schengen Area
Portugal	Visa not required	90 days	90 days within any 180 day period in the Schengen Area
Qatar	Visa not required	30 days	
Romania	Visa not required	90 days	90 days within any 180 day period in the Schengen Area
Russia	eVisa	30 days	e-Visa holders must arrive and departure via 29 checkpoints
Rwanda	eVisa / Visa on arrival	30 days	
Saint Kitts and Nevis	Electronic Travel Authorisation	3 months	
Saint Lucia	Visa required		
Saint Vincent and the Grenadines	Visa not required	1 month	
Samoa	Visa not required	60 days	
San Marino	Visa not required		
São Tomé and Príncipe	Visa not required	15 days	
Saudi Arabia	Visa required		
Senegal	Visa on arrival	3 months	
Serbia	Visa not required	90 days	
Seychelles	Free Visitor's Permit on arrival	3 months	
Sierra Leone	Visa required		
Singapore	Visa not required	30 days	
Slovakia	Visa not required	90 days	90 days within any 180 day period in the Schengen Area
Slovenia	Visa not required	90 days	90 days within any 180 day period in the Schengen Area
Solomon Islands	Visa required		
Somalia	eVisa	30 days	All visitors must have an approved Electronic Visa (eTAS) before the start of their journey.
South Africa	Visa required		
South Sudan	eVisa		Obtainable online; Printed visa authorisation must be presented at the time of travel
Spain	Visa not required	90 days	90 days within any 180 day period in the Schengen Area
Sri Lanka	ETA / Visa on arrival	30 days	
Sudan	Visa required		
Suriname	Visa not required	90 days	Vatican citizens are not required to pay an entrance fee.; Multiple entry eVisa is also available.
Sweden	Visa not required	90 days	90 days within any 180 day period in the Schengen Area
Switzerland	Visa not required	90 days	90 days within any 180 day period in the Schengen Area
Syria	eVisa		
Taiwan	Visa not required	90 days	
Tajikistan	Visa not required	30 days	Visa also available online.
Tanzania	eVisa / Visa on arrival	3 months	
Thailand	eVisa		
Timor-Leste	Visa on arrival	30 days	
Togo	eVisa	15 days	
Tonga	Visa required		
Trinidad and Tobago	eVisa		
Tunisia	Visa not required	3 months	
Turkey	Visa not required	3 months	
Turkmenistan	Visa required		
Tuvalu	Visa on arrival	1 month	
Uganda	eVisa		May apply online.
Ukraine	Visa not required	90 days	90 days within any 180 day period
United Arab Emirates	Visa not required	30 days	
United Kingdom	Electronic Travel Authorisation	6 months	
United States	Visa required		
Uruguay	Visa not required	90 days	
Uzbekistan	Visa not required	30 days	
Vanuatu	Visa not required	30 days	
Venezuela	Visa required		
Vietnam	eVisa	90 days	Visa free for 30 days when visiting Phú Quốc
Yemen	Visa required		
Zambia	Visa not required	90 days	
Zimbabwe	eVisa / Visa on arrival	3 months	

== Dependent, or restricted territories ==
Visa requirements for Vatican citizens for visits to various territories, and restricted zones:

=== Dependent and autonomous territories ===
Asia
Territory	Conditions of access	Notes
Hong Kong	Visa not required	14 days

== See also ==
- Visa policy of Vatican City
- Visa policy of the Schengen Area
- Vatican passport
