= Vatican City and Holy See passports =

Identity document

Vatican City State passport
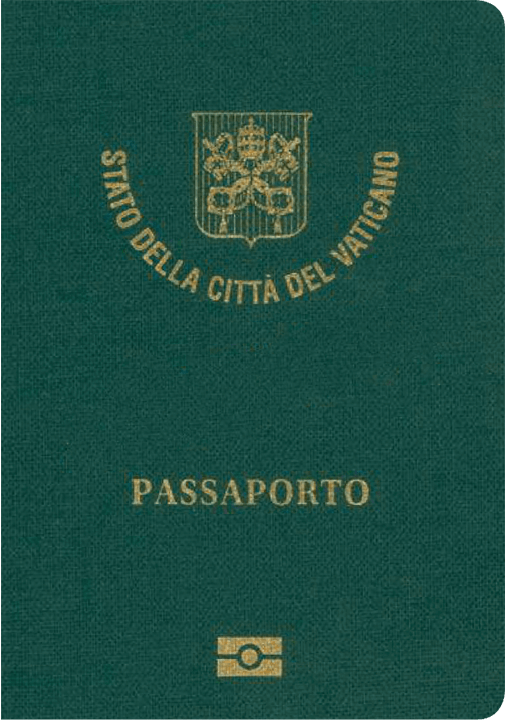
- An ordinary passport of Vatican City State, 2020
- Issued by: Governorate of Vatican City State
- Purpose: Identification & travel
- Eligibility: Vatican citizens only
- Expiration: 5 years (ordinary)

Holy See passport
- A sample Holy See diplomatic passport, 2017
- Issued by: Secretariat of State of the Holy See
- Purpose: Identification & travel
- Eligibility: Vatican citizens or others
- Expiration: 10 years (diplomatic); 5 years (service); 2 years (temporary service)

Vatican City passports and Holy See passports are issued by the Vatican City State and by the Holy See, respectively. Ordinary passports for Vatican City citizens are issued in the name of the Vatican City State, whereas diplomatic and service passports are issued in the name of the Holy See. The Vatican City State and the Holy See are two different subjects of international law, although both share many of the same institutions. They are both under the one sovereign jurisdiction of the pope.

Of the approximately 800 residents of Vatican City, more than 450 have Vatican citizenship. These include the approximately 135 Swiss Guards. About the same number of citizens of the state live in various countries, chiefly in the diplomatic service of the Holy See.

The Vatican City State law on citizenship, residence and access, which was promulgated on 22 February 2011, classifies citizens into three categories:

1. Cardinals resident in Vatican City or in Rome;
2. Diplomats of the Holy See;
3. Persons residing in Vatican City because of their office or service.

Only for the third category is an actual grant of citizenship required.

Diplomatic passports of the Holy See, not passports of the Vatican State, are held by those in the Holy See's diplomatic service.

Service passports of the Holy See can be issued to people in the service of the Holy See even if not citizens of Vatican City.

Vatican City passports are issued to citizens of the state who are not in the service of the Holy See.

Ordinary passports issued by Vatican City and service passports issued by the Holy See are in Italian, French and English; diplomatic passports issued by the Holy See are in Latin, French and English.

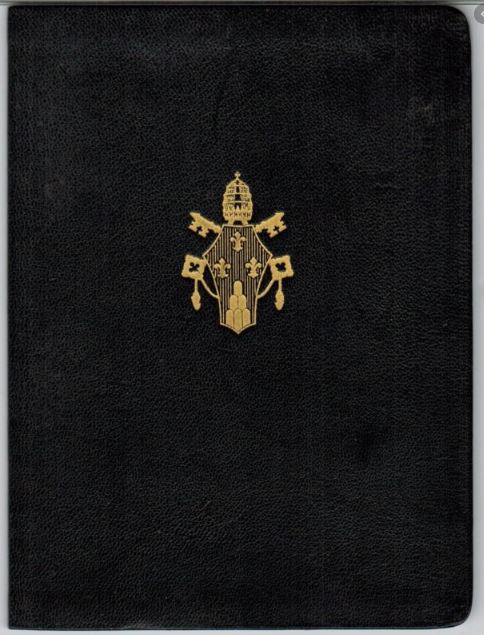
An old Vatican passport with the coat of arms of Pope Paul VI

According to the Henley Passport Index released on January 8, 2025, a Vatican passport allows visa-free, visa-on-arrival, or e-visa entry to 155 countries and territories, ranking 26th in the world.

== See also ==
- Sovereign Military Order of Malta passport
- Italian passport
- Foreign relations of the Holy See
- Legal status of the Holy See
- Visa requirements for Vatican citizens
- Coat of arms of the Holy See and Coat of arms of Vatican City
