= Public funding of the Catholic Church in Italy =

Description of Italian public funding system to Catholic Church

Funding to the Italian Catholic Church from the Italian state includes direct funding and other types of economic and financial burdens, including:

- the otto per mille (Eight per thousand, shares allocated and distribution of unallocated shares)
- funding for non-State-owned Catholic schools and universities
- differentiated funding and contracting for Catholic religious education teachers in public schools
- funding for Catholic media
- funding for infrastructure owned and used by the Vatican State
- funding for religious assistance in public hospitals
- tax exemptions and concessions

These funds and charges are arranged both by bilateral agreements held by the Italian Republic and the Vatican State, such as the Lateran Pacts and related revisions (Agreement of Villa Madama) and customs conventions, and by Italian national and local laws.

== Education and research ==
=== Public non State-owned Catholic schools ===
The following are exempt from the tax: [...]
i) real estate used by the persons referred to in Article 87, paragraph 1, letter c), of the unified text of income taxes, approved by Presidential Decree No. 917 of December 22, 1986, as amended, intended exclusively for the performance of welfare, social security, health, educational, receptive, cultural, recreational and sports activities, as well as the activities referred to in Article 16, letter a), of Law No. 222 of May 20, 1985.

— Decree 30 dicembre 1992, nr. 504

Non-State-owned schools, about 63 percent of which are run by the Catholic Church, currently receive public money in the form of:

- direct subsidies, for the management of preschools and elementary school
- funding of projects aimed at raising the quality and effectiveness of educational offerings in middle and high schools
- grants to families ("school vouchers" for schools of all grades).

Funding is delegated from the State to the administrative regions by Legislative Decree No. 112 of 32/03/2021, Art. 138, in which the scope of contributions to non-State-owned schools is delegated.

==== Article 33 of the Italian Constitution ====
Article 33 of the Constitution of the Italian Republic affirms that "Institutions and private individuals have the right to establish schools and educational institutions, without charge to the State."

This article has several political interpretations, including mainly:

- the State, while recognizing the right to establish non-State-owned schools, cannot and should not bear any kind of burden of non-State-owned schools
- the State must support families' freedom of choice of educational institution by funding non-State-owned schools in the same way as public schools

However, since 1992 various national and regional laws, decrees and ministerial circulars (including DM 261/98, DM 279/99, law 62/2000, DM 27/2005) have established direct and indirect funding for non-State-owned schools.

It has also been pointed out that the average cost of educating a student in a non-State-owned school, compared with that of a State school, is lower. This difference in average expenditure, assuming zero fixed costs, would result in savings of 6 billion euros annually to the Italian state.

==== Direct grants ====
Ministerial Decree 261/98 and Ministerial Decree 279/99 (Minister of Education Luigi Berlinguer, Democrats of the Left), consolidated in the single law text «Concessione di contributi alle scuole secondarie legalmente riconosciute e pareggiate» (Granting of contributions to legally recognized and peer secondary schools) are the regulatory bases that allow the regular granting of funding to non-State-owned schools.

The D'Alema bis government's Law 62/2000 ratified the full entry of non-State-owned schools into the national education system, which must therefore be treated equally to state schools in economic terms as well. The law also provides:

- the application also to non state-owned schools of the tax treatment reserved for nonprofit entities, if they meet the requirements of Article 10 of Legislative Decree No. 460 of December 4, 1997 (art. 8)
- the de facto establishment of state school vouchers (funding of 300 billion lire as of 2001) (art. 12)
- the increase of 60 billion lire in the funding for grants for the maintenance of parochial elementary schools (art. 13)
- the increase of 280 billion lire in the appropriation for the costs of participation in the implementation of the integrated pre-school system (art.13)
- the appropriation of a fund of 7 billion liras for schools accommodating the disabled (art. 14), since for Italian schools the accommodation of the disabled is mandatory

In 2005 the amount of grants to non state-owned was 527 million euros (circolare ministeriale 38/2005).

==== Buoni scuola ====
The Buoni scuola ("school grants") was sat up in 2000 by second D'Alema government by law 62/2000 (art. 9–12) regarding school equality with a special funding that providing an amount of 250 mln liras (about 130 thousand euros) for the year 2000 and 300 mln liras (about 160 thousand euros) per year starting from year 2001, put into law by second Berlusconi government by the law 289/2002 (art. 2, com. 7) that sat up a spending cap of 30 mln euros for the three-year period 2003–2005.

=== Religious education teachers ===
Law 186/2003, passed by the Berlusconi government with the support of La Margherita and Udeur, defines the legal status of Catholic religious education teachers at all levels.

Eligibility for teaching Catholic religion is given by the Diocesan Ordinary (Art. 3, par. 4), a territorial official of the Catholic Church. Previously, given the only legislation that stipulates that the State compulsorily organizes the hour of religion teaching but that students can join it optionally, the state hired religious education teachers only on annual contracts; however, following the enactment of Law 186, Catholic religion teachers are hired by the State on a permanent basis (Art.3, par. 8), with legal status and economic treatment equivalent to all other teachers. Previously, economic treatment was only equated with that of tenured teachers, but all other rights due to civil servants were lacking.

In addition, for all the 15,000 teachers of Catholic religion education who have become civil servants since 2003, any revocation of their certification by the Diocesan Ordinary means that the state is obliged to provide for their alternative employment, as is the case for all other civil servants not deemed fit to perform their duties.

=== Catholic universities ===
Law 293/2003 gives legislative recognition to the Istituto di studi politici San Pio V by funding it at 1.5 million euros annually. The institute, based in Rome, is a promoter of the creation of the St. Pius V Free University of Studies, also in Rome.

Several funding laws have allocated significant sums for Catholic universities:

- Law 350/2003: funding of 20 million euros in 2004 and 30 million euros in 2005 to be allocated to the Università Campus Bio-Medico, established and promoted by Opus Dei, for the partial construction of a university polyclinic, for the strengthening of biomedical research in Italy (art.4, paragraph 167).
- Law 311/2004: funding of 15 million euros for the Fondazione Centro San Raffaele del Monte Tabor, founded by Don Luigi Verzè, which carries out clinical, research and educational activities, as well as holding shares of various commercial activities (hotels, catering, transportation, agribusiness) (art.1, paragraph 187).

In 2004, the government, through the National Committee for the Evaluation of the University System, established several additional non-state, legally recognized universities, including the European University of Rome, founded by the religious institute of the Legionaries of Christ.

In 2017, the total economic allocations from Miur, by law 243/1991 have got to 68.605.000 euro, of which 41.827.905 to the eight Catholic universities.

== Religious care in public hospitals ==
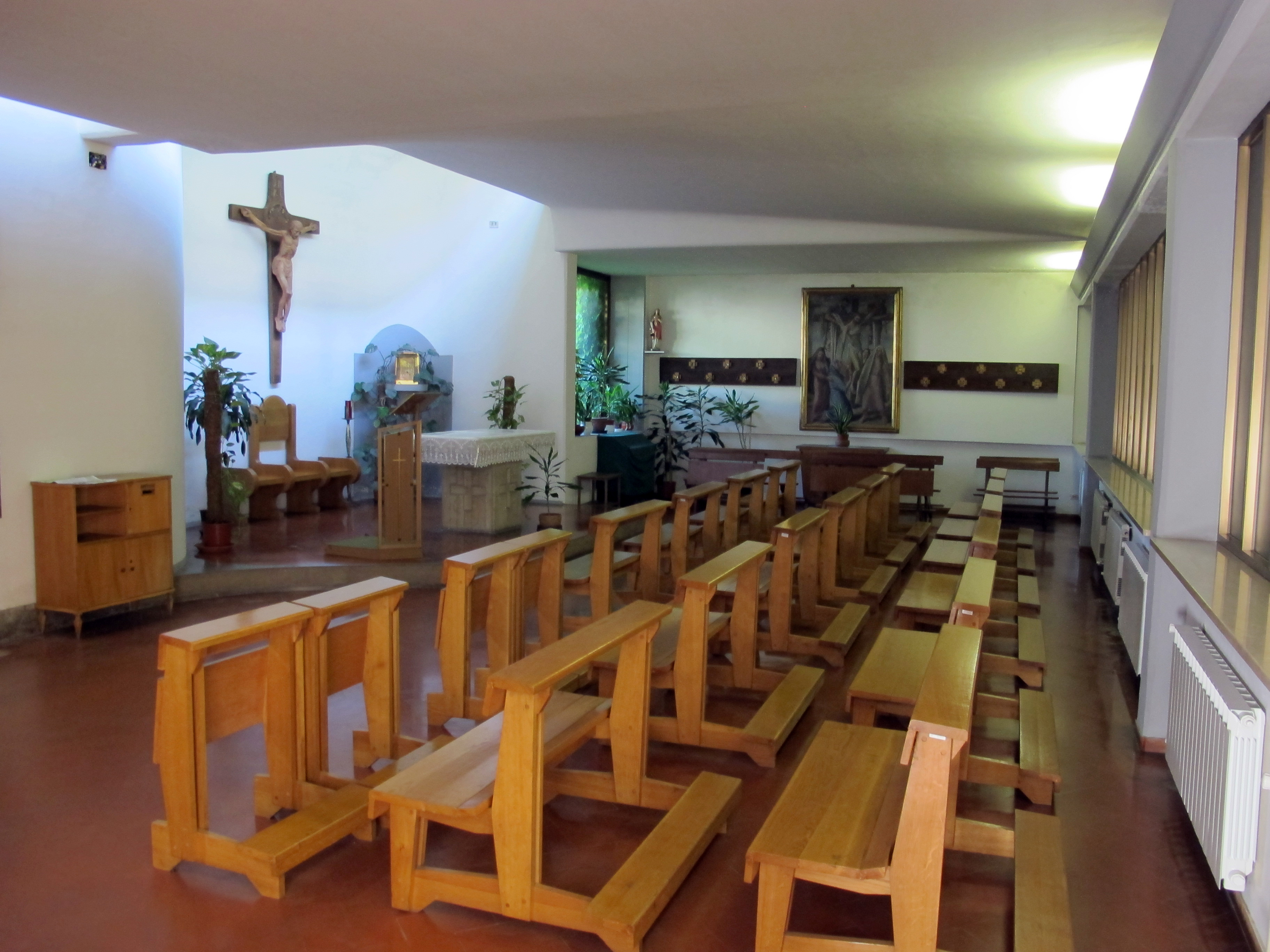
Religious chapel in Pietro Palagi hospital in Florence

The Villa Madama Agreement, states in Art. 11 that the "...Italian Republic ensures that... hospitalization in hospitals, nursing homes or public care homes... may not give rise to any impediment in the exercise of religious freedom or in the fulfillment of religious practices of Catholics," and that the "... spiritual assistance to them is provided by clergymen appointed by the competent Italian authorities upon designation of the ecclesiastical authority and according to the legal status, staffing and modalities established by agreement between those authorities.".

Religious assistance is also provided at the national health level by Article 38 of Law No. 833/1978, concerning the Establishment of the National Health Service, according to which "... religious assistance shall be ensured with respect for the will and freedom of conscience of the citizen. To this end, the local health unit shall provide for the ordering of the religious assistance service ..."

From 2000 to 2005, several Italian administrative regions, governed by various political alignments, agreed with the presidents of regional bishops' conferences schemes of understanding for religious assistance in public hospitals. In particular, the one between the Regione Lombardia, signed by Roberto Formigoni, President of the Region, and Cardinal Dionigi Tettamanzi, dated March 21, 2005, stipulates that in all public and non-state health care facilities there must be at least one religious assistant, two in facilities with more than 300 beds, and one for every 350 in facilities with more than 700 beds (Art. 6). Religious assistants must be hired by the host hospital facility, which is also responsible for providing: space for worship services and religious activity (church or chapel and sacristy), furnished and on-site housing for religious assistants, offices, furniture, furnishings, equipment, as well as all expenses necessary for their maintenance, lighting and heating (Art. 1, 2, 4, 10). Health care assistants are hired on a permanent basis with a classification provided for in the National Collective Bargaining Agreement for the health sector in band D, typical of nurses, that is, with a net salary of about €1900 gross monthly.

== Radio and television ==
In the 2005 Finance Act, 1 million euros is allocated for technological enhancement and upgrading in the radio sector. Entities eligible for the subsidy are those listed in paragraph 190 of the 2004 Finance Act, namely: the "national radio stations of communities" The only two radio stations that meet the requirement are Radio Padania Libera, a radio station of the party Lega Nord, and Radio Maria, a Catholic radio station.

== Otto per mille (Eight per thousand) ==
Italian tax regulations provide the possibility for citizens to finance - with 0.8 percent of the total personal income tax collected by the state - religious confessions recognized by the State, which have entered into an agreement with it (lesser forms of financing are reserved for non-religious subjects, such as the five per thousand and two per thousand). Alternatively, the preference for allocation of the eight per thousand may be directed to the State itself or not expressed. The distribution of the portion of the eight per thousand not directly allocated (due to non-expression of preference by taxpayers) takes place in proportion to the amount allocated instead by explicit expression of preference.

In addition, starting from 2005 with the Berlusconi government (decree published in the Official Gazette of 26/1/2005), a substantial part of the funds that citizens have allocated to the state were allocated to the financing of restoration works of religious properties and buildings of historical and artistic value, often owned by the Catholic Church (in 2005 for a total of about 10 million euros, 10% of the total 100 million share allocated to the state).

Some expenditure items in 2005:

- Pontificia Università Gregoriana (Roma), euros 370.000
- Curia Generalizia Casa di Santa Brigida (Roma), euros 400.000 (used for the routine and extraordinary maintenance of the Hermitage of the Most Holy Savior of Neaples, purchased with state funds for the Giubileo del 2000)
- Seminario vescovile di Fiesole, euros 200.000
- Venerabile Confraternita Santa Maria della Purità (Gallipoli, Lecce), euros 300.000
- Opera preservazione della fede (Ventimiglia, Imperia), euros 420.000
- Opera Pia Casa Regina Coeli (Napoli) euros 40.000
- Associazione Volontari per il Servizio Internazionale (non-governmental organization member of the Compagnia delle Opere, Forlì, euros 203.000 for a food delivery project in Democratic Republic of the Congo)

Similar expenditure items have been confirmed in subsequent years as well.

== Tax benefits ==
The decree of the 30th of December 1992, nr. 504, emitted during first Amato government, has long been the landmark regulation for ICI regulation (Imposta Comunale sugli Immobili, i.e. municipal tax on property ownership), subsequently substituted by IMU regulation (Single Municipal Tax) in 2012. It provides for the taxation of property ownership, from which nonprofit organizations and religious denominations with which the state has entered into an agreement are exempt, when the property has a social utility use or when it is related to religion.

The decree, in Article 7, lists exemptions from the tax. Specifically, paragraph (i) states that:

The text then refers, in part, to two other pieces of legislation that give definitions of who is subject to the tax and the uses of real estate:

- subjects: all subjects excluded from the "taxable persons" specified in Article 73 of the TUIR are not subject to the tax, i.e., all subjects that are not "companies" and that are not "public and private entities other than companies, as well as trusts, resident in the territory of the State, whose exclusive or main purpose is the exercise of commercial activities". This corresponds to the definition of a so-called nonprofit entity.
- uses: the uses that must be given to real estate in order for it to be exempt are defined by Art. i'art. 16 della legge 222/1985, in which uses for religious activities are distinguished, from the group "(a) activities of religion or worship those directed to the exercise of worship and the care of souls, the training of clergy and religious, missionary purposes, catechesis, Christian education," for which the exemption applies, other than non-religious activities, from the group "(b) activities other than those of religion or worship those of assistance and charity, education, education and culture and, in any case, commercial or for-profit activities. ", for which the exemption on the grounds of "religious activity" does not apply.

== Funding for the infrastructure of Vatican State ==
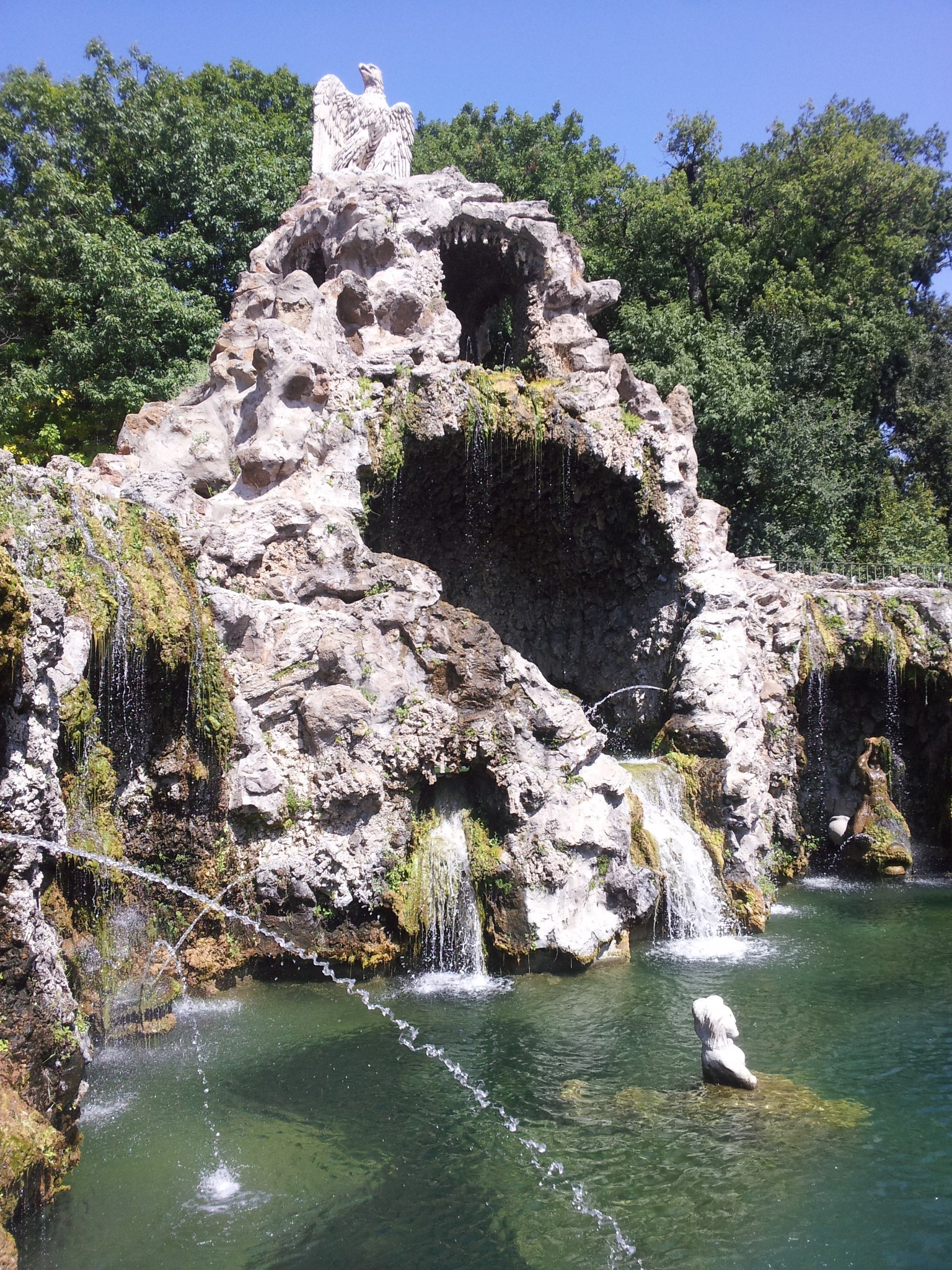
Fontana dell'Aquilone, Vatican City

Article 6 of the Lateran Treaty makes the water supply of the Vatican City completely free of charge, at the expense of the Italian state.

In addition, there is a tax break on the supply of natural gas to the Vatican territory and to agreed properties that exempts them from consumption taxes (including excise taxes and regional surcharges) because in the Italy-Vatican Customs Convention of June 30, 1930 these supplies are considered as export disposals ("cessioni all'esportazione").

The Italian State's lost expenses and missed revenues for this chapter have been estimated as amounting to about 5 million euros per year.

== Controversy about non secular funding ==
The various grants have repeatedly produced controversy over possible inconsistency with the principle of secularism envisioned by the Constitution of Italy, especially regarding the grants not stipulated by Lateran Treaty. Criticism has come from various political parties, associations, newspapers and journalists as Curzio Maltese, as well as personalities form the world of culture as Piergiorgio Odifreddi.

== See also ==
- Church tax
- Otto per mille
- Lateran Treaty
- Catholic school
- Freedom of religion in Italy
- Holy See-Italy relations

== Regulatory references ==
- Law June 24, 1929, nr. 810, regarding "Esecuzione del Trattato, dei quattro allegati annessi e del Concordato, sottoscritti in Roma, fra la Santa Sede e l'Italia, l'11 febbraio 1929 - VII. (029U0810) (GU n.130 del 5-6-1929)"
- Regio decreto February 28, 1930, nr. 289, regarding "Norme per l'attuazione della legge 24 giugno 1929, n. 1159, sui culti ammessi nello Stato e per il coordinamento di essa con le altre leggi dello Stato"
- Legge n. 833/197, "Istituzione del servizio sanitario nazionale", December 23, 1978
- Accordo tra la Santa Sede e la Repubblica Italiana che apporta modificazione al Concordato Lateranense, February 18, 1984
- Law 186/2003, "Norme sullo stato giuridico degli insegnanti di religione cattolica degli istituti e delle scuole di ogni ordine e grado", July 18, 2003
