= Coat of arms of the Holy See =

- The coat of arms of the Holy See

Versions

- Adopted: Late 14th century

The coat of arms of the Holy See combines two crossed keys and a tiara, used as the official emblem of the Holy See, and by extension, the wider Catholic Church. These forms have origins attested from the 14th century. The combination of one gold and one silver key is a somewhat later development.

The coat of arms of the Holy See as an emblem was filed in 1996 at the World Organization for Intellectual Property. This coat of arms without shield is displayed on the front cover of the Holy See passports.

== Origins and background ==
Ecclesiastical heraldry had the same origin and developed contemporaneously with general heraldry, which had become general throughout England, France, Italy and Germany by the end of the 12th century. Ecclesiastical heraldry appears first in seals, nearly all vesica-shaped.

When Pope Gregory IX waged war against Emperor Frederick II in 1228, papal troops were described by Richard of San Germano as "bearing the sign of the keys" (clavigeros hostes or clavesignati). The keys appeared on their banners and were sewn onto their clothing over their breasts. The conflict is consequently called War of the Keys.

=== Keys and their arrangement ===
The earliest blazoning of the arms of the Holy See is that found in Froissart's Chronicles of 1353, which describes them as "gules two keys in saltire argent". From the beginning of the 14th century, the arms of the Holy See had shown this arrangement of two crossed keys, most often with a gold key in bend and a silver in bend sinister, but sometimes with both keys or (gold), less often both keys silver, as described by Froissart.

The practice by which the gold key is placed in bend and the silver in bend sinister was slow in establishing itself, and only from the time of Pope Pius II is it found with certainty. "The practice of placing a gold key in bend over another in bend sinister of silver is not found with any certainty before the time of Pius II (1458–64)".

In 1952–1953 the English Heraldry Society gave the blazon of the arms of the Holy See as "Gules a key or [("gold" or "yellow" in heraldic terminology)] in bend above a key argent [("silver" or "white" in heraldic terminology)] in bend sinister, both wards upwards, the bows united by a cord or, above the shield a tiara, its three crowns or [("gold")], the mitre argent [("silver")]". In his 1978 book, Heraldry in the Catholic Church, Archbishop Bruno Heim described the same arrangement.

=== Sede vacante ===
The sede vacante emblem

The gold key is placed in bend also in the sede vacante emblem, with the tiara replaced by an umbraculum (umbrella) said to represent the absence of a pope and the temporary governance of the Camerlengo of the Holy Roman Church over the temporal affairs of the Holy See, and in the arms of the Papal States.

=== Tiara ===
By the end of Froissart's 14th century the papal tiara was included in the coat of arms of the Holy See according to Galbreath and Insegne e simboli: araldica pubblica e privata medievale e moderna. Claudio Ceresa, on the other hand, says the earliest known evidence of its adoption dates from the following century, in the pontificate of Martin V (1417–1431).

== Papal States and Vatican City ==
The Montefeltro family arms with the addition of the papal insignia acquired by Federico III as Gonfalonier of the Church.

The distinction between the coat of arms of the papacy and that of the territory ruled by it dates back at least to the 16th century. Galbreath states: "From the 16th century on, this, the third coat of the Papacy – which may be blazoned Gules a pair of keys crossed in saltire, one gold, one silver, tied gold, surmounted by a tiara silver, crowned gold – is taken to represent the Papacy as distinct from the Papal States." This statement is quoted with approval by Heim.

The arms of the Papal States differed in having the umbraculum (the emblem of the Pope's temporal powers) in place of the tiara, and were incorporated as the first quartering of the royal coat of arms of the Napoleonic Kingdom of Italy (1805–1814).

== Charges on the escutcheon ==
Claudio Ceresa says that the oldest known representation of the crossed keys beneath the papal tiara dates from the pontificate of Martin V (1417–1431), whose successor, Eugene IV (1431–1447), included it in the design of a silver coin. Galbreath and Insegne e simboli: araldica pubblica e privata medievale e moderna say it is attested from the previous century.

=== Keys ===
The keys refer to the promise of Jesus Christ to Peter: "I will entrust to you the keys of the kingdom of heaven. Whatever you declare bound on earth shall be bound in heaven; whatever you declare loosed on earth shall be loosed in heaven" (Matthew 16:19). They are a symbol of the power the Catholic Church believes that Christ gave to Saint Peter and his successors. The gold key signifies that the power reaches to heaven and the silver key that it extends to all the faithful on earth, their interlacing indicates the linking between the two aspects of the power, and the handles of the key being at the base symbolize the power being in the hands of the pope.

=== Tiara ===
While actual wearing of the papal tiara has been discontinued by John Paul I and his successors, it remains a papal heraldic symbol. A crown was added to the headgear of the Pope in 1130 to symbolize sovereignty over the Papal States. In 1301, Boniface VIII, at that time in conflict with Philip IV of France, added a second crown to indicate that his spiritual authority was superior to any civil power. In 1342, Benedict XII added a third crown to symbolize the superiority of papal religious authority over that of non-religious monarchs. The original significance of the three crowns was lost over time and they came to represent instead the pope's powers as priest, ruler, and teacher.

== Official variations ==
A coloured artistic illustration of the coat of arms similar to the shown on the Holy See website.

Non-coloured version of the coat of arms displayed on the Vatican Library website and the Holy See website

A variation of the coat of arms displayed on the Permanent Observer Mission of the Holy See to the United Nations website

Emblem of the Holy See displayed on the official Holy See website since May 2025

== See also ==
- Papal coats of arms
- Coat of arms of Vatican City
- Flag of Vatican City
- Vatican City and Holy See passports
- Foreign relations of the Holy See
