= Index of Vatican City–related articles =

This is an index of Vatican City–related topics.

== 0-9 ==
- 00120 (Vatican postcode)

== A ==
- Acta Apostolicae Sedis
- Angels Unawares
- Anima Mundi museum
- Anniversary of the Election of the Holy Father
- Anthem
- Apostolic Nunciature
- Apostolic Palace
- Architecture of Vatican City
- Archives
  - Archive of the Dicastery for the Doctrine of the Faith
- Association of Vatican Lay Workers

== B ==
- Basilica di Santa Maria Maggiore
- Bibliotheca Palatina
- Bishop of Rome
- Borders of Vatican City
- Borgia Apartments
- Bramante Staircase
- Brazil–Holy See relations

== C ==
- Capital punishment in Vatican City
- Cappella Giulia
- Cappella Paolina
- Cardinal Secretary of State
- Casina Pio IV
- Catholic Church
- Catholic Church in Vatican City
- Christianity
- Christmas in Vatican City
- Circus of Nero
- Clementine Hall
- Coat of arms of Vatican City
- Collection of Modern Religious Art
- College of Cardinals
- Corps of Firefighters of the Vatican City State
- Corps of Gendarmerie of Vatican City
- Cortile del Belvedere
- Crime in Vatican City

== D ==
- Dark Rome Tours & Walks
- Domus Sanctae Marthae
- Door of the Dead in St. Peter's Basilica

== E ==
- Easter in Vatican City
- Economy of Vatican City

== F ==
- Flag of Vatican City
- Foreign relations of the Holy See
- Fountains of St. Peter's Square
- Fundamental Law of Vatican City State

== G ==
- Gallery of Maps
- Gallery of Sistine Chapel ceiling
- Gardens of Vatican City
- Geography of Vatican City
- Governor of Vatican City
- Governor's Palace
- Gregorian Tower
- Grotta di Lourdes

== H ==
- History of the Catholic Church since 1962
- History of the Papacy
- Holy See
- Holy See–Israel relations
- Holy See–Italy relations
- Holy See–Mexico relations
- Holy See–Palestine relations
- Holy See–Philippines relations
- Holy See–Poland relations
- Holy See–Soviet Union relations
- Holy See–Switzerland relations
- Holy See–United States relations
- Holy See Press Office
- Homelessness in Vatican City

== I ==
- Index Librorum Prohibitorum
- Italy-Vatican City border

== L ==
- L'Osservatore Romano (Vatican City newspaper)
- L'Osservatore della Domenica
- Languages of Vatican City
- Lateran Basilica
- Lateran Palace
- Lateran Treaty
- Lateran Treaty Day
- Law of Vatican City
- Legal status of the Holy See
- Leonine City
- LGBT rights in Vatican City
- List of diplomatic missions of the Holy See
- List of newspapers in Vatican City

== M ==
- Mater Ecclesiae (monastery)
- Military of Vatican City
- Monument to the Royal Stuarts
- Music of Vatican City

== N ==
- National Anthem of Vatican City
- Niccoline Chapel
- Noble Guard

== O ==
- Octava Dies
- Old St. Peter's Basilica
- Outline of Vatican City

== P ==
- Palace of the Holy Office
- Palazzi Pontifici
- Papal Apartments
- Papal Concert to Commemorate the Shoah
- Papal conclave (Papal elections)
- Papal coronation
- Papal Gentleman
- Papal household
- Papal inauguration
- Papal States
- Papal tiara
- Papal tombs
- Papal tombs in Old St. Peter's Basilica
- Passetto di Borgo
- Paul VI Audience Hall
- Pauline Chapel
- Philatelic and Numismatic Office of the Vatican City State
- Pietà (Michelangelo)
- Pius Wars
- Politics of Vatican City
- Pontifical Academy of Sciences
- Pontifical Academy of Social Sciences
- Pontifical Commission
  - Pontifical Commission for Vatican City State
- Pontifical Swiss Guard
- Pope
- Pope Benedict XVI
- Pope Francis
- Popemobile
- Population of Vatican City
- Porta San Pellegrino
- Postage stamps and postal history of Vatican City
- Poste Vaticane
- Prefecture of the Pontifical Household
- Presidents of the Pontifical Commission
- Prisoner in the Vatican
- Properties of the Holy See
- Public holidays in Vatican City

== R ==
- Rail transport in Vatican City
- Raphael Rooms
- Redemptoris Mater Chapel
- Restoration of the Sistine Chapel frescoes
- Ricciolo d'Italia
- Roman Catholic Church
- Roman Curia
- Roman Historical Institutes
- Room of Tears

== S ==
- Saint John's Tower
- St. Peter's Baldachin
- Saint Peter's Basilica
- Saint Peter's chair
- St. Peter's Square
- St. Peter's Square Fountains
- Saint Peter's tomb
- Sala Regia
- San Pellegrino in Vaticano
- Sant'Anna dei Palafrenieri
- Santa Maria della Pietà in Camposanto dei Teutonici
- Saints Martin and Sebastian of the Swiss
- Santo Stefano degli Abissini
- Santo Stefano degli Ungheresi
- Savoyard Era
- Scala Regia
- Secretariat for Communications
- Secretariat for the Economy
- Secretariat of State
- Sistine Chapel
- Sistine Chapel ceiling
- Sistine Chapel Choir
- Sport in Vatican City
- Swiss Guard

== T ==
- Telephone numbers in Vatican City
- Teutonic Cemetery
- The Last Judgment by Michelangelo
- The Resurrection sculpture
- The Story of the Vatican, 1941 documentary
- Timeline of fictional stories set in Vatican City
- Time in Vatican City
- Tomb of the Julii
- Tourism in Vatican City
- Transport in Vatican City

== U ==
- Universi Dominici Gregis

== V ==
- .va (Vatican City internet sites)
- Vatican Advanced Technology Telescope
- Vatican Amateur Sports Association
- Vatican Athletics
- Vatican Bank
- Vatican Christmas Tree
- Vatican City
- Vatican City Championship
- Vatican City culture
- Vatican City during World War II
- Vatican City football team
- Vatican City-Italy border
- Vatican Climate Forest
- Vatican Constitution
- Vatican Cricket Team
- Vatican euro coins
- Vatican Grottoes
- Vatican Heliport
- Vatican Hill
- Vatican Historical Museum
- Vatican Information Service
- Vatican leaks scandal
- Vatican Library
- Vatican lira
- Vatican loggias
- Vatican Museums
- Vatican Necropolis
- Vatican News
- Vatican Observatory
- Vatican Pharmacy
- Vatican Publishing House
- Vatican Radio
- Vatican Radio lawsuit
- Vatican Secret Archives
- Vatican Television Center
- Via della Conciliazione
- Vicar General

== W ==
- Women in Vatican City
- World Heritage Sites in Southern Europe (The Vatican is included)

== See also ==
- Index of Catholic Church articles
- Lists of country-related topics – similar lists for other countries
