= Dark Rome Tours & Walks =

Italian thematic tour company

Dark Rome Tours is a tour company which offers guided tours in Rome, the Vatican, Florence, Venice, Milan and Paris. They specialize in small group tours which access to major historical and cultural sites without waiting in line. As well as walking and bus tours, Dark Rome offers thematic day tours from Rome (visiting Pompeii, Ostia Antica, Florence, Tuscany and Tivoli), Florence (visiting Tuscany) and Paris (visiting the Loire Valley).

== History ==
Dark Rome Tours was started in 2002 as a single tour, taking tourists around the historic center of Rome and telling the legends and ghost stories attached to its buildings. While the company still operates its night tour of the Roman ruins and landmarks, since then it has expanded its operations across Italy to the rest of Rome, the Vatican, Florence, Milan and Venice in languages including English, Spanish, German, French and Portuguese. In 2010 Dark Rome launched its first tour in Paris under the name of My Parisian Tour.

In 2012, Dark Rome became an Official Vatican Museums Partner. As part of the partnership, Dark Rome gained access to a separate partners' entrance at the Vatican Museums, The company has since developed its range of tours there, including a VIP tour, with access to ‘secret rooms’ of the Vatican previously closed to the general public, such as the Bramante Staircase and the Niccoline Chapel, as well as access to the Sistine Chapel after closing time.

== See also ==
- Index of Vatican City-related articles
