= Papal heraldry =

Papal heraldry may refer to:

- Papal coats of arms
- Coat of arms of the Holy See
- Coat of arms of Vatican City
