= Architecture of Vatican City =

Vatican City is home to some of the world's most striking architecture through several centuries and a world cultural heritage. The area of the Vatican is small, which is made up of several famous landmarks. The architecture of Vatican City, dominated by religious architecture, is characterized by several architectural styles such as Roman, Gothic, and Baroque with the different time, most representative the buildings are concentrated in the medieval period and the 16th–18th centuries.

== Periodization ==
=== Roman period ===
There are few examples of Roman architecture in the Vatican City. In the 4th century AD, Emperor Constantine I built a basilica over a small shrine believed to mark the burial place of St. Peter. The Constantine's basilica is the predecessor of St. Peter's Basilica. The windows were small and higher from the ground which let the basilica be a dark place with dingy light, making the surrounding mysterious. In terms of the aesthetic aspect of Roman architecture, Constantine's basilica reflects the characteristics of Roman architecture is huge and complex, emphasizing the contrast between light and dark (allowing light to shine in from the small hole of the morning star), but the decoration of the building is simple and rough. In terms of technical processing, Constantine's basilica reflects the design and construction of Romanesque buildings are based on vaults, covering the space with a curved structure of stones. Constantine's basilica also reflects the art form of Roman architecture has a primary and secondary relationship which the building is dominant, while other artistic activities, such as painting, sculpture are in a subsidiary position.

=== Renaissance (14th-16th century) ===
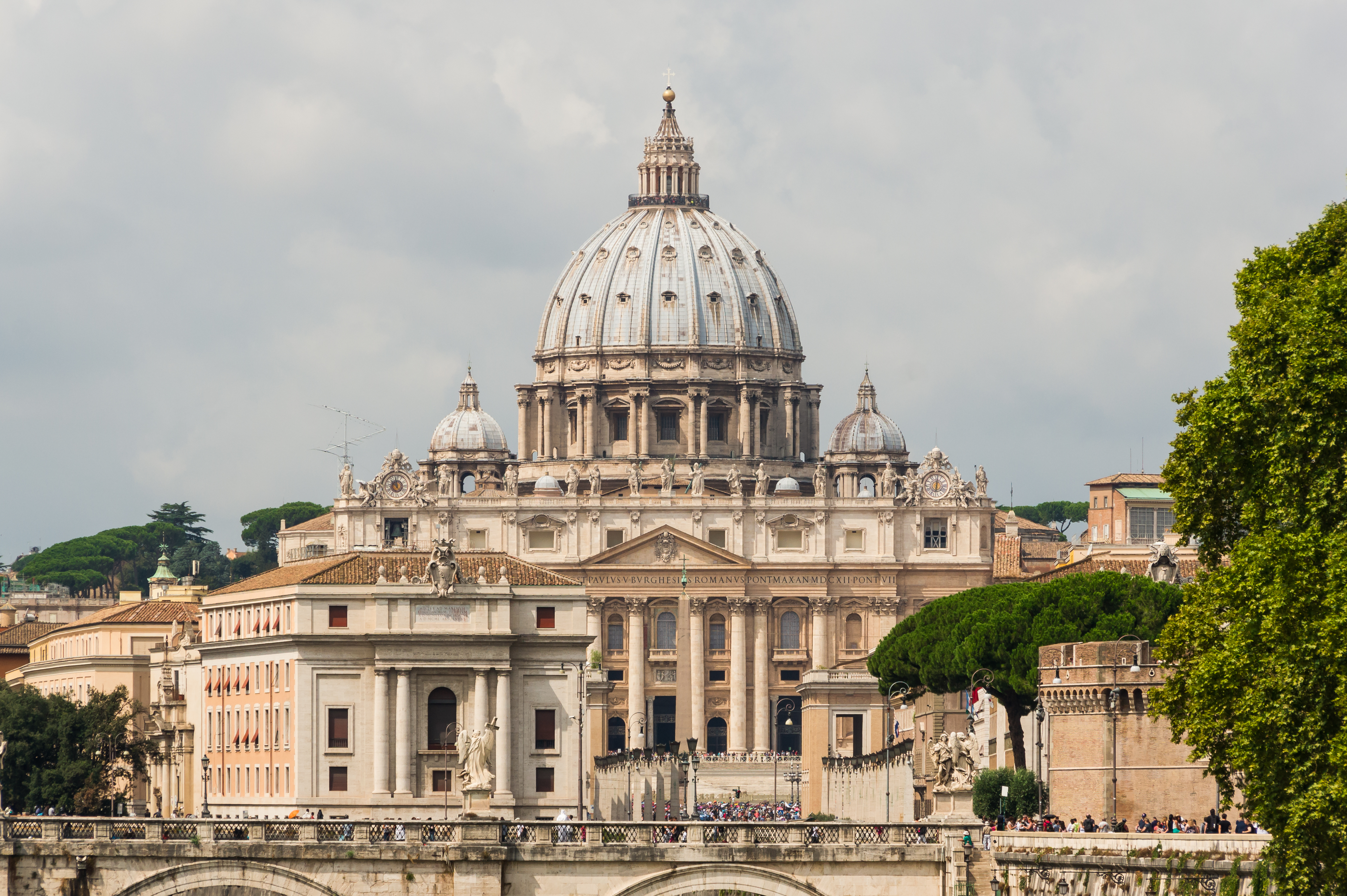
St. Peter's Basilica, the most renowned work of Renaissance architecture

The early Renaissance (14–15th century) took place in Florence, followed by a Roman Renaissance from the mid-15th to the mid-16th centuries. The Vatican Library and the Sistine Chapel were built in the 15th century. Pope Nicholas V began in 1447 the construction of the Apostolic Palace, founded the Vatican Library and commissioned the architect Bernardo Rossellino the design of the new St. Peter's Basilica and the painter Fra Angelico the decoration of the Niccoline Chapel.

In 1471, Pope Sixtus IV commissioned the construction of a new chapel, the Sistine Chapel, which is one of the main attractions inside the Vatican Museums, with the pictorial decoration from artists like Sandro Botticelli and Pietro Perugino, that later on in 1508 Michelangelo Buonarroti repainted by orders of Pope Julius II. These architectures reflect the characteristics in the 15th century which most of the buildings looks like courtyards, three floors, built on the street, the plane tends to be compact and tidy, and only one facade is highlighted in the shape. Under the patronage of the pope, the heyday of Renaissance (first half of the 16th century) took place in the historic center of Rome, which now is part of the Vatican City.

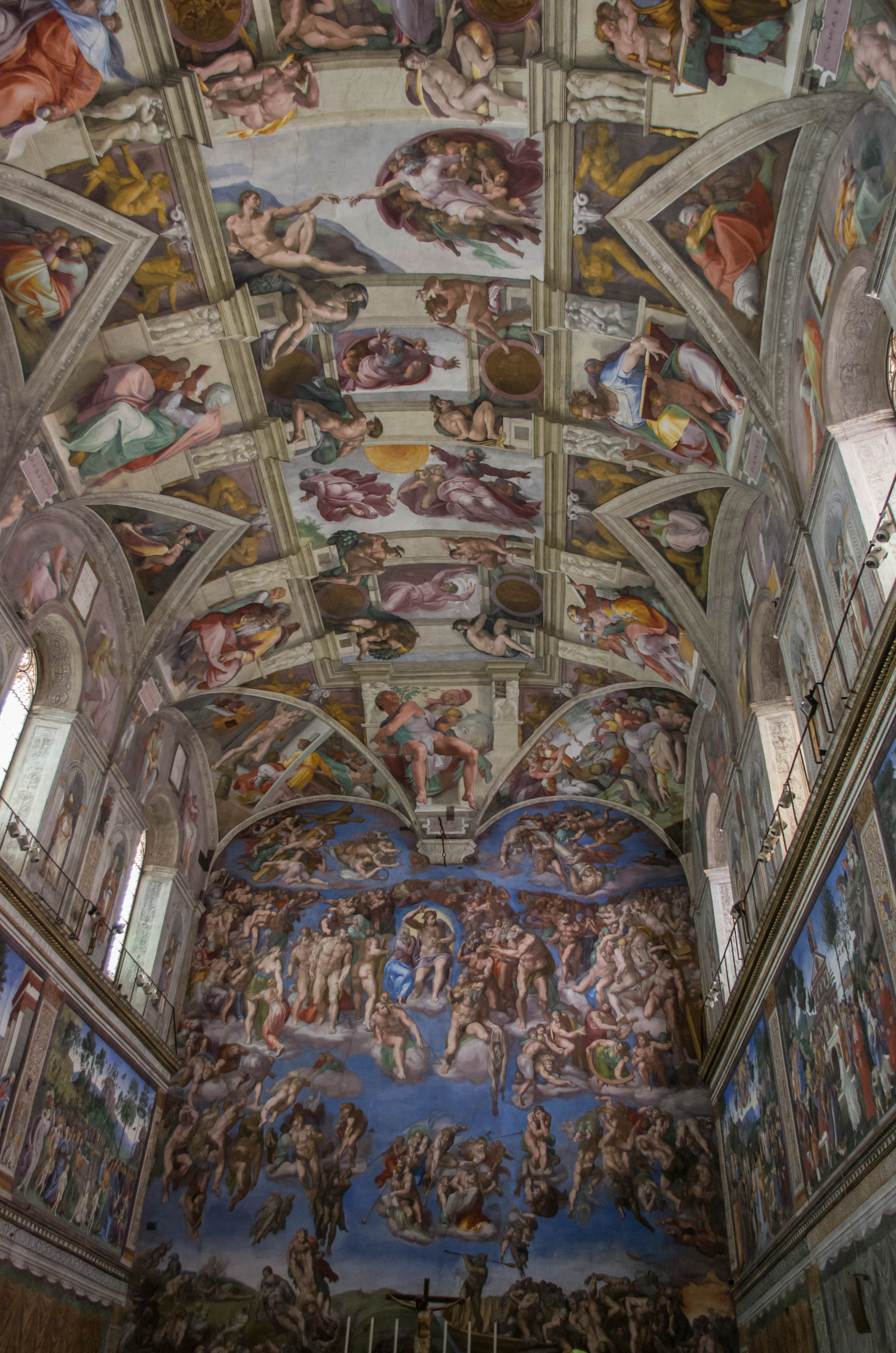
Michelangelo's frescoes in the Sistine Chapel

During the Renaissance, European society experienced a renewal of interest in the ideas and artistic techniques of the Greco-Roman classical world. This led to features and motifs from classical architecture being featured prominently in the design of much of the Vatican's buildings, most notably in the case of St Peter's Basilica.

The structure of the architecture draws on the technique of small churches in Eastern Europe, uses the drum base to construct the dome, and becomes the center of the city outline. It is the symbol of the original spirit of the Renaissance.

Under the Renaissance, the culture of humanism and the new architecture reviving the classical culture. There is another characteristic which is the combination of city and square. The reconstruction of the city during the Renaissance pursued solemn symmetry, and many ideal urban solutions emerged. Architects achieved great success of square during the Renaissance. The square generally has a theme, surrounded by ancillary buildings. For example, St. Peter's Square is religion and St. Peter's Basilica surrounded St. Peter's Square. In terms of single building, the design method is innovative, and there are many new creations, rigorous graphic design, symmetry, balance, development according to the axis, and the facade is also regular, such as St. Peter's Basilica using the classical column instead of using the Gothic style which symbolizes the gods. This innovative method becomes an important architectural modeling during the 16th century. All of the Casino of Pius IV, the Cortile del Belvedere and Vatican palaces which consist Sistine chapel, Raphael rooms, Borgia apartments and clementine hall and the Cortile del Belvedere were built before the end of the 16th century, under the direction of following the genius of the same architects who had built Saint Peter and the same popes.

=== Baroque period (17th–18th century) ===
In the 16th century, the feudal aristocracy increased its power, and the democratic power of the citizens weakened. The organization under the leadership of the Pope attempted to eliminate the new ideas and concepts since the Renaissance, restore the prestige and status of the church, and set off an anti-religious reform movement. Therefore, Baroque art was used by the pope. In the seventeenth century, there was some conflicts and fights existing between old Catholicism and Protestantism. The forces of old Catholicism used violence to suppress believers, and then actively used the artistic of Baroque to befog the minds of the believers and convince these believers. Baroque architecture style does not reject the sense of joy of heresy but was also faithful to the Christian worldview so-called "Christianized Renaissance”, which reflected the secular thought of pursuing freedom.

The Baroque style church is magnificent, which lead a very mystical surrounding. This was consistent with the spirit of the pope to show off its wealth and pursue the mystery. The decoration of the Baroque architecture style always attempts to lead human's ideals to the worship of Catholicism. Also, the Baroque architecture style was used by the court and the nobility. Hedonism takes up the most part it, and Catholicism subjects are also full of secular spirit. St. Peter's Basilica, completed in the 17th century, was just like a shell of the church. The interior and exterior decoration of St. Peter's Basilica started by Bernini in the 18th century. Large-scale ceiling murals, illusory paint-like illusory effects, a mixture of painting which combined sculpture, painting, and architectural to create an illusion effect on the stage.

The corridors of the Vatican and St. Peter's Basilica (1663–1666) to exaggerate the perspective effect through gradually narrowing, at the same time, with the lighting, leading the dramatic visual distance effect which reflects the architecture of Baroque style emphasizing on the sense of space and three-dimensionality of the buildings. Although the construction of Casina Pio IV started in the 16th century, its decoration is influenced by the Baroque style.

Under Pope Pius VI (1775–99), considerable changes were made in the part of the fountain against the wall, and a garden was constructed in the Casina. The Baroque architecture also emphasizes on the light which design and adopt the artificial light instead of natural light, leading a dramatic atmosphere. Architects and artists with sufficient funds used a large amount of gold, silver, and copper to embroider, decorated with various pilasters.

=== 19th Century ===
In the 19th century, there were no innovative architecture method and style. Architects continued to use architecture methods in the 18th century to construct some buildings such as the Braccio Nuovo.

=== 20th Century ===
In order to adapt to globalization and the development of religion and the administration of the Vatican City, there are some modern architecture were constructed during 20th century such as the government palace.

During the 20th century, the Vatican City began to restore some decades of buildings under the sponsorship of the rich. The renovation of St. Peter's Basilica was in 1981–1999 which includes scrubbing layers of grayish grime, bring colors to St. Peter's Basilica and repairing some parts of St. Peter's Basilica. The major contributor of the fund of restoration is the Knights of Columbus. The restoration of Sistine Chapel in the Vatican museum started in 1964 but discontinued in 1974 and began continuing the restoration work in 1980.

=== 21st Century ===
The Vatican City shut down the Vatican library in 2007 and re-opened in 2010. The restoration work of the Vatican library took three years and $11.5 million.

== Vatican City features with architecture in brief ==
The overall plane of Vatican City is an irregular quadrilateral. The main building, St. Peter's Church and the square occupy most of the southern section of the eastern half of the Vatican City. The Sistine Chapel in the northwest of St. Peter's Church is opposite to the Pope's glimpse hall in the west. The Belvedere Palace courtyard, the Vatican Museums, and the Central Post Office are main buildings in the eastern half of the city. The Vatican Gardens occupy most of the northeast of the Vatican City. From the overall layout of the Vatican City, it is different from the traditional “centralized” urban layout, which is represented in Florence under the Renaissance and also different from the balanced layout of modern cities. The obvious characteristics of the Vatican City are the division and opposition of east and west which represented by the eastern half of the city centered on St. Peter's Basilica and the Sistine Chapel and the western half of the city dominated by the Vatican Gardens. This meaning the area of affairs and religious and the area of people’s living has been separated. The separation of the religious area and living area reflects that neither citizen relies solely on God for penance and superstition, nor simply indulge in the world and give up the use of religious guidance and persuasion. The separation of the religious and the living area also represents that the religious life of God and the real life of human beings coexist in the Vatican City, but it is distinct in space.

== Different periods of distribution of buildings in the Vatican City ==
According to the Vatican's territory, there are few architectures constructed in the ancient period. Most of the architecture started construction in the ancient period, which is the predecessor of architecture existing in the 16th-18th century. The architectures of the Middle Ages are mainly located in the southeastern part of the Vatican such as St. Peter's Basilica. The architectures in the 16th century are in the middle of St. Peter's Church and the north of Belvedere Palace courtyard. The architectures such as St. Peter's Square in the 17th century are mainly in the southeast of the Vatican City. The buildings from the 18th-19th century were constructions surrounded by the church, including guard camps and offices which distributed scattered. The new buildings such as post offices, banks, and the reception of the pope in the 20th century mainly in the northeast, and southwest of the Vatican City.

== The pavilion of the Vatican in Paris in 1937 ==
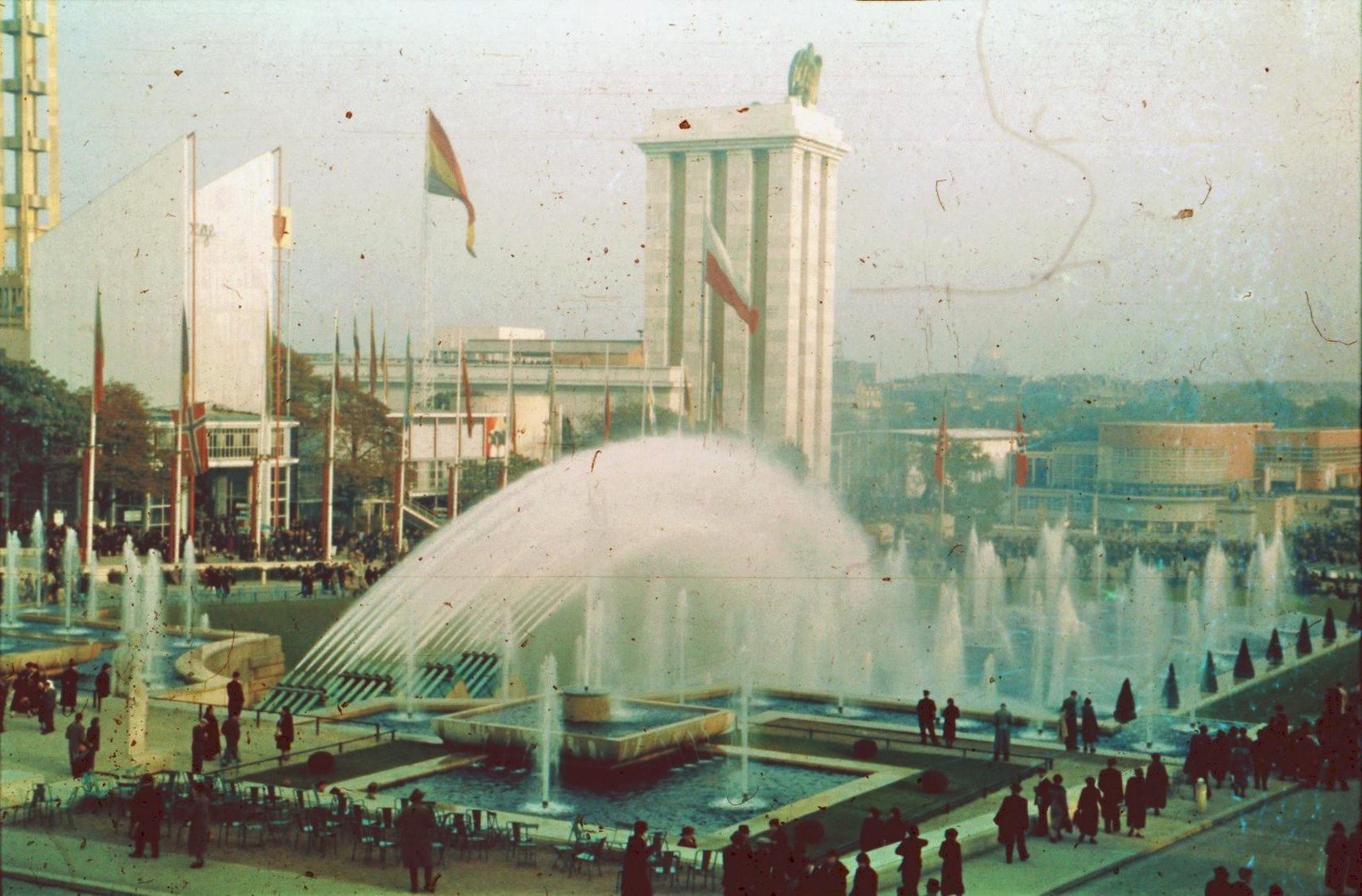
The Pontifical Catholic Pavilion at the Exposition Internationale des Arts et Techniques dans la Vie Moderne in Paris in 1937 (Agfacolor photo). The pavilion is on the far left, its golden bell tower topped with a statue of the Virgin Mary (not visible) at the top. The Nazi Germany pavilion is in the center.

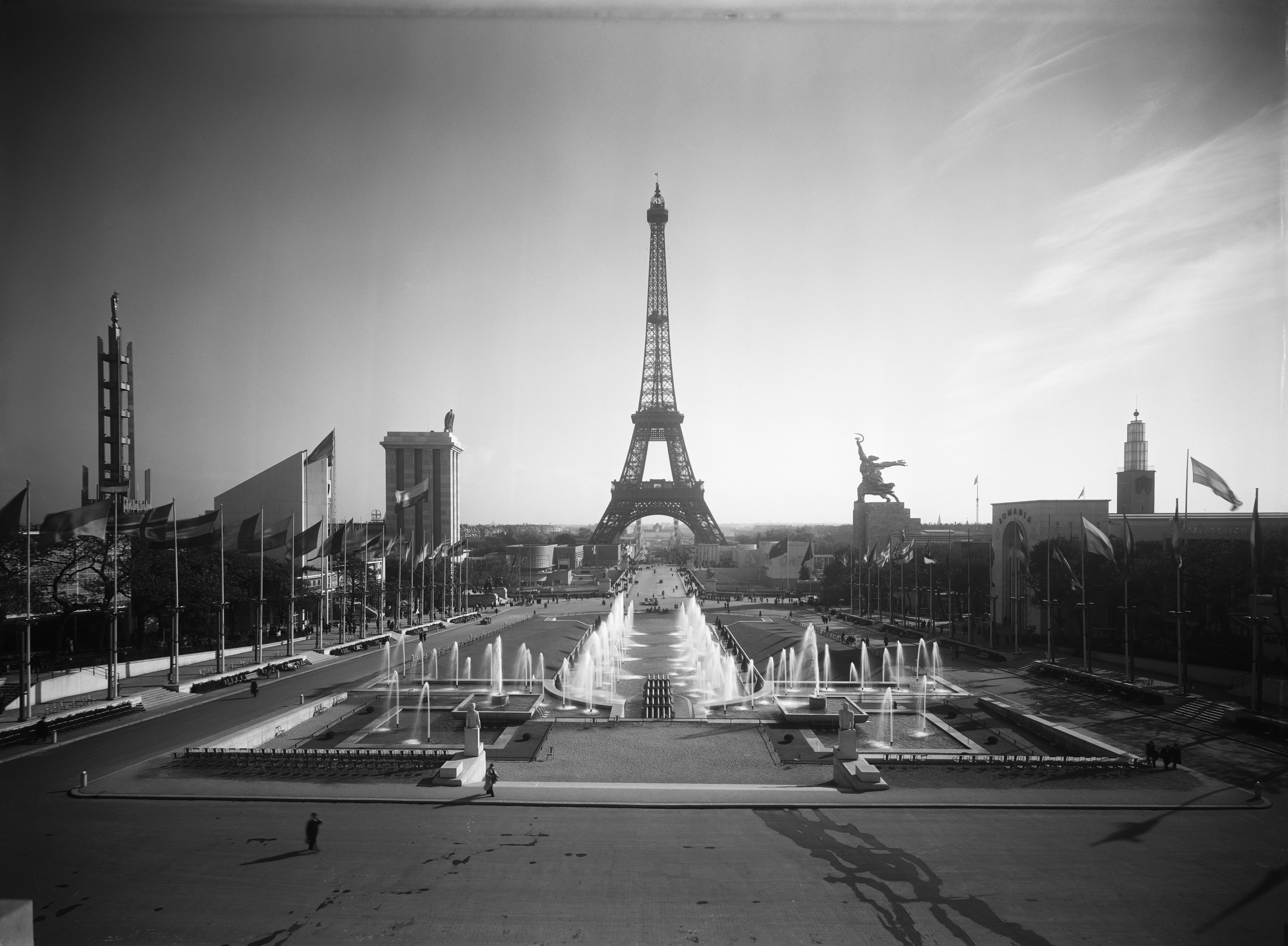
A fuller view of the Vatican pavilion

== See also ==
- Index of Vatican City-related articles
