= Languages of Vatican City =

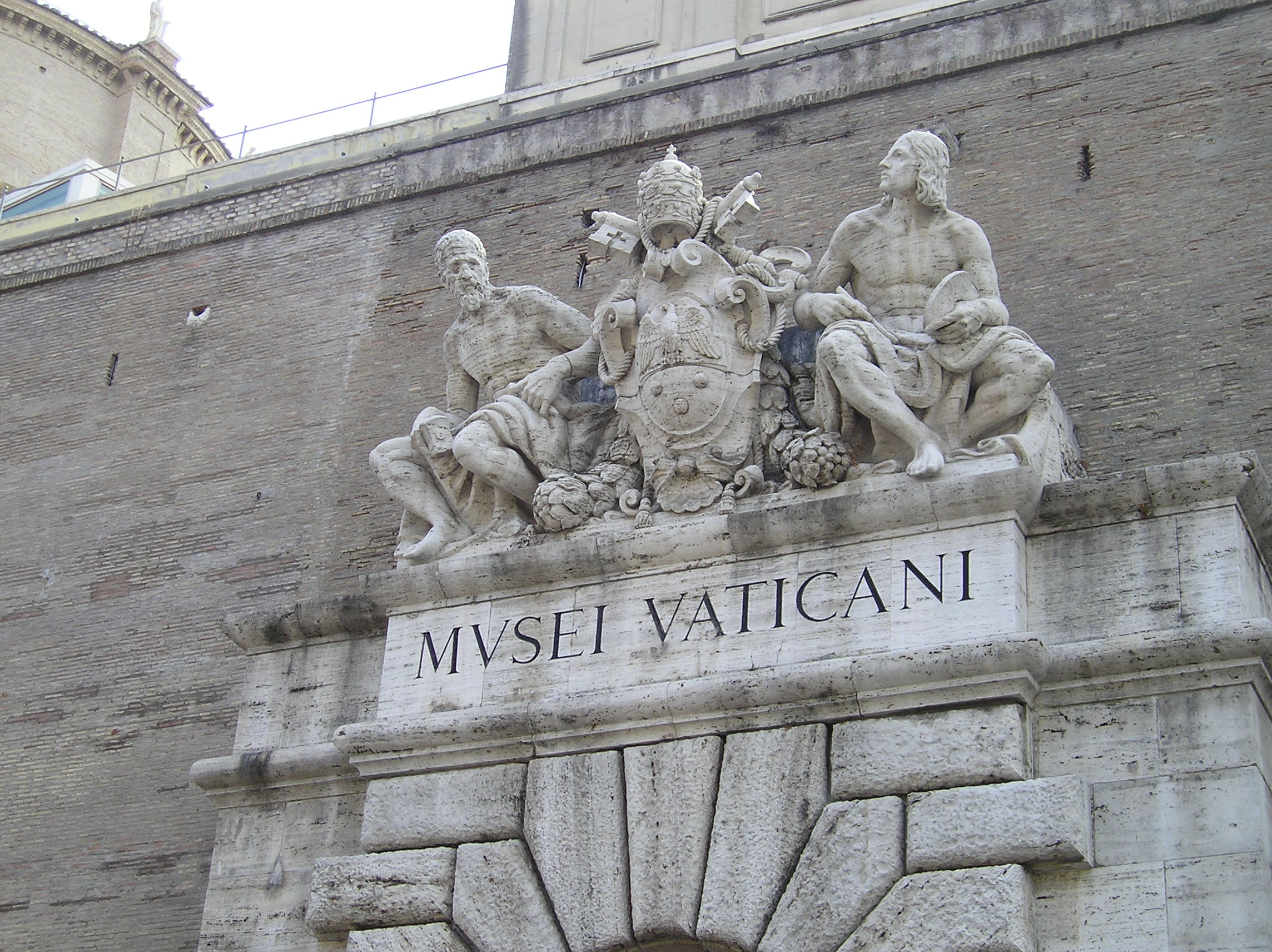
- Inscription in Italian over the entrance to the Vatican Museums
- Official: Italian, Latin

Vatican City uses Italian in its official documents and as its main working language. However, many other languages are also used by institutions situated within the state, such as the Holy See and the Swiss Guard, as well as personally by its diverse population.

== History ==
During the Roman Empire, Latin was the language spoken in the area corresponding to the present Vatican City. The subsequent Papal States also used Latin for official purposes during the first centuries of their existence. In 1870, the area became part of the Kingdom of Italy, whose official language was Italian.

In 1929, the Lateran Treaty established Vatican City as an independent state. The Fundamental Law of Vatican City State does not establish an official language, but its laws are published in Italian in a supplement to the Acta Apostolicae Sedis (the official gazette of the Holy See), which is mainly in Latin.

Since the state came into existence in 1929, most of the buildings situated within it predated it by centuries. Inscriptions can be found in them mainly in Latin, but also in Italian, Greek, French, and even German.

== Present languages ==
Many languages are spoken within the state, as its inhabitants come from many countries. Italian is the lingua franca of the Vatican and replaced Latin as the official language of the Synod of Bishops in 2014. The Holy See, the entity with authority over the state (yet legally distinct), uses Latin as its official language and Italian as its main working language in administrative and diplomatic affairs. French is also sometimes used as a diplomatic language. In the Swiss Guard, Swiss German is the language used for giving commands, but the individual guards take their oath of loyalty in their own languages: German, French, Italian or Romansh.

Since the state was established, the native languages of the popes have been Italian, Polish, German, Spanish, and English.

== Websites ==
The official website of Vatican City is in Italian. Previous versions of the website were also available in English, French, German and Spanish.

The official website of the Holy See is primarily in Italian, with versions in English, French, German, Portuguese and Spanish, and partial versions in Arabic, Chinese and Latin. Some content is also available in many other languages, such as Albanian, Belarusian, Croatian, Czech, Dutch, Hebrew, Hungarian, Indonesian, Japanese, Korean, Lithuanian, Maltese, Polish, Russian, Slovak, Slovene, Swahili and Ukrainian.

The Holy See's newspaper L'Osservatore Romano is published in Italian, English, French, German, Polish, Portuguese and Spanish. The Vatican News website is available in many languages: Albanian, Amharic, Arabic, Armenian, Belarusian, Bulgarian, Chinese, Croatian, Czech, English, Esperanto, French, German, Italian, Japanese, Korean, Latvian, Lithuanian, Hindi, Hungarian, Kannada, Malayalam, Macedonian, Polish, Portuguese, Romanian, Russian, Slovak, Slovene, Spanish, Swahili, Swedish, Tamil, Tigrinya, Ukrainian, and Vietnamese.

== See also ==
- Index of Vatican City-related articles
- Ecclesiastical Latin, the form of Latin used by the Church in its documents.
- Living Latin
- Romanesco, the vernacular spoken in Rome around the Vatican City.
