= Vatican during the Savoyard era (1870–1929) =

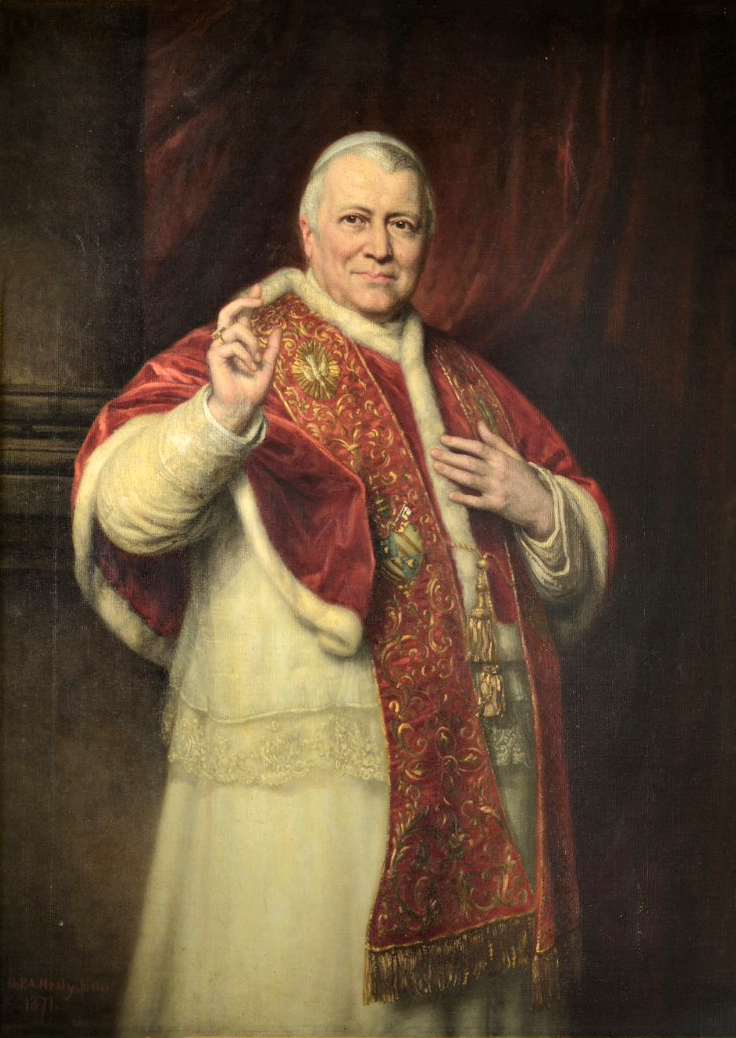
Pope Pius IX (1846–1878), under whose rule the Papal States passed into secular control.

Vatican during the Savoyard era describes the relation of the Vatican to Italy, after 1870, which marked the end of the Papal States, and before 1929, when the papacy regained autonomy in the Lateran Treaty, a period dominated by the Roman question.

== Background ==
In the years that followed the revolutions of 1848, Italian nationalists – both those who wished to unify the country under the Kingdom of Sardinia and its ruling House of Savoy and those who favored a republican solution – saw the Papal States as the chief obstacle to Italian unity. Louis Napoleon, who had now seized control of France as Emperor Napoleon III, tried to play a double game, simultaneously forming an alliance with Sardinia and playing on his famous uncle's nationalist credentials on the one hand and maintaining French troops in Rome to protect the Pope's rights on the other.

After the Austro-Sardinian War of 1859, much of northern Italy was unified under the House of Savoy's government; in the aftermath, Garibaldi led a revolution that overthrew the Bourbon monarchy in the Kingdom of the Two Sicilies. Afraid that Garibaldi would set up a republican government in the south, the Sardinians petitioned Napoleon for permission to send troops through the Papal States to gain control of the Two Sicilies, which was granted on the condition that Rome was left undisturbed. In 1860, with much of the region already in rebellion against Papal rule, Sardinia conquered the eastern two-thirds of the Papal States and cemented its hold on the south. Bologna, Ferrara, Umbria, the Marches, Benevento and Pontecorvo were all formally annexed by November of the same year, and a unified Kingdom of Italy was declared. The Papal States were reduced to Latium, the immediate neighborhood of Rome.

Rome was declared Capital of Italy in March 1861, when the first Italian Parliament met in the kingdom's old capital Turin in Piemonte. However, the Italian government could not take possession of its capital because Napoleon III kept a French garrison in Rome protecting Pope Pius IX. The opportunity to eliminate the last vestige of the Papal States came when the Franco-Prussian War began in July 1870. Emperor Napoleon III had to recall his garrison from Rome for France's own defence and could no longer protect the pope. Following the collapse of the Second French Empire at the battle of Sedan, widespread public demonstrations demanded that the Italian government take Rome. King Victor Emmanuel II sent Count Gustavo Ponza di San Martino to Pius IX with a personal letter offering a face-saving proposal that would have allowed the peaceful entry of the Italian Army into Rome, under the guise of offering protection to the pope.

== End of the Papal States ==
According to Raffaele De Cesare:

The Pope's reception of San Martino [10 September 1870] was unfriendly. Pius IX. allowed violent outbursts to escape him. Throwing the King's letter upon a table, he exclaimed, "Fine loyalty! You are all a set of vipers, of whited sepulchres, and wanting in faith." He was perhaps alluding to other letters received from the King. After, growing calmer, he exclaimed: "I am no prophet, nor son of a prophet, but I tell you, you will never enter Rome!" San Martino was so mortified that he left the next day.

On 10 September, Italy declared war on the Papal States, and the Italian Army, commanded by General Raffaele Cadorna, crossed the papal frontier on 11 September and advanced slowly toward Rome, hoping that a peaceful entry could be negotiated. The Italian Army reached the Aurelian Walls on 19 September and placed Rome under a state of siege. Although the pope's tiny army was incapable of defending the city, Pius IX ordered it to put up at least a token resistance to emphasize that Italy was acquiring Rome by force and not consent. On 20 September, the Bersaglieri entered Rome and marched down Via Pia, which was subsequently renamed Via XX Settembre. Rome and Latium were annexed to the Kingdom of Italy after a plebiscite.

In Chapter XXXIV, De Cesare also made the following observations:

- "The Roman question was the stone tied to Napoleon's feet—that dragged him into the abyss. He never forgot, even in August, 1870, a month before Sedan, that he was sovereign of a Catholic country, that he had been made Emperor, and was supported by the votes of the Conservatives and the influence of the clergy; and that it was his supreme duty not to abandon the Pontiff."
- "For twenty years Napoleon III. had been the true sovereign of Rome, where he had many friends and relations... Without him the temporal power would never have been reconstituted, nor, being reconstituted, would have endured."

This event, described in Italian history books as a liberation, was taken very bitterly by the Pope. The Italian government had offered to allow the Pope to retain control of the Leonine City on the west bank of the Tiber, but Pius rejected the overture. Early the following year, the capital of Italy was moved from Florence to Rome. The Pope, whose previous residence, the Quirinal Palace, had become the royal palace of the Kings of Italy, withdrew in protest into the Vatican, where he lived as a self-proclaimed "prisoner", refusing to leave or to set foot in St. Peter's Square, and forbidding (Non Expedit) Catholics under pain of excommunication to participate in elections in the new Italian state.

In October, a plebiscite in Rome and the surrounding Campagna resulted in a vote for union with the Kingdom of Italy. Pius IX refused to accept this act of force majeure. He remained in his palace, describing himself as a prisoner in the Vatican. However, the new Italian control of Rome did not wither, nor did the Catholic world come to the Pope's aid as Pius IX had expected.

The provisional capital of Italy had been Florence since 1865. In 1871, the Italian government moved to the banks of the Tiber. Victor Emmanuel installed himself in the Quirinal Palace. Rome became once again, for the first time in thirteen centuries, the capital city of a united Italy.

Rome was unusual among capital cities only in that it contained the power of the Pope and a small parcel of land (Vatican City) beyond national control. This anomaly was not formally resolved until the Lateran pacts of 1929.

== Last years of Pius IX ==
Pope Pius spent the last eight years of his long pontificate – the longest in Church history – as prisoner of the Vatican. Catholics were forbidden to vote or be voted in national elections. However, they were permitted to participate in local elections, where they achieved successes. Pius himself was active during those years, by creating new diocesan seats and appointing bishops to numerous dioceses which had been unoccupied for years. Asked if he wanted his successor to follow his Italian policies, the old pontiff replied:

My successor may be inspired by my love to the Church and my wish, to do the right thing. Everything changed around me. My system and my policies had their time; I am too old to change direction. This will be the task of my successor.

== Pope Leo XIII ==
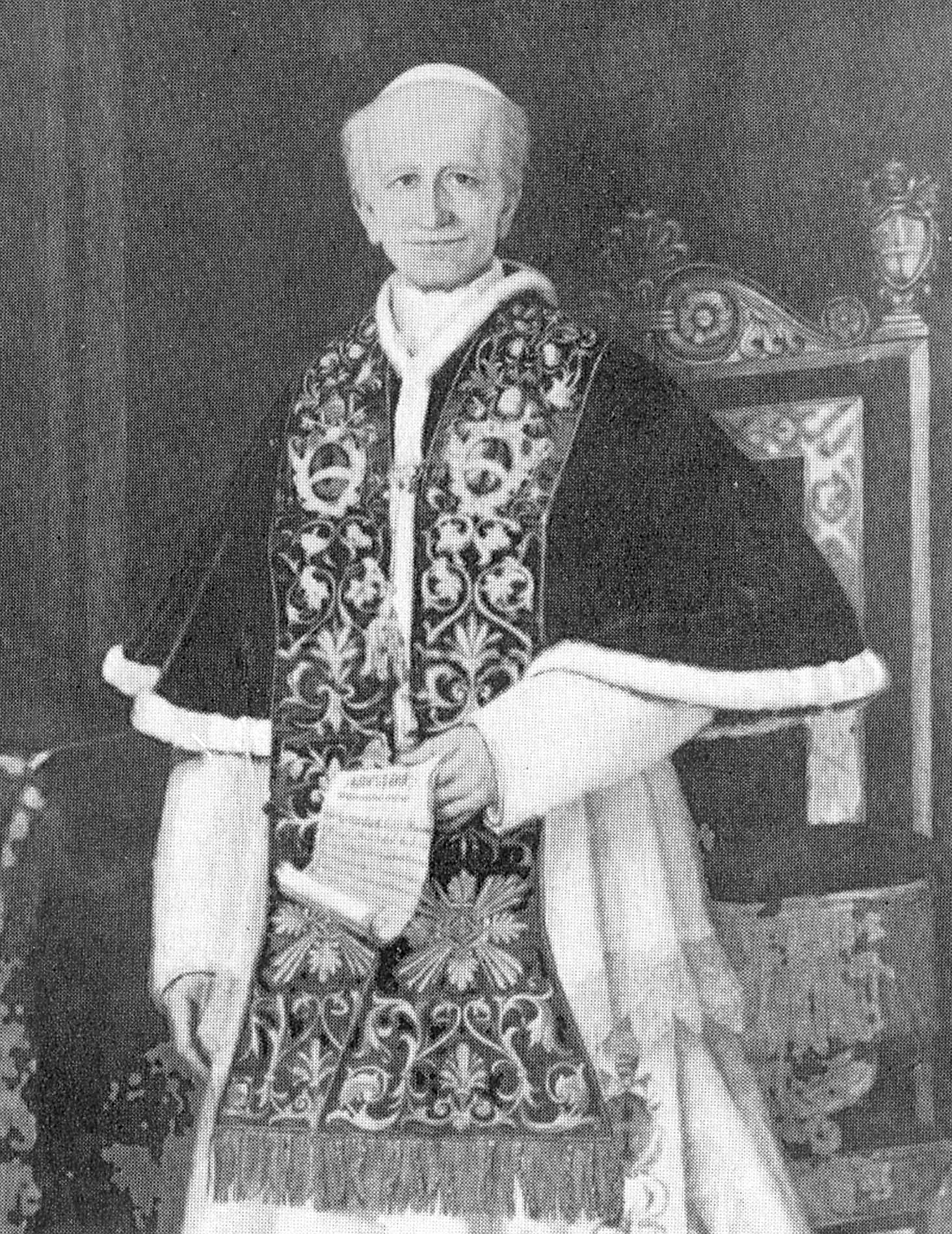
In 1882, Pope Leo XIII wrote to the Austrian emperor Franz Josef I to move the papacy to Salzburg or Trieste.

Pope Leo XIII, considered a great diplomat, managed to improve relations with Russia, Prussia, Germany, France, England and other countries. However, in light of a hostile anti-Catholic climate in Italy, he continued the policies of Pius IX towards Italy, without major modifications. He had to defend the freedom of the Church against Italian persecutions and attacks in the area of education, expropriation and violation of Catholic churches, legal measures against the Church and brutal attacks, culminating in anticlerical groups attempting to throw the body of the deceased Pope Pius IX into the Tiber river on 13 July 1881. The Pope even considered moving the papacy to Spain, Malta or to Trieste or Salzburg, two cities in Austria, an idea which the Austrian monarch Franz Josef I gently rejected.

== Recovery of papal prestige ==
Paradoxically, the eclipse of papal temporal power during the 19th century was accompanied by a recovery of papal prestige. The monarchist reaction in the wake of the French Revolution and the later emergence of constitutional governments served alike, though in different ways, to sponsor that development. The reinstated monarchs of Catholic Europe saw in the papacy a conservative ally rather than a jurisdictional rival. Later, when the institution of constitutional governments broke the ties binding the clergy to the policies of royal regimes, Catholics were freed to respond to the renewed spiritual authority of the pope.

The popes of the 19th and 20th centuries exercised their spiritual authority with increasing vigor and in every aspect of religious life. By the crucial pontificate of Pope Pius IX (1846–1878), for example, papal control over worldwide Catholic missionary activity was firmly established for the first time in history.

== See also ==
- Index of Vatican City-related articles
