= Vatican Radio lawsuit =

The Vatican Radio lawsuit was started by the Regional Health Department for "Throwing of dangerous things" on the Italian ground at their antenna site.

The Santa Maria di Galeria transmitter site is the subject of a dispute between the station and some local residents who claim the non-ionising radiation from the site has affected their health. However these claims are not accepted by the station. The only peer reviewed study of these statistics did find a statistically higher incidence of leukemia within 6km (4 miles) of the transmitter site, but stated that no causal implication can be drawn due to the small sample size. The paper discusses several similar findings around the world, with similar conclusions. Effects are reported to be more significant in the case of Childhood Leukemia. With one exception in 2005, where a 10 day suspended sentence was eventually overturned on appeal, every time it has been sued, the station cited the Lateran Treaty, bilateral agreements signed by the Holy See and Benito Mussolini which exempt it from Italian law. (The area around the antennas at the time it was built was not heavily populated.)

Vatican Radio covers an area of Rome, as set by the "extraterritorial right" in Italian law. Within this area, some of the station's pylons are higher than 100 meters (330 feet). These transmitters have been in place since 1957. Since this part of Rome is not under Italian jurisdiction, these transmitters are not subject to the Italian laws that limit the radiation that a radio station can emit. In the vicinity of these pylons, the radiation emitted can be more than the double the amount allowed by Italian law, as verified officially by the Italian Civil Defense and the Department for the Environment of the region of Lazio.

Residents who have moved to the area near the transmitters have experienced other disturbances relating to the station, as is common near transmitter sites the world over. The most common complaints are that one can hear the transmissions breaking through on telephones, and other electronic devices (due in many cases to the devices having poor electromagnetic immunity to the strong signals). A press report in the Region of Lazio has also reported that the people in the area around the transmitters are more likely to have leukemia; the closer those in the examined sample lived to the radio station, the more likely they were to have leukemia, up to six times the Italian national average. This report may have resulted from a press release of a report submitted for peer review in 2001. The press report was not itself peer reviewed.

Dramatizing the study, a well known Italian TV program called Le Iene went to the radio station and replaced the radio's insignia with a new one stating "Radio Erode" meaning 'Herod's Radio', referring to Herod the Great and the Massacre of the Innocents, since the study showed that the most affected people are children 0 to 14 years old.

== See also ==
- Index of Vatican City-related articles
- Vatican Radio
