= Italy-Vatican City border =

International border between Italy and Vatican City

Italy–Vatican City border
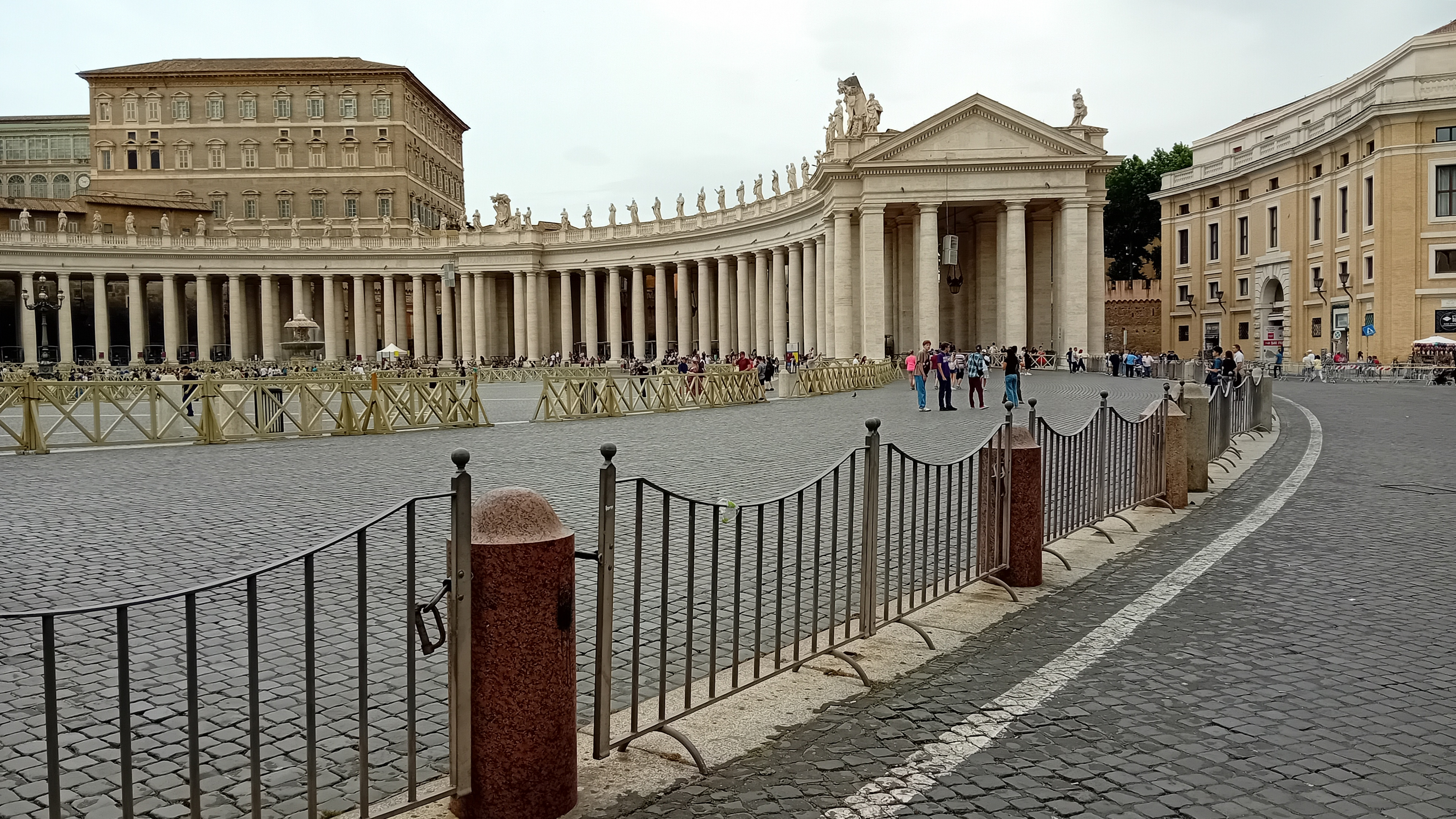
- St. Peter's Square in Vatican City is distinguished from the territory of Italy only by a white line along the limit of the square, where it touches Piazza Pio XII.

Characteristics
- Entities: Italy Vatican City
- Length: 3.2 km (2 mi)
- Enclave and exclaves: Vatican City State in its entirety is an enclave within the city of Rome, Italy.

History
- Established: 11 February 1929; Lateran Treaty

The Italy-Vatican City border is 3.2 km (2 mi) long. It surrounds Vatican City a mostly walled enclave within the city of Rome, Italy. The border is defined by Article 3 of the Lateran Treaty between the Kingdom of Italy under King Victor Emmanuel III and Prime Minister Benito Mussolini and the Holy See under Pope Pius XI and Cardinal Secretary of State Pietro Gasparri to settle the long-standing Roman question.

== Features ==
The Italy-Vatican City border features the historic Leonine Walls, built by order of Pope Leo IV in the 9th century. The border is also easy to cross in two places:

- St. Peter's Square in Vatican City and Piazza Pio XII in Rome, Italy, are distinguished only by a white line along the border.
- The Paul VI Audience Hall lies partially in the Vatican City but mostly in Italy; the Italian part of the building is treated as an extraterritorial area of the Holy See.
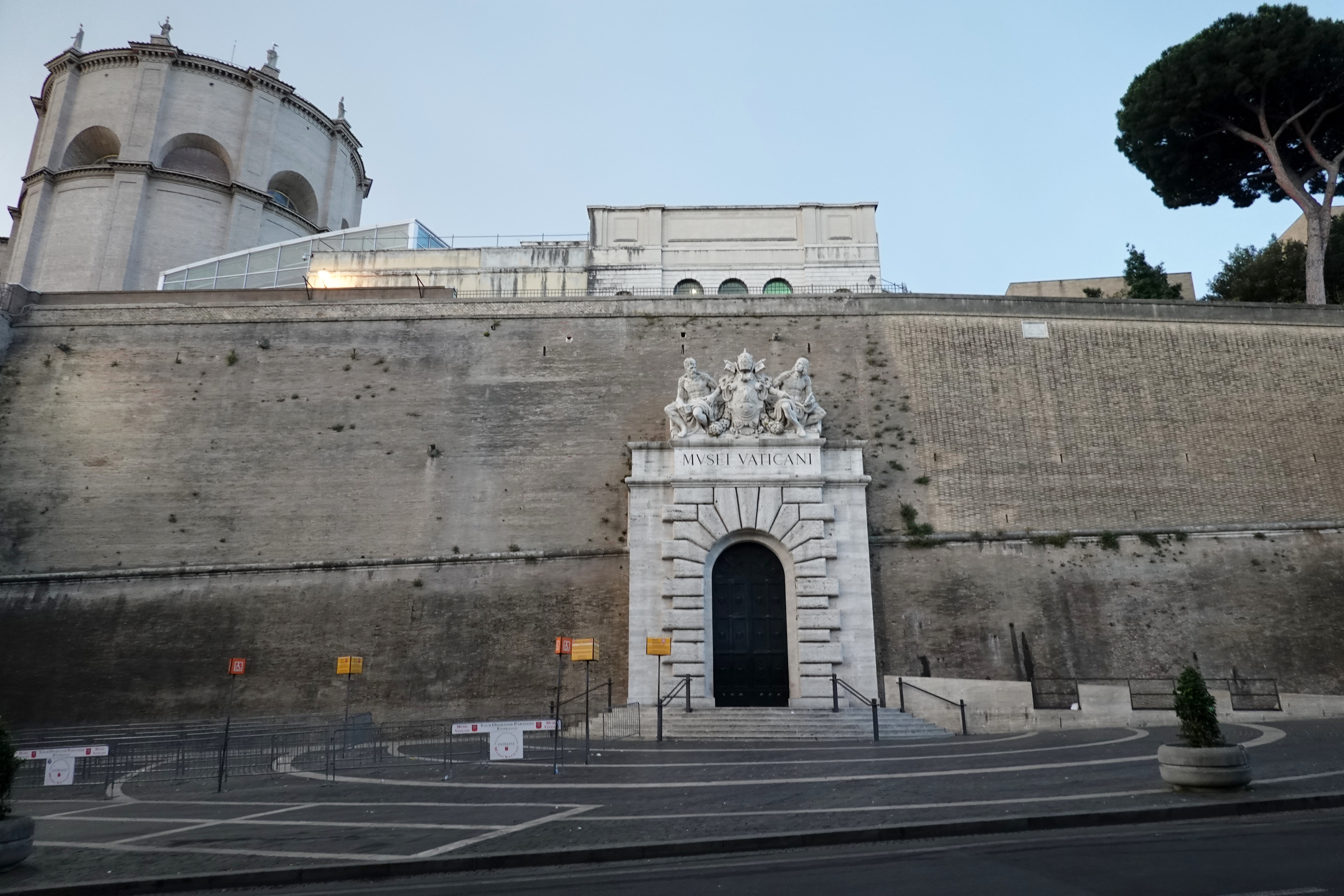
The Vatican Museums entrance and exit are on the border.

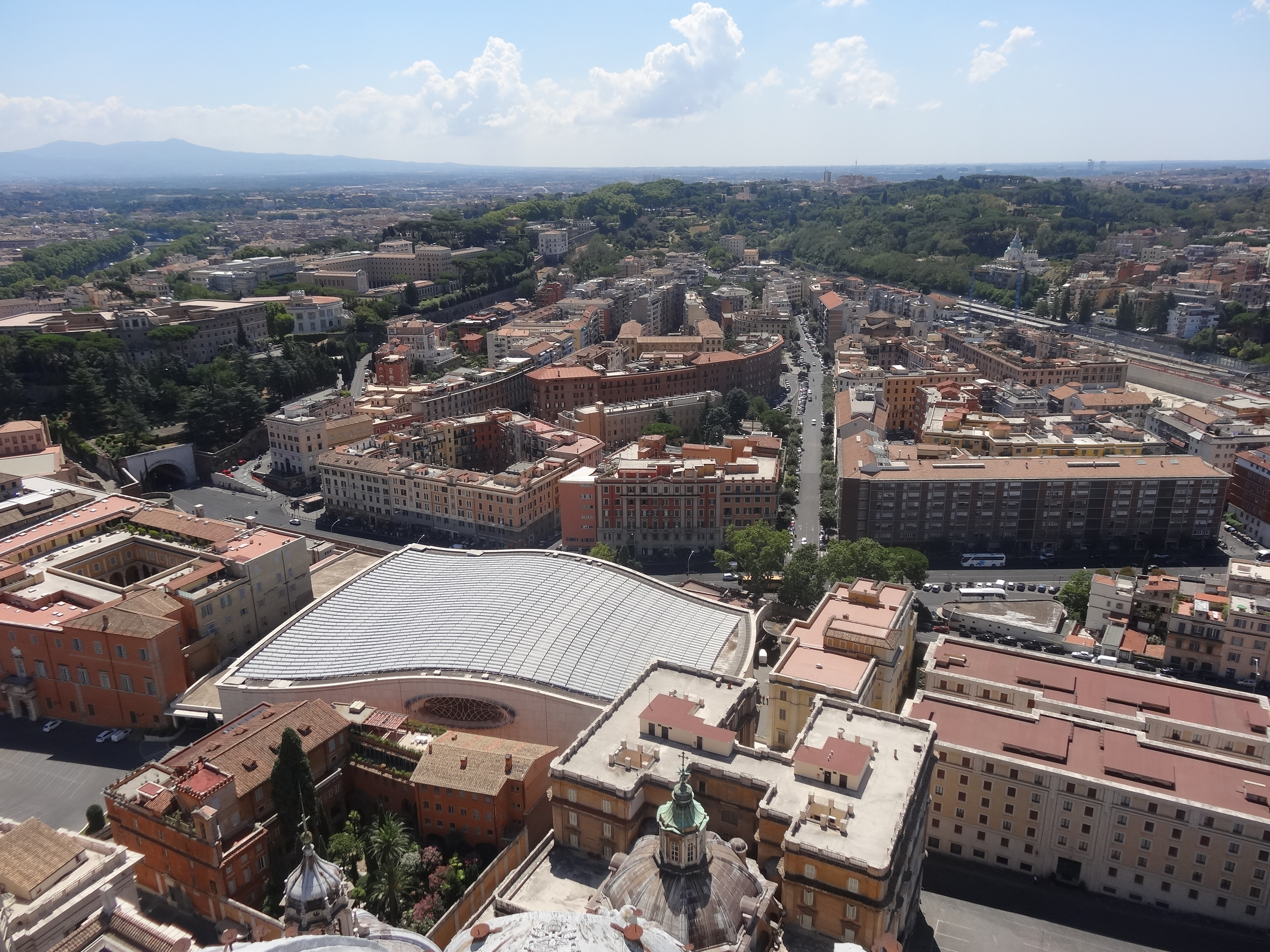
The Paul VI Audience Hall, straddles the border.

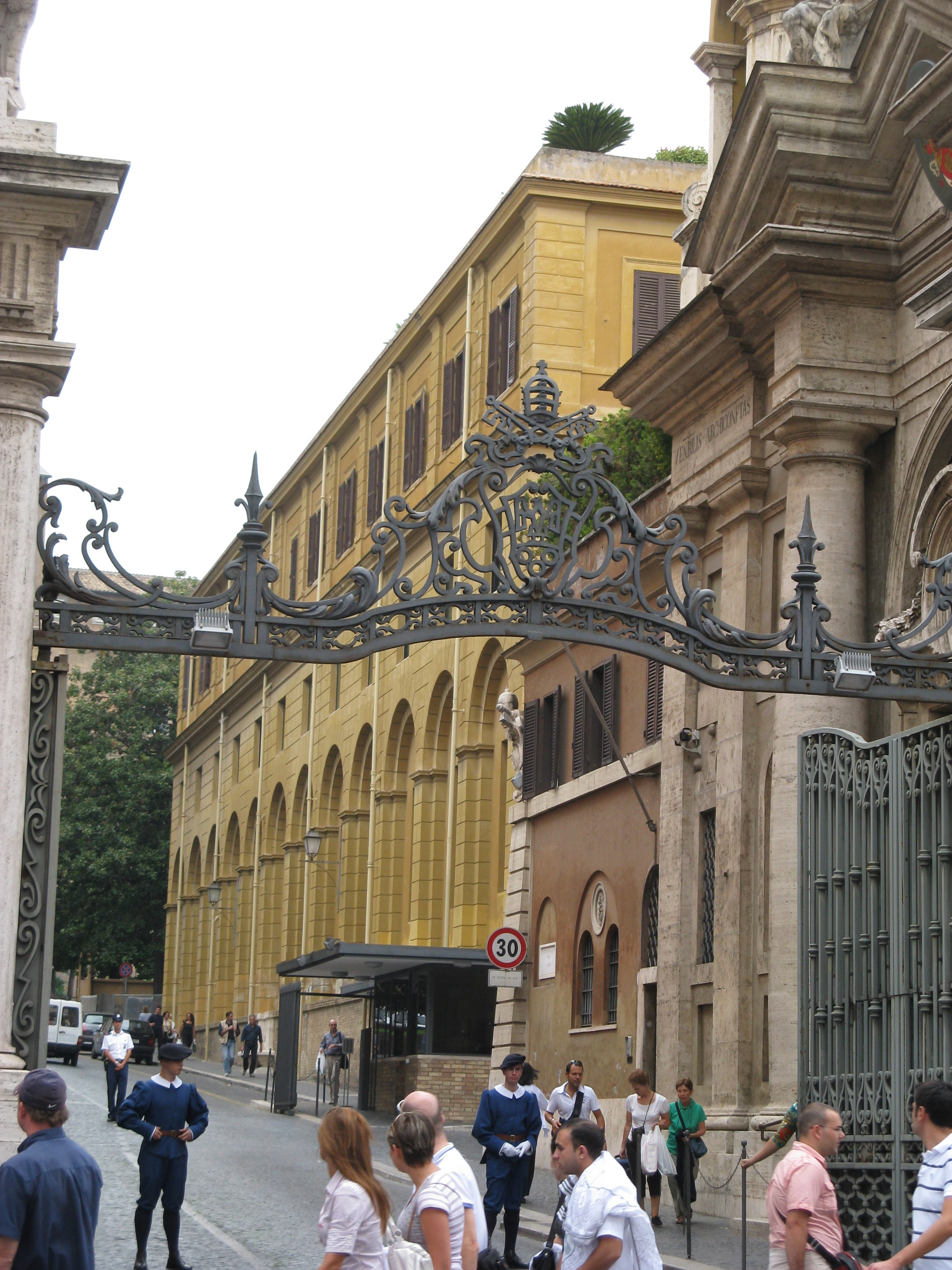
Porta Sant'Anna is a gated entrance on the border.

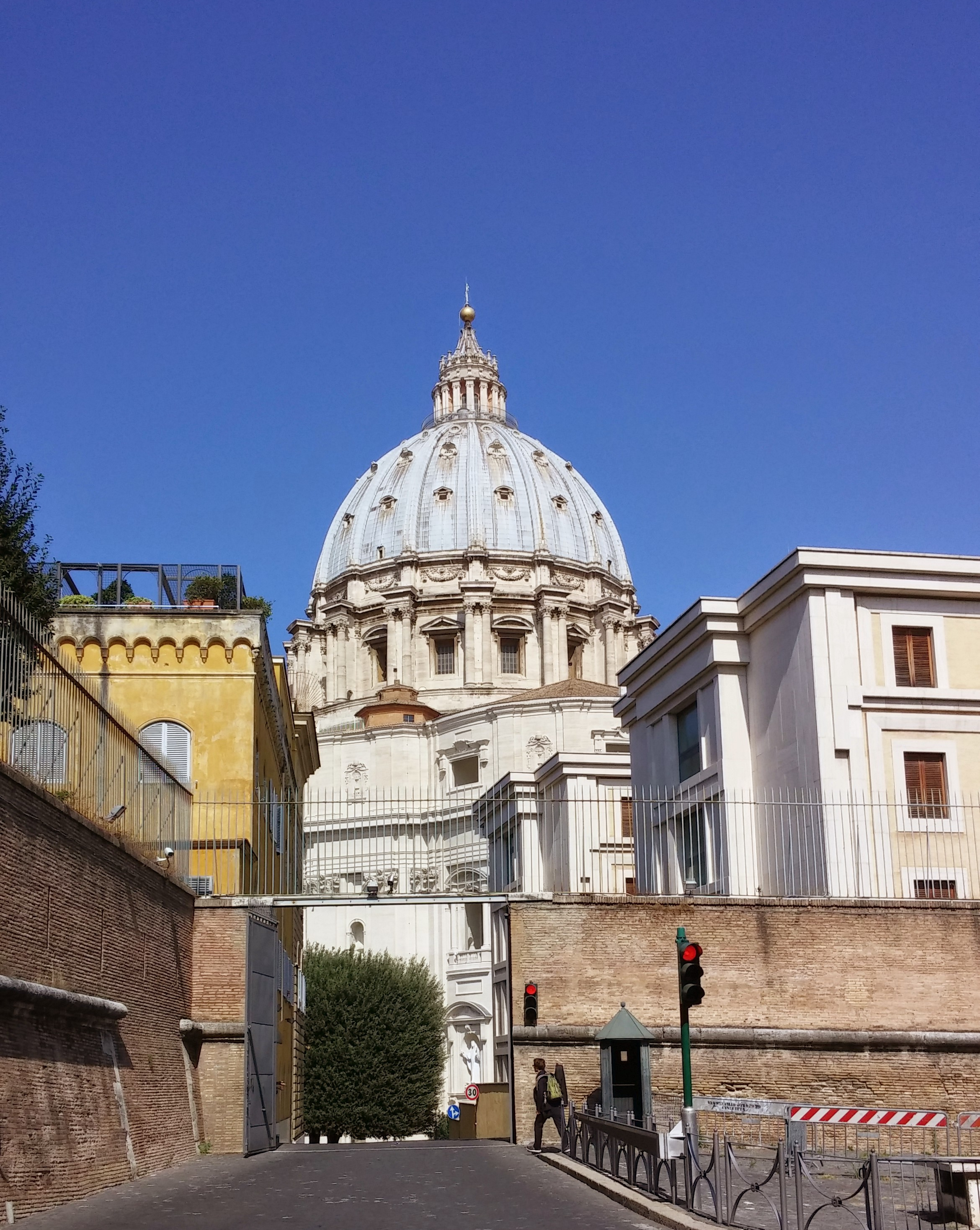
Porta del Perugino is a gated entrance on the border.

== Border crossings ==
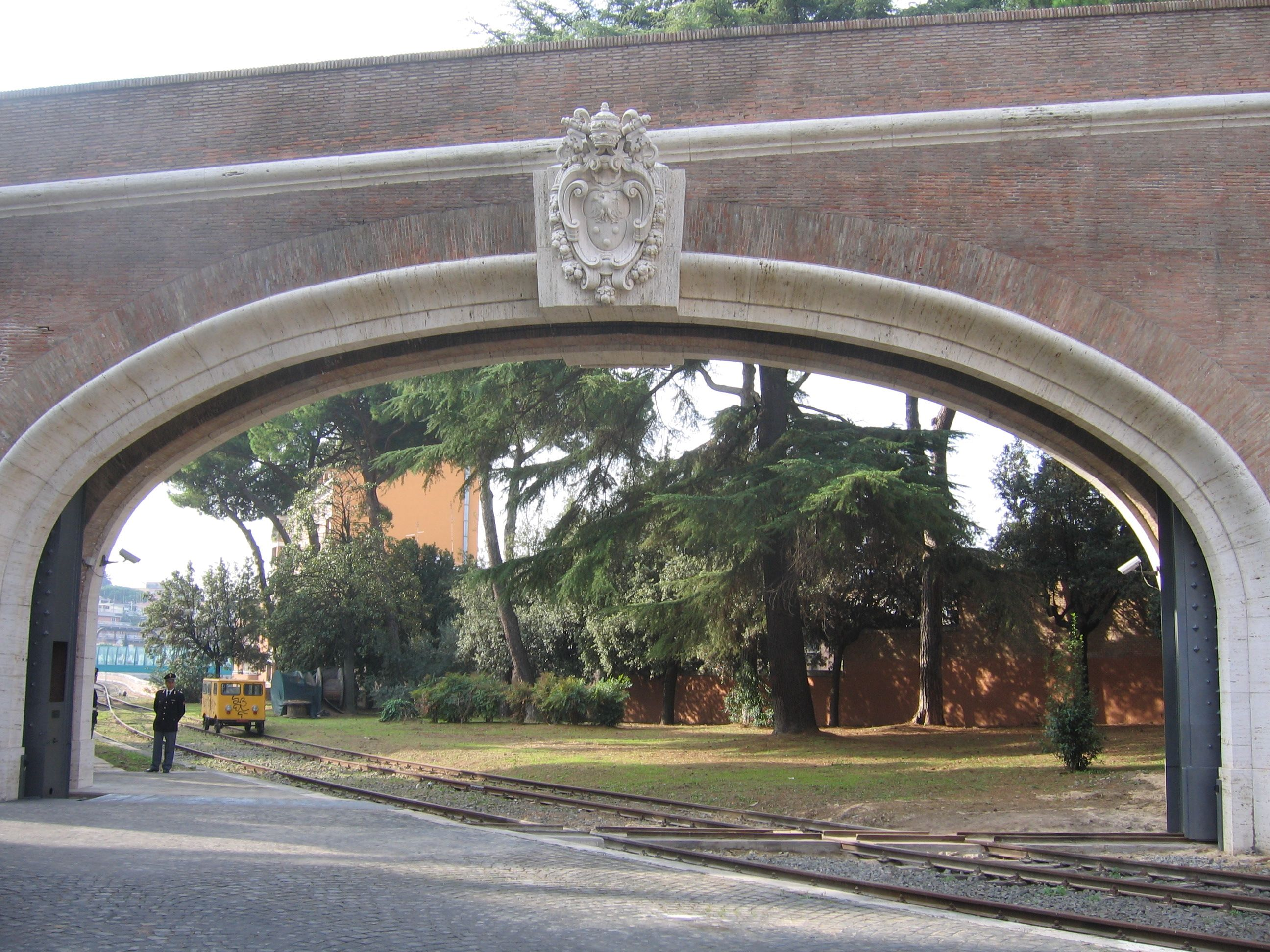
The Vatican Railway exiting Vatican City into Italy.

=== Pedestrian ===
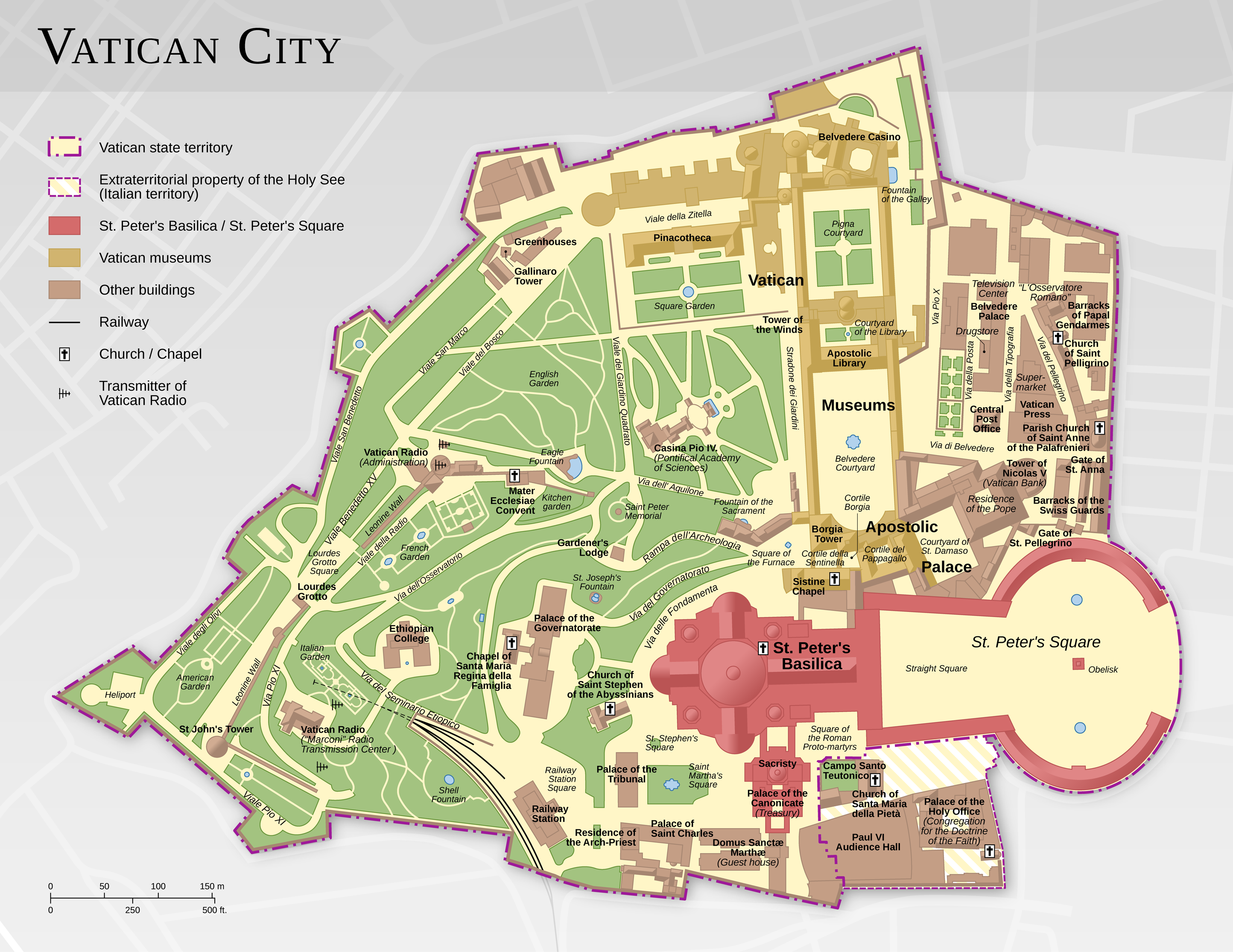
Map of Vatican City showing the Italy-Vatican City border as well as the extraterritorial area that most of the Paul VI Audience Hall is located in.

The on-foot crossings between the two countries from north to south are:

- Vatican Museums Entrance
- Vatican Museums Exit
- Porta Sant'Anna Pedestrian Gate
- Door (Via di Porta Angelica, 28)
- St. Peter's Square Entrance/Exit
- Teutonic Cemetery Gate
- Porta Pertusa (currently walled up)
- Inside the Paul VI Audience Hall (lies partially in Vatican City but mostly in Italy)

=== Road ===
The paved road crossings between the two countries from north to south are:

- Porta di Santa Rosa
- Porta Sant'Anna
- Via della Sacrestia
- Unnamed Road
- Porta del Perugino

=== Rail ===
The following railway lines and services cross the border:

- Vatican Railway

== Public points of entry ==
Border crossings currently open to the general public with no passport required. Passing through Security is required to access the Vatican Museums, St. Peter's Basilica, and Papal Audiences/Events.

=== From Italy to Vatican City ===
- Vatican Museums Entrance
- St. Peter's Square Entrance/Exit
- Inside the Paul VI Audience Hall

=== From Vatican City to Italy ===
- Vatican Museums Exit
- St. Peter's Square Entrance/Exit
- Inside the Paul VI Audience Hall

== History ==
The border between the two countries dates back to when the Vatican was established as an independent state through the Lateran Treaty between the Holy See and the Kingdom of Italy in 1929. When the Lateran Treaty of 1929 that gave the state its form was being prepared, the boundaries of the proposed territory were influenced by the fact that much of it was all but enclosed by this loop. For some tracts of the frontier, there was no wall, but the line of certain buildings supplied part of the boundary, and for a small part of the frontier a modern wall was constructed. The territory includes St. Peter's Square, distinguished from the territory of Italy only by a white line along the limit of the square, where it touches Piazza Pio XII.

== See also ==
- Italian Peninsula
- The Lateran Treaty
- Holy See–Italy relations
- Extraterritorial Properties of the Holy See
- Index of Vatican City-related articles
