= Homelessness in Vatican City =

Homelessness in Vatican City is a social issue, with the people coming predominantly from the surrounding Italian city of Rome. Several facilities have been established by the papacy as a means to provide housing and food to the homeless.

== Background ==
Vatican City is a small city-state located within the confines of the Italian capital city of Rome. Rome is estimated to have about 8,000 homeless people, mostly Italians, and they mostly engage in begging for living on the streets. Homeless people often reside on the streets around St. Peter's Basilica. Issues from the homeless include policing and security of the visitors from any untoward incidents, and sanitization of the spaces around Vatican due to open defecation and urination by the homeless.

== Facilities ==
Since 2013, sleeping bags and tents have been provided for the homeless in the Vatican City. In 2015, a shelter was established just outside the Vatican walls and was opened by Pope Francis. The shelter is called "Gift of Mercy" ("Dono di Misericordia"). Pope Francis also organized for showers to be built in the public restrooms, and provide laundry services. In November 2019, he converted Palazzo Migliori, a luxurious 19th-century building donated by the Migliori family, into a shelter for homeless people. The office of the Papal charities also oversees haircuts, and cleaning services by volunteers for the homeless.

== Other activities ==
In June 2015, the Vatican invited homeless people to view the Shroud of Turin, a cloth believed to have been wrapped around Jesus after his crucifixion. The Papacy has also invited homeless people for visits to the Sistine Chapel and other museums in the premises. In 2015, the Pope allowed a deceased homeless local to be buried in the Vatican.

The World Day of the Poor was established by Pope Francis in 2016, and involves a feast hosted by the Pope for the homeless people in the Paul VI Hall in the Vatican. The Vatican also sends food packages to homeless people in Rome, along with a prayer message from the Pope. During the COVID-19 pandemic, the Vatican organized for mass vaccination of the homeless.

== See also ==
- Index of Vatican City–related articles
