= Anima Mundi, Vatican City =

Art and sculpture museums in Vatican City

Anima Mundi
- Anima Mundi
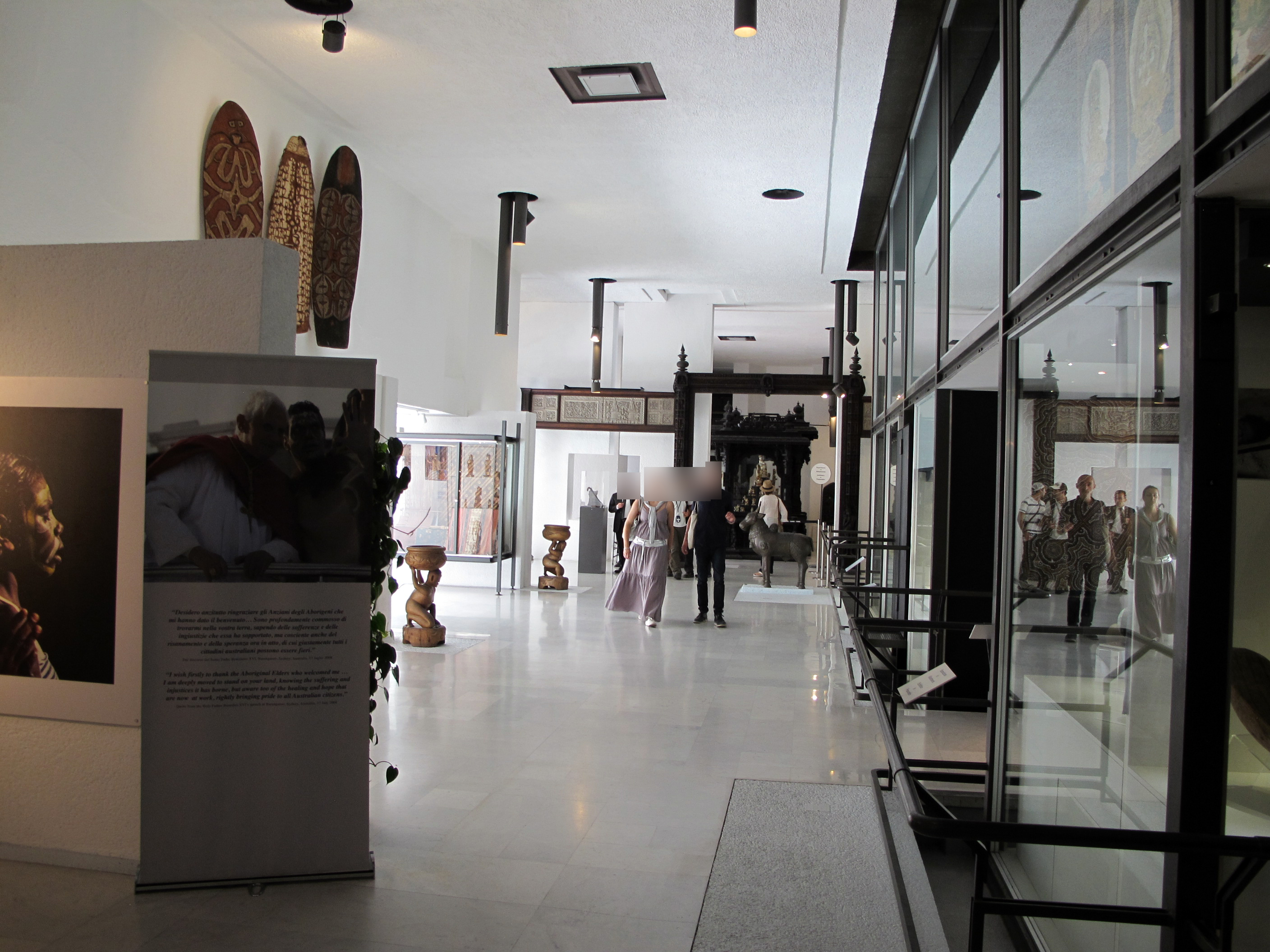
- The galleries of Anima Mundi in 2014

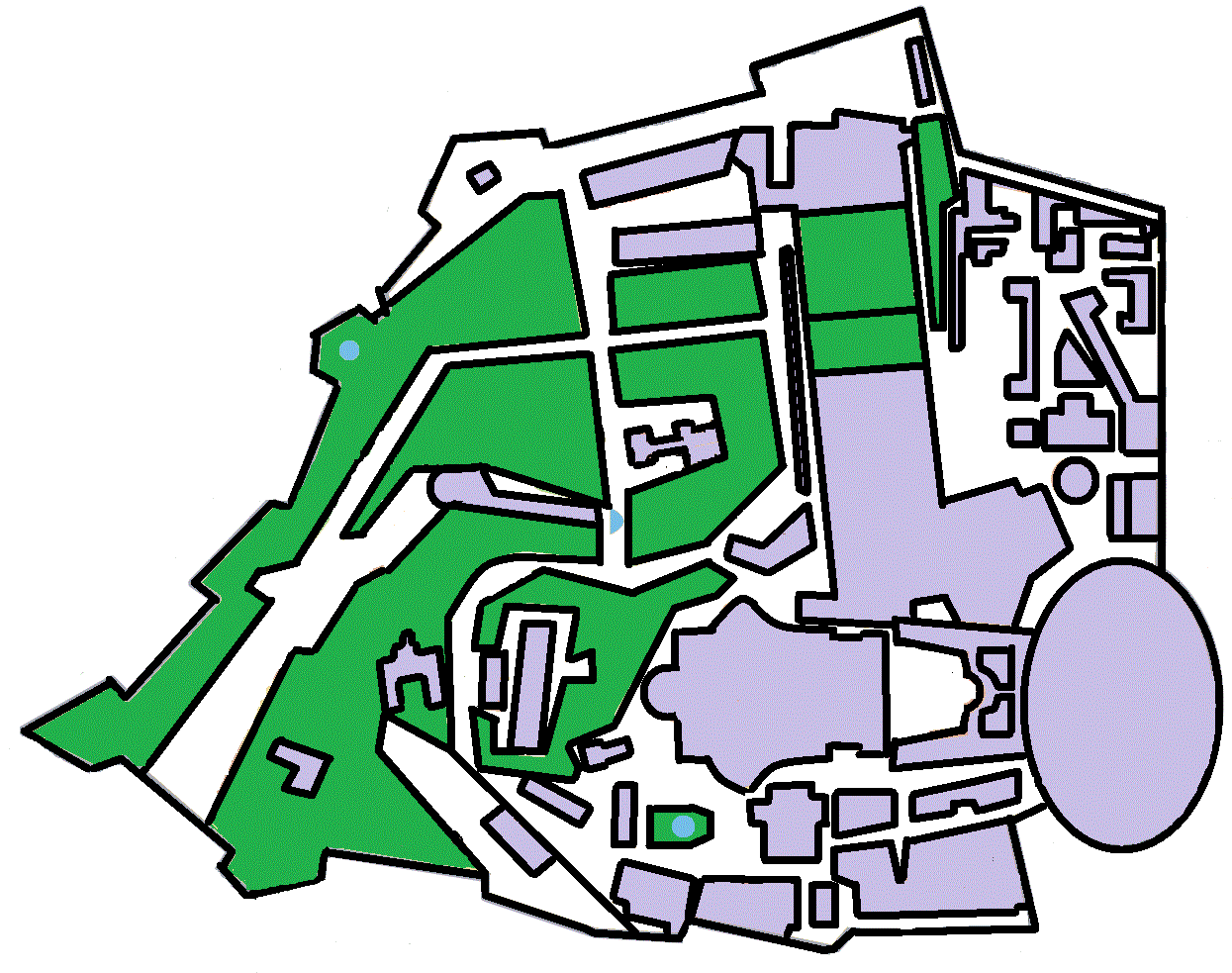
- Location of the Vatican Museums within Vatican City
- Established: 1927; 99 years ago
- Location: Vatican City
- Coordinates: 41°54′23″N 12°27′16″E
- Type: Ethnographic museum
- Collection size: c.80,000
- Director: Father Nicola Mapelli
- Website: Official website

Anima Mundi - Peoples, Arts and Cultures (previously known as the Vatican Ethnological Museum) is a museum of ethnological art and artefacts in the Vatican City. It is part of the Vatican Museums.

== History ==
The main core of the collection arose from the Vatican Exposition of 1925. The exposition was instituted by Pope Pius XI; its success led to the creation of the Missionary Ethnological Museum (Pontifico Museo Missionario-Etnologico) at Lateran Palace. At the formation of the new museum Pius announced that the "dawn of faith among the infidel of today can be compared to the dawn of faith which...illuminated Pagan Rome". The museum opened to the public in 1927 and was moved to modern galleries in the Vatican Museums in 1973.

Wilhelm Schmidt was the inaugural director of the museum. 100,000 objects had been sent from around the globe for the exposition, 40,000 were chosen by a commission led by Schmidt; this formed the nucleus of the original collection. Additional objects were sourced from the Borgia Museum of Propaganda Fide that had been the collection of the 18th-century antiquarian and Cardinal Stefano Borgia.

In the 2020s the museum's holdings were in excess of 80,000 objects and artworks.

The museum was reopened in November 2019 under its new name, Anima Mundi, which means "soul of the world". The name was chosen by Pope Francis. The director of the museum, Father Nicola Mapelli, said that the new name reflects the belief that "When we display objects, we don't display a dead reality, but something that expresses the spirit of a culture through its art". The director of the Vatican Museums, Barbara Jatta, said that the new name declared that the museum was "...where the soul of the world is...Each visitor can find at least a small part of his or her cultural, religious and spiritual identity".

The museum was redesigned between 2018 and 2020 by Studio Adrien Gardère and inaugurated in October 2019 by Pope Francis. In his inauguration of the museum Francis said that "Transparency is an important value, especially in an ecclesial institution. We always need it! In these showcases, over the course of time, thousands of works coming from every part of the world will find space, and this kind of installation is meant to place them effectively in dialogue among themselves. And as works of art are the expression of the spirit of peoples, the message received is that one needs to always look at every culture, at the other, with openness of spirit and with benevolence."

== Collections ==
The earliest objects to have entered the collection are Pre-Columbian era artefacts sent as gifts to Pope Innocent XII in 1692. The collection received numerous objects from Catholic missionaries in the 19th century. A notable collection in the museum is devotional objects from Papua New Guinea collected by Father Franz J. Kirschbaum in the 1920s. The collection includes 200 objects from Indigenous Australians including 10 funeral poles from Melville Island of the Tiwi Islands, and wooden shields from Darwin in the Northern Territory of Australia.

The collection ranges from prehistoric artefacts over two million years old to objects from African, Native American, Islamic, Oceania and Australia, and pre-Columbian civilisations.

The artefacts are displayed on a rotational basis for reasons of conservation.

In 2025, the museum sent 62 indigenous artefacts to the Canadian Conference of Catholic Bishops for repatriation to Canada after they were taken for a 1925 missionary exhibition in Rome.

=== Selected objects ===
- A carving of the Polynesian deity Tu carved from a single block of wood, given to Pope Gregory XVI in 1837.
- A manuscript sent by the Māori to Pope Pius X to mark the death of Pope Leo XIII in 1904.

== Gallery ==
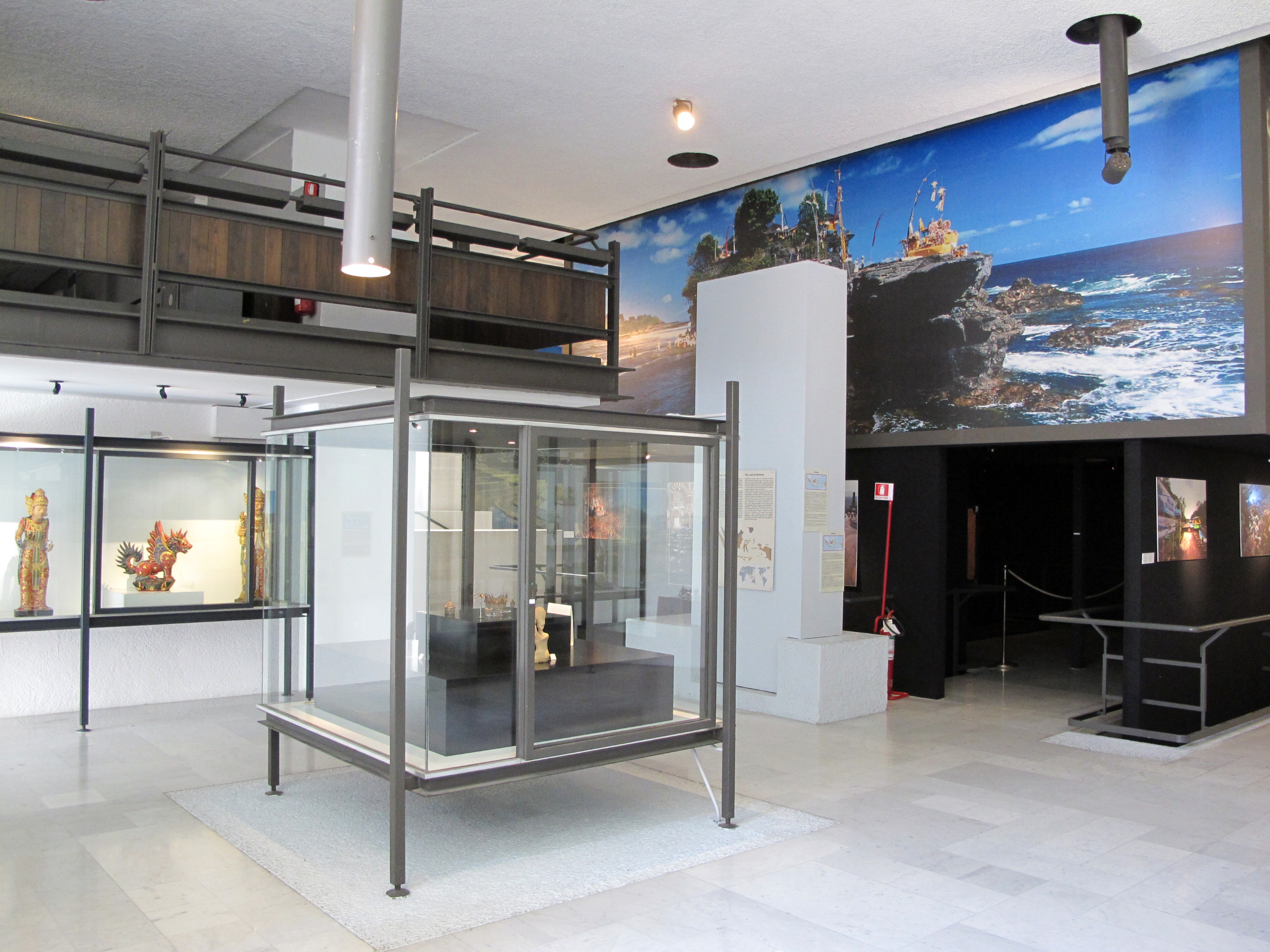
The galleries of Anima Mundi

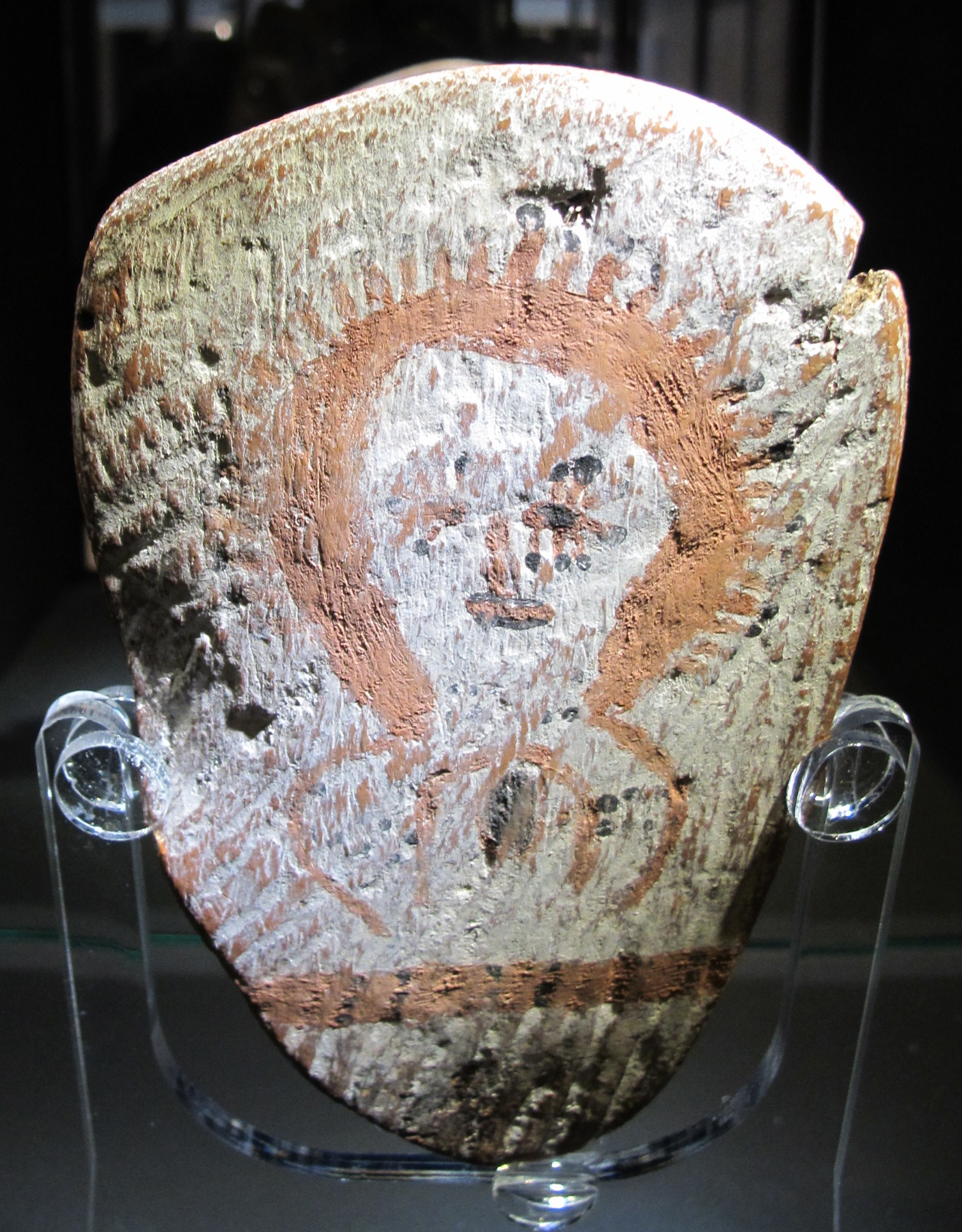
Depiction of Wandjina by an artist from the Walcott Inlet area, Western Australia

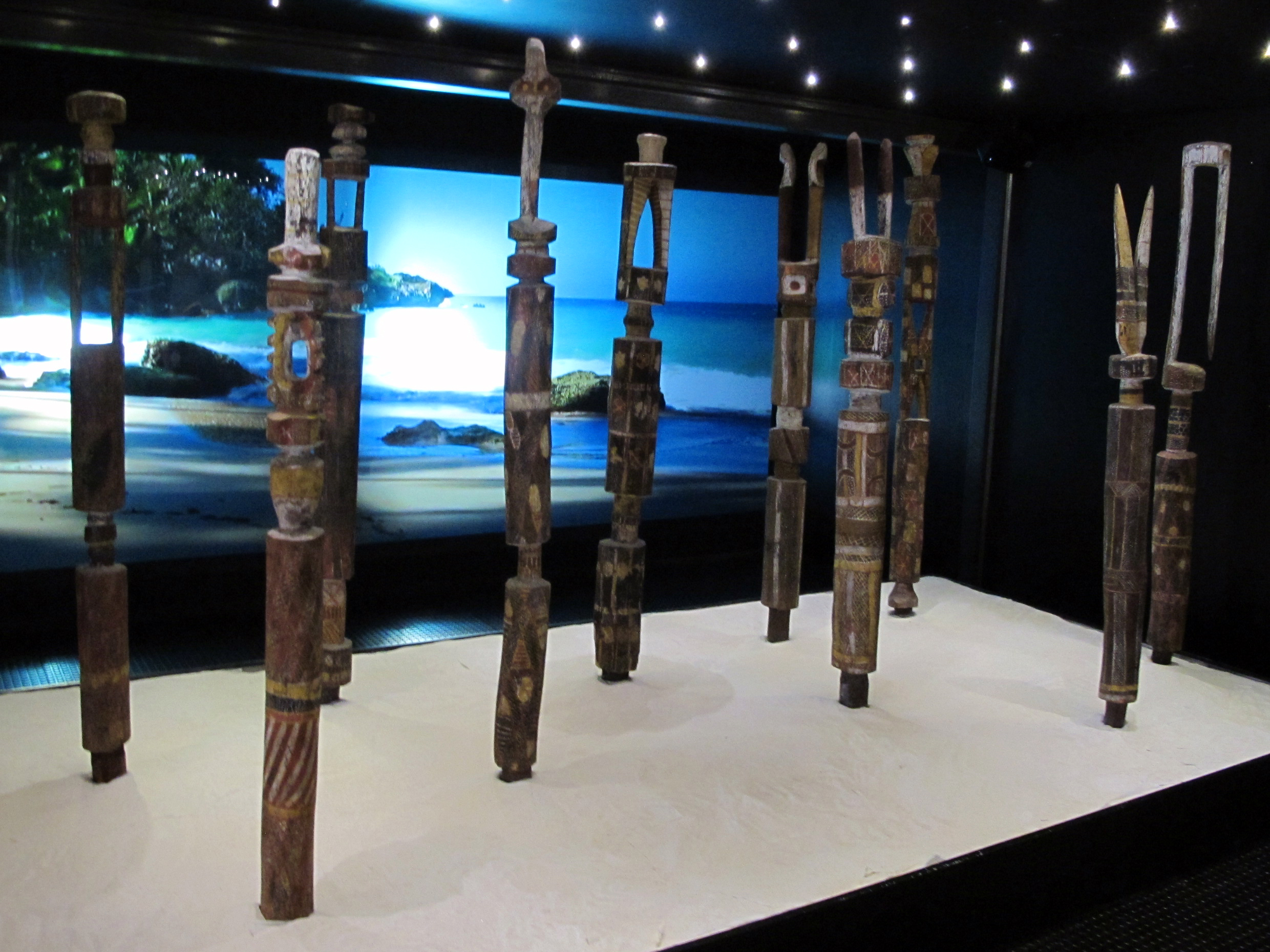
Funerary poles from Melville Island, Northern Territory, Australia

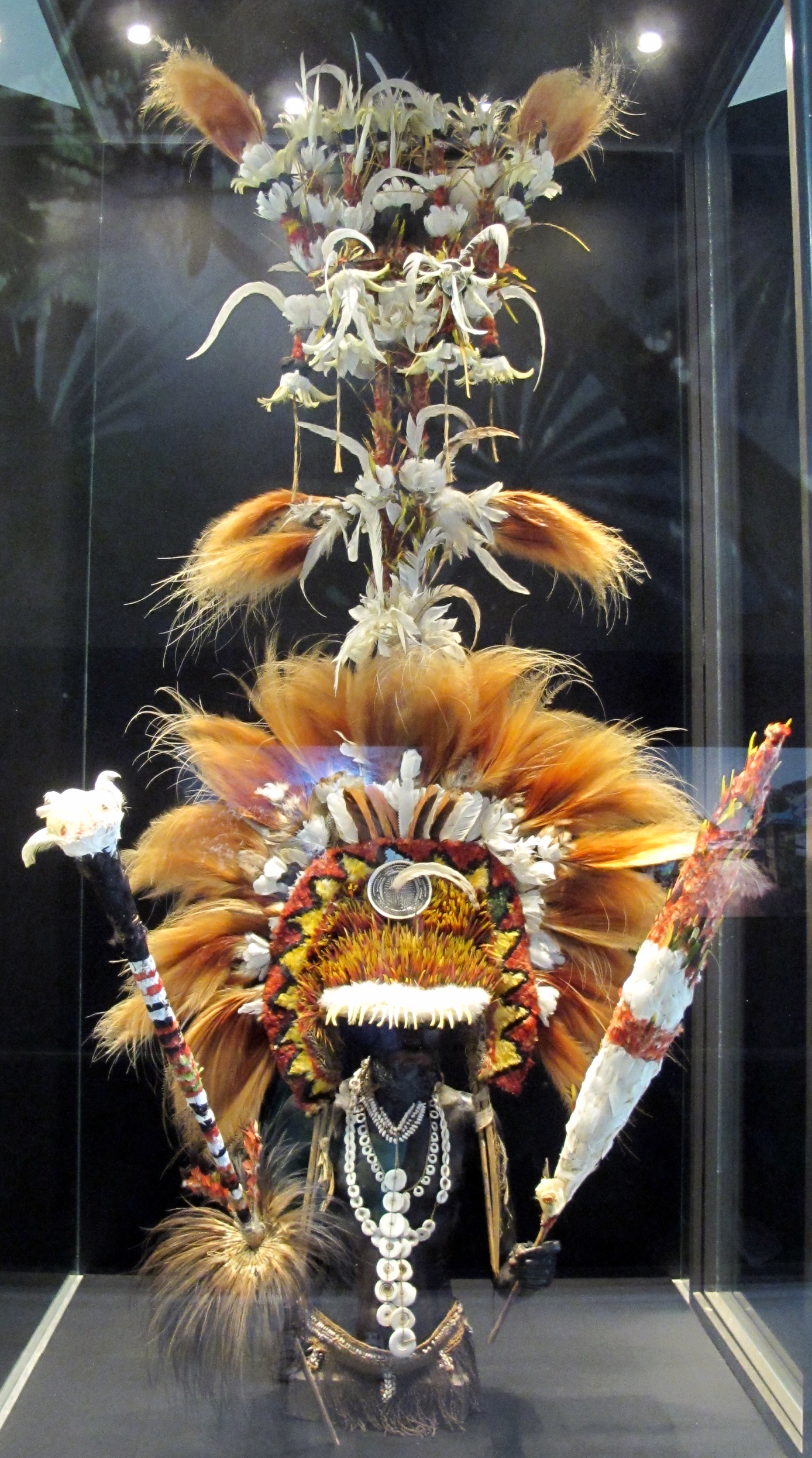
Ceremonial accoutrements of Papua New Guinea

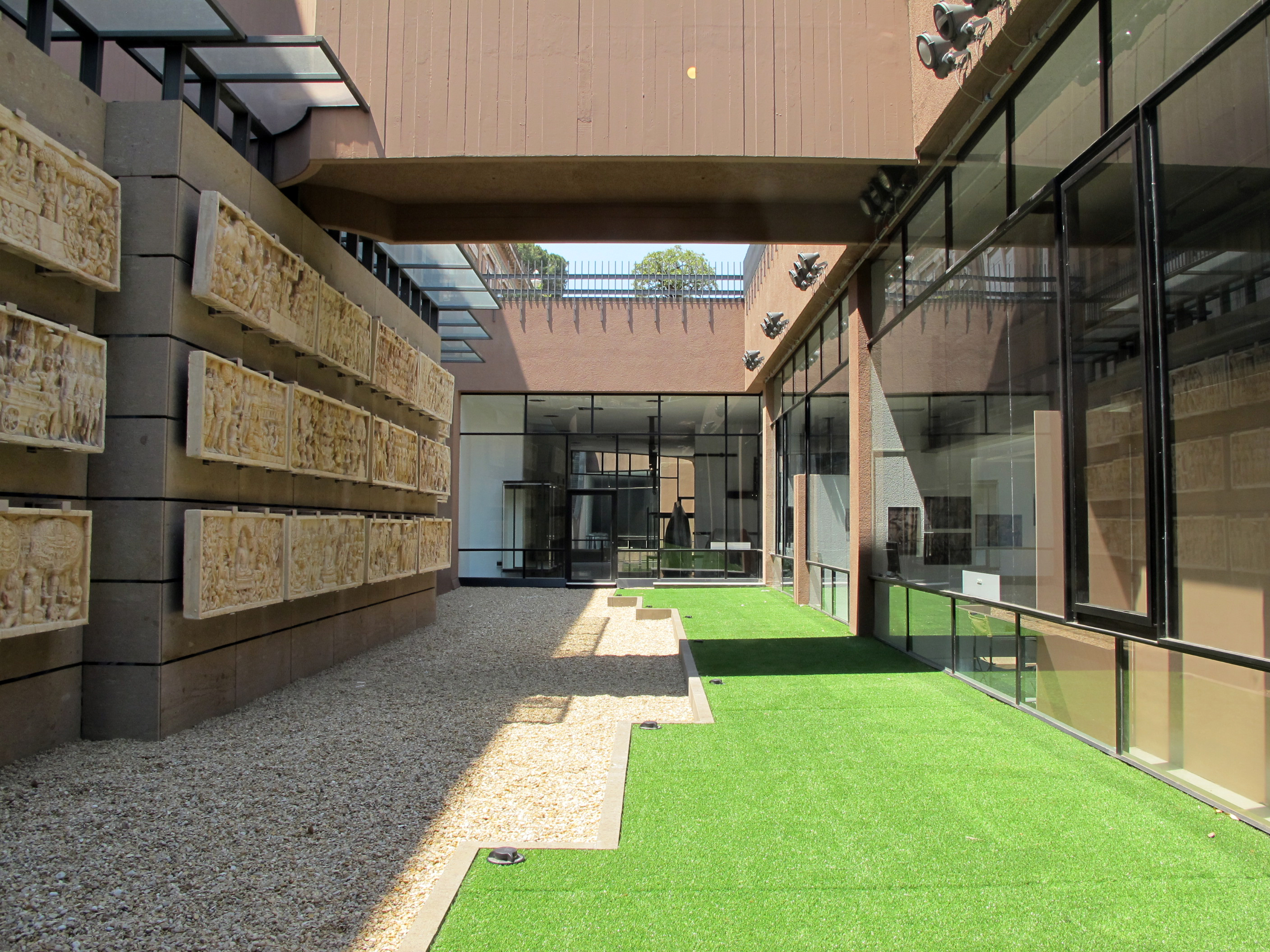
The exterior of Anima Mundi

== Bibliography ==
- Nicola Mapelli; Katherine Aigner; Nadia Fiussello (2012). Ethnos: Vatican Museums Ethnological Collection. Edizioni Musei Vaticani. ISBN 978-88-8271-184-9.
- Katherine Aigner; Nicola Mapelli (2015). The Americas: Collections from the Vatican Ethnological Museum. Edizioni Musei Vaticani. ISBN 978-88-8271-360-7.
- Katherine Aigner, ed. (2017). Australia: The Vatican Museums Indigenous Collection. Edizioni Musei Vaticani. ISBN 978-88-8271-411-6.

== See also ==
- Index of Vatican City–related articles
