= Casina Pio IV =

Patrician villa in Vatican City; seat of the Pontificial Academy of Sciences

Coordinates: 41°54′15″N 012°27′09″E

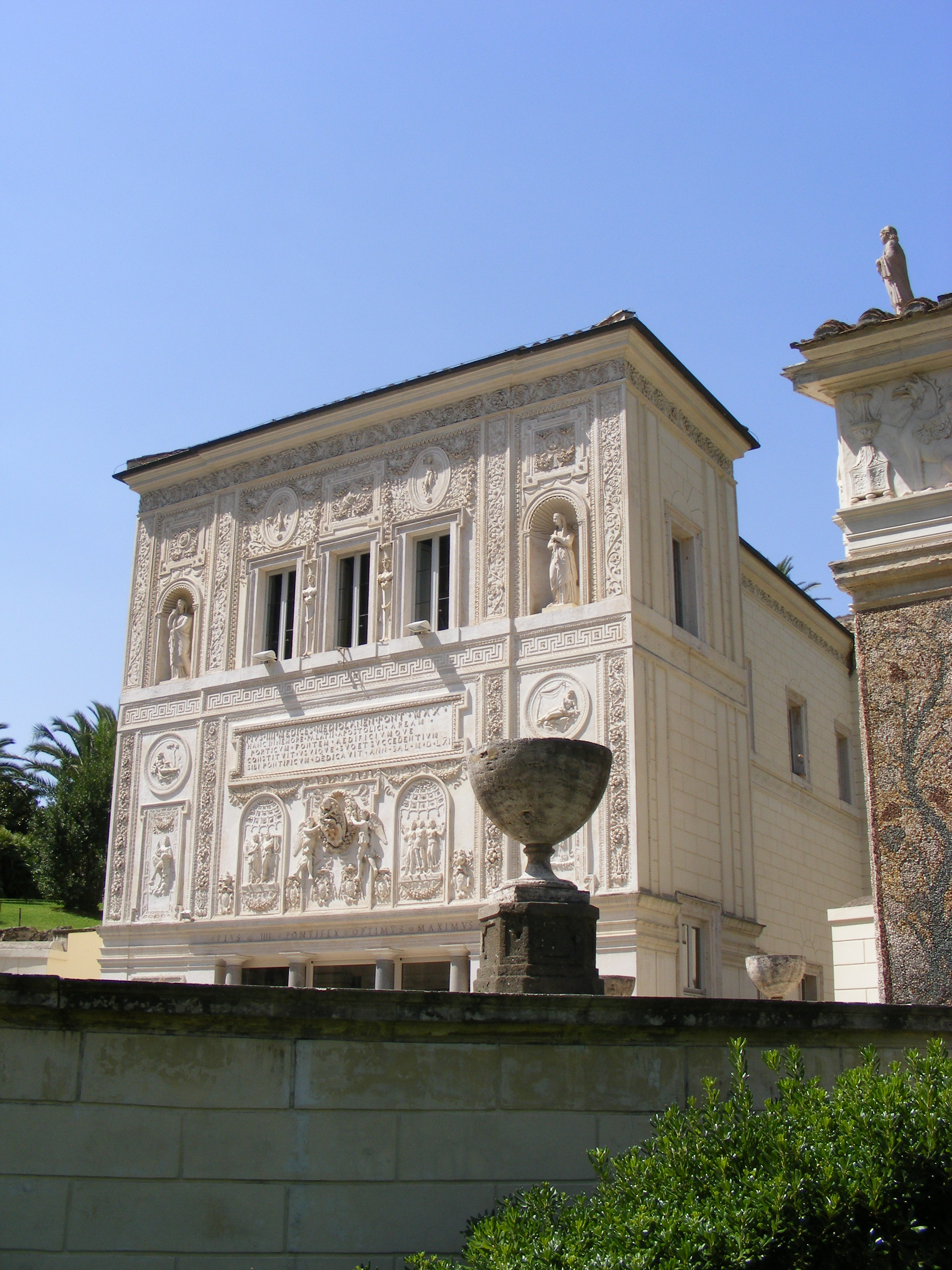
The highly charged Mannerist front of the Casina Pio IV

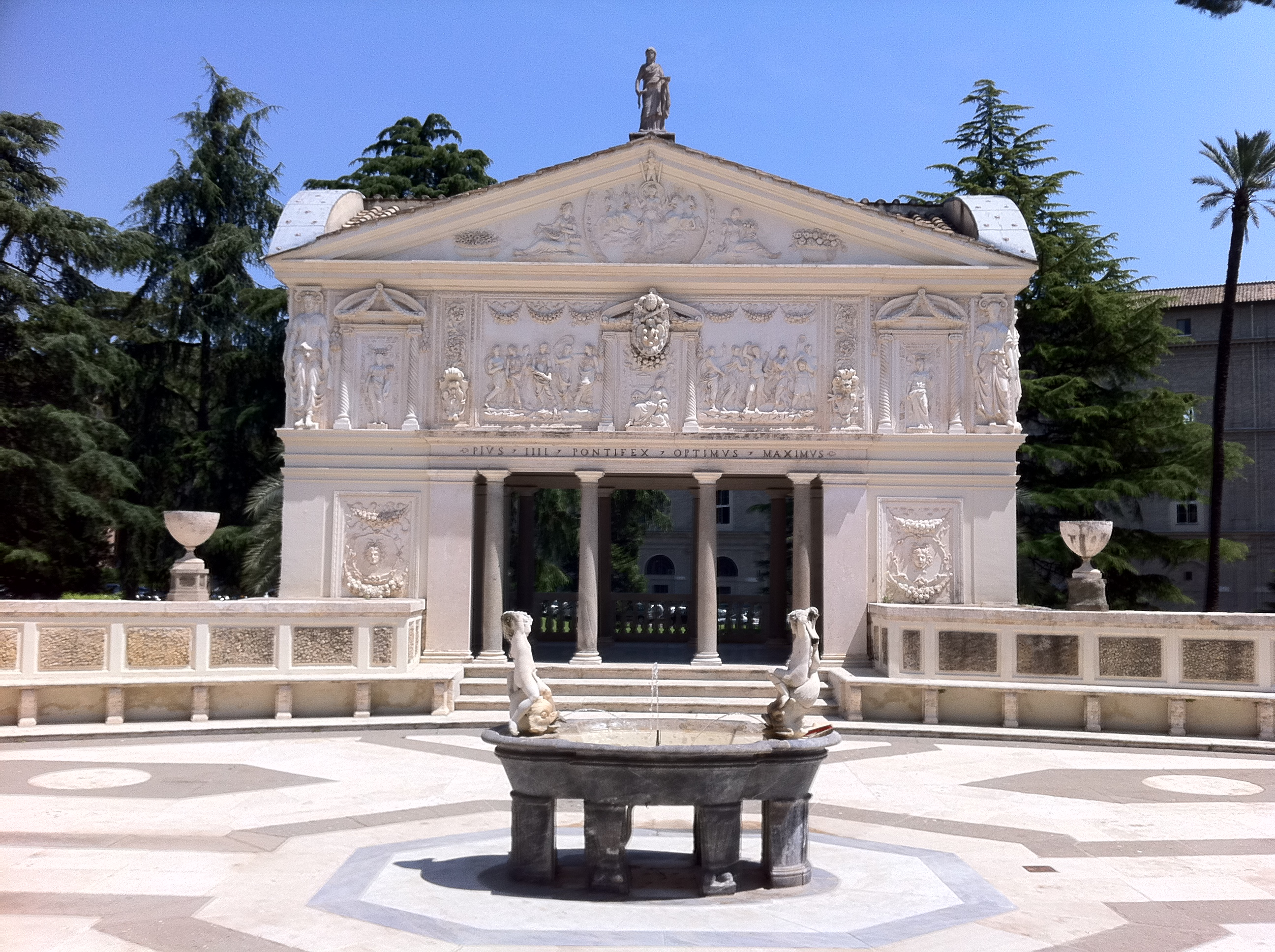
The courtyard

Location on a map of Vatican City

The Casina Pio IV (or Villa Pia) is a patrician villa in Vatican City which is now home to the Pontifical Academy of Sciences, the Pontifical Academy of Social Sciences and the Pontifical Academy of St. Thomas Aquinas. The predecessor of the present complex structure was begun in the spring of 1558 by Pope Paul IV in the Vatican Gardens, west of the Cortile del Belvedere. Paul IV commissioned the initial project of the 'Casina del Boschetto', as it was originally called, from an unknown architect; the first mention of the single-storey building can be found on 30 April 1558, and a notice of the following 6 May, says that the Pope spent "two thirds of his time at the Belvedere, where he has begun to build a fountain in the woods".

Upon Paul IV's death on 18 August 1559, Pope Pius IV took on the project, which had not yet been completed, and, turning to Pirro Ligorio, improved it. The complex, as it was completed in 1562, comprised an elliptical cortile, two free-standing portals, and the loggia with its fountain. Rich sculptural stuccos, once supplemented by some fifty ancient Roman sculptures, enliven the exterior (illustration). A team of at least six major painters, including Federico Barocci, Federico Zuccari, and Santi di Tito and their assistants, frescoed the interiors.

The Casina's rich and at times obscure iconographic programme, of the efficacy of baptism, the primacy of the papacy and the welcomed punitive powers of the Church, seems to have been inspired by Cardinal Charles Borromeo, nephew of Pius IV, who probably had it in mind as the headquarters for the Academy he was about to found, on 20 April 1562, called Accademia Noctes Vaticanae. Graham Smith suggests that the interrelated iconography of the interior frescoes was inspired by Cardinal Marcantonio da Mula.

Pope Pius XI, the founder of the current Pontifical Academy of Sciences, made the Casina the Academy's current headquarters in 1936.

== See also ==
- Index of Vatican City-related articles

== General references ==
- Friedländer, Walter (1912). Das Kasino Pius des Vierten. Kunstgeschichtlichen forschungen, 3. Leipzig: Karl W. Hierseman. OCLC 803230407. The first modern monograph based on documentation.
- Losito, Maria (2010). The Casina Pio IV in the Vatican. Translated by Gabriella Clare Marino. Vatican City: Pontificia Academia Scientiarum. ISBN 978-88-7761-099-7. OCLC 955239788.
- Smith, Graham (1977). The Casino of Pius IV. Princeton, N.J.: Princeton University Press. ISBN 9780691039152. OCLC 983924623.
  - Partridge, Loren W. (June 1978). "Review: [Untitled]". The Art Bulletin. 60 (2): 369–372. doi:10.2307/3049799. JSTOR 3049799. An extended critical review, analyzing the iconographic program in detail.
