= Coat of arms of Vatican City =

- 2023 version of the arms
- Adopted: 7 June 1929
- Shield: The 2023 Fundamental Law of Vatican City State describes the shield as "chiavi decussate sormontate del Triregno in campo rosso" ("keys in saltire surmounted by the papal tiara on a red field")

The coat of arms of Vatican City is the coat of arms used by Vatican City, which was originally adopted by the Fundamental Law of Vatican City State on 7 June 1929. This coat of arms is defined by law as having the silver key in bend and the gold key in bend sinister.

== History ==
The original 1929 Fundamental Law of Vatican City State describes the Vatican City's coat of arms in its article 19 and the law's annex B.

The coat of arms was also described in the Fundamental Law of Vatican City State in force from 2001 to 2023, in its article 20 and in the law's "Annex B. Official coat of arms of Vatican City State".

Vatican City's coat of arms is described in the 2023 Fundamental Law of Vatican City State, in its article 23 which simply states to refer to the law's Annex B.

== See also ==
- Flag of Vatican City
- Papal coats of arms
- Papal regalia and insignia
- Vatican City and Holy See passports
- Coat of arms of the Holy See

== Sources ==
- Text of the 1929 Fundamental Law of Vatican City State (pp. 2-5 of PDF), with Annex B (p. 36 of PDF) depicting the coat of arms
- Text of the 2000 Fundamental Law of Vatican City State (pp. 1054-61 of PDF), with Annex B (p. 1063 of PDF) depicting the coat of arms
- Annex B of the 2023 Fundamental Law of Vatican City State, depicting the coat of arms
