= Pontifical Academy of Social Sciences =

Scientific academy of the Vatican City

Coordinates: 41°54′15″N 12°27′10″E

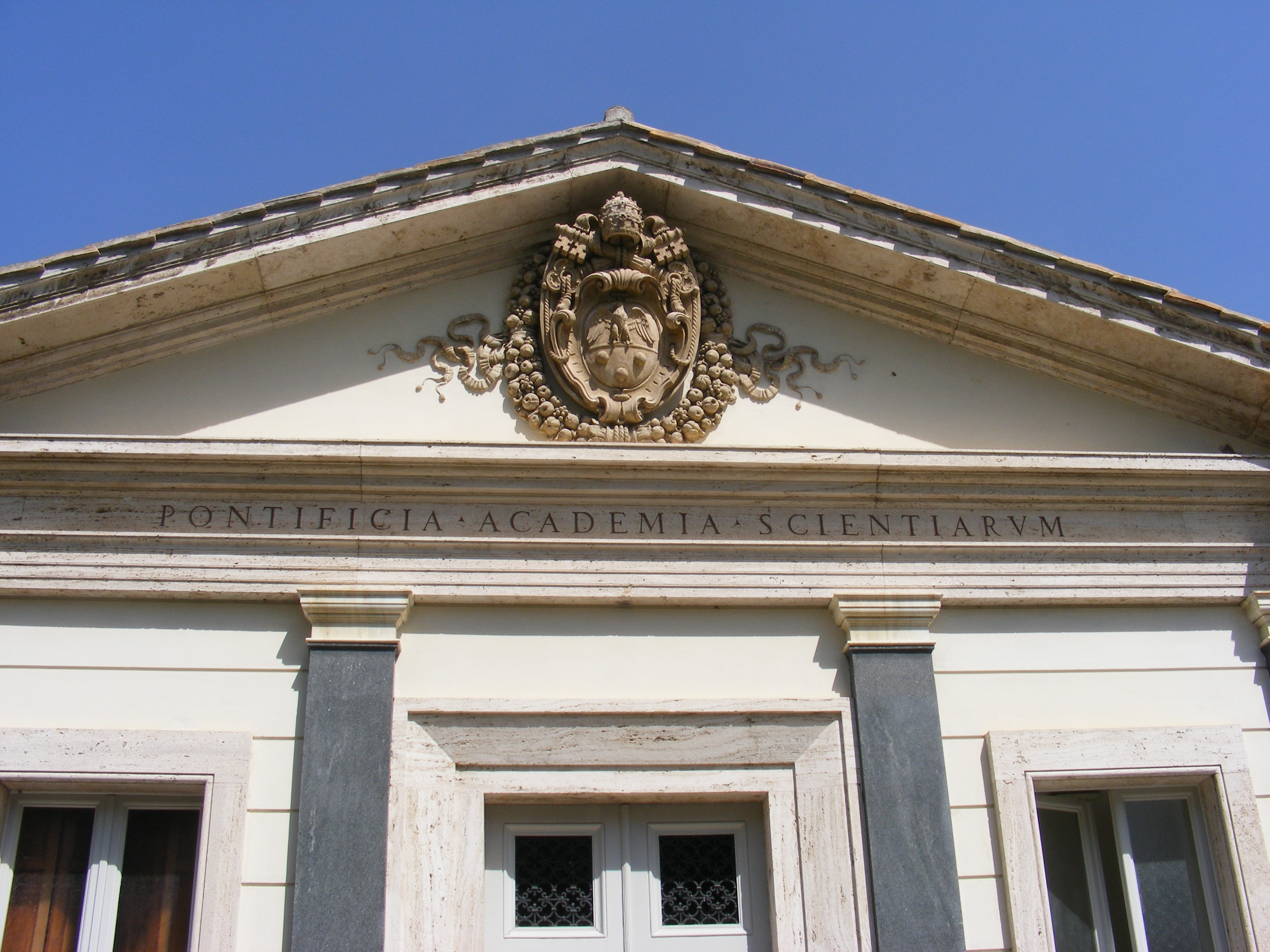
Entrance to the academy

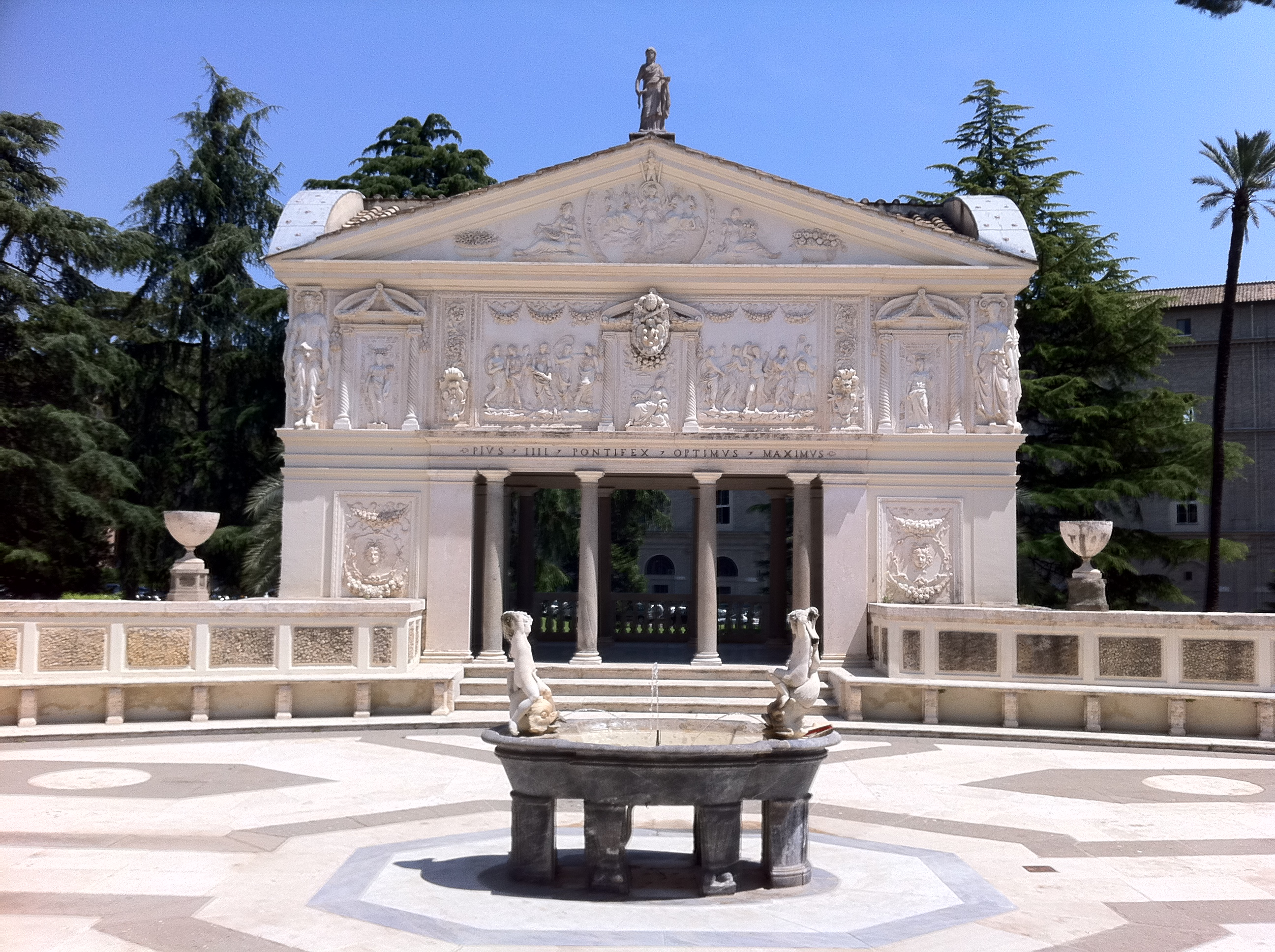
Courtyard of the academy

The Pontifical Academy of Social Sciences (Latin: Pontificia Academia Scientiarum Socialium, or PASS) is a pontifical academy established on 1 January 1994 by Pope John Paul II and is headquartered in the Casina Pio IV in Vatican City. It operates much like other learned societies worldwide, but has the special task of entering into dialogue with the Church. Its scientific activities are organised and focused to promote this dialogue.

== History ==
PASS is one of the ten pontifical academies at the Vatican in Rome. It was established to promote the study of social sciences, primarily economics, sociology, law, and political science. Through appropriate dialogue it offers the Roman Catholic Church elements useful to the development of its social teaching, and it reflects on the application of that doctrine in contemporary society. PASS, which is autonomous, maintains a close relationship with the Pontifical Council for Justice and Peace.

French economist Edmond Malinvaud was the first president of the academy, from 1994 to 2000. In April 2014, Pope Francis appointed British sociologist Margaret Archer to the post. The current president is Helen Alford.

PASS is headquartered in the Casina Pio IV in the heart of the Vatican Gardens along with its sister academy, the Pontifical Academy of Sciences. The chancellor of both academies is Cardinal Peter Turkson.

== See also ==
- Global organisation of the Catholic Church
- Pontifical Academy of Sciences
- Motu proprio
