= Bramante Staircase =

Two staircases in the Vatican Museums, built in 1505 and 1932

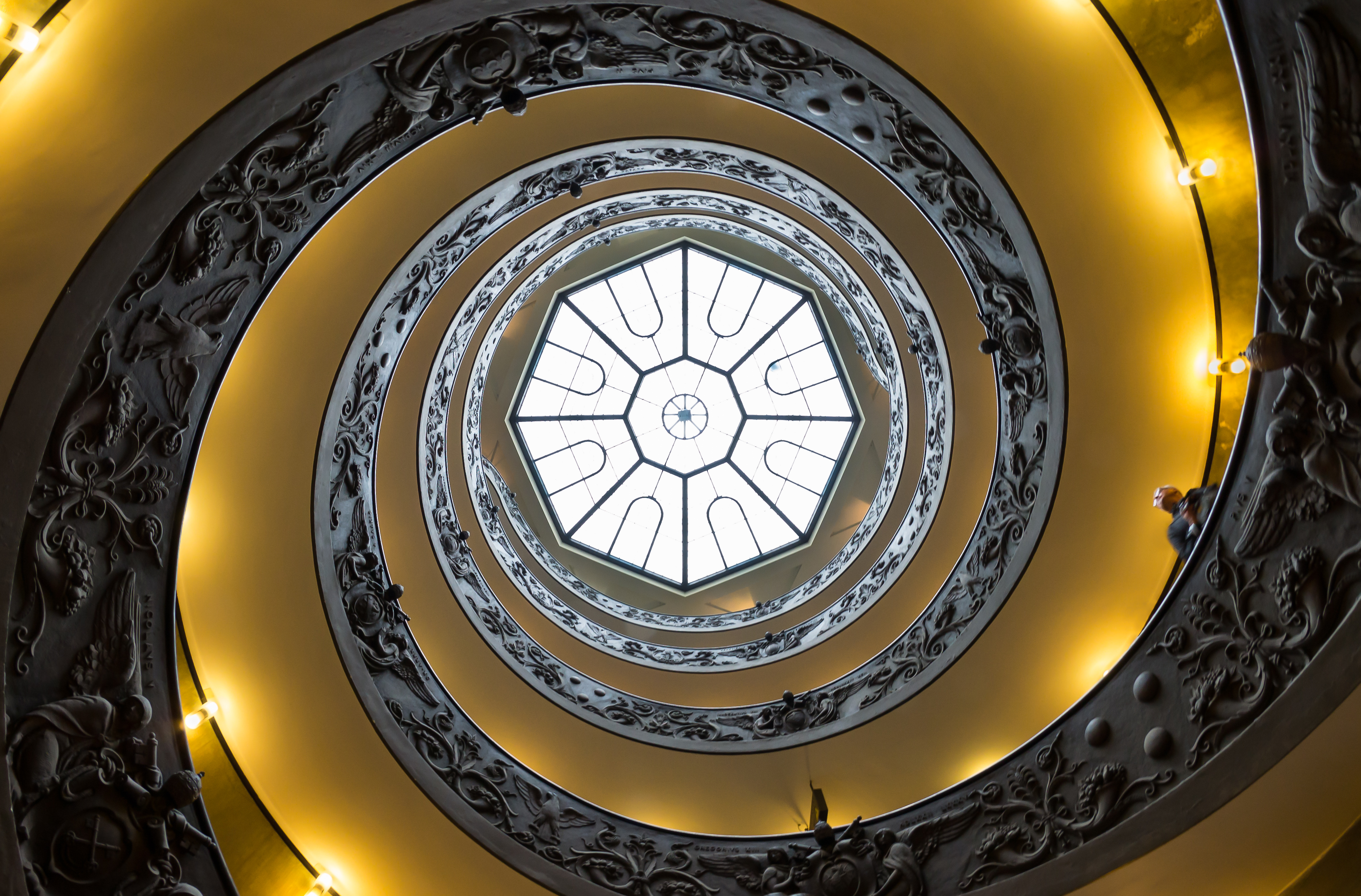
- The "Momo", modern evolution of 'Bramante' spiral stairs of 1932.
- Click on the map for a fullscreen view
- Location: Vatican Museums
- 41°54′23″N 12°27′16″E

Bramante Staircase is the name given to two staircases in the Vatican Museums in the Vatican City State: the original stair, built in 1505, and a modern equivalent from 1932.

== The original staircase ==
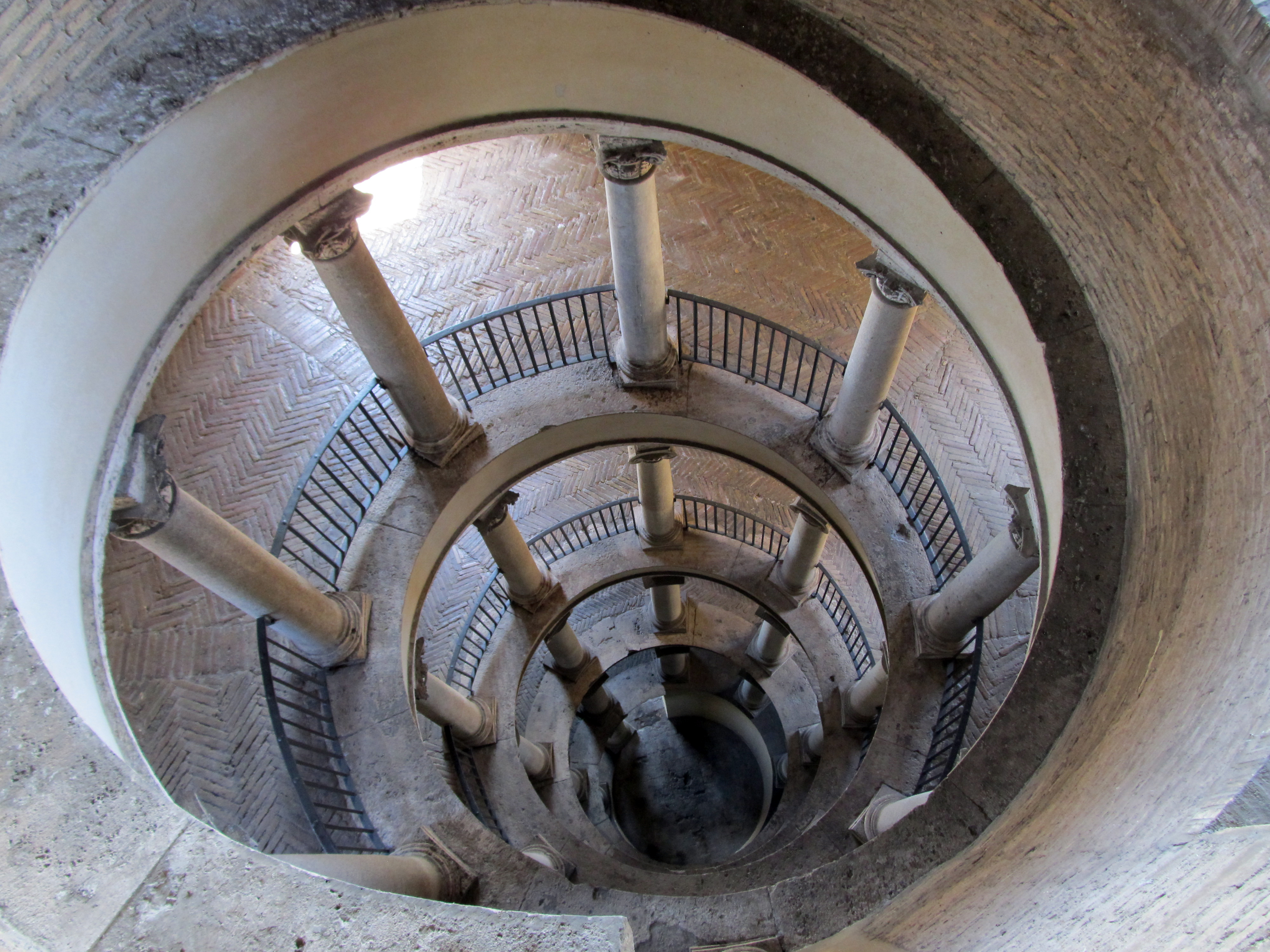
The original Bramante staircase, built in 1505

The original Bramante staircase, in the Pio-Clementine Museum, was built in 1505 to a double helix design by Donato Bramante. It connects the Belvedere palace of Pope Innocent VIII to the outside and stands in a square tower of that building.

The Bramante Staircase is supported by 36 granite columns along the inner side. These columns progressively diminish in diameter toward the top (roughly halving over the full height while maintaining similar heights), creating a natural perspectival effect of increasing lightness. A key feature is the fluid sequence of the five classical orders, changing with each full turn of the spiral: Tuscan (base), Doric, Ionic, Corinthian and Composite (top). This superposition demonstrates Renaissance mastery of classical architecture in one continuous, “organic” structure.

The pavement has a herringbone paving pattern, and was designed as a double helix, to allow people and pack animals to ascend and descend without interruption. The stair is cited as the inspiration for Antonio da Sangallo the Younger's design for the double helix passageway at the well of San Patrizio in Orvieto, to solve a similar logistical problem. The staircase was built to allow Pope Julius II to enter his private residence while still in his carriage, since walking up the several flights in heavy papal vestments would have been onerous.

It is not generally open to the public, though specialist tours do visit.

== The modern staircase ==
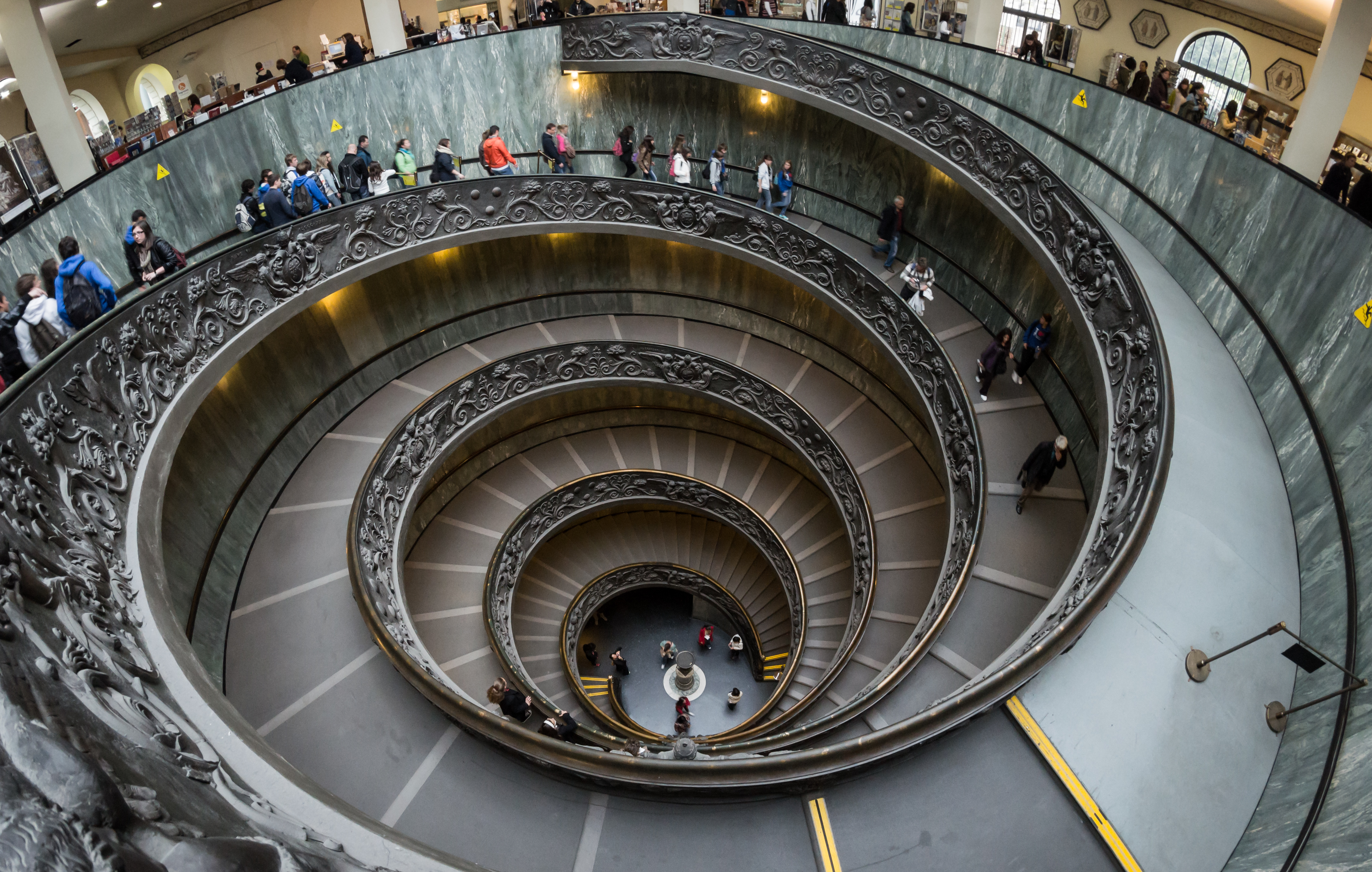
The modern 'Bramante' spiral stairs of the Vatican Museums, designed by Giuseppe Momo in 1932

The modern double helix staircase, also in the Pio-Clementine Museum, and commonly referred to as the "Bramante Staircase", was designed by Giuseppe Momo, sculpted by Antonio Maraini and realized by the Ferdinando Marinelli Artistic Foundry in 1932 and was inspired by the original Bramante Staircase. This staircase, like the original, is a double helix, having two staircases allowing people to ascend without meeting people descending; as with the original, the main purpose of this design is to allow uninterrupted traffic in each direction. It encircles the outer wall of a stairwell approximately fifteen meters wide and with a clear space at the centre. The balustrade around the ramp is of ornately worked metal. A canopy located above provides the necessary light to illuminate the stairs. The staircase is located at the end of the museum visit and all visitors leave by this route.

Several architecture professors have speculated that Momo’s staircase (particularly the skylight and atrium, and the helical nature of the ramp and the technical aspects of its construction) was the inspiration for Frank Lloyd Wright’s design for the Solomon R. Guggenheim Museum in New York.

== See also ==
- Index of Vatican City–related articles
