= Association of Vatican Lay Workers =

Sole trade union in Vatican City

ADLV
- Association of Vatican Lay Workers
- Associazione Dipendenti Laici Vaticani
- Founded: 1985
- Type: Trade union
- Location: Vatican City
- Members: 1,000
- General Secretary: Paola Monaco
- Website: www.adlvaticano.org

The Association of Vatican Lay Workers (Italian: Associazione Dipendenti Laici Vaticani; ADLV) is a kind of trade union in Vatican City.

The ADLV was founded in 1979 and, as stated in its Statute, is a free and independent organisation of lay employees whose purpose is to protect the professional, legal, economic, moral and collective interests of its members and to promote the improvement of their living and working conditions, affirming its faith in the dignity of the human person, in their unique value and in fundamental human rights, according to the Social Doctrine of the Church. Recognised as legitimately constituted since 1980 by St. John Paul II, it is mentioned in the Letter of the Supreme Pontiff John Paul II on the meaning of work performed at the Apostolic See in 1982 as an “initiative in accordance with the Social Doctrine of the Church” that can 'perform a valuable task of collaboration' and “a fruitful function in the working community operating in harmony with the Apostolic See”.

The first ever strike in the Vatican was organized by the ADLV in 1988. In 1992 the union organised a successful mass resignation campaign to protest against the absence of pensions for workers. Vatican authorities formally recognised the ADLV in 1993.
