= Fundamental Law of Vatican City State =

Constitution of Vatican City State

The Fundamental Law of Vatican City State (Italian: Legge Fondamentale dello Stato della Città del Vaticano) is the main governing legal document of the Vatican's civil entities. The Fundamental Law has existed since 1929.

== History ==
The Fundamental Law was first published on 7 June 1929, on the authority of Pius XI.

On 26 November 2000, Pope John Paul II promulgated a new version of the Fundamental Law. It obtained the force of law on 22 February 2001, Feast of the Chair of St. Peter, and replaced in its entirety the Fundamental Law of Vatican City of 7 June 1929. All the norms in force in Vatican City State which were not in agreement with the new Fundamental Law were abrogated.

On 13 May 2023, Pope Francis published a new version of the Fundamental Law. This new version took effect on 7 June 2023.

Pope Leo XIV subsequently signed a new version of the Fundamental Law on 31 July 2026, with immediate entry into force.

== See also ==
- Law of Vatican City
