= Easter in Vatican City =

Easter celebrations and traditions in Vatican City

Lent, Triduum, and Easter Season
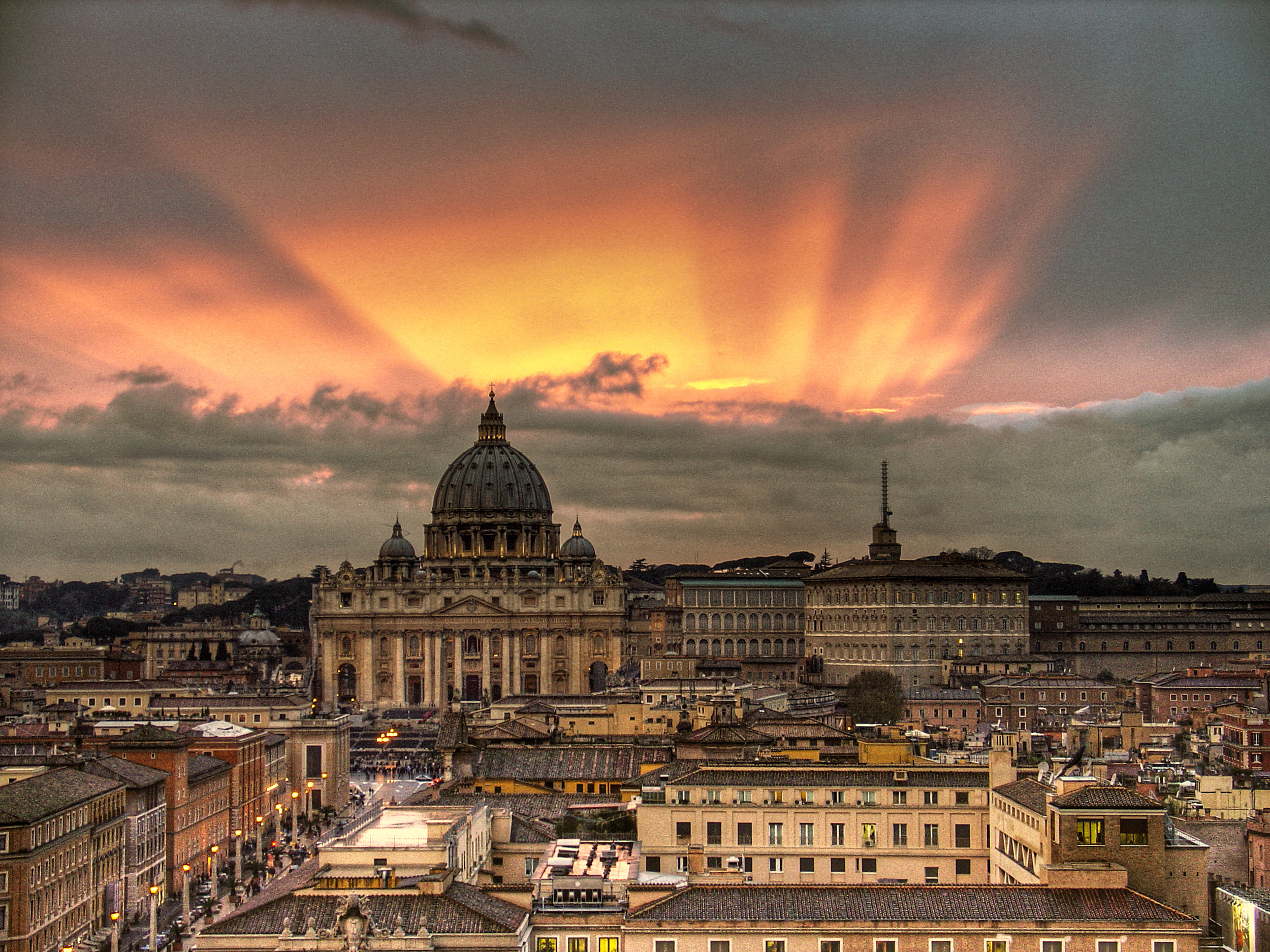
- Basilica of St. Peter, Easter 2008.
- Observed by: Vatican City State
- Celebrations: Ash Wednesday; Laetare Sunday; Passiontide; Holy Week; Palm Sunday; Chrism Mass; Paschal Triduum; Holy Thursday; Good Friday; Holy Saturday; Easter Sunday; Easter Vigil; Easter Urbi et Orbi; Octave of Easter; Divine Mercy Sunday; Ascension Thursday; Pentecost Novena; Pentecost Sunday
- Begins: Lent: Ash Wednesday; Triduum: Holy Thursday; Easter: Easter Vigil
- Ends: Lent: Easter Vigil; Triduum: Easter Sunday; Easter: Pentecost Sunday
- 2025 date: Lent: 5 March – 19 April; Triduum: 17 April – 20 April; Easter: 19 April – 8 June
- 2026 date: Lent: 18 February – 4 April; Triduum: 2 April – 5 April; Easter: 4 April – 24 May
- 2027 date: Lent: 10 February – 27 March; Triduum: 25 March – 28 March; Easter: 27 March – 16 May
- 2028 date: Lent: 1 March – 15 April; Triduum: 13 April – 16 April; Easter: 15 April – 4 June
- Duration: Lent: 46 days; Triduum: 3 days; Easter: 50 days
- Frequency: Annual

Easter in Vatican City (Italian: Pasqua, Latin: Pascha) is one of the Vatican's major holidays. Ash Wednesday (46 days before Easter Sunday) is the beginning of the Lenten season. Vatican City than enters Holy Week with Palm Sunday, Holy Thursday, Good Friday and Holy Saturday, concluding with Easter Sunday. Each day has a special significance. The Easter Season starts on Easter Sunday and last 50 days ending on Pentecost Sunday.

The Lent, Triduum, and Easter season include the following Public holidays in Vatican City:

- Lateran Treaty Day (11 February sometimes occurs after Lent starts)
- Saint Joseph's Day (19 March)
- Easter Sunday (Varies annually)
- Easter Monday (Monday after Easter)
- Anniversary of the Election of Pope Leo XIV (8 May)
- Saint Joseph the Worker (1 May)

== Lenten Season ==
Lent (Latin: Quadragesima, 'Fortieth') is the solemn Christian religious observance in the liturgical year in preparation for Easter. It echoes the 40 days Jesus spent fasting in the desert and enduring temptation by Satan, according to the Gospels of Matthew, Mark and Luke, before beginning his public ministry.

=== Ash Wednesday ===
Ash Wednesday is a holy day of prayer and fasting in many Western Christian denominations. It is preceded by Shrove Tuesday and marks the first day of Lent: the seven weeks of prayer, fasting, and almsgiving before the arrival of Easter.

=== Saint Joseph's Day ===
The Solemnity of Saint Joseph, is in Christianity the principal feast day of Saint Joseph, husband of the Virgin Mary and legal father of Jesus Christ, celebrated on 19 March. It has the rank of a solemnity in the Catholic Church. It is public Holiday in Vatican City. Saint Joseph's Day is also Father's Day in some Catholic countries, mainly Spain, Portugal, Croatia, and Italy.

=== Palm Sunday ===
Palm Sunday is the Christian moveable feast that falls on the Sunday before Easter. The feast commemorates Jesus Christ's triumphal entry into Jerusalem, as described in all four canonical Gospels, and takes its name from the palm branches waved by the crowd to greet and honor Jesus as he entered the city. Palm Sunday marks the first day of Holy Week; in Western Christianity, this is the beginning of the last week of the solemn season of Lent, preceding Eastertide.

== Paschal Triduum ==
The Paschal Triduum or Easter Triduum (Latin: Triduum Paschale), is the Christian period of three days that begins with the liturgy on the evening of Holy Thursday, reaches its high point in the Easter Vigil, and closes with evening prayer on Easter Sunday. It is a moveable observance recalling the Passion, Crucifixion, Death, burial, and Resurrection of Jesus, as portrayed in the canonical Gospels.

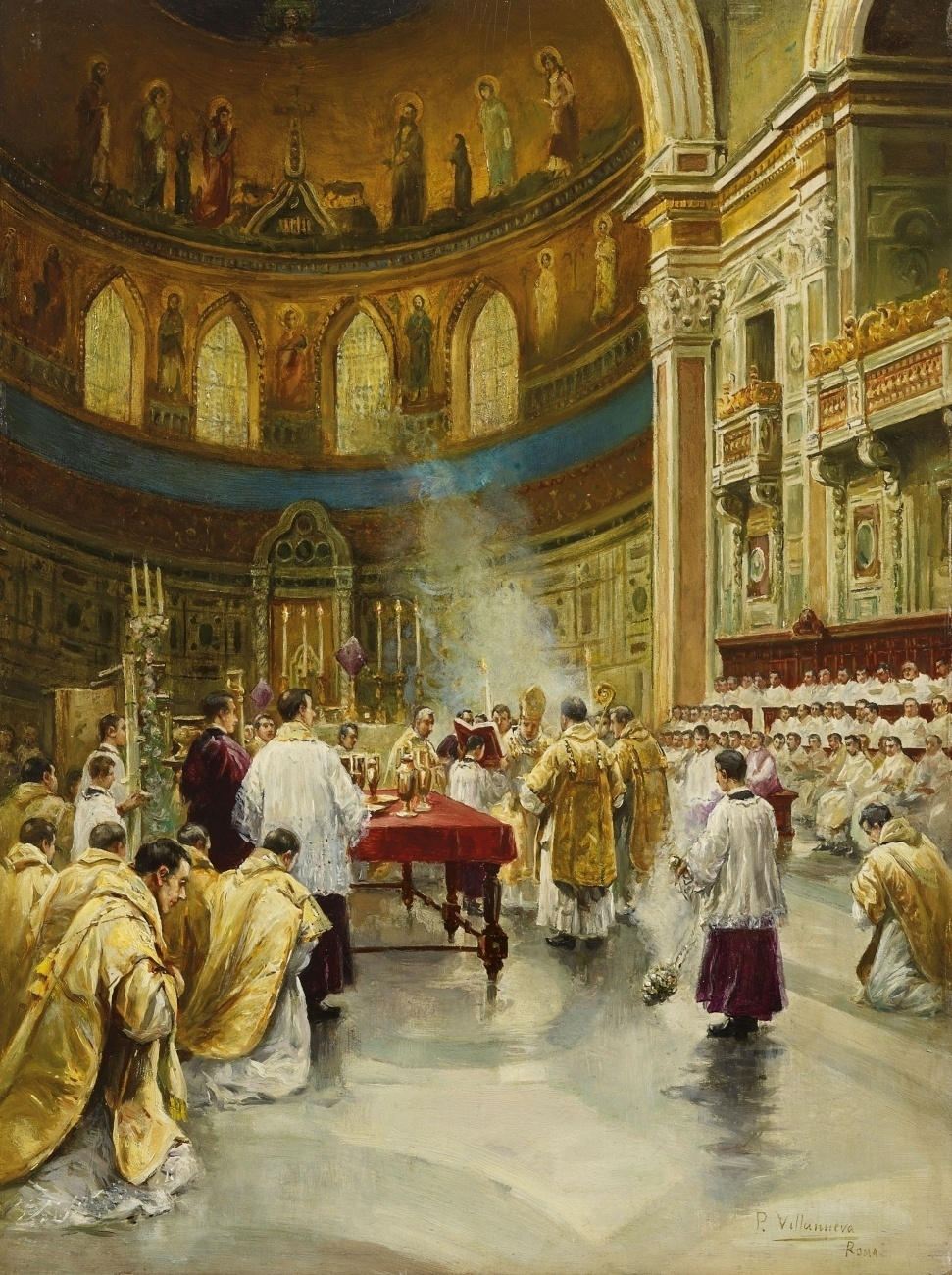
Blessing of the Chrism on Holy Thursday in the Lateran Basilica. Signed P. Villanueva, circa 1900

=== Holy Thursday ===
Holy Thursday, also referred to as Maundy Thursday, is a Christian feast during Holy Week that marks the beginning of the Paschal Triduum, and commemorates the Washing of the Feet (Maundy) and Last Supper of Jesus Christ with the Apostles, as described in the canonical gospels.

==== Chrism Mass ====
The Chrism Mass is usually celebrated each year on Holy Thursday or on another day of Holy Week. During the ceremony, the holy oils used for sacraments and rituals are blessed or consecrated. The Chrism Mass is one of the most solemn and important liturgies of the liturgical calendar.

==== Mass of the Lord's Supper ====
The Mass of the Lord's Supper is a Holy Week service celebrated on the evening of Holy Thursday. It inaugurates the Easter Triduum, and commemorates the Last Supper of Jesus with his disciples establishing the Eucharist, more explicitly than other celebrations of the Mass.

=== Good Friday ===
Good Friday is a solemn Christian holy day commemorating the crucifixion of Jesus and his death at Calvary (Golgotha), part of the Passion of Jesus. It is observed during Holy Week as part of the Paschal Triduum.

==== Good Friday Service ====
The Celebration of the Passion of the Lord takes place in the afternoon, ideally at three o'clock; however, for pastoral reasons (especially in countries where Good Friday is not a public holiday), it is permissible to celebrate the liturgy earlier, even shortly after midday, or at a later hour. The celebration consists of three parts: the liturgy of the word, the adoration of the cross, and the Holy communion. The altar is bare, without cross, candlesticks and altar cloths. It is also customary to empty the holy water fonts in preparation of the blessing of the water at the Easter Vigil. Traditionally, no bells are rung on Good Friday or Holy Saturday until the Easter Vigil.

=== Holy Saturday ===
Holy Saturday is the final day of Holy Week, between Good Friday and Easter Sunday, and when Christians prepare for the Christian feast of Easter.

==== Easter Vigil Mass ====
The Easter Vigil is a liturgy held in traditional Christian churches as the first official celebration of the Resurrection of Jesus. Historically, it is during this liturgy that people are baptized and that adult catechumens are received into full communion with the Church. It is held in the hours of darkness between sunset on Holy Saturday and sunrise on Easter Day – most commonly in the evening of Holy Saturday or midnight – and is the first celebration of Easter, days traditionally being considered to begin at sunset.

== Easter Season ==
Eastertide (also known as Eastertime or the Easter season) is a festal season in the liturgical year of Christianity that focuses on celebrating the Resurrection of Jesus Christ. Preceded by Lent, it begins on Easter Sunday and ends on Pentecost Sunday.

Ticket to Easter Mass in Vatican City

=== Easter Sunday ===
Easter Sunday commemorates the resurrection of Jesus from the dead, described in the Bible's New Testament as having occurred on the third day of his burial following his crucifixion by the Romans at Calvary c. 30 AD. It is the culmination of the Passion of Jesus. It is public Holiday in Vatican City as well as many other countries.

==== Urbi et Orbi ====
Urbi et Orbi (Latin: [ur.bi ˈet ˈor.bi]; lit. 'to the city [of Rome] and to the world') denotes a papal address and apostolic blessing given by the pope on certain solemn occasions. The Urbi et Orbi address and blessing is the most solemn form of blessing in the Catholic Church, and is reserved for the most solemn occasions. These occasions include Easter, Christmas, and the proclamation of a newly elected pope concluding a conclave.

The Christmas Urbi et Orbi address and blessing is given on Easter Sunday at 12:00 PM (Vatican Time) from the central loggia of Saint Peter's Basilica.

=== Easter Monday ===
Easter Monday is the second day of Eastertide and a public holiday in more than 50 predominantly Christian countries (Including Vatican City). It marks the second day of the Octave of Easter.

=== Anniversary of the Election of Pope Leo XIV ===
The Anniversary of the Election of Pope Leo XIV is a holiday in Vatican City that currently marks the Election of Pope Leo XIV on May 8, 2025.

=== Saint Joseph the Worker ===
In 1870 in response to the capture of Rome ending the Papal States, Pope Pius IX declared St. Joseph "Patron of the Universal Church" and instituted another feast, a solemnity to be held on the third Sunday of Eastertide. Pope Pius X, in order to restore the celebration of Sundays, moved this feast to the Wednesday in the second week after Easter, and gave it an octave. In 1955, Pope Pius XII introduced in its place the feast of Saint Joseph the Worker on 1 May in the General Roman Calendar as an ecclesiastical counterpart to the International Workers' Day on the same day. This reflects Saint Joseph's status as patron of workers. Pius XII established the feast both to honor Saint Joseph, and to make people aware of the dignity of human work.

=== Ascension Thursday ===
Solemnity of the Ascension of the Lord, commemorates the Christian belief of the bodily Ascension of Jesus into Heaven. Following the account of Acts 1:3 that the risen Jesus appeared for 40 days prior to his Ascension, Ascension Day is traditionally celebrated on a Thursday, the fortieth day of Easter according to inclusive counting.

=== Pentecost Sunday ===
Pentecost is a Christian holiday that takes place on the 49th day (50th day when inclusive counting is used) after Easter. It commemorates the descent of the Holy Spirit upon the Apostles of Jesus, Mary, and other followers of Christ, while they were in Jerusalem celebrating the Feast of Weeks, as described in the Acts of the Apostles (Acts 2:1–31). Pentecost marks the "Birthday of the Church".

== See also ==
- Liturgical year
- Easter in Italy
- Christmas in Vatican City
- Public holidays in Vatican City
- Index of Vatican City-related articles
