= Fogheraccia =

Bonfires for Saint Joseph's Day in Romagna, Italy, and San Marino

Fogheraccia di San Giuseppe
- Also called: Focarina di San Giuseppe; Fugaràza 'd San Jusèf; Fugaréna 'd San Jusèf
- Observed by: Romagna; Italy; San Marino
- Type: Cultural and agricultural
- Significance: Celebrating Saint Joseph's Day and the March equinox
- Celebrations: Bonfires, concerts
- Date: 18 March
- Next time: 18 March 2027
- Frequency: Annual
- Related to: Saint Joseph's Day

The Fogheraccia di San Giuseppe (Romagnol: fugaràza 'd San Jusèf, also fugaréna, fugaràcia, or fugaròina), also known as the Focarina, is an annual public bonfire lit on the evening of 18 March, the vigil of Saint Joseph's Day, in the historical region of Romagna, northern Italy, and San Marino.

The tradition is believed to be of Roman or Celtic origin. The bonfires, which are accompanied by music and food stands, are especially popular in Rimini, where they extend the length of the city's coastal conurbation from Cattolica to Cesenatico. Inland, the bonfires are sometimes anticipated in the similar tradition of Lòm a Merz (transl. Lights of March), held between late February and early March.

== Name ==
In Rimini, the bonfire is called fugaràza 'd San Jusèf in the Romagnol language; the variant fugaràcia is found further south and fugaròina further north. In the rest of Romagna, the bonfire is called fugaréna. The name derives from the upwind (al fugarèn) with which the bonfires are lit.

== Distribution and Lòm a Merz ==
The Riminese fugaràza extends the length of the city's coastal conurbation from Cattolica to Cesenatico. Bonfires are also lit across San Marino.

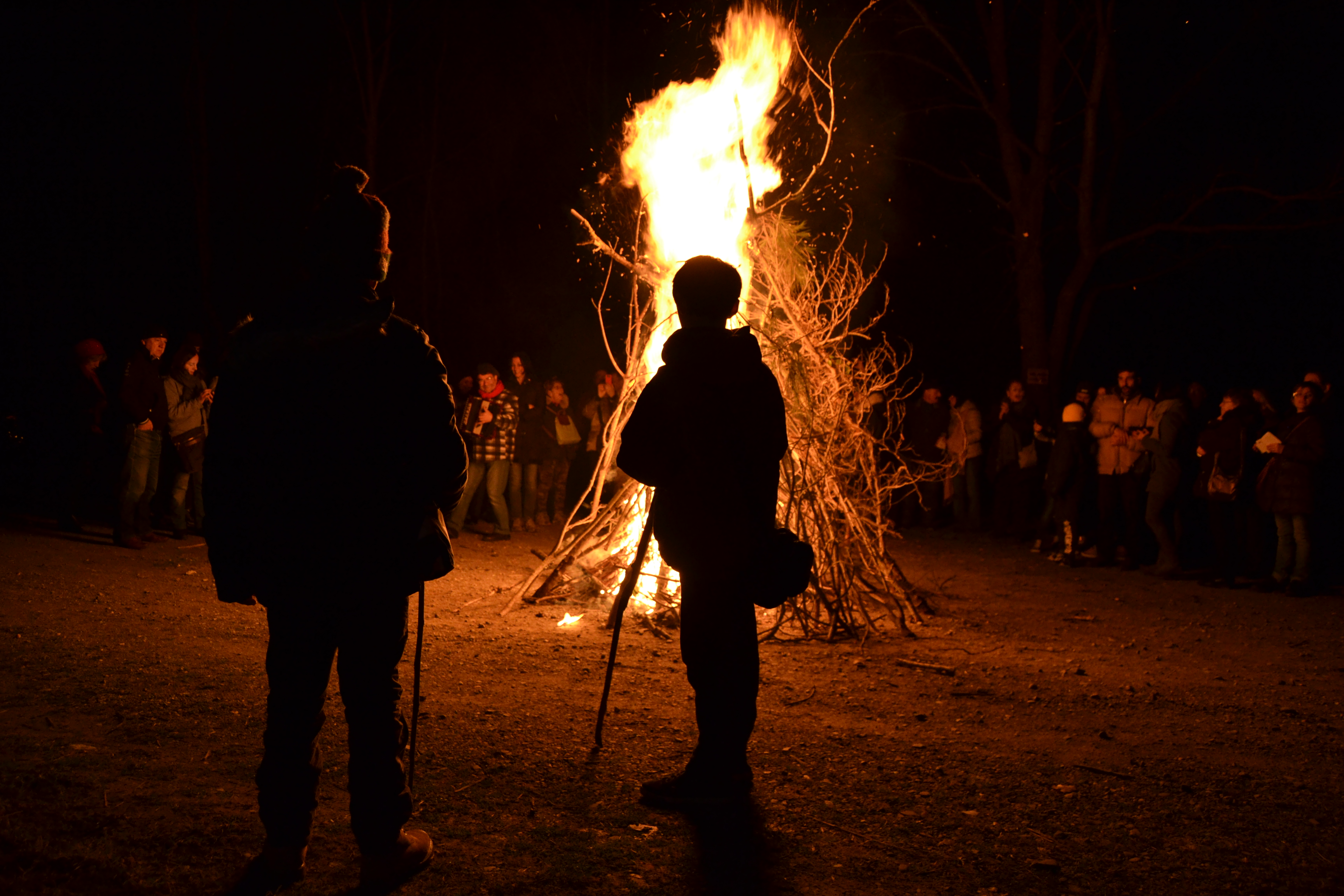
Participants around a bonfire at a Lòm a Merz, February 2015

While bonfires are also lit on 18 March outside of the coastal settlements, in some inland settlements, they are anticipated in the peasant tradition of Lòm a Merz (transl. Lights of March). Held in the last three days of February and the first three days of March, the festival also features bonfires and traditional music. According to a local superstition, on those six days, collectively known as the dé dla Canucéra, a mysterious and ominous influence could wreak havoc at an unknown and unpredictable hour, so that agricultural workers should abstain from work.

In some inland settlements, the bonfires intersect with the segavecchia, a mid-Lentern tradition in which an effigy of an old woman, who is stuffed with dried fruit, sugared almonds, or coins, is paraded, torn apart, and buried.

== History and customs ==
The fogheraccia likely derives from customs for the spring equinox. The event may be linked to the Celtic occupation of Romagna, and share cultural roots with the Celtic festival of Beltane. The bonfires may have been intended to warm the Sun after winter, or they may have been intended as a purification ritual for fire or agriculture. The Lòm a Merz especially coincides with the beginning of the early Roman calendar: the bonfires may have symbolised the start of the new year, and honoured Mars, the Roman god of agriculture, whose month was March, in preparation for the agricultural season.

Large bonfires would be erected in each village, while remote houses would construct their own smaller bonfires. In the 1950s, villages would compete to erect the highest and longest-lasting bonfire. In the countryside, the bonfires typically used stubble, pruned olive tree branches, and harvest waste, while in the coastal regions, the fires included wood washed ashore during the autumn and winter, locally known as the almadìra. Old furniture and wood scraps would then be added to the fire. Combustible materials would sometimes be stolen from construction sites and homes. During the lighting of bonfires, fishermen would sing a nursery rhyme relating the fogheraccia to the Feast of the Annunciation on 25 March:

Fogheraccia, fogheraccia, Saint Joseph is made happy,
and the Madonna is raised.

Villagers would commonly visit other local bonfires after staying some time with their own. Once the fire was extinguished, heifers and adolescent girls walked over the bonfire's smoking embers to encourage them to breastfeed.

In contemporary celebrations, the bonfires are accompanied by cultural celebrations, including traditional music and food stands selling piada, doughnuts, and wine. The exact date of the celebration is liable to postponement due to bad weather.

== Outside Romagna ==
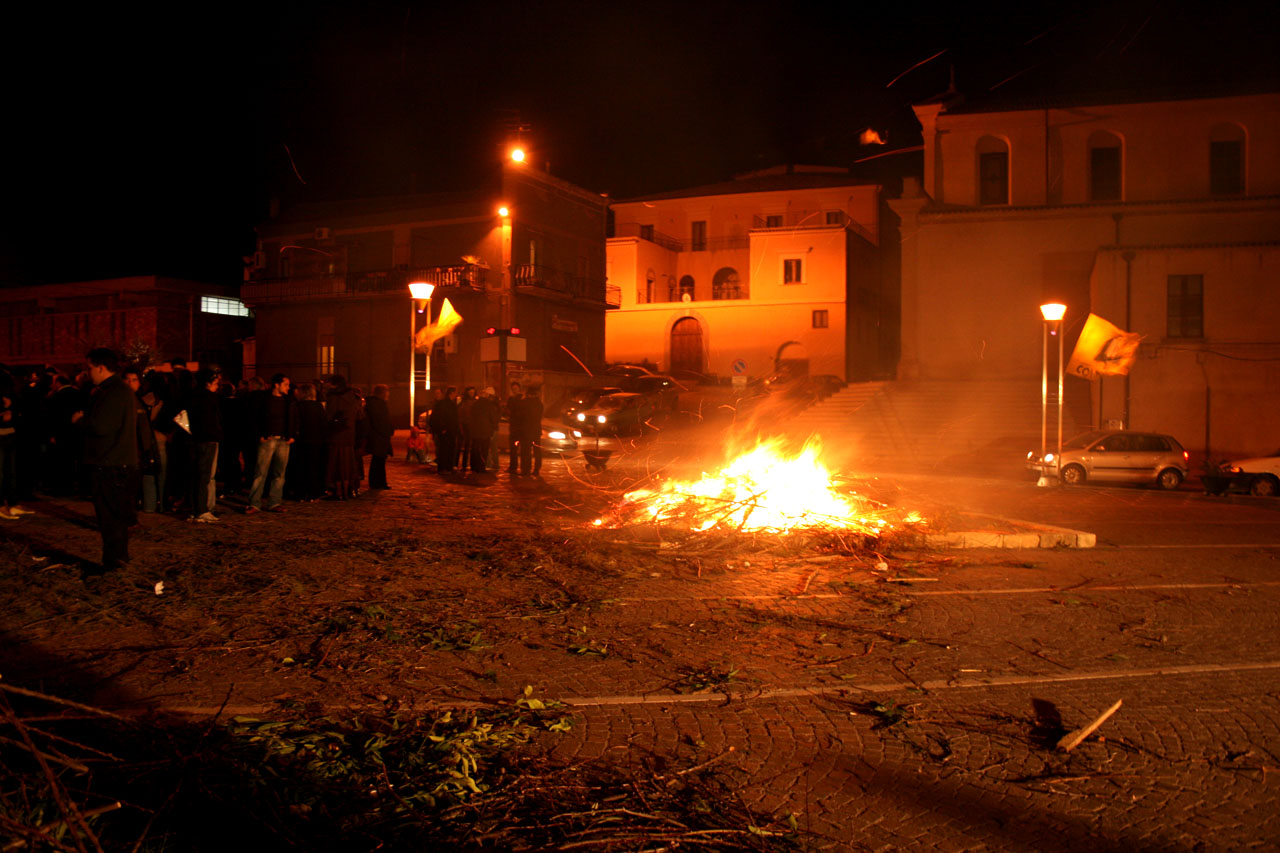
A bonfire on Saint Joseph's Day in 2007 in Tursi, Basilicata

Bonfires are lit for Saint Joseph's Day in several places in Italy outside Romagna, such as in Bobbio, Emilia-Romagna, on which an effigy of an old woman is also burned; in Matera, Basilicata; in the Val Trebbia, where the bonfire is known as fuiè ad San Giusèp; and in Serracapriola, Apulia, where the bonfire is known as ù féòn. Zeppole are traditionally fried on the bonfires in Itri, Lazio.

== In popular culture ==
A fogheraccia features in the opening scenes of Federico Fellini's 1973 film Amarcord. Depicting a moment in shared village life, a segavecchia is set alight at the top of the fire, with the words: "And with this fire, my old lady, the winter and frost takes you away."

== See also ==
- Kupala Night – an Eastern Slavic festival featuring bonfires on Saint John's Eve
- List of Celtic festivals
- Scheibenschlagen – a Central European Lenten festival featuring bonfires
- Walpurgis Night – a Christian festival in Northern and Central Europe featuring bonfires in late April
