= U cumbitu =

Traditional Calabrian meal for Saint Joseph's Day

U cumbitu 'i San Giuseppi (lit. 'Saint Joseph's banquet'), also known as u mmitu 'e San Giuseppe, or u banquettu around Catanzaro, is a custom in the Calabria region, southern Italy, in which lagane e ceci, a pasta dish containing chickpeas, is shared among families and neighbours on Saint Joseph's Day (19 March).

== History ==
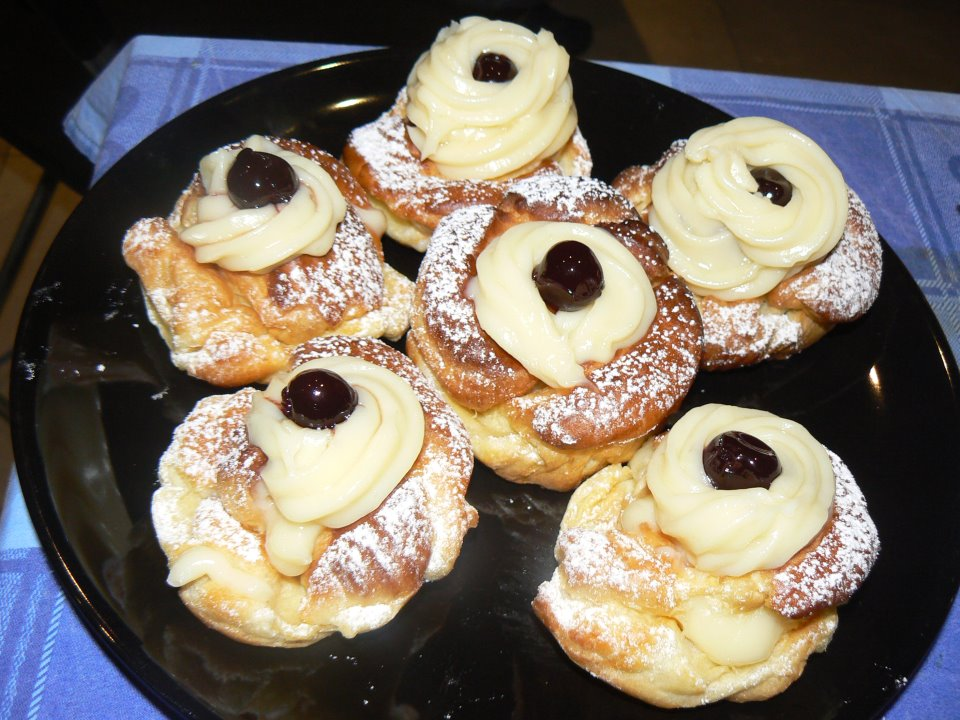
Zeppole are a dessert associated with Saint Joseph's Day across southern Italy.

U cumbitu may have emerged in the 20th century, or have origins in Calabria's medieval feudal society. On Saint Joseph's Day, rich families invited poorer people from their neighbourhood for a feast at their house. Some of the guests would dress as the Holy Family, sometimes extended to include Joachim and Anne, Mary's parents. The hostess would kiss guests' hands in an act of reverence. Lagane e ceci was served as the first dish, followed by pan-fried cod and zeppole, the dessert typically associated with Saint Joseph in Calabria. The meal would take place in silence. After the meal, guests would be given leftovers to take home to their relatives.

Alternatively, beggars would walk the streets with a pan in their hands, clinking their spoons against the pan to warn almsgivers that they were arriving. Reaching the house of someone reasonably well-off, they would hide their faces and receive a vuccata 'i San Giuseppi (transl. Saint Joseph's morsel), consisting of the pasta, cod, and sometimes dried figs. Around Crotone, it was also common to donate loaves of bread to passers-by.

U cumbitu notably suspended class structures in Calabria, which was particularly afflicted by poverty and hunger, and was a symbol of social solidarity and fraternity.

== Contemporary celebrations ==
Today, parishes and neighbourhoods in Calabria organise u cumbitu get-togethers, in which families exchange food that is blessed by the parish priest. Elsewhere, families bring the dish to their neighbours, friends, and relatives. The custom is popular among Calabrian emigrant communities, such as in Cinisello Balsamo, Lombardy, where a Calabrian cultural association has organised an annual u cumbitu since the 2010s. While the pasta was traditionally cooked in terracotta pignatta pots by a fireplace, or prepared in pots in village alleys and squares, from which anyone could help themselves to a portion, the pasta is now typically cooked on gas stoves.

== Preparation ==
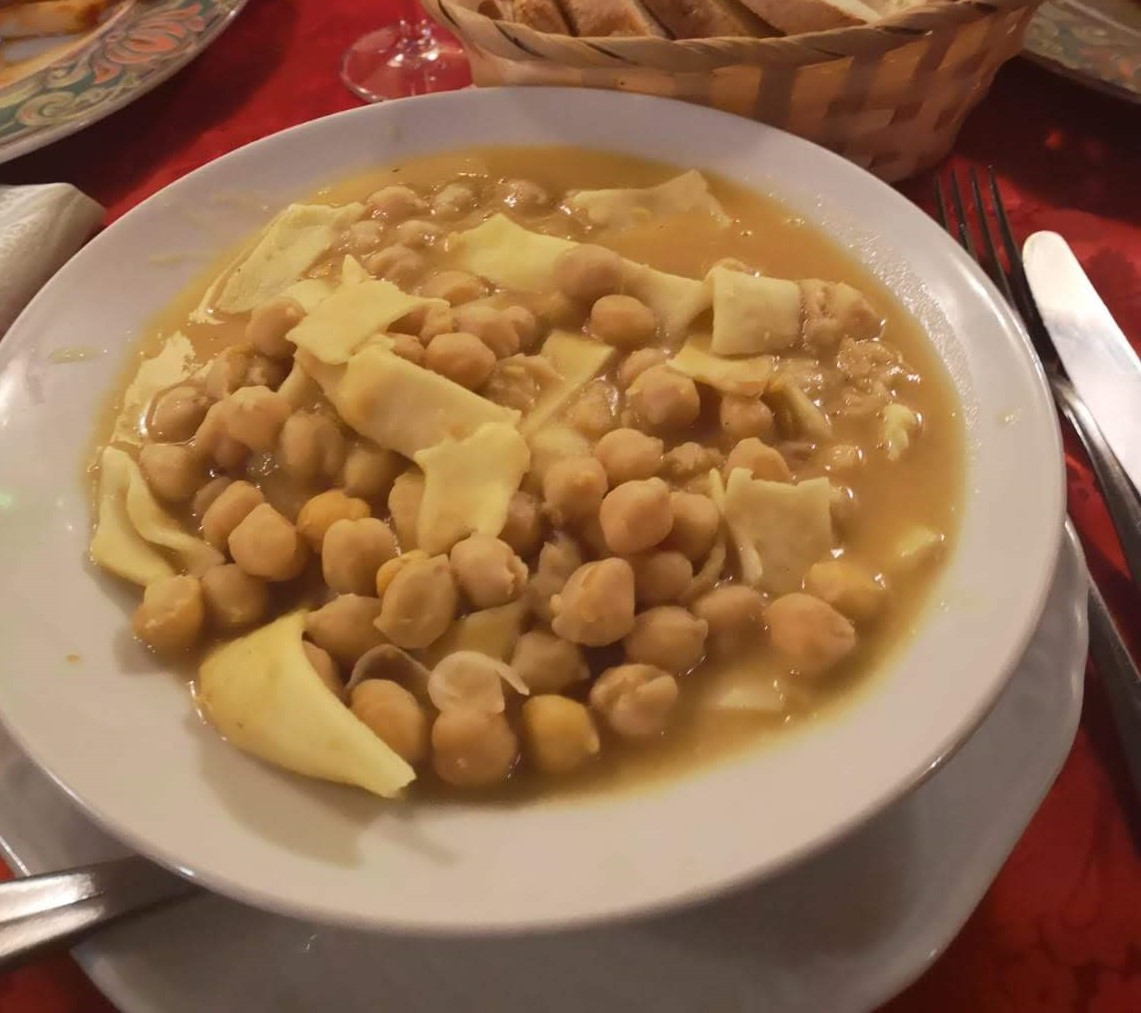
A plate of lagane e ceci typical of Cosenza

Before u cumbitu, figs, zucchini, and peppers are sun-dried. Closer to Saint Joseph's Day, bread is prepared in a wood-fired oven, and chicory and fennel are harvested, while scarola and cabbages are picked. Cod and dried chickpeas are soaked together overnight before the feast.

The pasta traditionally used for the meal is lagane e ceci. On the day of the meal, the pasta is rolled out, dried, then rolled up on itself and cut into strips. The pasta is cooked for two to three minutes, then mixed with the chickpeas. The meal is served with bread and wine. Other dishes associated with u cumbitu include bean, lentil, chickpea, or Indian pea soup.
