= Lagane e ceci =

Italian pasta dish

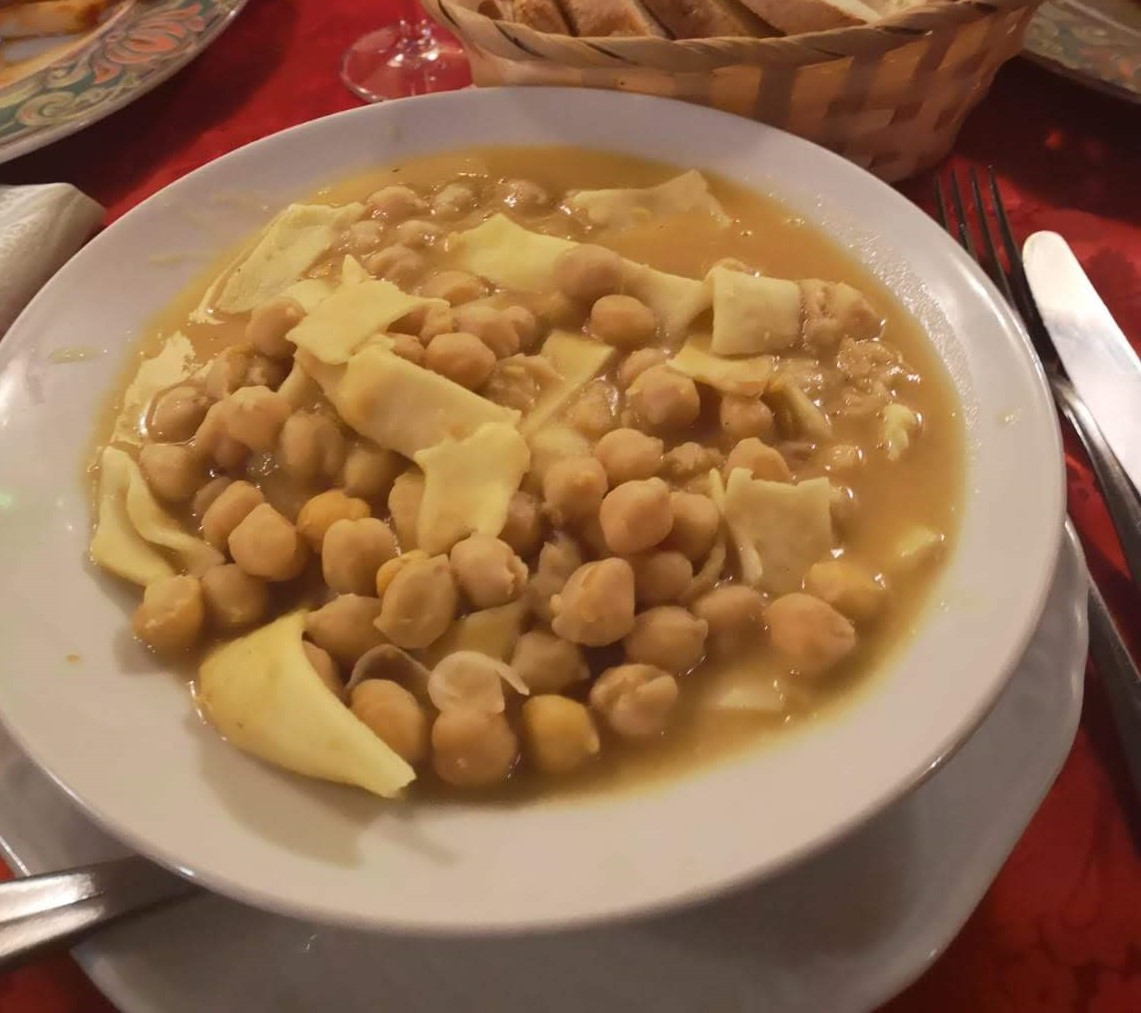
- Alternative names: Lagane e cicciari
- Course: Primo (Italian course)
- Place of origin: Italy
- Region or state: Calabria
- Main ingredients: Lagane, chickpeas, garlic, olive oil

Lagane e ceci or lagane e cicciari, also known as pasta del brigante (lit. 'brigand's pasta'), is a pasta dish originating in the Calabria region of Italy. It consists of lagane, a wide pasta, with chickpeas, garlic, and oil.

The dish is associated with the custom of u cumbitu, in which the dish is shared among families and neighbours annually on Saint Joseph's Day (19 March), alongside pan-fried cod and zeppole, the dessert typically associated with Saint Joseph in Calabria. The custom may have emerged in the 20th century, or have origins in Calabria's medieval feudal society. U cumbitu notably suspended class structures in Calabria, which was particularly afflicted by poverty and hunger, and was a symbol of social solidarity and fraternity.

== See also ==
- List of pasta
- List of pasta dishes
