= Christmas in Vatican City =

Christmas celebrations and traditions in Vatican City

Advent and Christmas Season
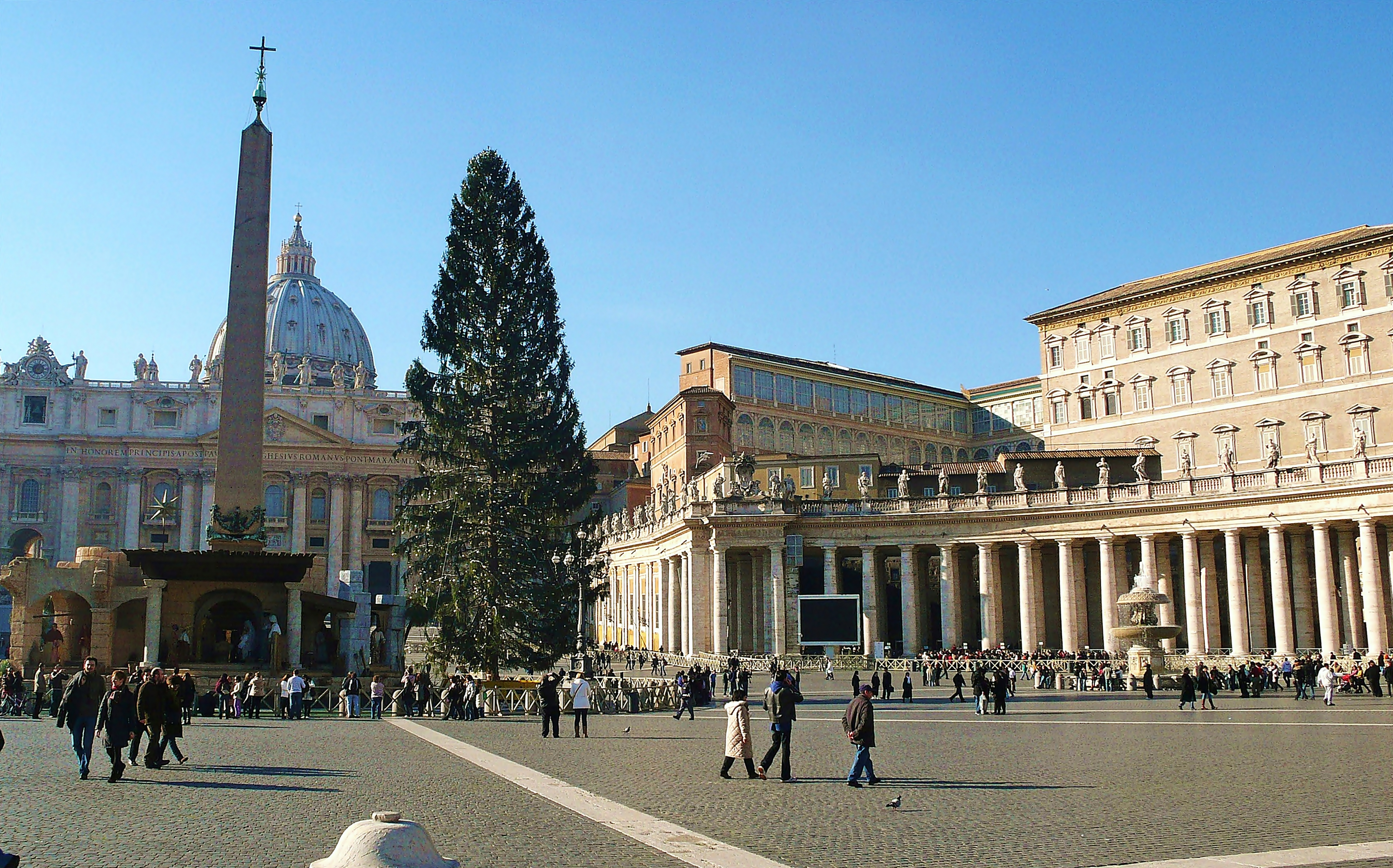
- Exterior of the Basilica of St. Peter 2011
- Observed by: Vatican City State
- Celebrations: Feast of the Immaculate Conception; Gaudete Sunday; Christmas; Christmas Midnight Mass; Christmas Urbi et Orbi; Octave of Christmas; Saint Stephen's Day; Feast of the Holy Innocents; Feast of the Holy Family; Solemnity of Mary, Mother of God; Feast of the Epiphany; Feast of the Baptism of the Lord
- Begins: Advent: First Sunday of Advent; Christmas: Christmas Eve
- Ends: Advent: Christmas Eve; Christmas: Feast of the Baptism of the Lord
- 2025 date: Advent: 30 November – 24 December; Christmas: 24 December – 11 January
- 2026 date: Advent: 29 November – 24 December; Christmas: 24 December – 10 January
- 2027 date: Advent: 28 November – 24 December; Christmas: 24 December – 09 January
- 2028 date: Advent: 03 December – 24 December; Christmas: 24 December – 07 January
- Duration: Advent: 22–28 days Christmas: 14–20 days
- Frequency: Annual

Christmas in Vatican City (Italian: Natale, Latin: Natalis Domini) officially begins in Vatican City on 24 December, with Christmas Eve, and ends on the Feast of the Baptism of the Lord. Christmas is a festival commemorating the birth of Jesus Christ, observed on December 25 as a feast central to Christianity. Preceding Christmas Season in Vatican City is the season of Advent. The Advent and Christmas seasons include the following Public holidays in Vatican City:

- Feast of the Immaculate Conception (8 December)
- Christmas Day (25 December)
- Saint Stephen's Day (26 December)
- Solemnity of Mary, Mother of God (1 January)
- Epiphany (6 January)

== Advent Season ==
Advent begins on the First Sunday of Advent and ends on Christmas Eve.

Advent signifies preparation for a threefold coming of Christ: firstly in the Incarnation at Bethlehem, then in a perpetual sacramental presence in the Eucharist, and thirdly at his Second Coming and final judgement. Furthermore, Advent is a time to focus on his present coming to mankind in the Word and Sacraments.

=== Solemnity of the Immaculate Conception ===
The Solemnity of the Immaculate Conception celebrates the Immaculate Conception of the Blessed Virgin Mary, on 8 December, nine months before the feast of the Nativity of Mary on 8 September. It is Public Holiday in Vatican City. Since 1953, the Pope visits the Column of the Immaculate Conception in the Piazza di Spagna to offer expiatory prayers commemorating the solemn event.

== Vatican Christmas Tree and Nativity Scene ==
The Vatican Christmas Tree is mounted (Until the end of the Christmas Season) in St. Peter's Square sometime around the 8 December.

The tradition of placing a Christmas tree and a life-size Nativity scene in Saint Peter's Square started in 1982 during the pontificate of Pope John Paul II, when the Polish-born Pope introduced the Northern European tradition of the Christmas Tree to the Vatican. Though the tradition of erecting a Christmas Tree was celebrated in northern and central Europe, such as in Poland, Pope John Paul II's country of origin, it was not yet celebrated in the Vatican. The tradition of the nativity scene comes from Italy. One of the earliest representation in art of the nativity was found in the early Christian Roman catacomb of Saint Valentine. The first seasonal nativity scene, which seems to have been a dramatic rather than sculptural rendition, is attributed to Saint Francis of Assisi (died 1226).

== Christmas Season ==
Christmastide begins on Christmas Eve and ends on Feast of the Baptism of the Lord.

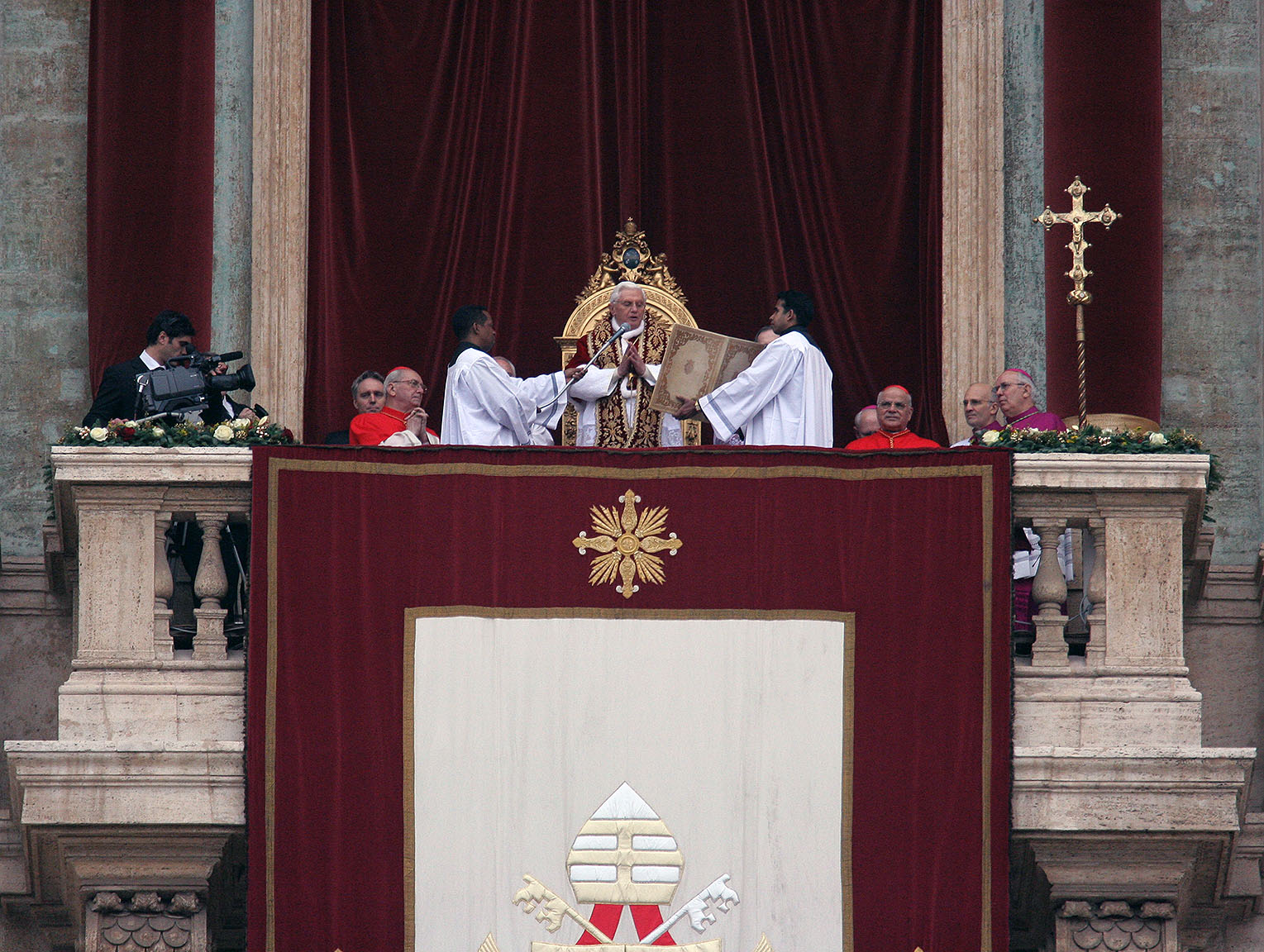
2008 Christmas Day Urbi et Orbi by Pope Benedict XVI, Saint Peter's Square, Vatican City.

=== Christmas Day ===
Christmas Day celebrated on 25 December is a Public Holiday in Vatican City. The English word Christmas is a shortened form of 'Christ's Mass'.

==== Midnight Mass ====
Roman Catholics have traditionally celebrated Midnight Mass with church services beginning at midnight, although the Mass itself is officially called Missa in nocte (Ad Missam in nocte) or Mass during the Night in English.

==== Urbi et Orbi ====
Urbi et Orbi (Latin: [ur.bi ˈet ˈor.bi]; lit. 'to the city [of Rome] and to the world') denotes a papal address and apostolic blessing given by the pope on certain solemn occasions. The Urbi et Orbi address and blessing is the most solemn form of blessing in the Catholic Church, and is reserved for the most solemn occasions. These occasions include Easter, Christmas, and the proclamation of a newly elected pope concluding a conclave.

The Christmas Urbi et Orbi address and blessing is given on Christmas Day at 12:00 PM (Vatican Time) from the central loggia of Saint Peter's Basilica.

=== Saint Stephen's Day ===
Feast of Saint Stephen, is a Christian saint's day to commemorate Saint Stephen, the first Christian martyr or protomartyr, celebrated on 26 December and is a Public Holiday in Vatican City.

=== New Year's Eve Vespers and Te Deum ===
Traditionally, the Holy Father concludes the year by presiding at the Te Deum and First Vespers for the Solemnity of Mary, Mother of God in the evening of New Year's Eve. It has long been a custom in Catholic churches to sing the Te Deum, the hymn of thanksgiving par excellence, on New Year's Eve, to thank God for all of the blessings received over the course of the previous year, and then to invoke His blessings for the coming year.

=== Solemnity of Mary, Mother of God ===
The Solemnity of Mary, the Holy Mother of God is a feast day of the Blessed Virgin Mary under the aspect of her motherhood of Jesus Christ. This solemnity is celebrated on New Year's Day, 1 January and is a Public Holiday in Vatican City.

=== Epiphany ===
Epiphany, is a Christian feast day commemorating the visit of the Magi, the baptism of Jesus, and the wedding at Cana. Celebrated on 6 January and is a Public Holiday in Vatican City. In the Roman Catholic Church, the feast commemorates principally (but not solely) the visit of the Magi to the Christ Child, and thus Jesus Christ's physical manifestation to the Gentiles.

== 100 Presepi in Vaticano ==
The international exhibition 100 Presepi in Vaticano (100 Nativity Scenes in the Vatican) is an annual holiday display hosted under the left arm of Bernini's Colonnade in St. Peter's Square. Organized by the Dicastery for Evangelization, the event features over 100 handcrafted cribs and nativity works created by artists, craftspeople, schools, and international embassies from around the globe. The exhibition typically runs from December 8 through January 8 each year.

== See also ==
- Liturgical year
- Christmas in Italy
- Easter in Vatican City
- Public holidays in Vatican City
- Index of Vatican City-related articles
