= Vatican Christmas Tree =

Decorated tree erected annually in Saint Peter's Square

Coordinates: 41.902°N 12.455°E

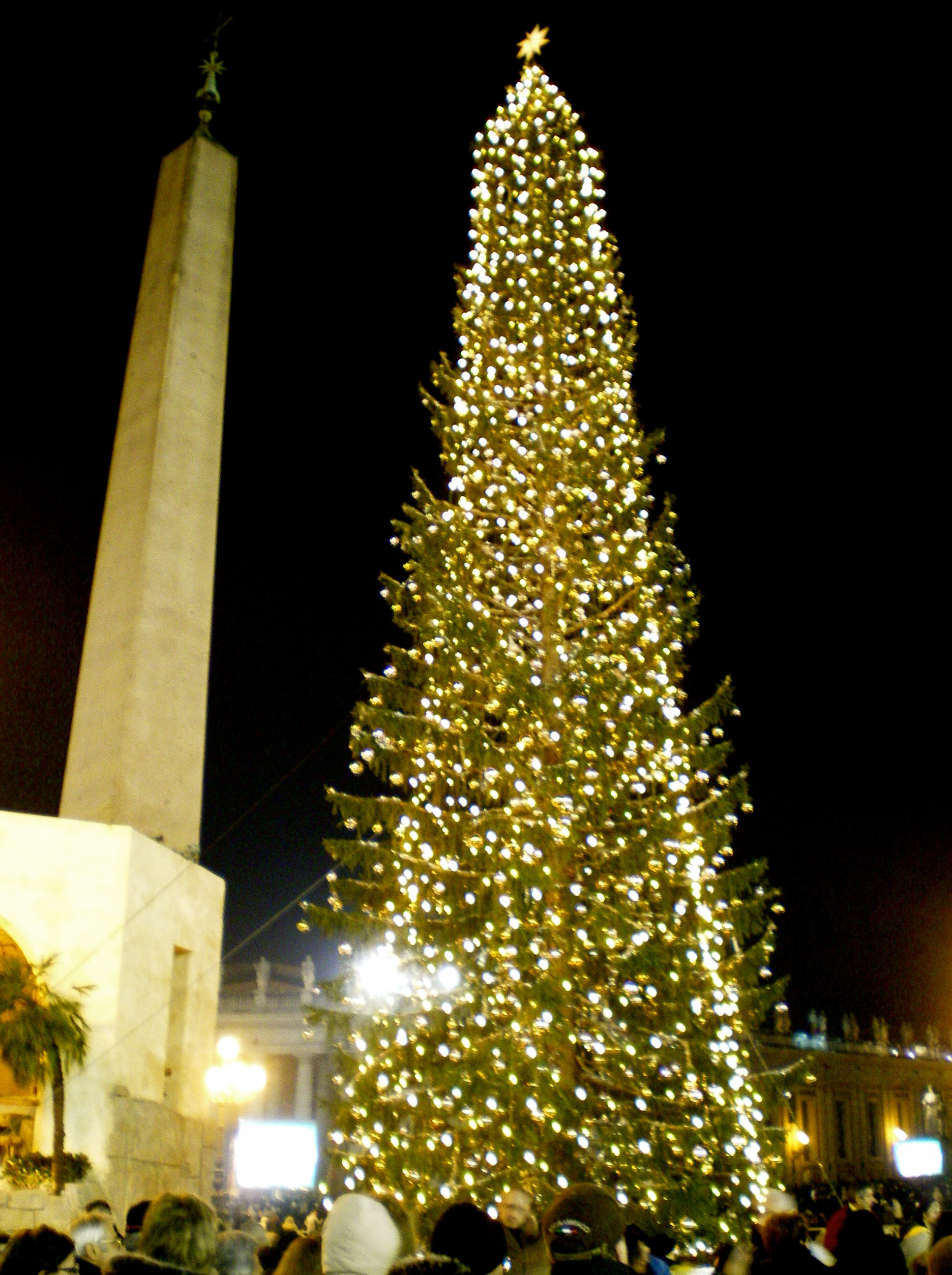
Vatican Christmas Tree. Christmas Day 2007.

The Vatican Christmas Tree, also called the Saint Peter's Square Christmas Tree, is the decorated tree that is erected annually in the Saint Peter's Square directly in front of St. Peter's Basilica in the Vatican City to celebrate the Christmas holiday season.

The tradition of placing a Christmas tree and a life-size Nativity scene in Saint Peter's Square started in 1982 during the pontificate of Pope John Paul II, when the Polish-born Pope introduced the Northern European tradition of the Christmas Tree to the Vatican. Though the tradition of erecting a Christmas Tree was celebrated in northern and central Europe, such as in Poland, Pope John Paul II's country of origin, it was not yet celebrated in the Vatican.

The first tree came from Italy. Since then, the offering of the Christmas Tree to the Pope has become an honour, and each year the Vatican accepts a tree donated by a different European country or region.

The Christmas tree is installed in the centre of Saint Peter's Square, together with a life-size nativity scene that is unveiled on Christmas Eve. The nativity scene has seventeen life-size statues. Of these, nine are the original figures donated in 1842 by Saint Vincent Pallotti for the nativity scene at the Roman church of Sant'Andrea della Valle, and the other eight figures were added later on. In 2006 the Italian province of Trentino, and the local council of a village of Tesero, provided a further thirteen sculpted wooden figures and animals, as well as household utensils for the depiction of daily life.

== Trees ==
Year	Species	Height	Location grown at	Notes
2026	Silver Fir	24 metres (79 ft)	Pollino National Park, Basilicata, Italy	The tree will be decorated with more than 50,000 LED lights and ornaments made by children taking part in therapeutic ceramics workshops in Italian hospitals. Children receiving inpatient cancer care will switch on the lights at the ceremony on December 7 at 5:30 PM Rome time.
2025	European spruce	25 metres (82 ft)	Lagundo and Ultimo, South Tyrol, Italy	Officially lit on December 15, 2025, alongside a life-size Nativity scene.
2024	Red spruce	29 metres (95 ft)	Ledro, Trentino, Italy	Unveiled on December 7, 2024.
2023	White spruce	25 metres (82 ft)	Alps mountains, Italy	Unveiled on December 9, 2023. Decorated with edelweiss.
2022	White fir	30 metres (98 ft)	Rosello, Italy	Unveiled on December 3, 2022.
2021	Picea abies	28 metres (92 ft)	Andalo, Italy	On Friday, December 10, the lighting of the tree took place along with the inauguration of the Nativity scene. The Vatican Governorate used sustainable low-energy LED lighting, as has been custom in the past years. Weighing eight tons, the tree was from a sustainable forestry management project in the northern Italian region of Trentino, and was a gift to the Vatican from the Trentino Delegation along with 600 wooden decorations handcrafted by Andalo artisans.
2020	Spruce	30 metres (98 ft)	Kočevje, Slovenia	The tree was 75 years old, weighed 7 tonnes and had a volume of 5.33 m³.
2019	Spruce	26 metres (85 ft)	Veneto, Italy	
2018	Spruce	23 metres (75 ft)	Pordenone, Italy	
2017	Spruce	21 metres (69 ft)	Gołdap, Poland	
2016	Spruce	25 metres (82 ft)	Trento, Italy	The tree was illuminated by 18,000 LED lights and decorated with the ceramic ornaments, made by children in hospitals across Italy who are receiving treatment for cancer and other illnesses. The Christmas tree and the Nativity scene was lit on December 9.
2015	Spruce	25 metres (82 ft)	Ehenfeld bei Hirschau, Oberpfalz, Bavaria, Germany	
2014	Fir	25 metres (82 ft)	Calabria, Italy	
2013	Fir	25 metres (82 ft)	Waldmünchen, Bavaria, Germany	This would be the second time this region donated a Christmas Tree, last being in 1984.
2012	Silver Fir	30 metres (98 ft)	Pescopennataro, Italy	
2011	Spruce	30 metres (98 ft)	Zakarpattia Oblast, Ukraine	The tree was a gift from Ukraine, a spruce from the Zakarpattia Oblast, 30.5 meters high and with a trunk of 56 centimeters. It had more than 700 branches, which were decorated with 2,500 silver- and gold-colored baubles illuminated by white and yellow lights. It was raised on December 5 and inaugurated on December 16 in the presence of bishops from the Ukrainian Orthodox Church.
2010	Spruce	33.5 metres (110 ft)	Bolzano, South Tyrol, Italy	94 years old tree. The tree came from a PEFC certified, sustainable managed forest surrounding Lüsen in South Tyrol, northern Italy. It was lit in the presence of Pope Benedict XVI on 17 December.
2009	Norway Spruce	30 metres (98 ft)	Ardennes forests near Spa, Wallonia, Belgium	The tree was 90 years old, more than 30 meters high, weighed 14 tons, with a trunk circumference of 2.65 metres, and branches at the bottom spread out 8 metres The giant tree came from a PEFC certified, sustainably managed Ardennes forests in the Belgian region of Wallonia near the town of Spa. It was decorated with 2,000 gold and silver colored bulbs and 1,500 lights. The lights were turned on by two children from Belgium during the opening ceremony held on 18 December 2009. The tree was adorned with white and gold ornaments. The Belgian town of Spa also donated 40 small fir trees to decorate the halls and rooms of the Vatican City.
2008	Norway spruce	33 metres (108 ft)	Municipality of Gutenstein, Lower Austria, Austria	120 years old tree. The Christmas Tree, which was 33 metres high and 120 years old, was donated by Austria.
2007	Fir	30 metres (98 ft)	Val Badia, in the Dolomites mountains, Italy	
2006	Fir	33.5 metres (110 ft)	Taverna, Calabria, Italy	
2005	Fir	33 metres (108 ft)	Afiesl, Upper Austria, Austria	The Christmas tree was donated by a group of Austrian pilgrims from the town of Afiesl, which is located in a province of Upper Austria. They also donated 32 small trees to decorate the papal apartments.
2004	Fir	32.5 metres (107 ft)	Pinzolo, Trento region, Alps mountains, Italy	A 100-year-old, 105-foot-tall Christmas tree brought down from the Italian Alps
2003	Spruce	32 metres (105 ft)	Pré-Saint-Didier, Valle D’Aosta, Italy	A 98-foot-tall, 110-year-old spruce tree from the northern Italian region of Valle D'Aosta The Christmas tree, along with twenty other smaller ones that have been placed in and around the Vatican, were the gifts of the northern Italian region of Valle D'Aosta to the Pope for Christmas 2003. Pope John Paul II spent seven summer vacations in Valle D'Aosta, and one large Alpine mountain on the border with France has been named after him. The tree was symbolically presented to the Pope by three hundred people from Valle D’Aosta, including the governor of the region, at the general audience.
2002	Fir	28 metres (92 ft)	Gorski kotar, Croatia	
2001			Transylvania, Romania	The Christmas tree came from Romania, with President Ion Iliescu present during the lighting ceremony.
2000			Carinthia, Austria	
1999			Moravka, Czech Republic	
1998			Schwarzwald, Germany	
1997			Zakopane, Tatra Mountains, Poland	Tree came from the garden of the Centrum Formacyjno-Szkoleniowe „Księżówka” w Zakopanem.
1996			Kočevje, Slovenia	
1995			Obertraubling, Regensburg, Germany	
1994			Žilina, Slovakia	
1993			Graz-Seckau, Styria, Austria	
1992			South Tyrol, Italy	
1991			Vorarlberg, Austria	
1990			Ponte di Legno, Brescia, Italy	
1989			Schärding, Upper Austria, Austria	
1988			Cadore, Italy	
1987			Carinthia, Austria	
1986			Toblach, South Tyrol, Italy	
1985			South Tyrol, Italy	
1984			Waldmünchen, Bavaria, Germany	
1983			Tyrol, Austria	
1982	Fir		Alban Hills, Italy	

== See also ==
- Christmas in Vatican City
- Index of Vatican City-related articles
- List of individual trees
