= Public holidays in Vatican City =

The following days are public holidays in Vatican City, as published each year by the Prefecture of the Pontifical Household. These largely correspond to events in the liturgical year of the Catholic Church.

Date	English name	Italian name	Remarks
1 January	Solemnity of Mary, Mother of God	Maria Santissima Madre di Dio	Also the octave day of Christmas, and civil New Year’s Day.
6 January	Epiphany	Epifania del Signore	
11 February	Lateran Treaty Day	Anniversario della istituzione dello Stato della Città del Vaticano	Commemorates the 1929 signing of the Lateran Treaty, which established Vatican City as a sovereign state.
19 March	Saint Joseph's Day	San Giuseppe	
Varies annually	Easter Sunday	Pasqua	Moveable feast. Main article: Easter in Vatican City
Monday after Easter	Easter Monday	Lunedì dell'Angelo	Moveable feast, depending on Easter.
1 May	Saint Joseph the Worker	San Giuseppe lavoratore	
8 May	Anniversary of the Election of Pope Leo XIV	Anniversario dell'Elezione del Santo Padre	Varies with each reigning pope. Currently marks the Election of Pope Leo XIV on May 8, 2025.
29 June	Saints Peter and Paul	Santi Pietro e Paolo	Celebrates their co-patronage of Rome.
15 August	Assumption Day	Assunzione di Maria in Cielo	
17 September	Feast Day of Saint Robert Bellarmine	Onomastico del Santo Padre	Varies with each reigning pope. Currently the name day of Pope Leo XIV (born Robert Francis Prevost).
1 November	All Saints' Day	Tutti i santi, Ognissanti	
8 December	Immaculate Conception	Immacolata Concezione	
25 December	Christmas Day	Natale	Main article: Christmas in Vatican City
26 December	Saint Stephen's Day	Santo Stefano	

In addition, all Sundays of the year are public holidays.

By tradition, both the election anniversary and the name day for the birth name of the reigning pope are public holidays. The Solemnities of the Ascension and Corpus Christi (both moveable feasts dependent on Easter) have not been listed since 2009.

== See also ==
- Easter in Vatican City
- Christmas in Vatican City
- Index of Vatican City-related articles
