= Zippula =

Fried dough made to a recipe from Calabria, Italy

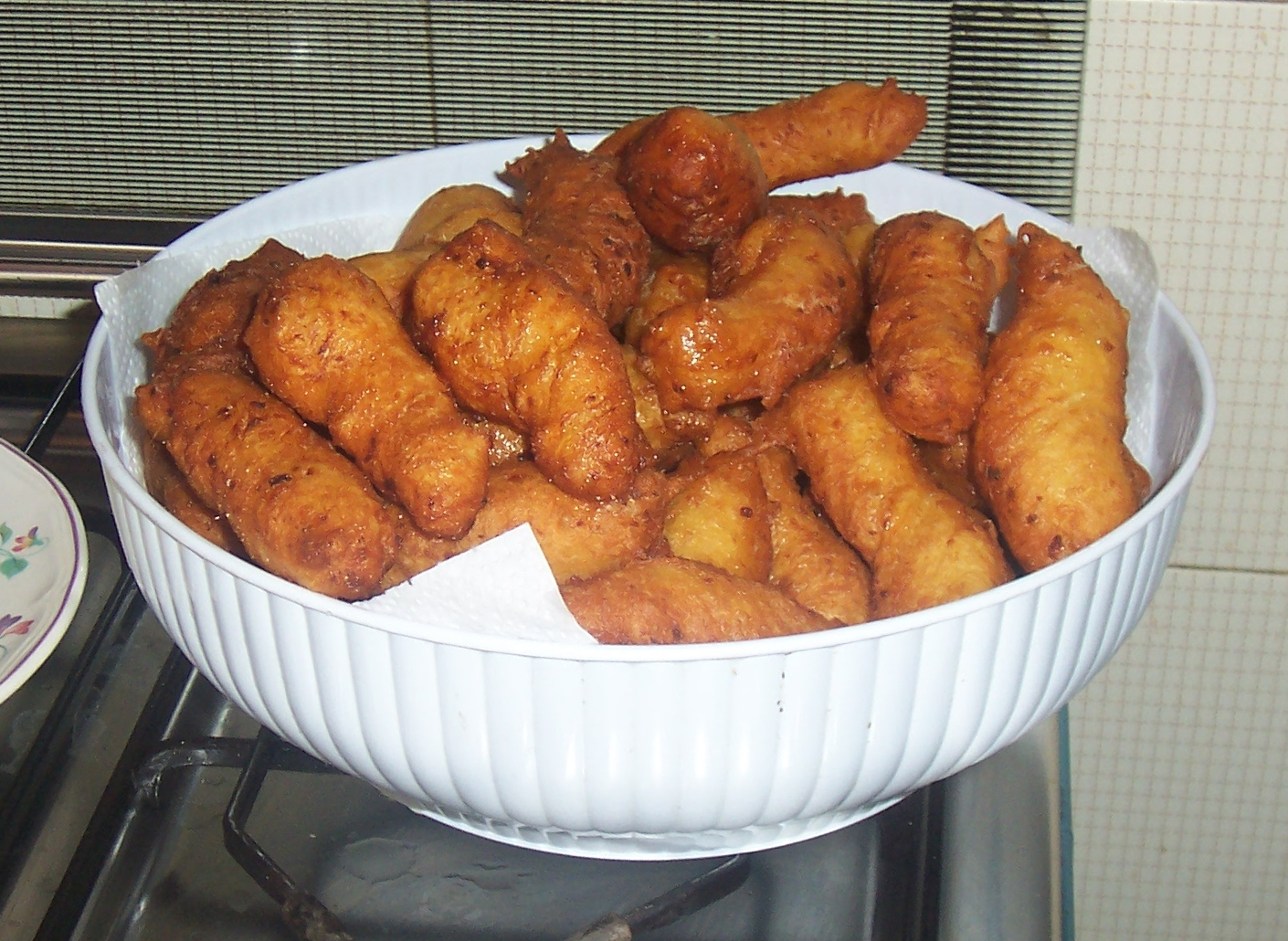
- Place of origin: Italy
- Region or state: Calabria
- Main ingredients: Flour, potatoes

Zippula (pl.: zippuli; Italian: zeppola or zeppola calabrese) is a fried dough made to a recipe from Calabria, Italy. Zippula is made with flour, water, yeast, boiled potatoes, and a pinch of salt. There are many variations: often anchovies are added, but salt cod, stockfish, cheese, sun-dried tomatoes, olives or 'nduja may also be added.

== See also ==
- List of fried dough foods
- List of doughnut varieties
- Pettole
- Zeppola
