= Kämpfelbach =

German municipality

- Municipality
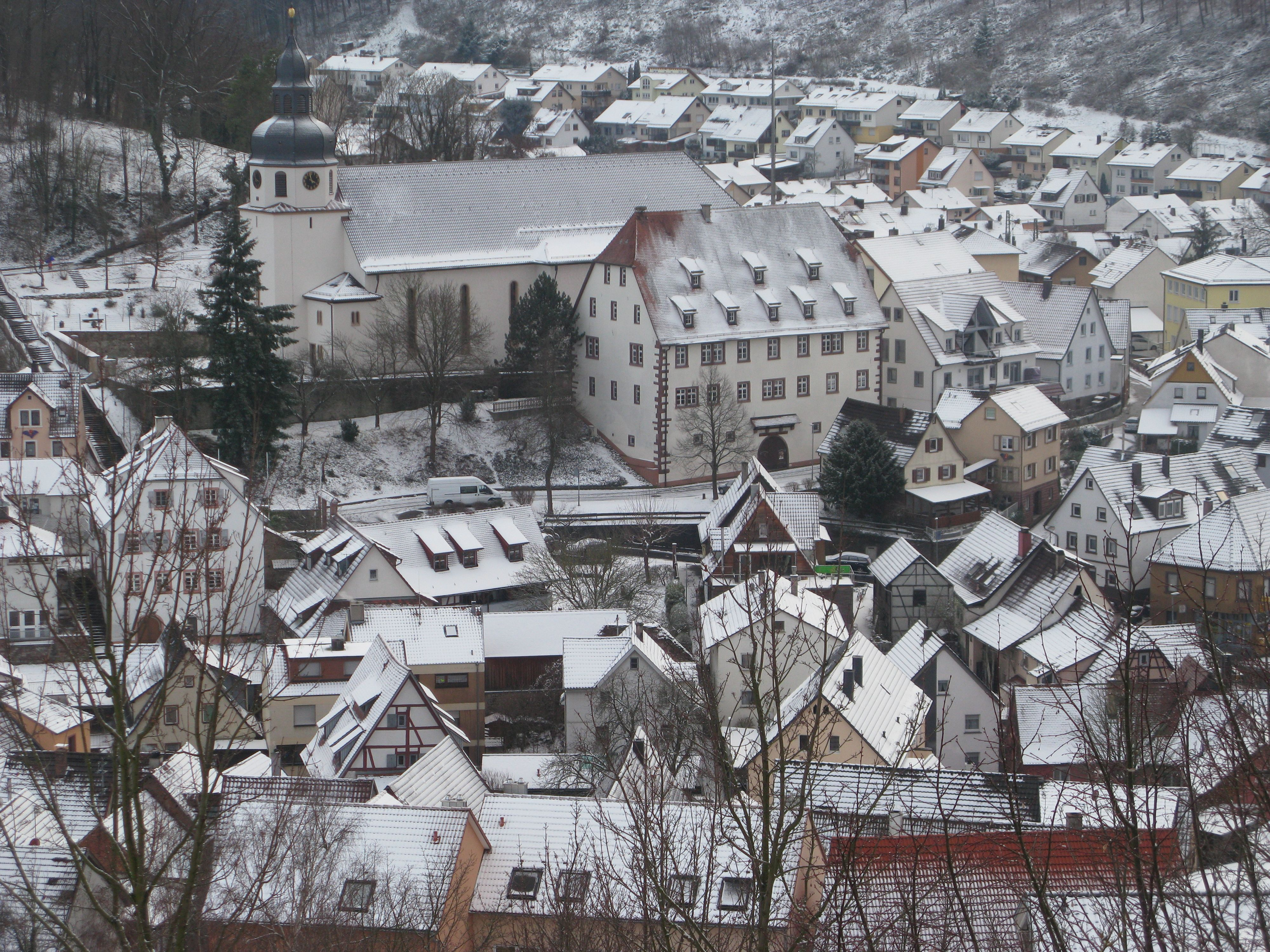
- Town center

- Coat of arms

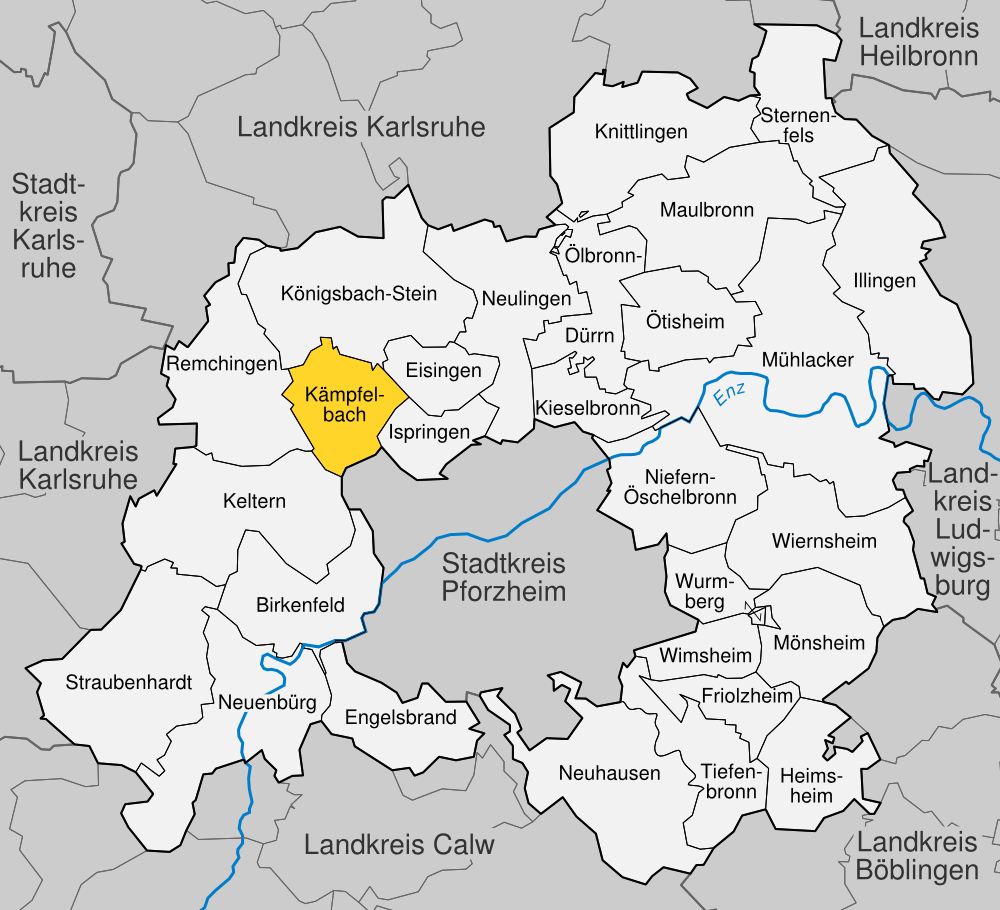
- Location of Kämpfelbach within Enzkreis district
- Interactive map of Kämpfelbach
- Location within Germany Location within Baden-Württemberg
- Coordinates: 48°56′53″N 08°37′26″E
- Country: Germany
- State: Baden-Württemberg
- Admin. region: Karlsruhe
- District: Enzkreis

Government
  - Mayor (2022–30): Thomas Maag

Area
  - Total: 13.64 km^{2} (5.27 sq mi)
- Elevation: 250 m (820 ft)

Population (2025-12-31)
  - Total: 6,252
  - Density: 458.4/km^{2} (1,187/sq mi)
- Time zone: UTC+01:00 (CET)
  - Summer (DST): UTC+02:00 (CEST)
- Postal codes: 75236
- Dialling codes: 07231 Ersingen 07232 Bilfingen
- Vehicle registration: PF
- Website: www.kaempfelbach.de

Kämpfelbach is a municipality in the district of Enz in Baden-Württemberg in Germany, 7 km away from the town of Pforzheim.

== Geography ==
The municipality of Kämpfelbach is located in the transition area between the Kraichgau and the northern Black Forest. This area also forms the transition area between "Buntsandstein" (colored sandstone) and limestone. The municipality is named after the stream "Kämpfelbach". It rises in Ispringen and ends with a total length of twelve miles in the Pfinz at Remchingen. His catchment area is 88 km^{2}.

=== Neighboring communities ===
The Neighboring Communities of Kämpfelbach are Ispringen, Eisingen, Königsbach-Stein, Remchingen, Keltern and Pforzheim.

=== Administrative structures ===
The municipality of Kämpfelbach consists of the two villages Ersingen and Bilfingen.

== History ==
Grave mounds from the Hallstatt period can be found in the areas Rainwald, Ernstenfeld, Kühlloch and Bernel. These have been dated to 900-500 BC. Bilfingen was first mentioned in 1193, Ersingen in 1197. This was done in papal bulls whereby pope Celestine III. confirmed the possessions of the monastery of Frauenalb in Ersingen and Bilfingen. The names of the villages Ersingen and Bilfingen are of Alemannic origin. Around 260 AD, the Allamanni inhabited this area. They normally gave their settlements the name of their clan elders with the additional sylabble -ingen. Bilfingen is probably named after a Binolf and Ersingen after Ergeso.

=== Common history of the villages Ersingen and Bilfingen ===
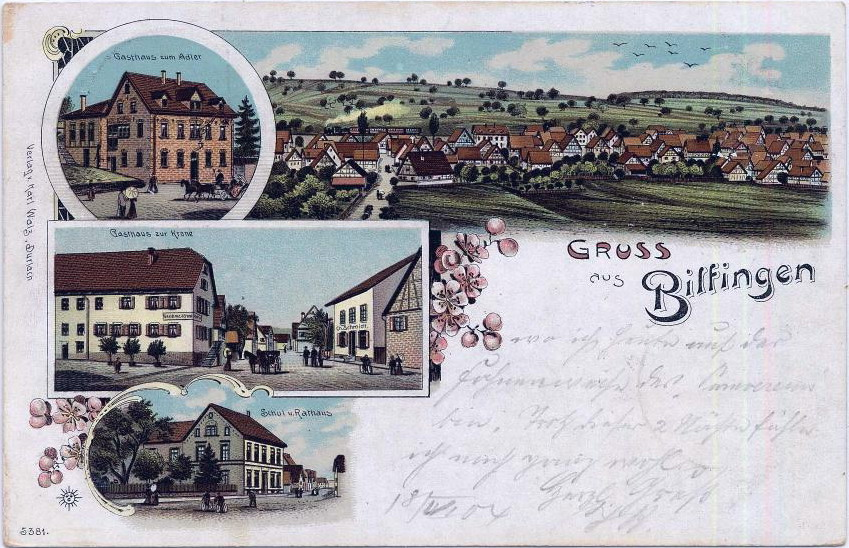
Bilfingen 1900

The two villages have more in common than one might suspect at first. The villages Ersingen and Bilfingen formed already in the Middle Ages a market cooperative and had a common administration. They differed from the surrounding villages not only in therms of Religion but had also different sovereigns.

=== Black death ===
In 1357 232 inhabitants of Ersingen and Bilfingen died from the black death. The survivors took a vow and celebrate the "Gelübdetag" (day of vow) on an annual basis on 7 September. In 2007 the parishes celebrated the 650th "Gelübdetag".

=== Religion ===
The history of the villages is closely connected with the monastery of Frauenalb. In 1248 the monastery of Frauenalb incorporates the church of Ersingen. Through further acquisitions starting from the year 1517, the monastery almost owned the whole district of Ersingen and Bilfingen. As the villages became the property of the monastery, the catholic faith was forced upon the communities. This changed in 1598 as the patronage of the monastery's possessions was passed on form the house of Baden-Baden to the house of Baden-Durlach. According to the principle cuius regio, eius religio the citizens had to convert to Calvinism. During this time, the monastery of Frauenalb was abolished. When the Margrave William of Baden-Baden in 1625 came into possession of the two villages, they became Catholic again. In 1631 the monastery of Frauenalb was rebuilt. From that year until secularisation in 1803, the two villages were again in possession of the monastery. The common history with the monastery of Frauenalb is the reason why the majority of the inhabitants of Kaempfelbach are catholic while all other surrounding villages are Protestant in majority.

=== Foundation of the municipality of Kämpfelbach ===
During the merger of municipalities in Baden-Württemberg in the 1970s the citizens remembered their common history. On 1 July 1974 the independent villages Ersingen and Bilfingen merged to the municipality of Kämpfelbach.

== Demographics ==
Population development:

Year	Inhabitants
1990	5,753
2001	6,164
2011	6,350
2021	6,356

== Politics ==
=== Municipal Council ===
The Municipal Council of Kämpfelbach consists of 18 councilors.

=== Mayor ===
Udo Kleiner was elected as the mayor of Kämpfelbach on 23 October 2006.

=== Coat of Arms ===
The Coat of Arms of the municipality of Kämpfelbach is in use since 1976. It shows an inclined bar in red color on a golden shield. Two lilies are shown on the red bar.

== Culture and places of interest ==
=== Theatre ===
The association "Mäddich-Bühne" is performing plays in the regional idiom. The plays are written by the amateur artists themselves.

=== Museum ===
The Association "Heimatpflege und Kultur Kämpfelbach" (preservation of tradition and culture in Kämpfelbach) renovated the attic of the old school building in Ersingen. The building has historical value since it was used as a storage for goods which had to be paid to the monastery of Frauenalb since 1500. Since October 2005 this place is used as a museum to show the history of the village and the region.

=== Places of interest ===
- The Mount of Olives sculptures in Ersingen represents the biblical passage in which Jesus prayed with his disciples on the eve of his crucifixion in the Garden of Gethsemane. The group picture was first mentioned in 1664. According to the style, this group of sculptures was created in the late Gothic period in 1500, the artist is unknown.
- "Johanneskirche" (St. John's Church) in Bilfingen
- Grave mounds from the Hallstatt period
- War Memorial Chapel at the end of Kirchgrundstr. in Bilfingen (built in 1936 by Roman August Burkhardt, a businessman from Durlach, "in memory and blessing of my hometown Bilfingen")
- Hiking trails in the municipality of Kämpfelbach, marked by the "Hügelland" hiking club.

=== Scheibenschlagen (Traditional Disk Hitting) ===
Scheibenschlagen is an ancient Celtic tradition which takes place on Carnival Sunday and Carnical Monday in Ersingen. Hereby wooden disks (10 x 10 cm) are placed on hazelnut sticks and lightened in the fire. The disks are shot down the valley with the assistance of a launch ramp. Ersingen is the most northern village which performs that Alemannic custom. The ritual of "Scheibenschlagen" was first documented in 1090 as part of the Lorsch monastery burned down by a fire caused by the custom. The area name "Scheibenplatz" (Disk place) testifies the long tradition of traditional disk hitting in Ersingen since it was first mentioned in 1532 as "schyblechten bletz". The custom is Celtic by origin and is an ancient celebration of the Solstice. The glowing disc symbolizes the sun which was worshipped in the Celtic culture. The Inhabitants worshipped the sun due to increasing temperature and daylight periods in spring.

Before the hitting of the disk, the disk hitter receites the following verses in regional dialect „Scheibehut, Scheibehut, üwer Ägger und Rain, wem soll die Scheibe sei? Gaiht se links, gaiht se rechts, gaiht se meim Vadder ewe recht."

Interpretation: The term "Scheibe" (Disk) stands for the sun and the term "hut" (hat) for protection, thereby protection by the sun. The disk shall be dedicated to an individual (in this case the father, but it can also be the mother or the girlfriend). The disk which is flying above the valley should protect the dedicated individual.

After World War II, the "Scheibenschlagen" was temporarily banned. The Nazi regime abused that ancient tradition to celebrate Germanic Culture. During this time, the Disk hitting was organized by their youth wing Hitlerjugend. The Ersinger Carneval association reintroduced the tradition in 1956.

== Economy and Infrastructure ==
=== Traffic ===
The Landesstraße 570 is built through Kämpfelbach. The Bundesstraße10 passes south of the municipality and connects to the Autobahn8. Kämpfelbach is connected to the railway line Karlsruhe - Stuttgart with stations in Ersingen and Bilfingen.

=== Public institutions ===
- "Kirchbergschule" in Ersingen (Primary and Secondary School)
- Catholic Kindergarten St. Michael in Ersingen
- Gymnastic and celebration hall in Ersingen
- Public indoor swimming pool in Ersingen
- Primary School in Bilfingen
- Catholic Kindergarten in Bilfingen
- Libraries in Ersingen and Bilfingen

== Personalities ==
- Balthasar Vielsack, also called „Schimmelisbalz" was a citizen of Ersingen. After the fire of Moscow (1812) during the disastrous withdrawal of the troops of Napoleon, he hide the flag of Baden underneath his cloth and saved its honour.

=== Honorary Citizens ===
- Johann Alexander Frey (23 November 1876 – 24 February 1960) was mayor of Ersingen from 1919 to 1937. His period of service was dominated by the difficult years after WW1. He was forced to retire by the Nazis in 1937.
- Gustav Adolf Reiling (2 February 1899 – 7 March 1973) was the author of the chronicle Geschichte der ehemals frauenalbschen Dörfer Ersingen und Bilfingen. He researched the History of the Surname Reiling back until the 16th century.
- H. H. Pfarrer Bernhard Geier (12 August 1911 – 18 December 1981) was a catholic priest in Ersingen from 1950 until his death in 1981.
- Ernst Korb (7 December 1941) was mayor of Bilfingen at first and then from 1974 to 1998 the mayor of Kämpfelbach.
- H.H. Pfarrer Alois Weber (30 June 1928 – 20 January 2009) was for more than 20 years the catholic priest of the parish Christ-König in Ersingen.

== Literature ==
- Rudolf Vögele: 1997 Ersingen, unsere Heimat – Ein Teil seiner Geschichte. Geiger-Verlag, Horb am Neckar, ISBN 3-89570-292-7
- Michael Mutschelknauß: Bilfingen – in Worten, Bildern und Zahlen. Geiger-Verlag, Horb am Neckar 1994, ISBN 3-89264-896-4
- Gustav Adolf Reiling: Geschichte der ehemals frauenalbischen Dörfer Ersingen und Bilfingen. 1937
