= Saint Joseph's Day =

Christian feast day for Jesus's legal father

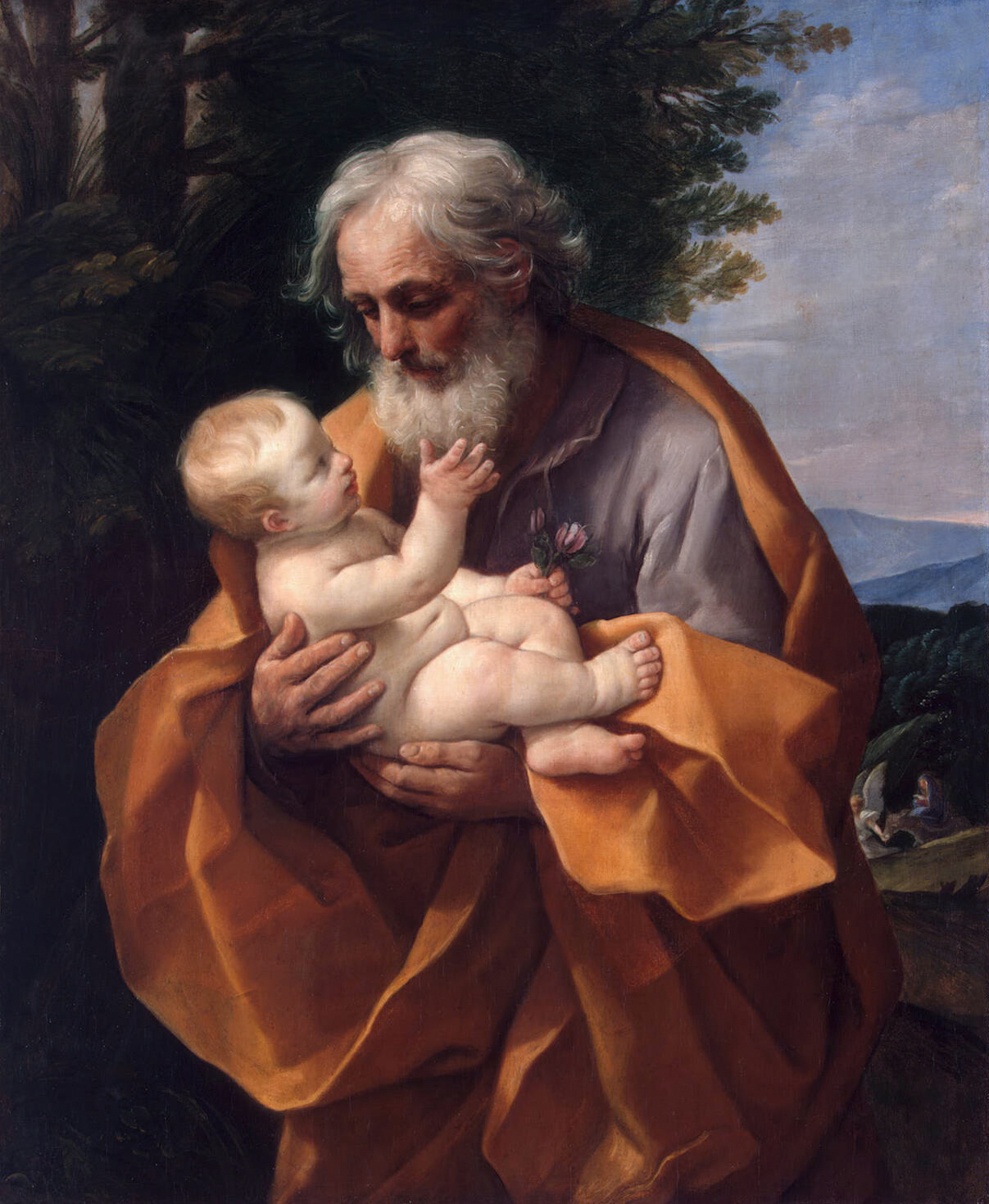
- Saint Joseph with the Infant Jesus by Guido Reni, c 1635
- Also called: Feast of Saint Joseph
- Observed by: Catholic Church; Lutheran Church; Anglican churches Public holiday in Vatican City
- Celebrations: Carrying blessed fava beans, wearing red-coloured clothing, assembling home altars dedicated to Saint Joseph, attending a Saint Joseph's Day parade
- Observances: Church attendance at Mass or Divine Service
- Date: 19 March
- Frequency: every year (annual)

Saint Joseph's Day, actually the Feast of Saint Joseph or the Solemnity of Saint Joseph, is in Western Christianity the principal feast day of Saint Joseph, husband of the Virgin Mary and legal father of Jesus Christ, celebrated on 19 March. It has the rank of a solemnity in the Catholic Church. It is a feast or commemoration in the provinces of the Anglican Communion, and a feast or festival in the Lutheran Church. Saint Joseph's Day is also Father's Day in some Catholic countries, mainly Spain, Portugal, Croatia, and Italy.

19 March was dedicated to Saint Joseph in several Western calendars by the 10th century, and this custom was established in Rome by 1479. Pope Pius V extended its use to the entire Roman Rite by his Apostolic Constitution Quo primum (14 July 1570). Originally a double of the second class and a feast of precept, it was re-raised to be of precept in 1917 after having this status intermittently lost, and consequently also raised to its current rank of double of the first class (now called a solemnity), having become in the meantime the rank common to all remaining general feasts of precept. Since 1969, Episcopal Conferences may, if they wish, transfer it to a date outside Lent. Even if it occurs inside Lent on the usual date of 19 March, it is still observed as a Solemnity of a Saint—this is one of the few times during Lent the Gloria may be said or sung, the vesture is changed from the purple or violet of Lent to white or gold (as it would be for such a solemnity normally), the Collect and the Eucharistic Prayer's Preface and other prayers are from the Solemnity and not Lent, the hymns are more joyful, and the Creed is said. However, the Alleluia is still not used, the Tract being used instead, per Lenten regulations.

Between 1870 and 1955, an additional feast was celebrated in honor of Saint Joseph as Spouse of the Blessed Virgin Mary and Patron of the Universal Church, the latter title having been given to him by Pope Pius IX. Originally celebrated on the third Sunday after Easter with an octave, after Divino Afflatu of Saint Pius X (see Reform of the Roman Breviary by Pope Pius X), it was moved to the preceding Wednesday (because Wednesday was the day of the week specifically dedicated to St. Joseph, St. John the Baptist and local patrons). The feast was also retitled The Solemnity of Saint Joseph. This celebration and its accompanying octave were abolished during the modernisation and simplification of rubrics under Pope Pius XII in 1955.

At the same time, Pope Pius XII established an additional Feast of Saint Joseph the Worker, to be celebrated on 1 May, in order to coincide with the celebration of International Workers' Day) in many countries. In the new calendar published in 1969, the Feast of Saint Joseph the Worker, which at one time occupied the highest possible rank in the Church calendar, was reduced to an optional Memorial, the lowest rank for a saint's day.

The Eastern Orthodox Church celebrates Saint Joseph on the Sunday after Christmas (with David and James the Just), 26 December (Synaxis of the Mother of God and flight of the Holy Family into Egypt) on the Sunday of the Holy Forefathers (two Sundays before the Nativity) and on the Sunday of the Holy Fathers (Sunday before the Nativity), when he is commemorated together with other ancestors of Jesus and on 19 March.

Popular customs among Christians of various traditions and customs observing Saint Joseph's Day are attending Mass or the Divine Service, wearing red-coloured clothing, carrying dried fava beans that have been blessed, and assembling home altars dedicated to Saint Joseph.

== Christian traditions ==
19 March always falls during Lent, a season traditionally marked by fast and abstinence. Saint Joseph's day, however, is a solemnity and per the 1983 Code of Canon Law overrides Friday obligations in the Catholic Church. Previously, per the 1917 Code of Canon Law, the obligation of fasting and abstinence was not dispensed on St. Joseph's Day even where it was kept as a Holy Day of Obligation.

If the feast day falls on a Sunday other than Palm Sunday, it is observed on the next available day, usually Monday, 20 March, unless another solemnity (e.g., a church's patron saint) falls on that day. Since 2008, if Saint Joseph's Day falls during Holy Week, it is moved to the closest possible day before 19 March, usually the Saturday before Holy Week. This change was announced by the Congregation for Divine Worship in Notitiae in order to avoid occurrences of the feasts of Saint Joseph and the Annunciation both being moved to just after the Easter octave. This decision does not apply to those using the 1962 Missal according to the provisions of Summorum Pontificum; when that missal is used, its particular rubrics, which require the feast to be transferred to the next available date after 19 March, must be observed. In practice, the 1962 rubrics lead to the observance of St. Joseph's Day on the Tuesday following the Second Sunday of Easter, as the Feast of the Annunciation (which must also be transferred in years when its assigned date, 25 March, falls during either Holy Week or the octave of Easter) is observed on the Monday after the Second Sunday of Easter.

=== Italy and San Marino ===
In Italy, Saint Joseph's Day is also celebrated as Father's Day. In the historical region of Romagna, including the independent Republic of San Marino, bonfires known as the fogheraccia are lit on the eve of Saint Joseph's Day; the bonfires are especially popular in Rimini, where they extend the length of the city's coastal conurbation from Cattolica to Cesenatico. Bonfires are traditionally lit for Saint Joseph's Day in several other places in Italy outside Romagna, such as in Bobbio, Emilia-Romagna, in Matera, Basilicata; in the Val Trebbia, and in Serracapriola, Apulia. Zeppole are traditionally fried on the bonfires in Itri, Lazio.

In Calabria, lagane e ceci, a pasta dish containing chickpeas, is shared among families and neighbours on Saint Joseph's Day. The custom, which is known as u cumbitu, may have emerged in the 20th century, or have origins in Calabria's medieval feudal society. Rich families invited poorer people from their neighbourhood for a feast at their house. Some of the guests would dress as the Holy Family, sometimes extended to include Joachim and Anne, Mary's parents. The hostess would kiss guests' hands in an act of reverence. Lagane e ceci was served as the first dish, followed by pan-fried cod and zeppole, the dessert typically associated with Saint Joseph in Calabria. After the meal, guests would be given leftovers to take home to their relatives. U cumbitu notably suspended class structures in Calabria, which was particularly afflicted by poverty and hunger, and was a symbol of social solidarity and fraternity.

==== Sicily ====
In Sicily and in many Italian-American communities, giving food to the needy is a Saint Joseph's Day custom. In some communities it is traditional to wear red clothing and eat zeppole. A traditional Sicilian dish especially associated with Saint Joseph's Day is Maccu di San Giuseppe, which consists of maccu and various ingredients.

One prominent custom is the Saint Joseph's Day altar, which are elaborately decorated with figurines, medals, and votive candles. The altar is divided into three tiers, representing the three persons of the Trinity, with a statue of Joseph at its head. The tables are dressed with food, which is donated to the poor on the solemnity. On the altar, people place flowers, limes, candles, wine, fava beans, specially prepared cakes, breads, and cookies (as well as other meatless dishes), and zeppole. Foods are traditionally served containing bread crumbs to represent sawdust since Joseph was a carpenter. Because the feast occurs during Lent, traditionally no meat was allowed on the celebration table.

According to legend, Saint Joseph interceded to relieve a famine in Sicily during the Middle Ages. There was a severe drought at the time, and the people prayed for their patron saint to bring them rain. They promised that if God answered their prayers through Joseph's intercession, they would prepare a large feast to honor him. The rain did come, and the people of Sicily prepared a large banquet for their patron saint. The fava bean was the crop which saved the population from starvation and is a traditional part of Saint Joseph's Day altars and traditions. On the Sicilian island of Lipari, a variant of the legend says that sailors returning from the mainland encountered a fierce storm that threatened to sink their boat. They prayed to Saint Joseph for deliverance, and when they were saved, they swore to honor the saint each year on his feast day.

In Bagheria, Saint Joseph is even celebrated twice a year, the second time being held especially for people from Bagheria who come back for summer vacation from other parts of Italy or abroad.

=== Vatican City ===
In Vatican City, Saint Joseph's Day is a public holiday.

=== Malta ===
In Malta, the set date for the celebration of Saint Joseph is 19 March, but can be moved if necessary to fit into the Lent and Easter season. This has been a day of remembrance in Malta since the 10th century A.D. Most businesses shut down for this day for all the celebrations that occur. The main celebrations are held in Mdina, which is the "old capital" of Malta in the suburbs of the city of Rabat. There are three main events that occur for this day. One of them being special masses in honor of Saint Joseph. Then it follows with colorful processions with music bands in the streets and fireworks at night. The main procession takes place in the evening with the statue of Saint Joseph being carried to the church of Saint Mary of Jesus. The statue represents a high level of workmanship for the figure Joseph had in Jesus' life. Also, this is one of the public holidays in Malta, known as Jum San Ġużepp. People celebrate mass in the morning, and in the afternoon go for a picnic. It is a liturgical feast that occurs on a Sunday in summer. However, the city of Rabat celebrates the traditional Maltese feast where in the evening a procession is also held with the statue of Saint Joseph. On this day also the city of Żejtun celebrates the day, known as Jum il-Kunsill (Zejtun Council's Day), till 2013 was known as Jum iż-Żejtun (Zejtun's Day). During this day a prominent person from Żejtun is given the Żejtun Honour (Ġieħ iż-Żejtun). In the past years the Żejtun Parish Church has celebrated these feast days with a procession with the statue of Saint Joseph.

=== Spain ===
In Spain, Saint Joseph's Day is their version of Father's Day, which is called El Dia del Padre. In some parts of Spain it is celebrated as Falles. They feel that Saint Joseph is a good example of what a father figure should be like, which is why they connect these two days. Since Spain does correlate this day with Father's Day, it is tradition for children to cook their fathers breakfast or even give small gifts. It is a "meatless affair", because it occurs during the Lenten season. Some symbols to represent this day include Jesus holding carpenter tools, baby Jesus, and a staff with lilies. A few things to do on this day to celebrate are attending a special church service, visiting different cathedrals, joining Valencia's Falla Festival, and exploring the city, museums and art galleries. The Falla Festival runs for 5 days and ends on 19 March in remembrance of Saint Joseph.

=== Poland ===
To represent and honor Saint Joseph, Poland has hymns they made. A few of the hymns are Duszo moja, O Jozefie Ukochany, and Szczesliwy, Kto Sobie Patrona. Attitudes differ on whether meat can be eaten during the day; in some quarters, meatless food is to be eaten because it is Lent season, while in others the ranking of the feast as a solemnity means that there is no need to abstain from meat even when the feast falls on a Friday.

=== Philippines ===
In the Philippines, especially in rice producing provinces like Iloilo, some families maintain the ritual of holding a banquet for the Holy Family. An old man, a young lady, and a small boy, often chosen from among the poor, are honoured as representations of Saint Joseph, the Blessed Virgin Mary, and the Child Jesus, respectively. The three, sometimes dressed like the santo (traditional saint image) they each represent, are seated around a table set with the family's best silverware and china, and served a variety of courses. Hymns are sung while they are literally spoonfed by senior members of the host family and important guests. The Novena to Saint Joseph is also recited at a nearby temporary altar. The hosts and other participants then seek blessings from the "Holy Family" by paying obeisance to the three individuals (or images of the holy personages they represent), either through kissing icons in the hands of the trio or performing mano, all while genuflecting before them. The now-fed "Holy Family" are lastly given donations (monetary or in kind), which they split amongst themselves, as a thank-you gift after the ceremony.

=== United States ===
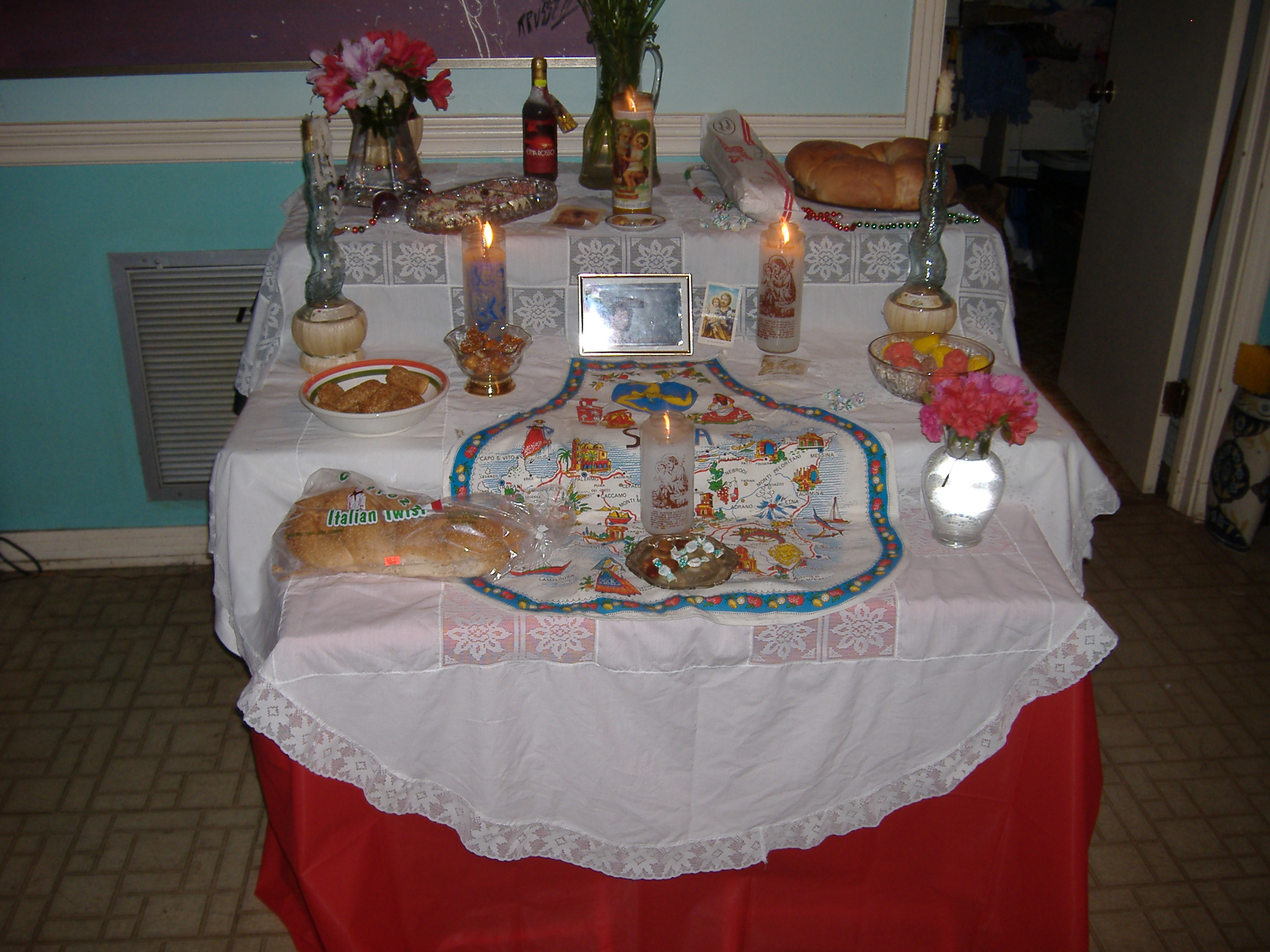
Traditional Saint Joseph's Altar in New Orleans

In New Orleans, Louisiana, which was a major port of entry for Sicilian immigrants during the late 19th century, the Feast of Saint Joseph is a citywide event. Both public and private Saint Joseph's altars are traditionally built, especially in and around the Lake Vista neighborhood. The altars are usually open to any visitor who wishes to pay homage. The food is generally distributed to charity after the altar is dismantled.

There are also parades in honor of Saint Joseph and the Italian population of New Orleans which are similar to the many marching clubs and truck parades of Mardi Gras and Saint Patrick's Day. Tradition in New Orleans also holds that by burying a small statue of Saint Joseph upside down in the front yard of a house, that house will sell more promptly. In addition to the above traditions, some groups of Mardi Gras Indians stage their last procession of the season on the Sunday nearest to Saint Joseph's Day otherwise known as "Super Sunday", after which their costumes are dismantled.

Saint Joseph's Day is also celebrated in other American communities with high proportions of Italians such as New York City; Utica, NY; Syracuse, NY; Niagara Falls, NY; Rochester, NY; Buffalo, NY; Hawthorne, NJ; Hoboken, NJ; Jersey City, NJ; Kansas City, MO; Chicago, IL; Gloucester, Mass.; Hartford, Connecticut; New Haven, Connecticut; and Providence, Rhode Island, where observance (which takes place just after Saint Patrick's Day) often is expressed through "the wearing of the red", i.e., wearing red clothing or accessories similar to the wearing of green on Saint Patrick's Day. Saint Joseph's Day tables may also be found in Rockford and Elmwood Park, Illinois.

Americans of Polish ancestry, especially those in the Midwest and New England, who have the name Joseph celebrate Saint Joseph's Day (Dzien Swietego Jozefa) as an imieniny. As a symbol of ethnic pride, and in solidarity with their Italian counterparts, Polish Catholic parishes often hold Saint Joseph's Day feasts known as Saint Joseph's Tables or Saint Joseph's altars, and display statues and holy cards of Saint Joseph.

Saint Joseph's Day is also the day when the swallows are traditionally believed to return to Mission San Juan Capistrano after having flown south for the winter.

=== Canada ===
Saint Joseph is the patron saint of Canada. Saint Joseph's Oratory in Montreal hosts a novena and special masses to celebrate the feast of Saint Joseph. These events draw thousands of pilgrims to the basilica.

=== England ===
Joseph of Nazareth is remembered in the Church of England with a Festival on 19 March.

== See also ==
- Calendar of saints
- Public holidays in Vatican City
