= Anniversary of the Election of the Holy Father =

Public holiday in Vatican City

Anniversary of the Election of Pope Leo XIV
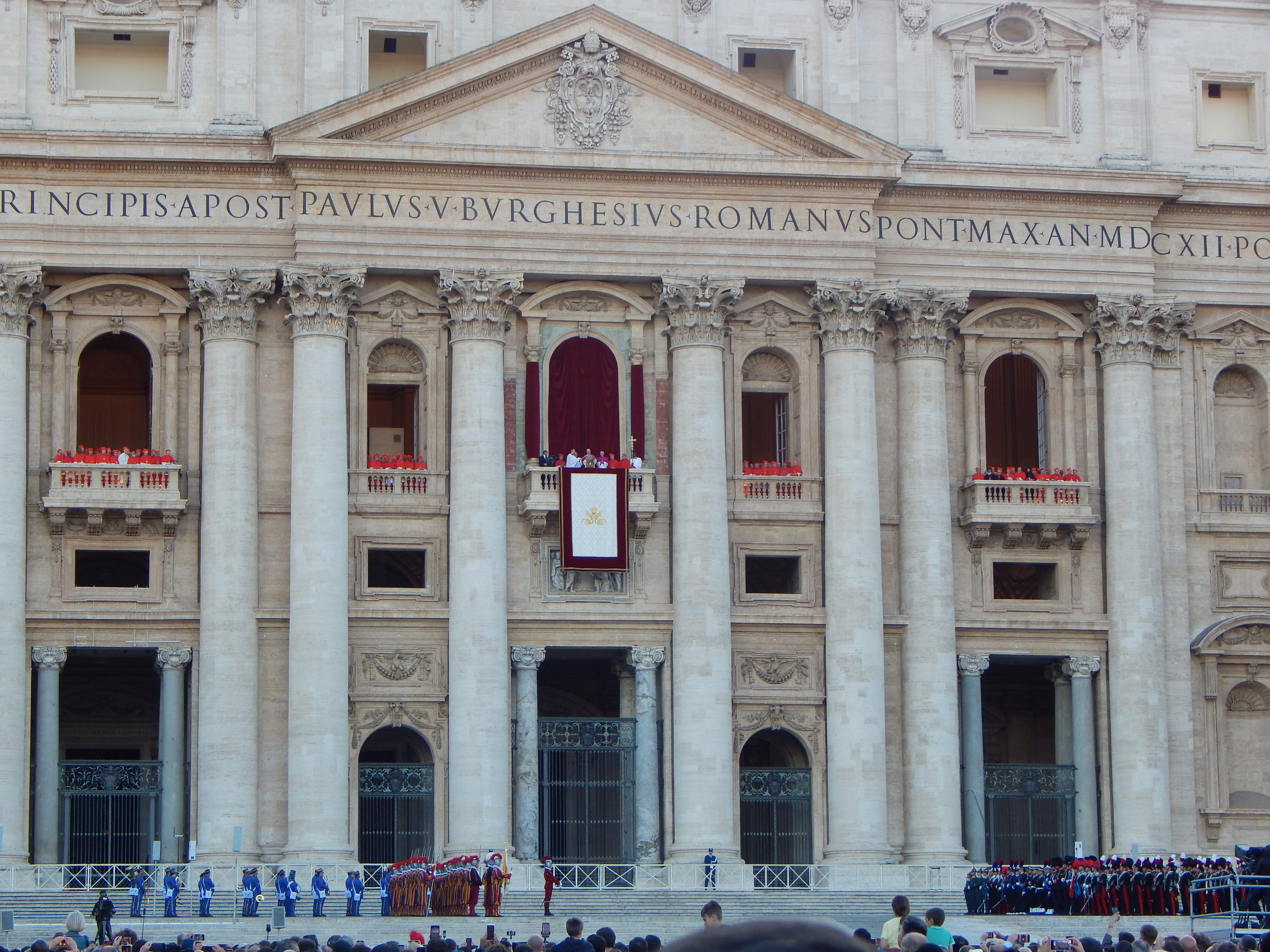
- The Facade of St. Peter's Basilica upon Pope Leo XIV's first appearance.
- Official name: Anniversary of the Election of the Holy Father
- Observed by: Vatican City (Public Holiday)
- Significance: Currently marks the Election of Pope Leo XIV on 8 May 2025.
- Date: 8 May
- Next time: 8 May 2027
- Frequency: Annual
- Started by: Vatican City State

The Anniversary of the Election of the Holy Father (Italian: Anniversario dell'Elezione del Santo Padre; Latin: Anniversarium Electionis Summi Pontificis) is a public holiday in Vatican City that celebrates the reigning Pope's Anniversary of Election. The date of this holiday varies with each reigning pope. This day has been a tradition and official holiday in Vatican City since the creation of the independent Vatican City State (97 years ago) under the Lateran Treaty in 1929. Currently known as the Anniversary of the Election of Pope Leo XIV, it marks the Election of Pope Leo XIV on May 8, 2025.

== Historical Dates ==
Date	Holiday Name	Election	Years Observed
May 8th	Anniversary of the Election of Pope Leo XIV	1 year ago	2026 - Current
March 13th	Anniversary of the Election of Pope Francis	13 years ago	2014 - 2025
April 19th	Anniversary of the Election of Pope Benedict XVI	21 years ago	2006 - 2012
October 16th	Anniversary of the Election of Pope John Paul II	48 years ago	1979 - 2004
August 26th	Anniversary of the Election of Pope John Paul I	48 years ago	N/A (33-day papacy)
June 21st	Anniversary of the Election of Pope Paul VI	63 years ago	1964 - 1978
October 28th	Anniversary of the Election of Pope John XXIII	68 years ago	1959 - 1962
March 2nd	Anniversary of the Election of Pope Pius XII	87 years ago	1940 - 1958
February 6th	Anniversary of the Election of Pope Pius XI	104 years ago	1930 - 1939

== See also ==
- Pope Leo XIV
- Public holidays in Vatican City
- Index of Vatican City-related articles
