= Lateran Treaty Day =

Lateran Treaty Day is a public holiday in Vatican City

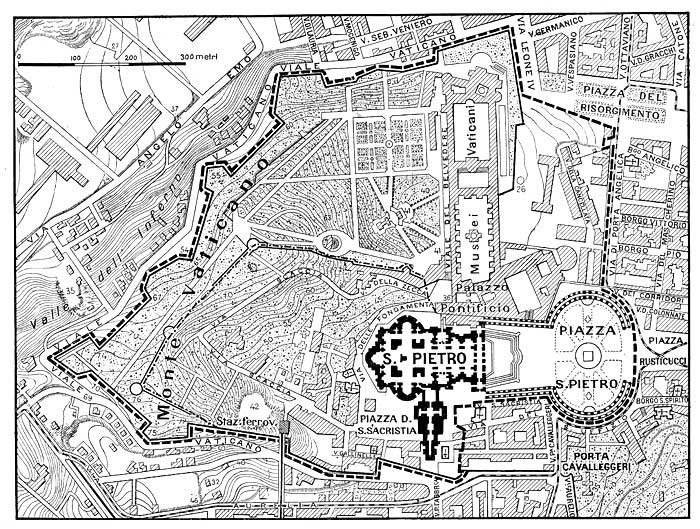
- 1929 Map of Vatican City State
- Official name: Anniversary of the Establishment of Vatican City State
- Observed by: Vatican City (Public Holiday)
- Significance: Commemorates the 1929 signing of the Lateran Treaty, which established Vatican City as a sovereign state.
- Date: 11 February
- Next time: 11 February 2027
- Frequency: Annual
- Started by: Vatican City State

Lateran Treaty Day also known as Anniversary of the Establishment of Vatican City State (Italian: Anniversario della istituzione dello Stato della Città del Vaticano; Latin: Anniversarium Institutionis Status Civitatis Vaticanae) is a public holiday observed in Vatican City annually on February 11th.

It is the national day of the Vatican City and marks the signing of the Lateran Treaty on 11 February 1929, which established Vatican City as a sovereign state 11 February 1929.

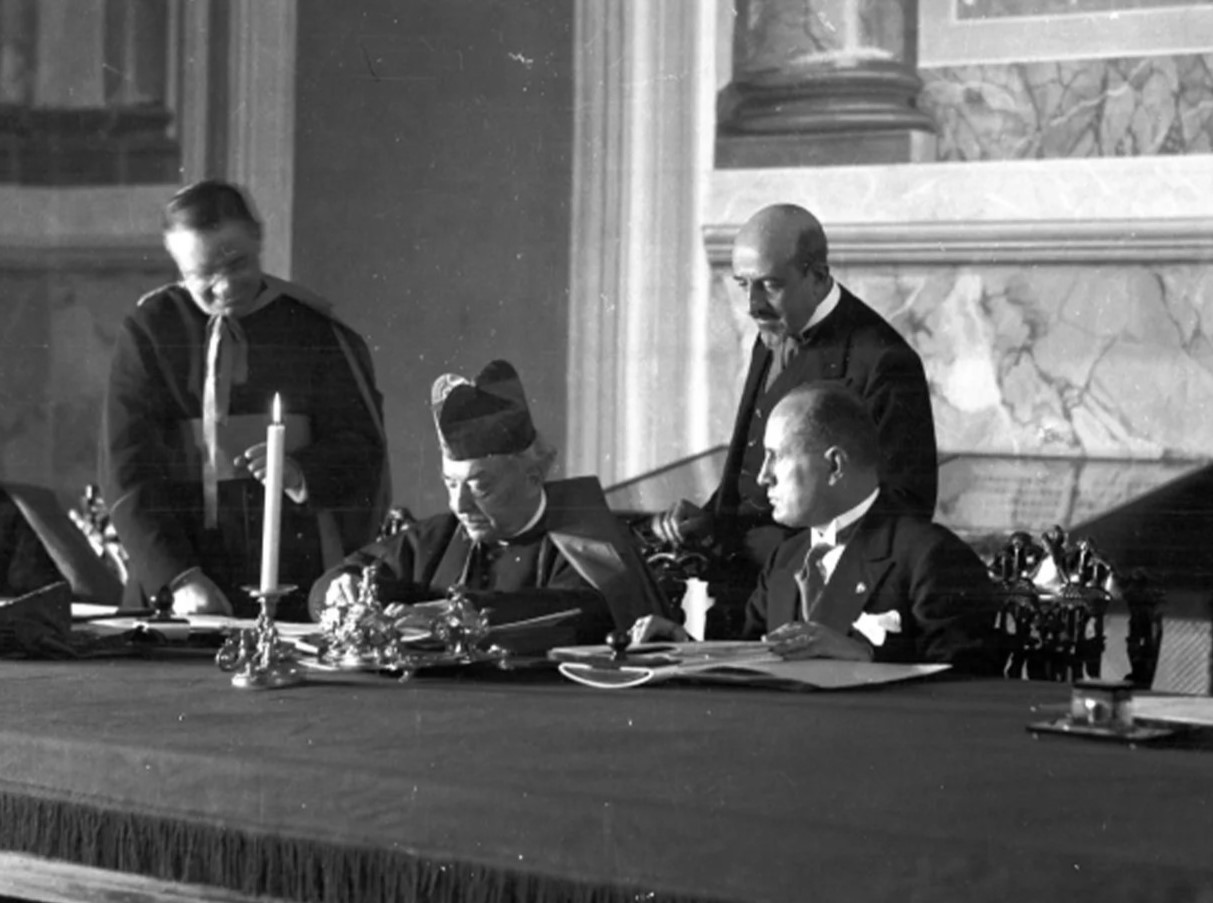
The moment of the signing of the Lateran Treaty. Cardinal Pietro Gasparri and Benito Mussolini are seated in the photo.

1929 Aerial view of Vatican City State featuring St. Peter's Basilica and St. Peter's Square.

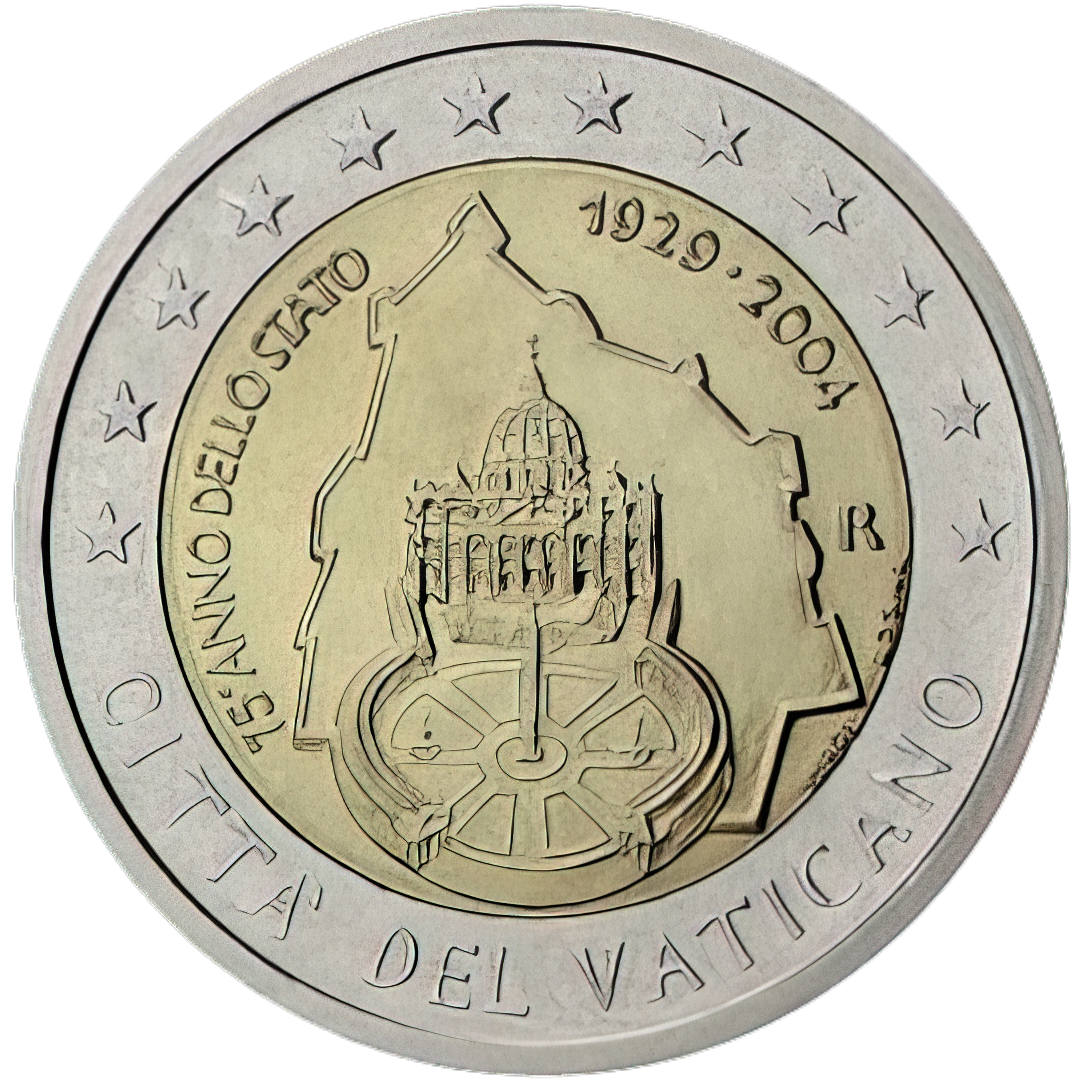
2004 Vatican 2-euro commemorative coin for the 75th. Anniversary of the Lateran Treaty.

== See also ==
- Lateran Treaty
- Public holidays in Vatican City
- Index of Vatican City-related articles
