= Scheibenschlagen =

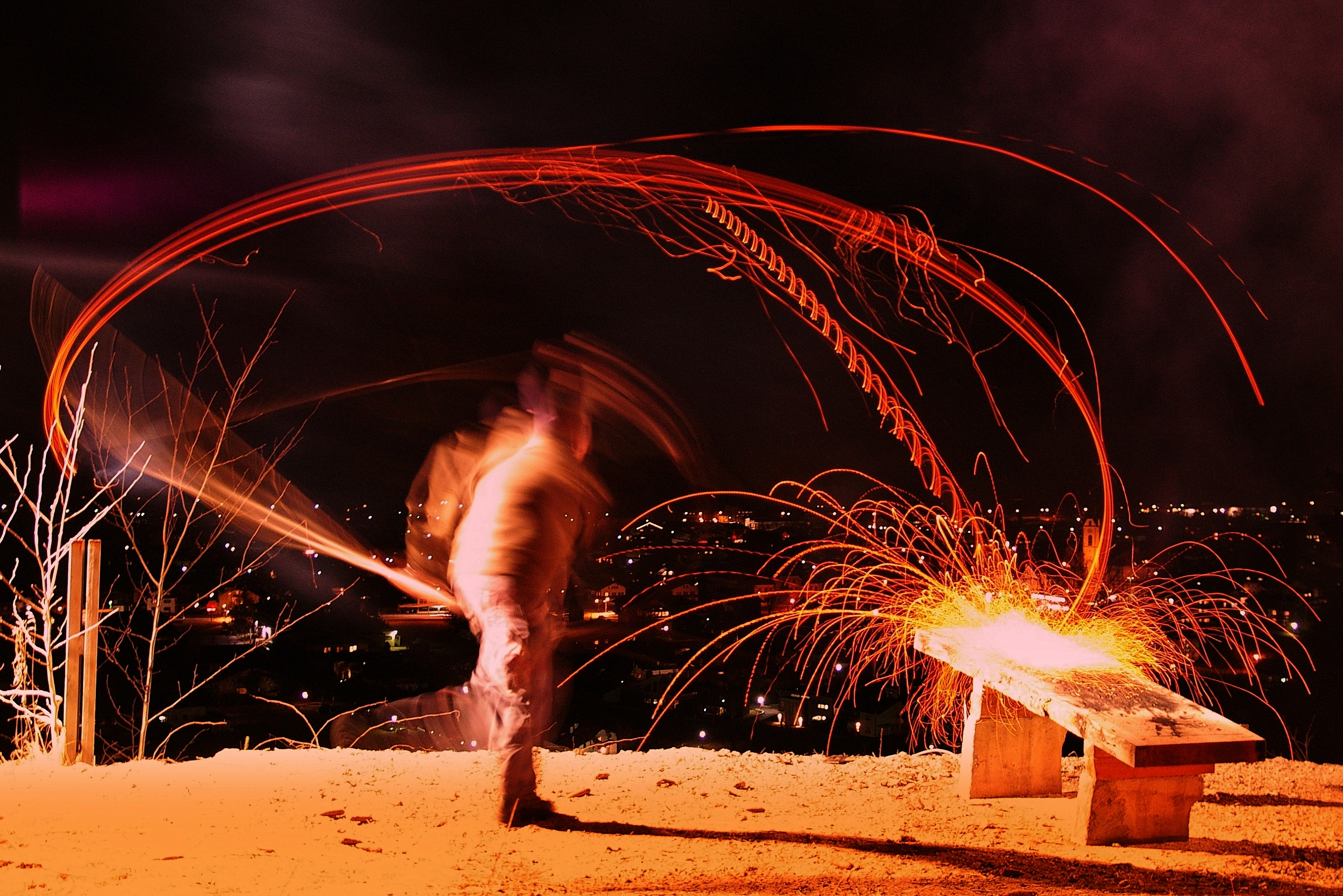
Scheibenschlagen in Zams

Scheibenschlagen (disk flinging) is a traditional event in Central Europe in which glowing wooden disks (10 x 10 cm / 4 x 4 inches) are flung from a long hazelnut stick off a mountain side into the valley below.

== History ==
Scheibenschlagen was first recorded as early as 1090 C.E. On March 21, 1090, a building neighboring the Lorsch Abbey was accidentally set on fire by a disk which had been flung during the event.

== Prevalence ==
Nowadays, Scheibenschlagen is most popular in the Swabian-Alemannic areas, South Tyrol and Vorarlberg. In the County of Tyrol, where the tradition was once widespread, it is now only actively carried out in the area of Landeck and in the lower Virgental valley. However, in many rural areas (such as "Scheibschlagalm" in Brixental, "Scheibenbichl" in Imst, etc.) the tradition is still preserved.

The tradition of Scheibenschlagen is particularly widespread in and around the area of the Upper Rhine Plain (in the Black Forest, Breisgau, Basel-Landschaft, Alsace,) as well as in Vorarlberg, parts of West- and South Tyrol, in Bündner Oberland Breil/Brigels and in Churer Rheintal Untervaz. The northernmost place where Scheibenschlagen still regularly occurs, is in the district of Ersingen in Kämpfelbach, Northern Baden. Other than that, Scheibenschlagen is also popular amongst the Satu Mare Swabians in Romania.

== Practice ==
This traditional event is held either on the weekend of Septuagesima or during Easter. Depending on the region, these days have different names: Funkensonntag, Holepfannsunntag, Kassunnti (Käsesonntag), Küachlisunntig, Küechlesonntag Alti Fasnet. An exception is Bernau im Schwarzwald, where there are up to eight bonfires in which the discs are lit throughout fasting week (except Ash Wednesday). In the Elztal valley and in adjacent valleys in the Black Forest the Scheibenschlagen traditionally takes place on Laetare Sunday.

Scheibenschlagen is usually organized by various local clubs, scouts, Funkenzünften (for example traditional Alemannic carnival groups) or the volunteer fire department. Locally, in the Alemannic language area it is organized by current confirmands.

In Danis (Swiss canton Graubünden) the custom is called trer schibettas (Rhaeto-Romanic for Scheibenschlagen). Here the Scheibenschlagen is usually organized by a so-called Jungmannschaft (a group of young people, similar to scouts). Boys in the 3rd grade and older and all bachelors in the town may participate in the trer schibettas. Whilst hitting the disk, the words "Oh tgei biala schibetta per la ... (name of a girl)" are said. Translated it means: Oh what a beautiful disk for ... (name of a girl). If a hit turns out badly the words "Oh tgei tgagiarar per il scolast" are said. In Untervaz (Swiss canton Graubünden) the event is only meant for bachelors, young boys and the fathers of young boys; there the word Schybaschlaha is used, which is the common dialect word for Scheibenschlagen.

In Alsace the custom is called Schieweschlawe; in some small towns of the Alsatian-Swiss Leymental valley it is also called Reedlischwinge (swinging wheels).

The place where the bonfire is lit and the disks are hit is called Scheibenbühel (disk hill) or Scheibenfelsen (disk rock) in many towns.

=== Preparation ===
Not only the Scheibenschlagen itself but also the collecting of wood for the bonfire, usually also done by the army recruits or the confirmands of the town, is accompanied by rituals in certain regions: In the county of Ortenau, for example in Rammersweier, participants walk through the town with a cart singing this song, asking for wood and wishing people luck:

Wohl, Wohl Waihe,

Soll, soll saihe!

Gän mer au e Stierli

Zu unserm schöne Fierli!

Glück ins Hüs,

Serme rüs!

Alles guet, was 'r gän:

E Serme od´r e´ Well

The event begins in the late afternoon, with the villagers meeting and having hot beverages and pastries from their region. In the Alemannic area, the event sometimes also begins with a traditional torchlight procession.

=== Scheibenschlagen ===
Scheibenschlagen begins at dusk. After saying a few words, either as a greeting to the next participant or by reciting a short verse, each participant flings the disk into the darkness. In some regions the event is over when all households have thrown their discs and there are no more left. In Mals, Upper Vinschgau, on the same day a 12m long tree trunk called Hex is put up with a cross-piece wrapped in straw. This cross is set up on a little hill outside the village and gets burned after sunset. After all discs are used up a torchlight procession to the village begins. Afterwards the boys go home to the girls and are served food and drinks until the early morning hours. In Danis, Tavanasa, the youths come back to the village and do the same thing in small groups.

=== Verses for Scheibenschlagen ===
Alemannic region: Schiebi, schiebo, die Schieebe soll go, die Schiebe soll suure, em (Name des Opfers) an d' Schnuure. Oder: Schiebi, schiebo, wem soll die Schiebe go? Die Schiebe soll em ... go. Goht sie it, so gilt sie it.
Translated: Disc, disc, the disc should fly, the disc should hit (name of the victim) in the face. Or: Disc, disc, for whom should that disc fly? The disc should fly for (name). If it does not it does not count.

County of Tyrol: Dia Scheiba, dia Scheiba, dia will i iatz treiba, Schmolz in dr Pfonna, Kiachli in dr Wonna, Pfluag in dr Eard, dass dia Scheiba weit außi geat!
Translated: Disc, disc, it is you I want to propel, lard in the pan, cake in the tub, plow in the mud, that the disc may fly far.

Mals, Upper Vinschgau: Oh reim reim, wem weard eppar dia Scheib sein, dia Scheib und mei Kniascheib kearn dem Hanssmerl und der Seffa zur a guate Nocht, daß die Bettstatt krocht. Geaht sie guat, hobn si's guat, schaug, wia mei Scheibele ausigeat.

Schluderns, Upper Vinschgau: Oh reim reim reim fa weim weart dia Scheib sein, dia Scheib mei Kniascheib dia soll ... zu sein hotsas it guat tuatsas it guat sols miar und mein Scheibale nit fa ibel hobm, Schmolz in dr Pfonn, Korn in dr Wonn, Pflug untert Erd, schaug wia mein Scheibale ausigeat.

Breil/Brigels (Graubünden): Oh tgei biala schibetta per la (Mädchenname)!
Translated: Oh what wonderful disc for (maiden name)!
If the disc fails: Oh tgei tgagiarar per il scolast!

== Equipment ==
In the Alemannic region one traditionally uses a wooden stick and a wooden launch ramp called Scheibenbock to fling the disk. A wooden square with an edge length of about 10 cm and a thickness of 2 cm is used as the disk. Usually the disk is made out of Hardwood (Fagus sylvatica). In the middle there is a drill hole which has two purposes. One reason for the drill hole is to be able to carry many disks on a cord or wire and above all to put them on the stick. With the stick the disks are held in the fire or embers until they are also glowing. This glow is intensified by swinging the stick before hitting the disk. Production and naming of the disks can vary from region to region. In Leimental some disks are carved with a Billhook, others are shaped with a Drawknife depending on the village and it can vary from town to town. Besides the name Schiibli ("little disks") the wooden disks are also called Reedli ("little wheels") – the tradition is then called Reedlischwinge.

== Links ==
- Scheibenschlagen bei Lebendige Traditionen (Graubünden)
- Scheibenschlagen in Zell-Weierbach
- Scheibenfeuer Maulburg
- "Schiebeschlage" in Siensbach
