= Zeppole =

Italian doughnut

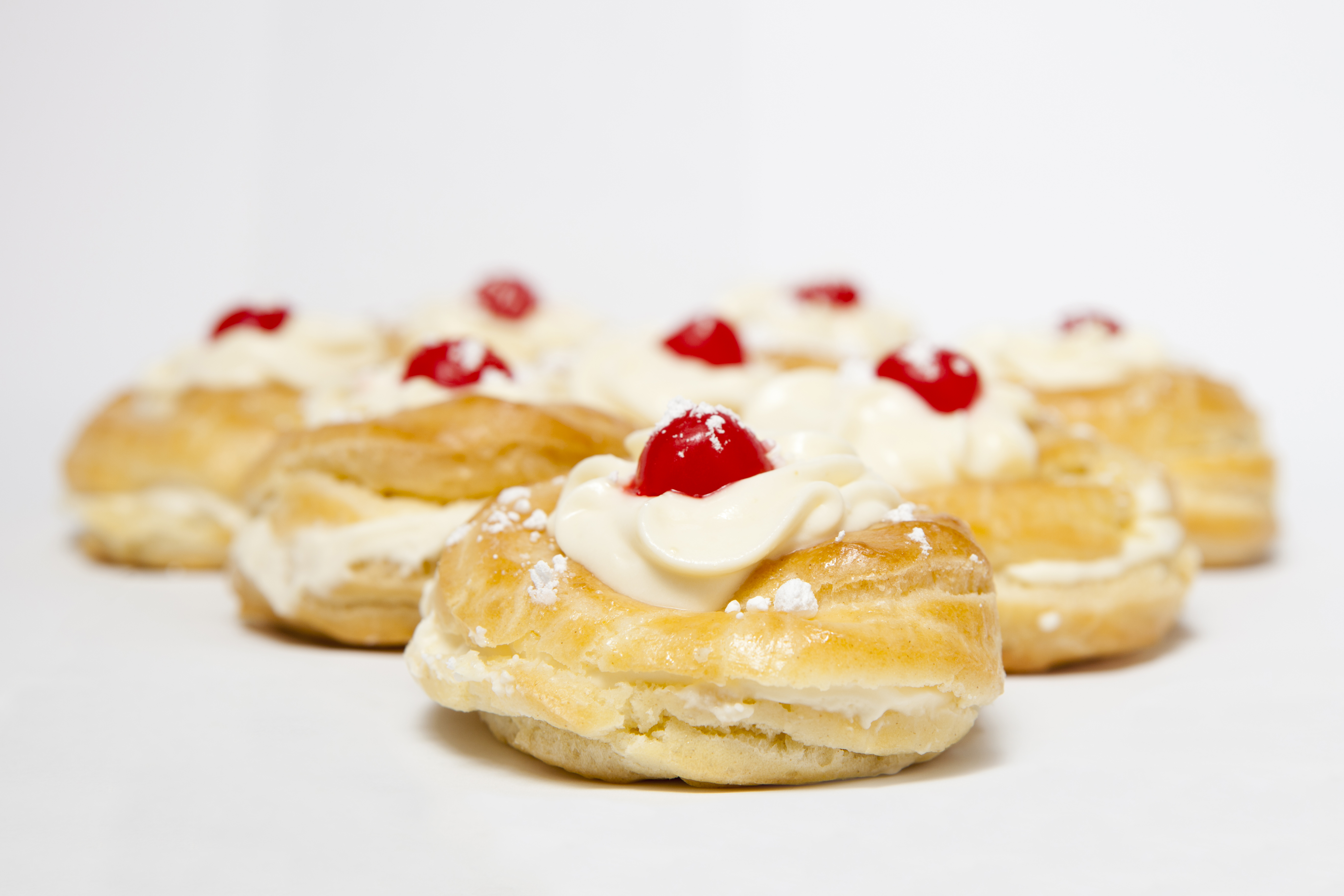
- Alternative names: Zeppola (Italian singular form), zeppole di San Giuseppe, bignè di San Giuseppe, Saint Joseph's Day cake, sfinge
- Type: Doughnut
- Place of origin: Italy
- Main ingredients: Dough, powdered sugar, fried dough

Zeppole (Italian: [ˈdzeppole]; sing.: zeppola) are Italian doughnut consisting of a deep-fried dough ball of varying sizes, but typically about 4 inches (10 cm) in diameter. These fritters are usually topped with powdered sugar, and may be filled with custard, jelly, cannoli-style pastry cream or a butter-and-honey mixture. The consistency ranges from light and puffy, to bread- or pasta-like. They are traditionally eaten to celebrate Saint Joseph's Day, which is a Catholic feast day.

== History ==
Zeppole are typical of Italian cuisine, especially that of Rome, Naples, and Lecce. They originated in ancient Rome, when people started frying dough and putting sugar or cinnamon on it. However, the zeppole that is around today was created in the 18th century. These zeppole either have sugar, cinnamon or chocolate with them. They are also served in Sicily, on the island of Malta, and in Italian communities in Canada and the United States. The Sardinian tzipulas, although they are often italianized to zeppole, are somewhat different. Zippole are eaten in Sardinia to celebrate Carnival. They can be seen with different ingredients and different shapes. Zippole differ from zeppole since you use a funnel to put the dough into the oil. Zippole then come out as different shapes due to the spiral motion used with the funnel. Zeppole are known by other names, including bignè di San Giuseppe (in Rome) and sfinge. They are traditionally consumed during the Festa di San Giuseppe ('Saint Joseph's Day'), celebrated every March 19, when they are sold on many streets and sometimes presented as gifts.

The custom was popularized in the early 19th century by Neapolitan baker Pasquale Pintauro.

== Variations ==
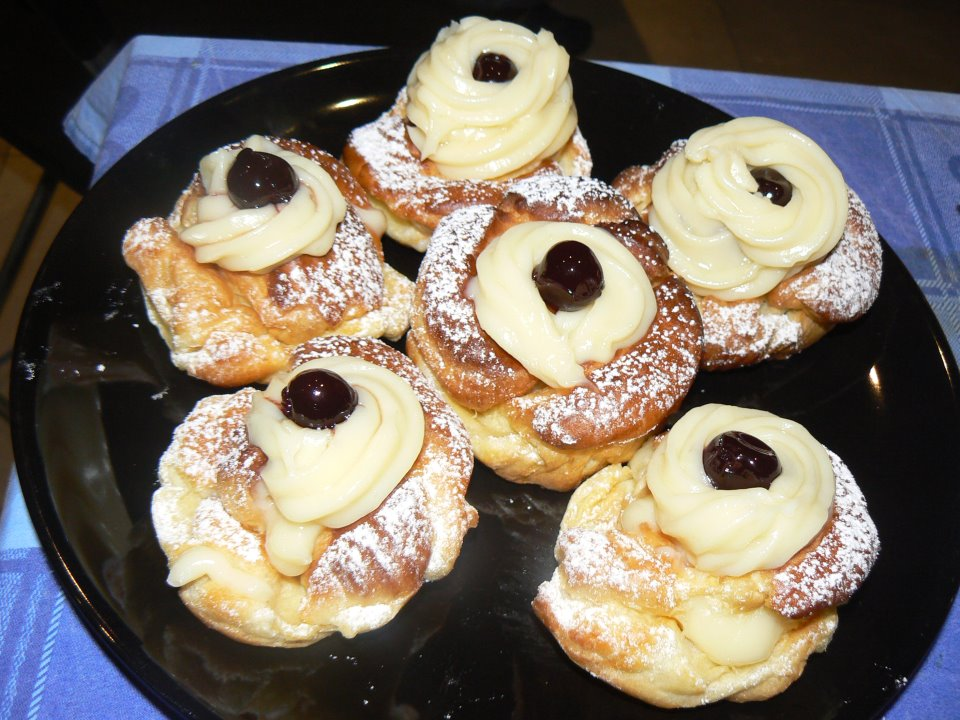
Zeppole di San Giuseppe

The terms zeppola and sfinge are also used to refer to baked cream puffs made from choux pastry.

Zeppole can also be savory, and consist of fried bread dough often filled with anchovy. In parts of Calabria, the anchovy or a sultana variation is consumed on New Year's Eve and New Year's Day. In Malta, anchovy zeppoli are traditionally consumed during the Lent fasting period. This version of savory zeppole is known locally as sfinge.

A variation in Sardinia is known as tzípulas.

== See also ==
Media related to Zeppole at Wikimedia Commons

- List of Italian desserts and pastries
- List of custard desserts
- List of doughnut varieties
- Pettole
- Zippula
