= Pan-Christianity =

Medieval Christian nationalist movement

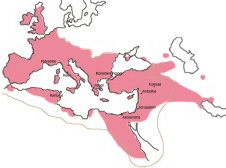
Christendom by A.D. 600 after its spread to Africa and Europe from the Middle East. Ethiopia and the Indian Malabar Coast not pictured.

The Church of the East at its largest extent during the Middle Ages.

In the Middle Ages, efforts were made in order to establish a single Christian state of Pan-Christianity by uniting the countries within Christendom. Christian nationalism may have played a role in this era in which Christians felt the impulse to recover lands in which Christianity flourished. Muslims militarily invaded parts of North Africa, East Asia, Southern Europe, Central Asia, and the Middle East, as well as parts of Europe. In response, Christians across national borders mobilized militarily and a "wave of Christian reconquest achieved the recovery of Spain, Portugal, and southern Italy, but was unable to recover North Africa nor—from a Christian point of view, most painful of all—the Holy Land of Christendom."

== See also ==
- Antidisestablishmentarianism
- Christian nationalism
- Christian state
- Christian Reconstructionism
- History of Christian flags
- Integralism
- Theonomy
