= Hayesville, Ohio =

- Village
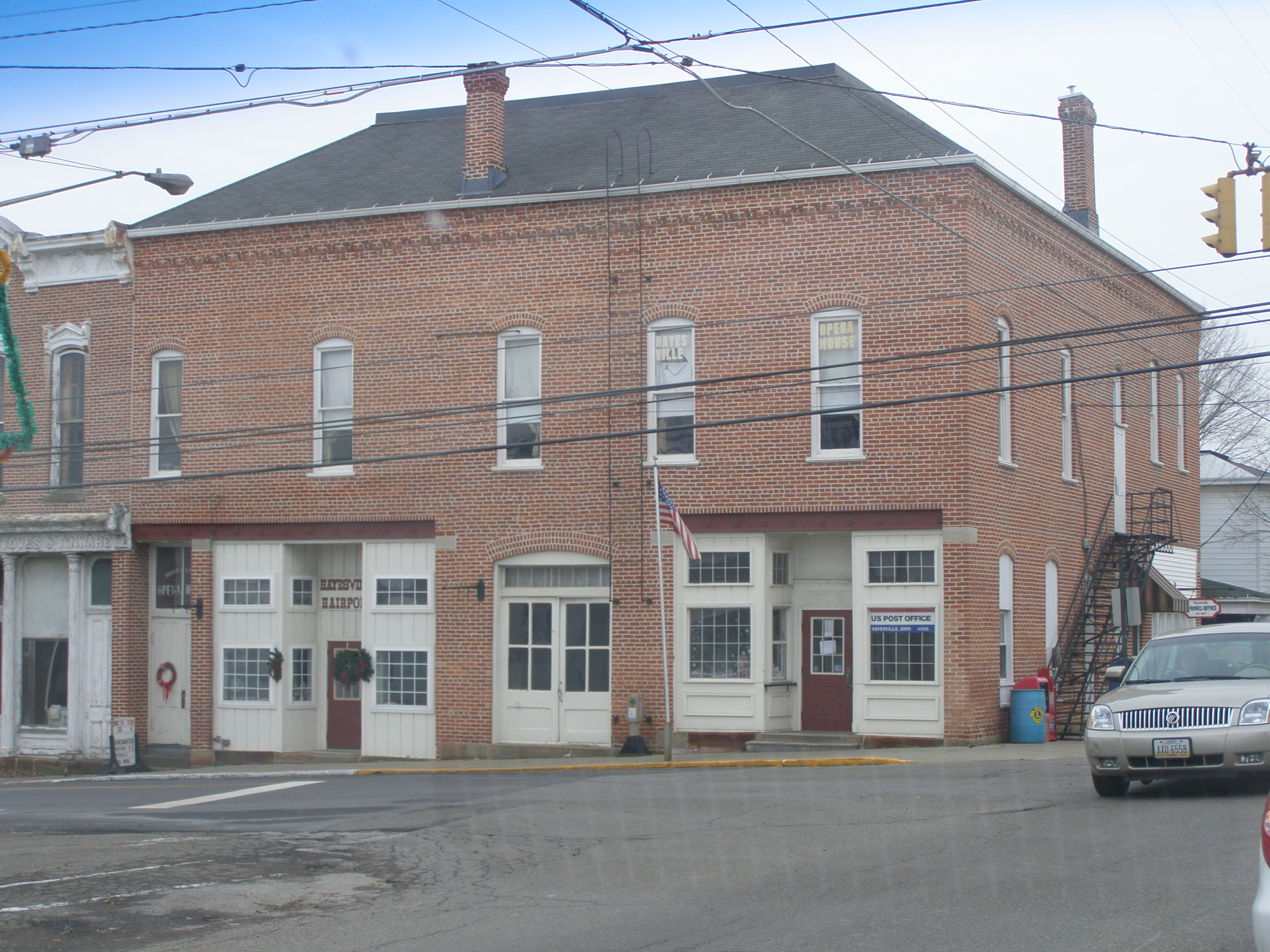
- Village Hall

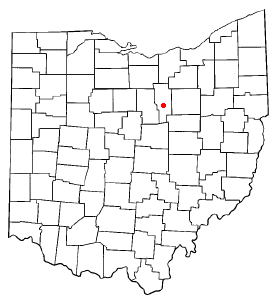
- Location of Hayesville, Ohio

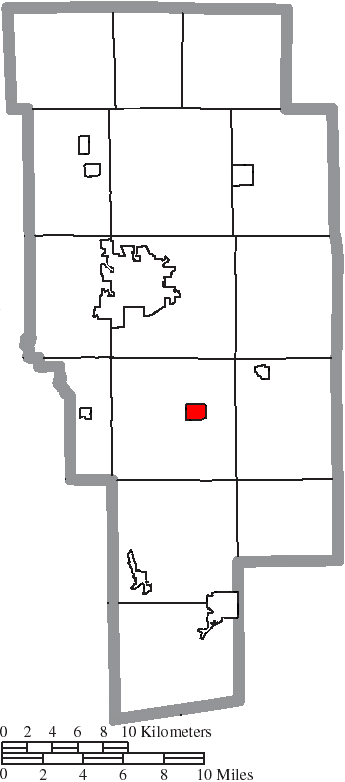
- Location of Hayesville in Ashland County
- Coordinates: 40°46′31″N 82°15′35″W
- Country: United States
- State: Ohio
- County: Ashland
- Township: Vermillion

Area
  - Total: 0.74 sq mi (1.92 km^{2})
  - Land: 0.74 sq mi (1.91 km^{2})
  - Water: 0.0039 sq mi (0.01 km^{2})
- Elevation: 1,217 ft (371 m)

Population (2020)
  - Total: 447
  - Estimate (2023): 443
  - Density: 605.7/sq mi (233.88/km^{2})
- Time zone: UTC-5 (Eastern (EST))
  - Summer (DST): UTC-4 (EDT)
- ZIP code: 44838
- Area code: 419
- FIPS code: 39-34636
- GNIS feature ID: 2398270

Hayesville is a village in Vermillion Township, Ashland County, Ohio, United States. The population was 447 at the 2020 census.

== History ==
Lemuel Boulter was the original owner of the land that the village of Hayesville was formed. Boulter sold his interest in the land to Linus Hayes. The first settlers came to the Hayesville area in 1817. A post office for the settlers was established in 1827 at Hayes Cross Roads. Hayesville was laid out in Vermillion Township and plots were recorded in Mansfield, Ohio on October 26, 1830. The village was named after Linus Hayes, proprietor. Hayes Cross Roads was later renamed Hayesville. The village of Hayesville was incorporated in 1849.

== Geography ==
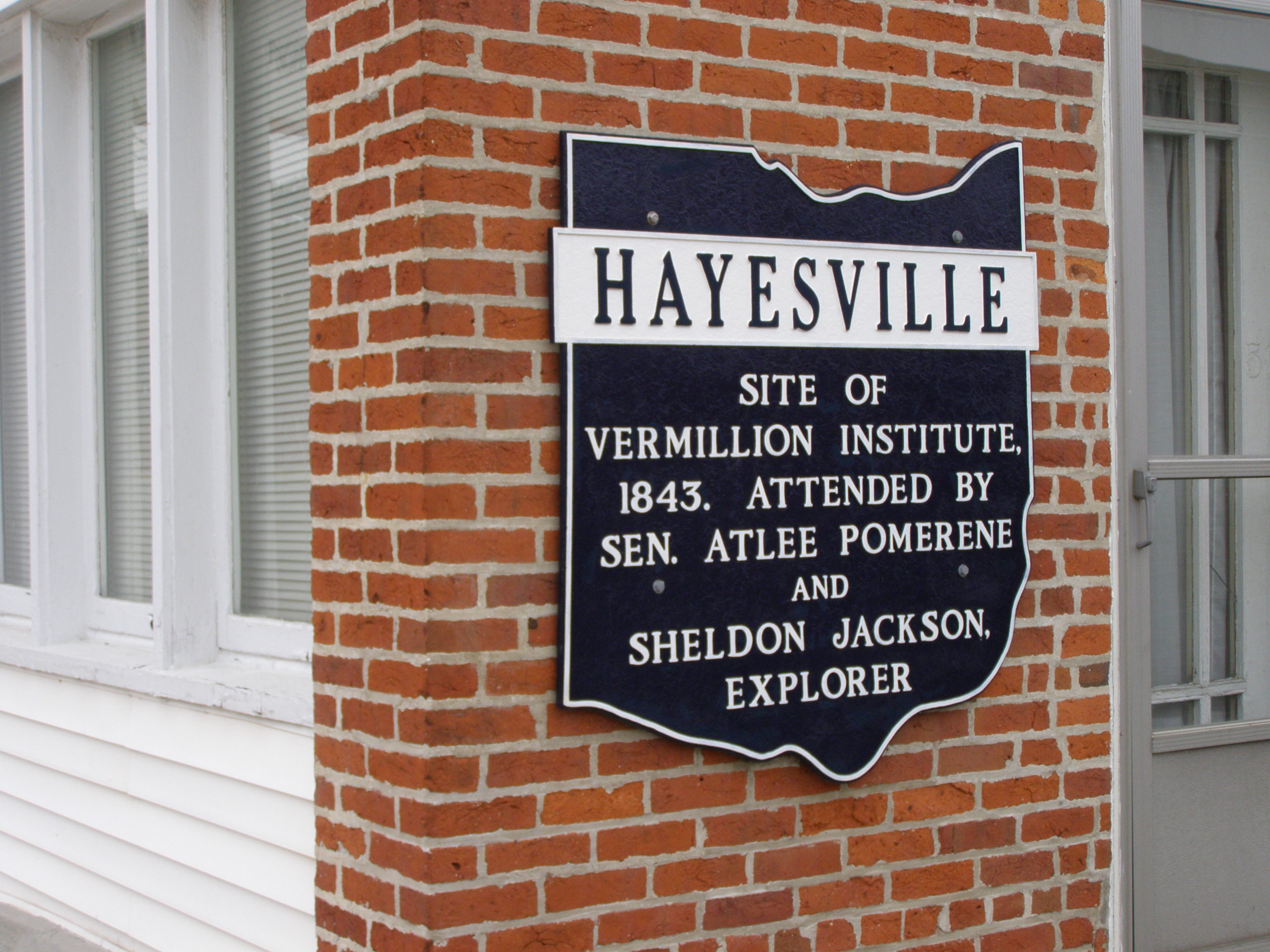
Hayesville Ohio Townhall-Old Opera House

According to the United States Census Bureau, the village has a total area of 0.74 square miles (1.92 km^{2}), all land.

== Demographics ==
Historical population
Census	Pop.	Note	%±
1850	441		—
1860	336		−23.8%
1870	576		71.4%
1880	563		−2.3%
1890	430		−23.6%
1900	332		−22.8%
1910	338		1.8%
1920	247		−26.9%
1930	382		54.7%
1940	363		−5.0%
1950	381		5.0%
1960	435		14.2%
1970	506		16.3%
1980	518		2.4%
1990	457		−11.8%
2000	348		−23.9%
2010	448		28.7%
2020	447		−0.2%
2023 (est.)	443	▼	−0.9%
U.S. Decennial Census

=== 2010 census ===
As of the census of 2010, there were 448 people, 184 households, and 135 families living in the village. The population density was 605.4 inhabitants per square mile (233.7/km^{2}). There were 192 housing units at an average density of 259.5 per square mile (100.2/km^{2}). The racial makeup of the village was 98.4% White, 0.2% Asian, and 1.3% from two or more races. Hispanic or Latino of any race were 0.4% of the population.

There were 184 households, of which 31.0% had children under the age of 18 living with them, 61.4% were married couples living together, 8.2% had a female householder with no husband present, 3.8% had a male householder with no wife present, and 26.6% were non-families. 22.8% of all households were made up of individuals, and 6.6% had someone living alone who was 65 years of age or older. The average household size was 2.43 and the average family size was 2.84.

The median age in the village was 42.8 years. 23.7% of residents were under the age of 18; 5.4% were between the ages of 18 and 24; 25.2% were from 25 to 44; 27.9% were from 45 to 64; and 17.9% were 65 years of age or older. The gender makeup of the village was 52.2% male and 47.8% female.

=== 2000 census ===
As of the census of 2000, there were 348 people, 136 households, and 95 families living in the village. The population density was 468.9 inhabitants per square mile (181.0/km^{2}). There were 141 housing units at an average density of 190.0 per square mile (73.4/km^{2}). The racial makeup of the village was 98.28% White, 1.15% African American and 0.57% Native American.

There were 136 households, out of which 27.9% had children under the age of 18 living with them, 63.2% were married couples living together, 4.4% had a female householder with no husband present, and 30.1% were non-families. 27.2% of all households were made up of individuals, and 7.4% had someone living alone who was 65 years of age or older. The average household size was 2.40 and the average family size was 2.91.

In the village, the population was spread out, with 20.1% under the age of 18, 7.2% from 18 to 24, 25.3% from 25 to 44, 29.6% from 45 to 64, and 17.8% who were 65 years of age or older. The median age was 44 years. For every 100 females there were 95.5 males. For every 100 females age 18 and over, there were 91.7 males.

The median income for a household in the village was $41,429, and the median income for a family was $52,500. Males had a median income of $34,375 versus $26,042 for females. The per capita income for the village was $18,509. About 7.1% of families and 8.0% of the population were below the poverty line, including 3.7% of those under age 18 and none of those age 65 or over.

== Notable person ==
- Ralph Eugene Diffendorfer, Methodist clergyman and one of the designers of the Christian flag
