= Flag of Vatican City =

Vatican City State
- 2023 version of the flag
- Use: National flag
- Proportion: 1:1
- Adopted: 7 June 1929; 97 years ago (original adoption); 7 June 2023; 3 years ago (most recent modification)
- Design: A vertical bicolour of yellow and white, charged with the emblem of the Holy See centred on the white portion

The flag of Vatican City, also referred to as the flag of the Holy See, consists of vertical bicolour of yellow and white, with the white half charged with the emblem of the Holy See (a papal tiara and the crossed keys of Saint Peter). It was adopted in 1929, the year Pope Pius XI signed the Lateran Treaty with Italy, creating the new independent state of Vatican City.

It was modeled after the 1808 flag of the Papal States, a yellow-and-white bicolour defaced with the tiara and keys in the centre. It is one of only two national flags that use a 1:1 aspect ratio, along with the flag of Switzerland.

The Holy See, which governs Vatican City, has ecclesiastical jurisdiction over the worldwide Catholic Church. As a result, the flag is also a symbol of Catholic faith or identity, and it is often displayed at Catholic churches.

== Description ==
The 2023 Fundamental Law of Vatican City State states: "The flag of the Vatican City State is made up of two vertically divided sides, one yellow adhering to the hoist and the other white, and in the latter carries the tiara with the keys, all according to the model on Annex A of this Law".

== Regulations ==
=== Current regulations ===
The flag is described in Article 23 of the 2023 Fundamental Law of Vatican City State, with a visual model appended as Attachment A.

=== Previous regulations ===
The flag is described in Article 19 of the 1929 Fundamental Law of Vatican City State, with a visual model appended as Attachment A.

The flag is also described in Article 20 of the 2000 Fundamental Law of Vatican City State, with a visual model appended as Attachment A. The 2000 Fundamental Law of Vatican City State's Attachment A, shows a square flag.

In 2010, the Apostolic Nunciature to Germany stated that the flag does not have to be square.

== History ==
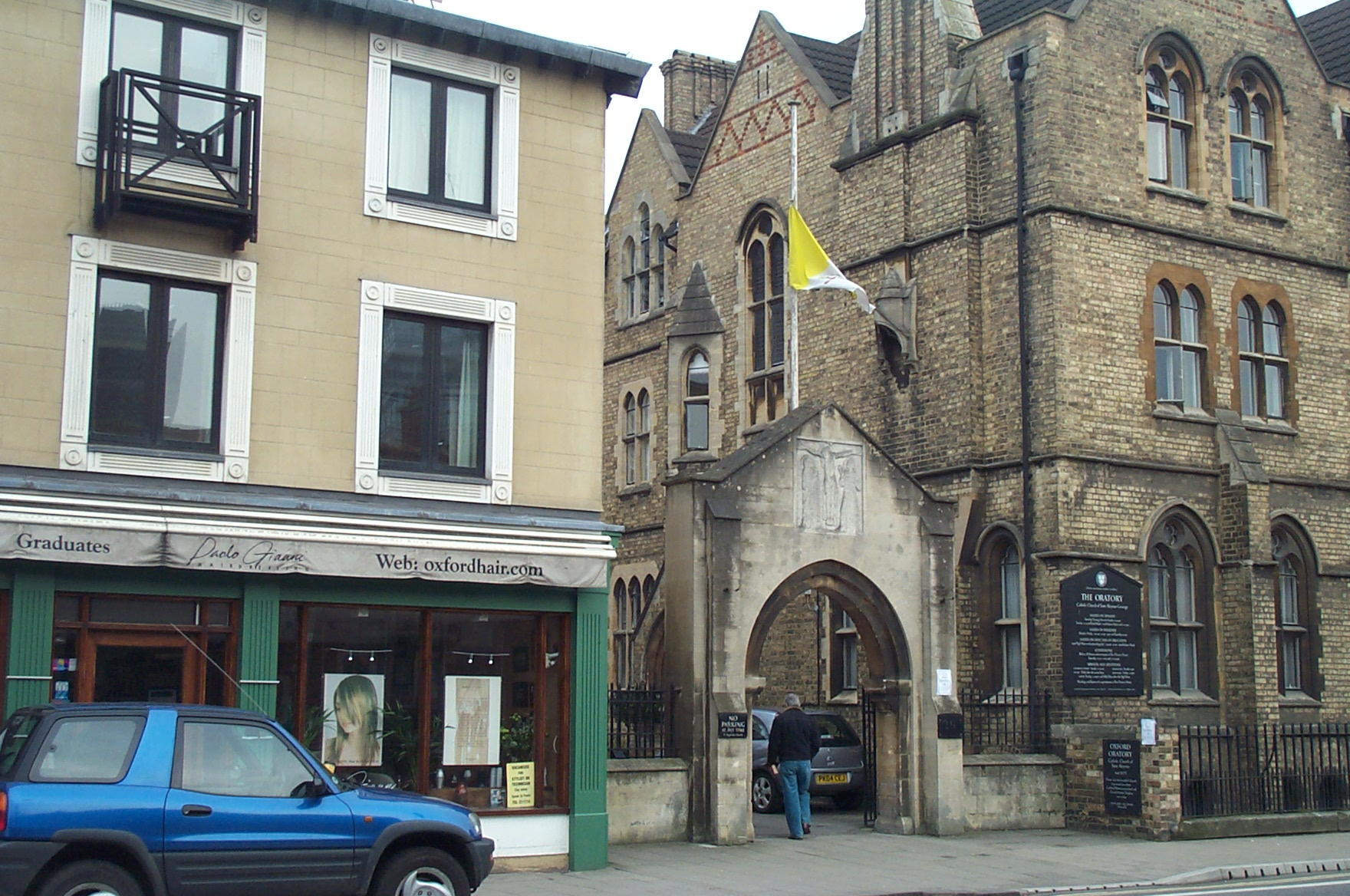
Flag of Vatican City flying at half-staff outside the Oxford Oratory on the day after the death of Pope John Paul II

Before 1808, the Papal States commonly used a bicolor, yellow-red flag, which was derived from the colours of the Holy See's coat of arms, as well as being the two traditional colours of the Senate and the Roman people. In 1798, Napoleon established the Roman Republic, which introduced a black, white, and red flag; after the Papal rule was restored, Pope Pius VII restored the Papal cockade, which was described as red and yellow.

In 1808, Pope Pius VII ordered the Vatican's Noble Guard and other troops to replace red color with white, in order to distinguish them from the troops that had been incorporated into Napoleon's army.

In 1803, the Papal States started using a white merchant flag with the Papal coat of arms in the centre. This flag was made official on 7 June 1815. On 17 September 1825, it was replaced with a yellow and white flag which took its colours from the materials of the two keys (yellow for gold, white for silver). These colors were probably taken from the 1808 flag of the Palatine guard. This was the first bicolour used by the Papal States and the ancestor of the modern flag of Vatican City. The merchant flag also served as a state flag on land.

Starting in 1831, the papal infantry flew square yellow and white flags. At first, they were diagonally divided, but after 1849 they were vertically divided like the merchant flag. The last infantry colour, adopted in 1862, was a plain square white and yellow flag.

On 8 February 1849, while Pope Pius IX was in exile in Gaeta, a Roman Republic was declared. The new government's flag was the Italian tricolor with the motto "Dio e Popolo" on the central stripe. The papal government and its flags were restored on 2 July 1849. On 20 September 1870, the Papal States were conquered by Italy.

After the Lateran Treaty was signed in 1929, papal authorities decided to use the 1825–1870 merchant flag as the state flag of the soon to be independent Vatican City state. The treaty came into effect on 7 June 1929.

=== Previous versions ===
Flag of the Papal States until 1808

Flag of the Papal States between 1803 and 1825

Flag of the Papal States in periods 1825–1849 and 1849–1870

Flag of the Papal States used between 1862 and 1870

Flag of the Papal States that flew over Porta Pia during the fall of Rome in 1870

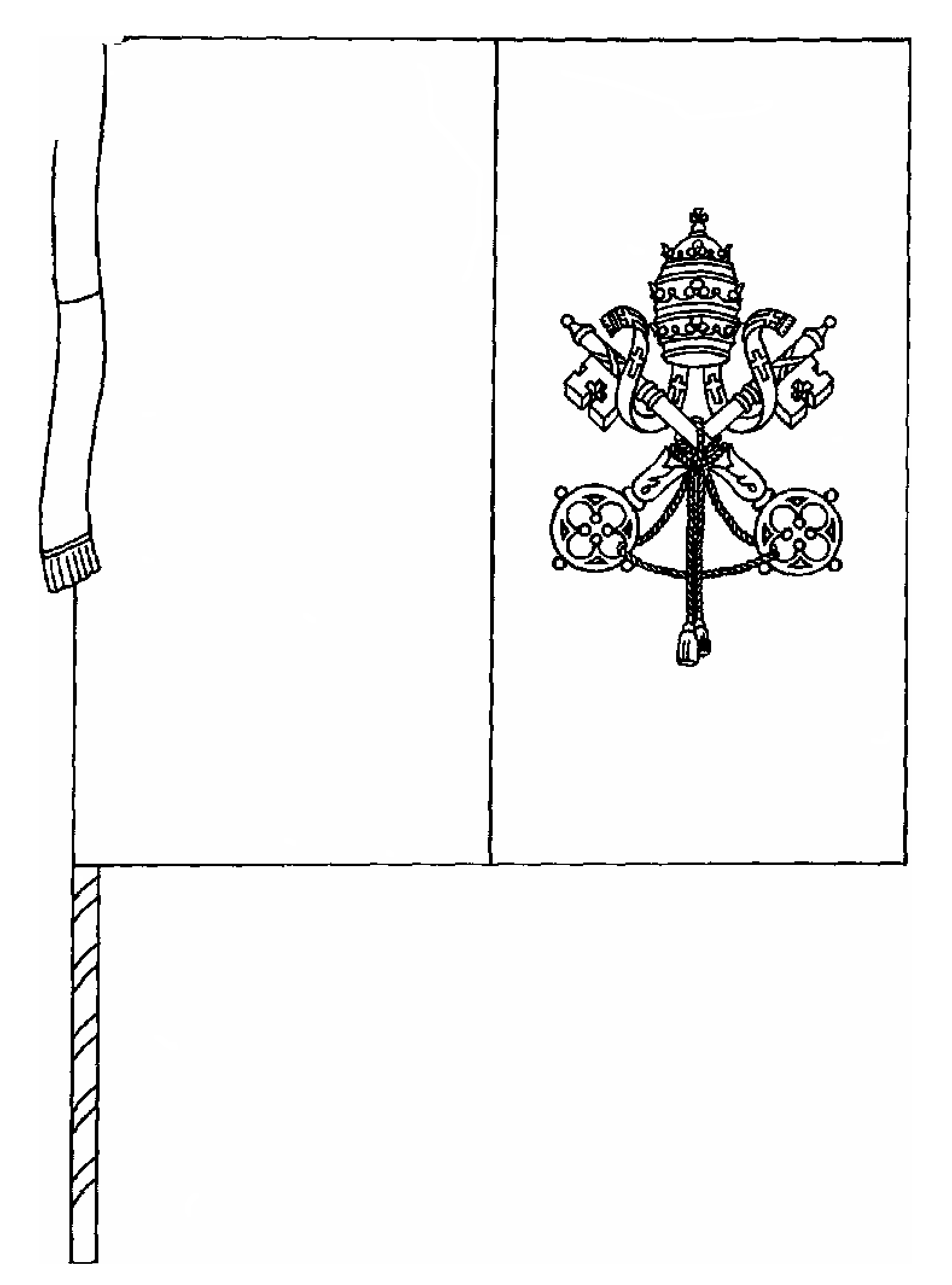
Flag of Vatican City from 1929 to 2001 as depicted in the 1929 Fundamental Law of the Vatican City State

Flag of Vatican City from 1929 to 2001

Flag of Vatican City from 2001 to 2023

== Raising of the flag at the United Nations ==
Since September 2015, the United Nations headquarters has begun displaying the flags of UN observer states alongside the 193 member state flags. On 25 September 2015, the flag of the Holy See was raised for the first time at the UN headquarters.

== Incorrect version ==
Image of the incorrect version from 2017 to 2022.

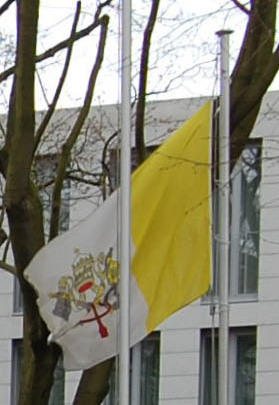
Incorrect flag with the lining of the tiara colored red, in use at the Apostolic Nunciature to Germany in Berlin

An incorrect version of the flag has been commonly used. In this version, the visible inner lining of the papal tiara is colored red instead of white, and a different shade of yellow or gold is used in some portions of the coat of arms. This version was popularized on the Internet due to a depiction of the Vatican flag used on Wikimedia Commons between 2006 and 2007 and between 2017 and 2022; however, the error predates the Commons file.

== Controversies ==
During Pope Francis's 2018 visit to Ireland, the South Dublin County Council refused to fly the Vatican flag; a local petrol station began to fly the flag in response.

A Police Scotland list of flags which could be a criminal offence to display "in a threatening manner" included the Vatican flag; sectarianism is common in Scotland, especially in Glasgow, and the Vatican flag could supposedly be flown as a sign of Catholic identity to intimidate Protestant neighbours.

== See also ==
- List of flags of the Papacy
- History of Christian flags
- Christian Flag
- Index of Vatican City-related articles
