= Antidisestablishmentarianism =

Political movement in the UK

Arms of the See of Canterbury, governing the Church of England

Antidisestablishmentarianism (/ˌæntidɪsɪˌstæblɪʃmənˈtɛəriənɪzəm/ AN-tee-disih-STAB-lish-mən-TAIR-ee-ə-nih-zəm, US also /ˌæntaɪ-/ ANTY-) is the position that a state church (the "established church") should not be disestablished (i.e., be separated from the state).

In 19th century Britain, it developed as a political movement in opposition to disestablishmentarianism, the Liberal Party's efforts to disestablish or remove the Church of England as the official state church of England, Ireland, and Wales. The Church's status has been kept in England, but in Ireland, the Anglican Church of Ireland was disestablished in 1871. In Wales, four Church of England dioceses were disestablished in 1920 and became the Church in Wales. In colonial America, the Church of England was disestablished in six colonies despite its mild popularity in the 1780s; many Anglicans in America began to call themselves Episcopalians.

== History ==
The matter of disestablishment of the Church of England is an ongoing issue, often tied with the position of the Monarchy of the United Kingdom as "Supreme Governor" of the Church (see Act of Settlement 1701).

British philosopher Phillip Blond, an advocate of the antidisestablishmentarian position, argues that England's having a state church has prevented the country from embracing any sort of ethnic or racial nationalism. Blond has stated that official patronage of the Church of England has allowed the country to withstand and speak against totalitarian ideologies of the 20th century that were plaguing other parts of the world. He further opined that "Just as we need the church to protect the political, so we need it to protect the idea of civil society." Blond concludes that the "church establishment in England creates a more diverse political and social life, prevents religious extremism and helps to minimise partisan conflict and secular violence." Giles Coren, a British writer, supports antidisestablishmentarianism because it allows all English people to receive meaningful rites such as marriage.

In April 2014, Nick Clegg, then Deputy Prime Minister of the United Kingdom and Leader of the Liberal Democrats, said that he thought the Church of England and the British state should be separated "in the long run". David Cameron, the prime minister of the United Kingdom at the time, responded to Clegg's comments by stating that the position was "a long-term Liberal idea, but it is not a Conservative one", adding that he believed the existence of an established church is beneficial.

== See also ==
- Accommodationism – Philosophical and legal view accepting both religious and rationalist/irreligious views
- Christian amendment – Proposed constitutional amendments
- Christian nationalism – Christian ideology espousing religious nationalism
- Christian state – State which endorses Christianity as the state religion
- Constitutional references to God
- History of Christian flags – Field of vexillological history
- National church – Christian church associated with a specific ethnic group or nation state
- Separation of church and state – Principle to separate religious and civil institutions
- Theonomy – Christian form of government ruled by divine law
- Longest word in English

== General and cited references ==
- Adrian Hastings, Church and State: the English Experience (Exeter: University of Exeter Press, 1991.)
