= Christian state =

State which endorses Christianity as the state religion

A Christian state is a country that recognizes a form of Christianity as its official religion and often has a state church (also called an established church), which is a Christian denomination that supports the government and is supported by the government. A Christian state stands in contrast to a secular state, an atheist state, or another religious state, such as a Jewish state, or an Islamic state.

Historically, the nations of Armenia, Aksum, Makuria, and the Holy Roman Empire have declared themselves as Christian states, as well as the Roman Empire and its continuation the Byzantine Empire, the Russian Empire, the Spanish Empire, the British Empire, the Portuguese Empire, and the Frankish Empire, the Belgian colonial empire, the French empire. Today, several nations officially identify themselves as Christian states or have state churches. These countries include Argentina, Armenia, Costa Rica, El Salvador, Denmark (incl. Greenland and the Faroes), England, Dominican Republic, Georgia, Greece, Hungary, Iceland, Liechtenstein, Malta, Monaco, Samoa, Tonga, Tuvalu, Vatican City, and Zambia. The laws of various Christian countries, such as those of Denmark, Norway, and Sweden, even require their monarch to be a Christian (usually of a particular denomination, such as Evangelical Lutheranism).

== History ==
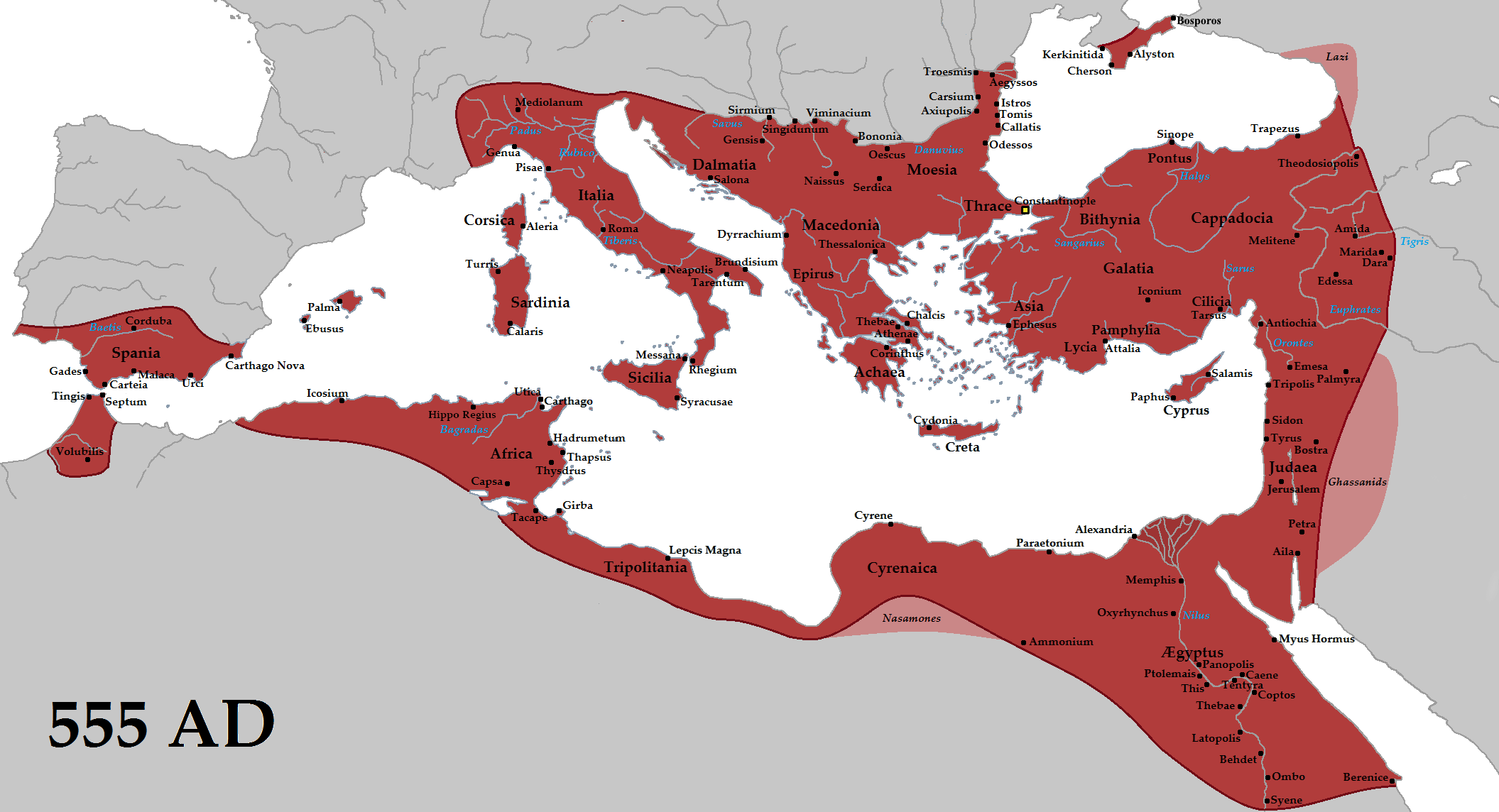
The boundaries of the Eastern Roman Empire under Justinian the Great

The Armenian Apostolic Church traces its origins to the apostolic era, asserting apostolic succession from the apostles Bartholomew and Thaddeus (Jude). The formal establishment of Christianity as the state religion of Armenia is traditionally dated to 301 AD, during the reign of Tiridates III, following his conversion by Gregory the Illuminator. This makes Armenia the first nation to adopt Christianity as a state religion, although the exact date has been subject to scholarly debate. In 380, three Roman emperors issued the Edict of Thessalonica (Cunctos populos), making the Roman Empire a Christian state, and establishing Nicene Christianity, in the form of its State Church, as its official religion.

After the fall of the Western Roman Empire in the late 5th century, the Eastern Roman Empire under the emperor Justinian (reigned 527–565), became the world's predominant Christian state, based on Roman law, Greek culture, and the Greek language." In this Christian state, in which nearly all of its subjects upheld faith in Jesus, an "enormous amount of artistic talent was poured into the construction of churches, church ceremonies, and church decoration". John Binns describes this era, writing that:

A new stage in the history of the Church began when not just localised communities but nations became Christian. The stage is associated with the conversion of Constantine and the beginnings of a Christian Empire, but the Byzantine Emperor was not the first ruler to lead his people into Christianity, thus setting up the first Christian state. That honour traditionally goes to the church of Armenia.

— John Binns, An Introduction to the Christian Orthodox Churches

As a Christian state, Armenia "embraced Christianity as the religion of the King, the nobles, and the people". In 326, according to official tradition of the Georgian Orthodox Church, following the conversion of Mirian and Nana, the country of Georgia became a Christian state, the Emperor Constantine the Great sending clerics for baptising people. In the 4th century, in the Kingdom of Aksum, after Ezana's conversion to the faith, this empire also became a Christian state.

In the Middle Ages, efforts were made in order to establish a Pan-Christianity state by uniting the countries within Christendom. Christian nationalism played a role in this era in which Christians felt the impulse to also recover those territories in which Christianity historically flourished, such as the Holy Land and North Africa.

The First Great Awakening, American Revolution, and Second Great Awakening caused two rounds of disestablishment among the states of the new United States, from 1776 to 1833.

== Modern era ==
Countries with Christianity as their state religion are in blue.

=== Argentina ===
Article 2 of the Constitution of Argentina explicitly states that "the Federal Government supports the Roman Catholic Apostolic Faith" and Article 14 guarantees freedom of religion. Although it enforces neither an official nor a state faith, it gives Catholic Christianity a preferential status. Before its 1994 amendment, the Constitution stated that the President of the Republic must be a Roman Catholic.

=== Armenia ===
In Armenia, Christianity is the most adhered religion, it has massive significance, but it is not the state religion. The Armenian Apostolic Church is the national church, it has long kept the Armenian identity alive under various Empires. Armenia is the first country which recognised Christianity as a state religion.

=== Costa Rica ===
The constitution of Costa Rica states that "The Catholic and Apostolic Religion is the religion of the State". As such, Catholic Christian holy days are recognized by the government and "public schools provide religious education", although parents are able to opt-out their children if they choose to do so.

=== Denmark ===
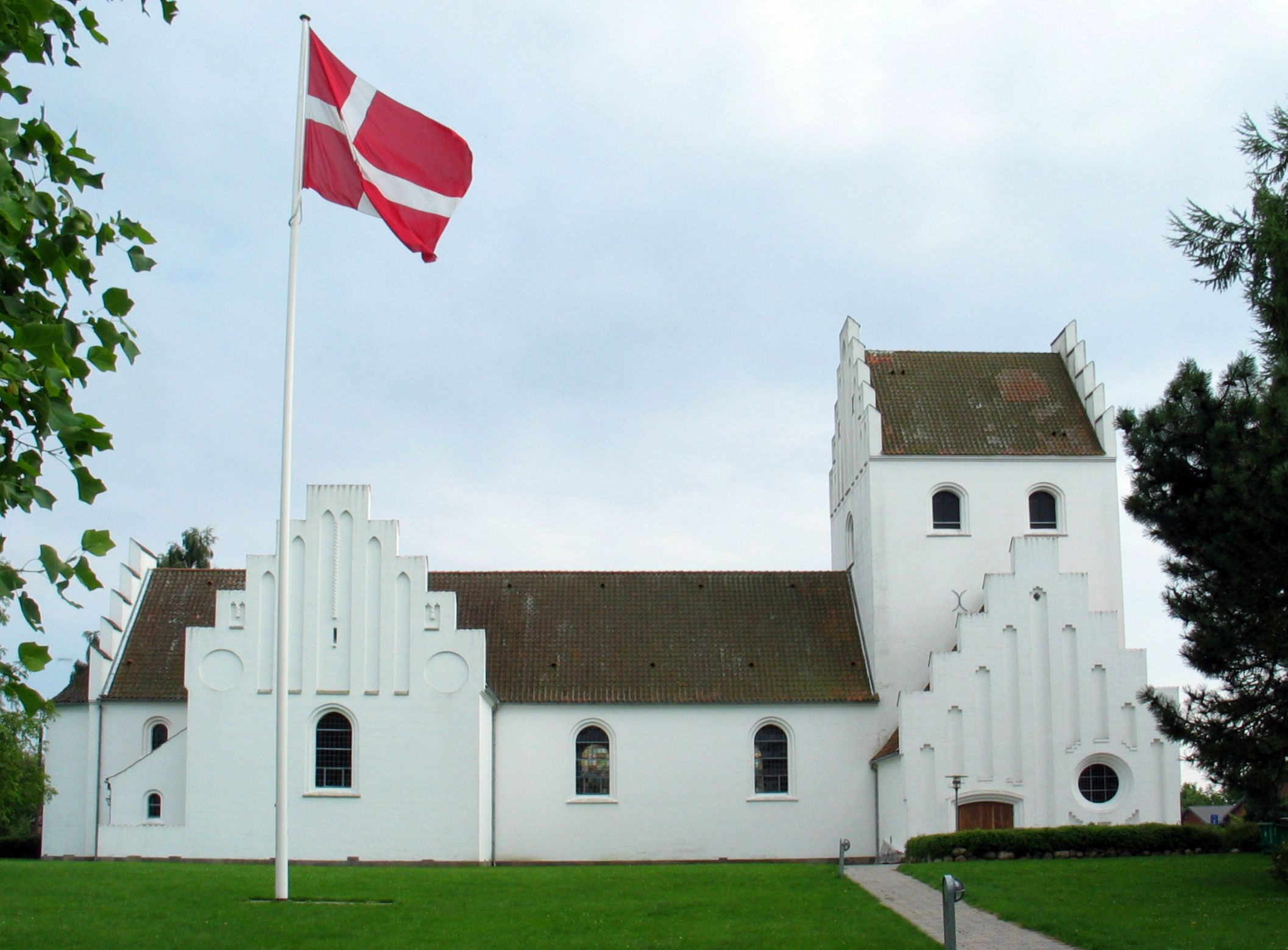
A Church of Denmark parish church in Holte, with the Dannebrog flying in its kirkyard

As early as the 11th century AD, "Denmark was considered to be a Christian state", with the Church of Denmark, a member of the Lutheran World Federation, being the state church. Prof. Wasif Shadid, of Leiden University, writes that:

The Lutheran established church is a department of the state. Church affairs are governed by a central government ministry, while clergy are government employees. The registration of births, deaths and marriages falls under this ministry of church affairs, and normally speaking the local Lutheran pastor is also the official registrar.

— W. A. R. Shadid, Religious Freedom and the Position of Islam in Western Europe, page 11

Over 82% of the population of Denmark are members of the Evangelical Lutheran Church of Denmark, which is "officially headed by the queen of Denmark". The Act of Succession specifies that monarch "shall be a member of the Evangelical Church." Furthermore, clergy "in the Church of Denmark are civil servants employed by the Ministry of Ecclesiastical Affairs" and the "economic base of the Church of Denmark is state-collected church taxes combined with a direct state subsidiary (12%), which symbolically covers the expenses of the Church of Denmark to run the civil registration and the burial system for all citizens."

=== England ===
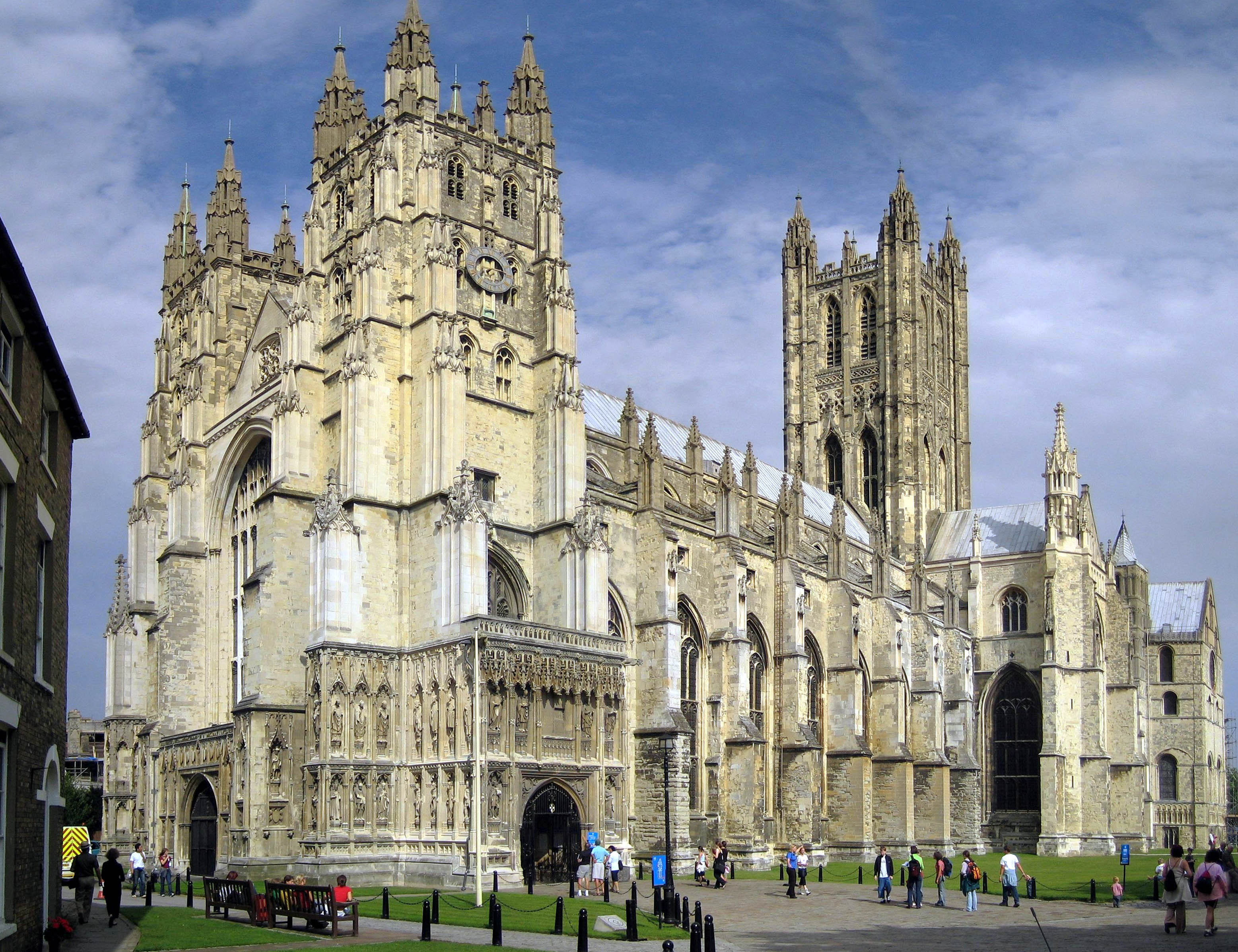
Canterbury Cathedral houses the cathedra of the Archbishop of Canterbury, the primus inter pares of the worldwide Anglican Communion.

Barbara Yorke writes that the "Carolingian Renaissance heightened appreciation within England of the role of king and church in a Christian state." As such,

Since the 1701 Act of Establishment, England's official state church has been the Church of England, the monarch being its supreme governor and 'defender of the faith'. He, together with Parliament, has a say in appointing bishops, twenty-six of whom have ex officio seats in the House of Lords. In characteristically British fashion, where the state is representative of civil society, it was Parliament that determined, in the Act of Establishment, that the monarch had to be Anglican.

— Christian Joppke, page 1

Christian religious education is taught to children in primary and secondary schools in the United Kingdom. English schools have a legal requirement for a daily act of collective worship "of a broadly Christian character" that is widely flouted.

=== Dominican Republic ===
The Dominican Republic is a Christian state, with Catholic Christianity being the official religion. In view of the same, the government of the Dominican Republic extends special privileges to the Catholic Church. National holidays include holy days of Christianity, such as the Epiphany (January 6), Good Friday, Corpus Christi, and Christmas Day. In the Dominican Republic, religious education classes must be of either a Catholic or evangelical Protestant basis and are required be taught in all elementary and secondary public schools.

=== Faroe Islands ===
The Church of the Faroe Islands is the state church of Faroe Islands.

=== Georgia ===
Georgia is one of the oldest Christian states. Article 8 of Georgian Constitution and the Concordat of 2002 grants the Georgian Orthodox Church special privileges, which include legal immunity to the Patriarch of Georgia. The Orthodox Church is the most trusted institution in the country and its head, Patriarch Ilia II, the most trusted person.

=== Greece ===
Greece is a Christian state, with the Church of Greece playing "a dominant role in the life of the country".

Mount Athos and most of the Athos peninsula are governed as an autonomous region in Greece by the monastic community of Mount Athos, which is ecclesiastically under the direct jurisdiction of the Ecumenical Patriarch of Constantinople.

=== Greenland ===
Being an autonomous constituent country within the Kingdom of Denmark, the Church of Denmark is the established church of Greenland through the Constitution of Denmark:

The Evangelical Lutheran Church shall be the Established Church of Denmark, and, as such, it shall be supported by the State.

— Section IV of Constitution of Denmark

This applies toof the Kingdom of Denmark, except for the Faroe Islands, as the Church of the Faroe Islands became independent in 2007.

=== Hungary ===
The preamble to the Hungarian Constitution of 2011 describes Hungary as "part of Christian Europe" and acknowledges "the role of Christianity in preserving nationhood", while Article VII provides that "the State shall cooperate with the Churches for community goals". However, the constitution also guarantees freedom of religion and separation of church and state.

=== Iceland ===
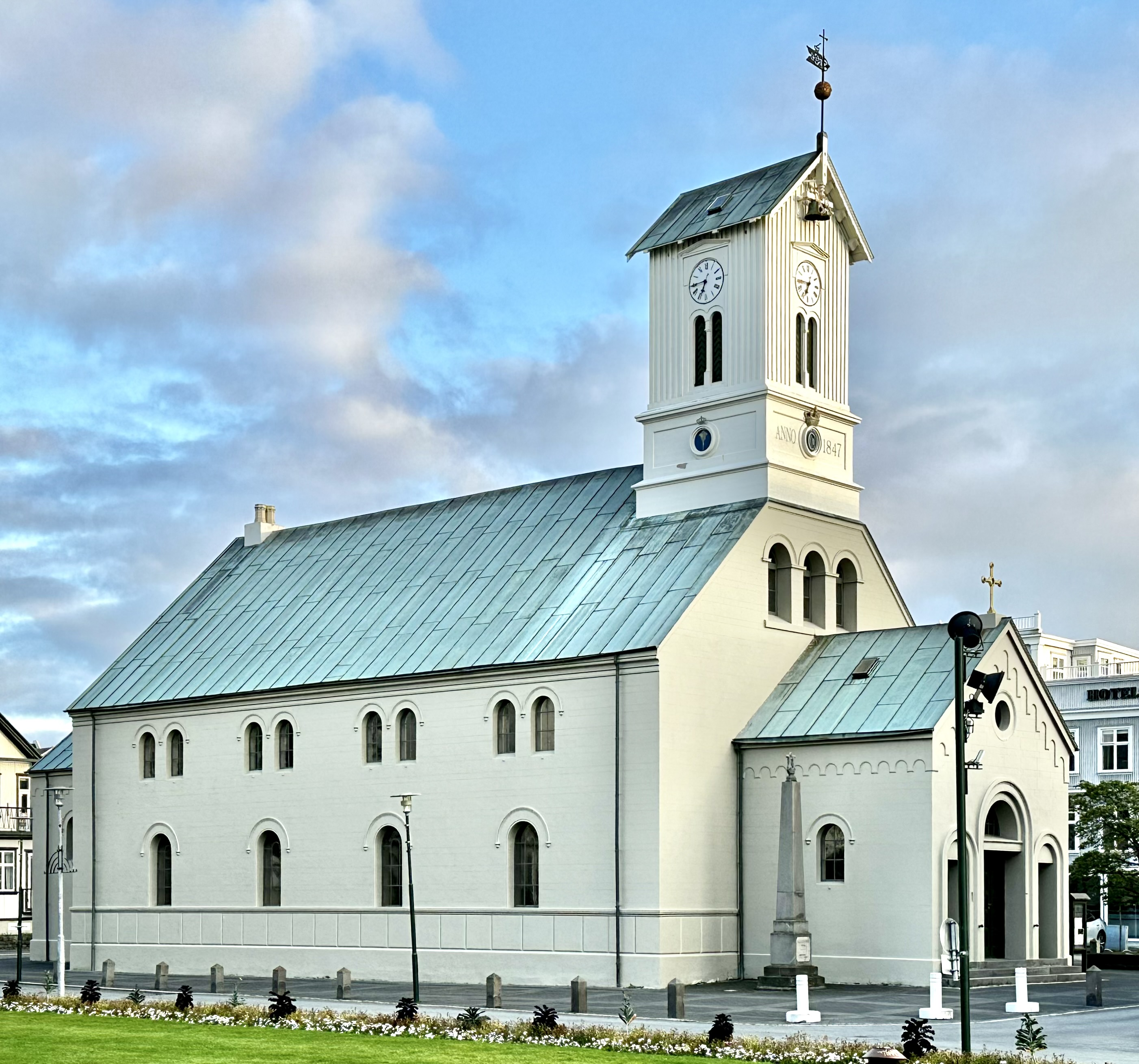
Reykjavík Cathedral, mother Church of the Evangelical Lutheran Church of Iceland

Around AD 1000, Iceland became a Christian state. The Encyclopedia of Protestantism states that:

The majority of Icelanders are members of the state church. Almost all children are baptized as Lutheran and more than 90 percent are subsequently confirmed. The church conducts 75 percent of all marriages and 99 percent of all funerals. The Evangelical Lutheran Church in Iceland is a member of the Lutheran World Federation and the World Council of Churches.

— J. Gordon Melton, Encyclopedia of Protestantism, page 283

All public schools have mandatory education in Christianity, although an exemption may be considered by the Minister of Education.

=== Liechtenstein ===
Liechtenstein's constitution designates the Catholic Church as being the state Church of that country. In public schools, per article 16 of the Constitution of Liechtenstein, religious education is given by Church authorities.

=== Malta ===
The Civil Ensign of Malta

Section Two of the Constitution of Malta specifies the state's religion as being the Roman Catholic Apostolic Religion. It holds that the "authorities of the Roman Catholic Apostolic Church have the duty to teach which principles are right and which are wrong" and that "religious teaching of the Roman Catholic Apostolic Faith shall be provided in all State schools as part of compulsory education".

=== Monaco ===
Article 9 of the Constitution of Monaco describes "La religion catholique, apostolique et romaine [the catholic, apostolic and Roman religion]" as the religion of the state.

=== Norway ===
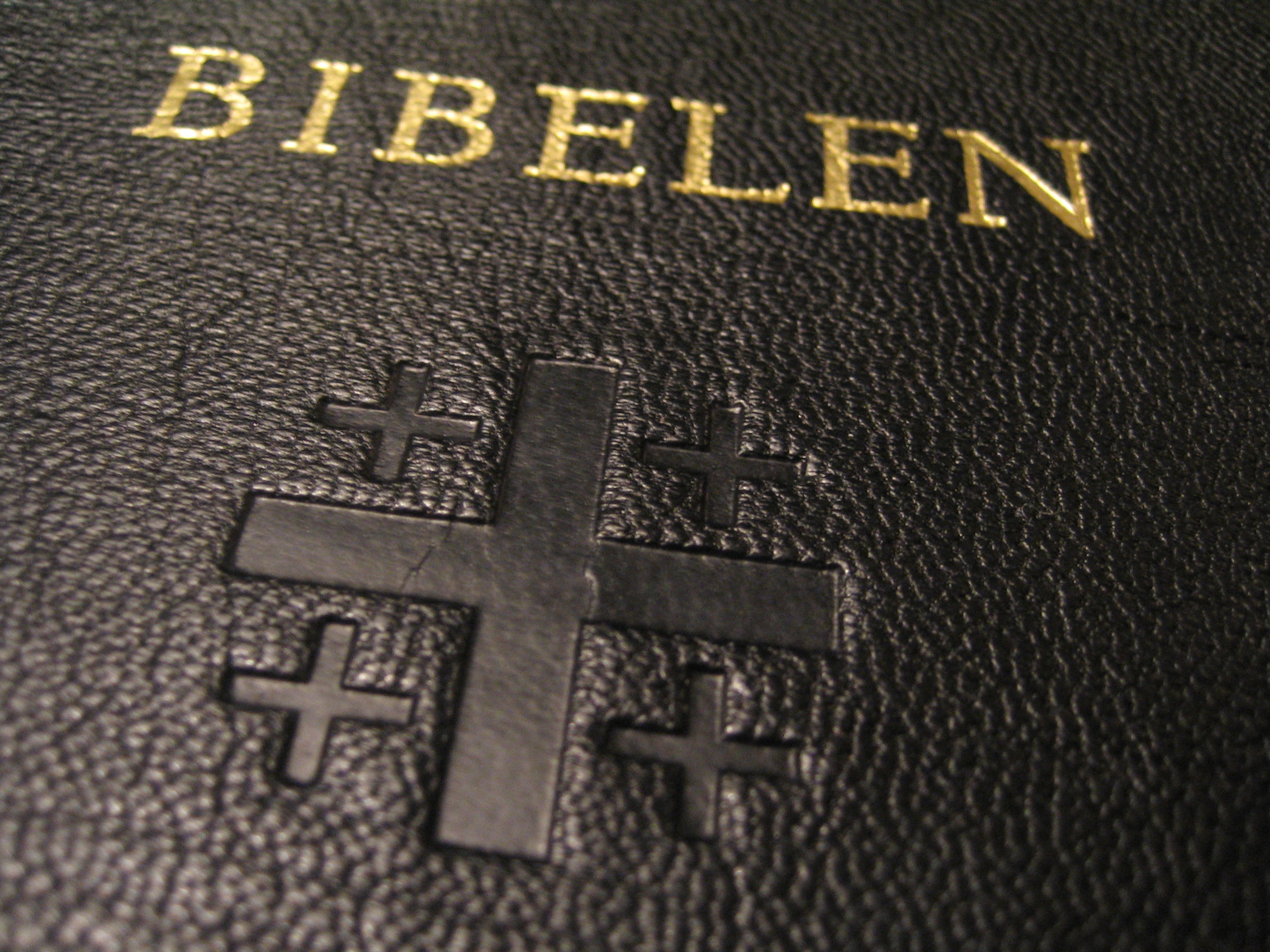
The Bible in the Norwegian language

Cole Durham and Tore Sam Lindholm, writing in 2013, stated that "For a period of one thousand years Norway has been a kingdom with a Christian state church" and that a decree went out in 1739 ordering that "Elementary schooling for all Norwegian children became mandatory, so that all Norwegians should be able to read the Bible and the Lutheran Catechism firsthand." The modern Constitution of Norway stipulates that "The Church of Norway, an Evangelical-Lutheran church, will remain the Established Church of Norway and will as such be supported by the State." As such, the "Norwegian constitution decrees that Lutheranism is the official religion of the State and that the King is the supreme temporal head of the Church." The administration of the Church "is shared between the Ministry for Church, Education and Research centrally and municipal authorities locally", and the Church of Norway "depends on state and local taxes". The Church of Norway is responsible for the "maintenance of church buildings and cemeteries". In the mid-20th century, the vast majority of Norwegians participated in the Lutheran Church. According to a 1957 description, "[o]ver 90 percent of the population are married by state church clergymen, have their children baptized and confirmed, and finally are buried with a church service." However, current membership in the Evangelical Lutheran Church of Norway is lower, standing at 65% of the population in 2021.

In 2017, the Church of Norway was made self-governing, with the identity of the denomination shifting from a state church to a national church. The Church of Norway continues to be supported by public funding. Succession rules governing the Monarchy of Norway require that the monarch be an Evangelical Lutheran holding membership in the Church of Norway. Those who marry into the royal family of Norway are expected to be or become Evangelical Lutherans.

=== Samoa ===
Samoa became a Christian state in 2017. Article 1 of the Samoan Constitution states that “Samoa is a Christian nation founded of God the Father, the Son and the Holy Spirit”.

=== Sweden ===
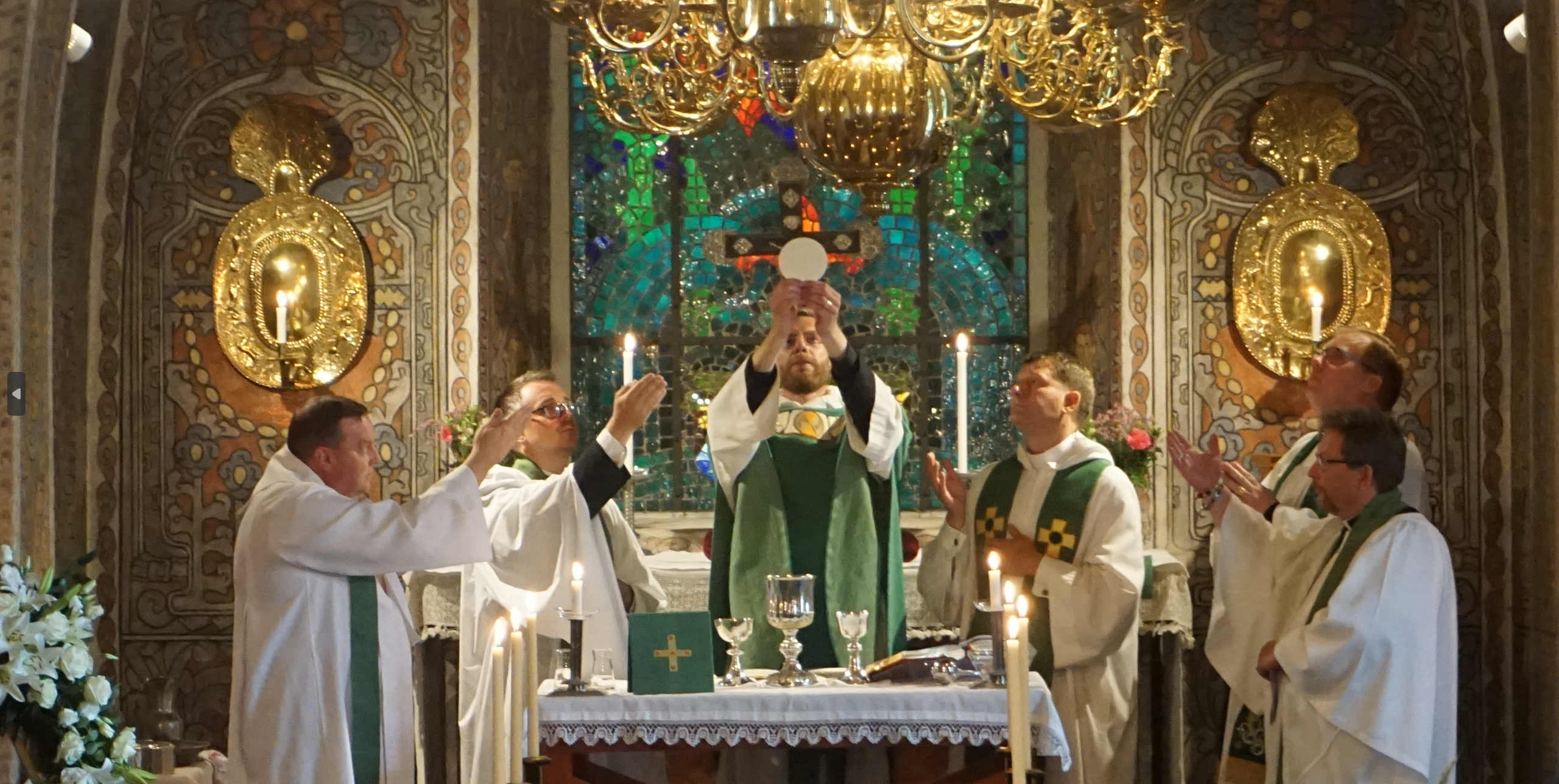
Lutheran priest elevating the host during the offering of the Mass at Alsike Church, Sweden

Under the reign of Gustav Vasa, Sweden became an Evangelical-Lutheran Christian country. The Protestant Reformation in Sweden was led by the Evangelical-Lutheran divines Olaus Petri and Laurentius Petri. Laurentius Petri was consecrated in the apostolic succession that, according to the Swedish Church Ordinance 1571 "must remain in the future, so long as the world lasts." In 1544, the Parliament in Västerås declared Sweden to be an Evangelical-Lutheran kingdom. The Kyrkogångsplikt was the legal obligation for Swedish citizens to attend Mass every Lord's Day in the Evangelical Lutheran church. The Evangelical-Lutheran Church of Sweden historically served as the state church, though in 2000, this relationship was loosened; "the Church of Sweden is still legally regulated by the state, and the monarch must be a member and assent to its theology." The Swedish Act of Succession requires monarchs to "profess the pure evangelical faith".

=== Tonga ===
Tonga became a Christian state under George Tupou I in the 19th century, with the Free Wesleyan Church, a member of the World Methodist Council, being established as the country's state Church. Under the rule of George Tupou I, there was established a "rigorous constitutional clause regulating observation of the Sabbath".

=== Tuvalu ===
The Church of Tuvalu, a Calvinist church in the Congregationalist tradition, is the state church of Tuvalu and was established as such in 1991. The Constitution of Tuvalu identifies Tuvalu as "an independent State based on Christian principles".

=== Vatican City ===
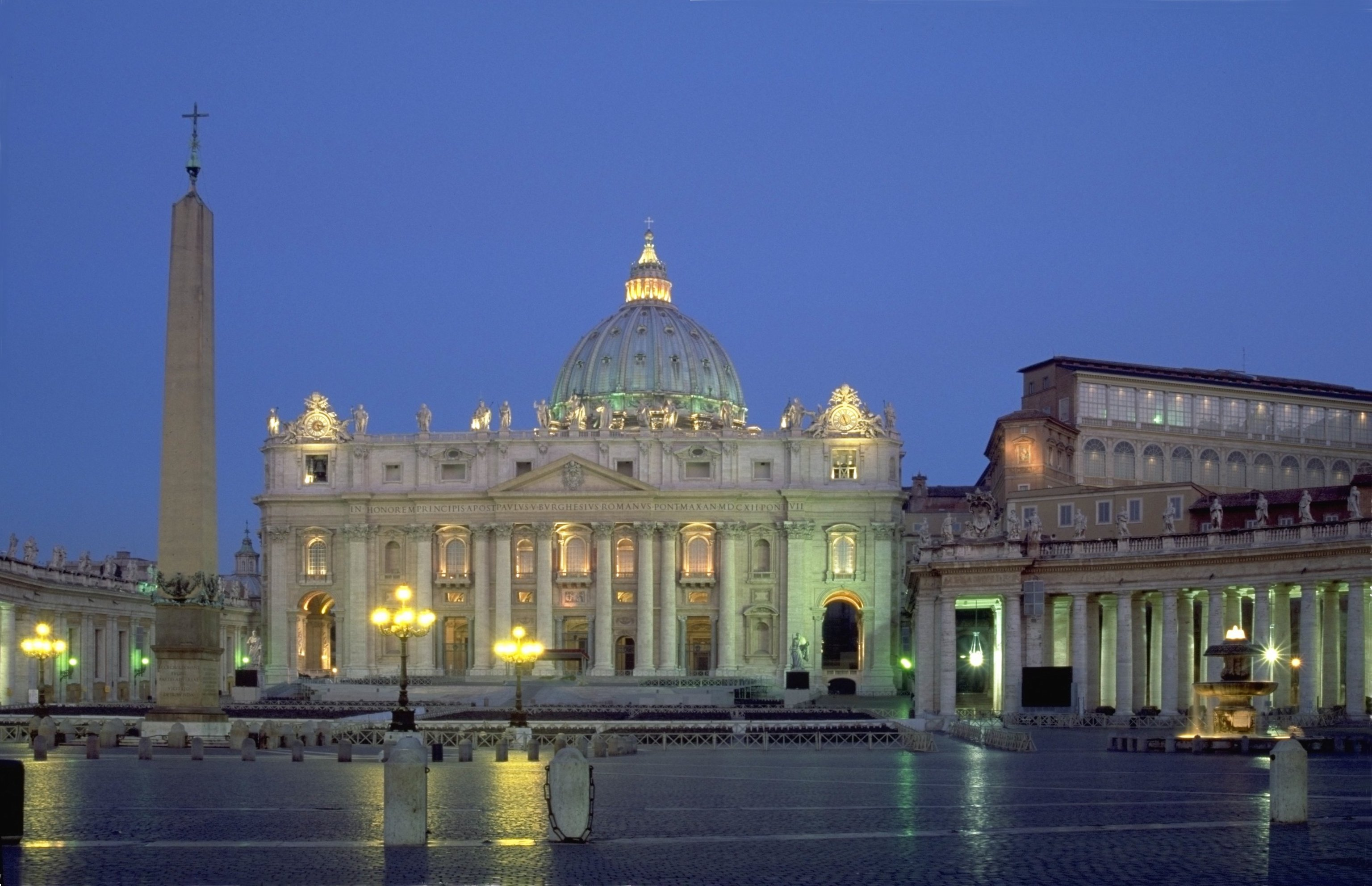
St. Peter's Square, Vatican City

Vatican City is a Christian state, in which the "Pope is ex officio simultaneously leader of the Catholic Church as well as Head of State and Head of the Government of the State of the Vatican City; he also possesses (de jure) absolute authority over the legislative, executive and judicial branches."

=== Zambia ===
Jeroen Temperman, a professor of international law at Erasmus University Rotterdam writes that:

Zambia is officially a Christian state as well, though the legal ramifications clearly do not compare to the latter state. The Preamble of the Constitution of Zambia establishes Zambia as a Christian state without specifying "Christian" denominationally. It simply proclaims: "We, the people of Zambia...declare the Republic a Christian nation..." As far as state practice is concerned, it may be pointed out that the Government maintains relations with the Zambian Council of Churches and requires Christianity to be taught in the public school curriculum.

— Jeroen Temperman, State-Religion Relationships and Human Rights Law, page 18

After "Zambia declared itself a Christian nation in 1991", "the nation's vice president urged citizens to 'have a Christian orientation in all fields, at all levels'."

== Established churches and former state churches ==
=== Current ===
Location	Church	Denomination	Notes
Denmark	Church of Denmark	Lutheran	
England	Church of England	Anglican	The monarchy of the United Kingdom doubles as the Supreme Governor of the Church of England
Faroe Islands	Church of the Faroe Islands	Lutheran	Elevated from a diocese of the Church of Denmark in 2007 (the two remain in close cooperation)
Greece	Greek Orthodox Church	Eastern Orthodox	The Church of Greece is recognized by the Greek Constitution as the "prevailing religion" in Greece. However, this provision does not give official status to the Church of Greece, while all other religions are recognized as equal and may be practiced freely.
Greenland	Church of Denmark	Lutheran	Under discussion to be elevated from The Diocese of Greenland in the Church of Denmark to a state church for Greenland, along-the-lines the Faroese Church took in 2007
Iceland	Lutheran Evangelical Church	Lutheran	
Liechtenstein	Catholic Church	Catholic	
Malta	Catholic Church	Catholic	
Monaco	Catholic Church	Catholic	
Nicaragua	Catholic Church	Catholic	
Tuvalu	Church of Tuvalu	Reformed	

=== Former ===
Location	Church	Denomination	Disestablished
Anhalt	Evangelical State Church of Anhalt	United Protestant	1918, during the German Revolution
Armenia	Armenian Apostolic Church	Oriental Orthodox	1921
Austria	Catholic Church	Catholic	1918, under the Federal Constitutional Law
Baden	Catholic Church	Catholic	1918, during the German Revolution
Baden	United Evangelical Protestant State Church of Baden	United Protestant	1918, during the German Revolution
Bavaria	Catholic Church	Catholic	1918, during the German Revolution
Bavaria	Protestant State Church in the Kingdom of Bavaria right of the Rhine	Lutheran and Reformed	1918, during the German Revolution
Bavaria	United Protestant Evangelical Christian Church of the Palatinate	United Protestant	1918, during the German Revolution
Bolivia	Catholic Church	Catholic	2009, under the Constitution of Bolivia
Brazil (Note: Brazilian Laws - the Federal Constitution - The Organization of State. V-brazil.com. Retrieved 5 May 2012. Brazil had Roman Catholicism as the state religion from the country's independence, in 1822, until the fall of the Brazilian Empire. The new Republican government passed, in 1890, Decree 119-A "Decreto 119-A". "Prohibits federal and state authorities to intervene on religion, granting freedom of religion." (still in force), instituting the separation of church and state for the first time in Brazilian law. Positivist thinker Demétrio Nunes Ribeiro urged the new government to adopt this stance. The 1891 Constitution, the first under the Republican system of government, abolished privileges for any specific religion, reaffirming the separation of church and state. This has been the case ever since – the 1988 Constitution of Brazil, currently in force, does so in its Nineteenth Article. The Preamble to the Constitution does refer to "God's protection" over the document's promulgation, but this is not legally taken as endorsement of belief in any deity.)	Roman Catholic Church	Catholic	1890
Brunswick	Evangelical Lutheran State Church in Brunswick	Lutheran	1918, during the German Revolution
Bulgaria	Bulgarian Orthodox Church	Eastern Orthodox	1946
Chile	Catholic Church	Catholic	1925
Colombia	Catholic Church	Catholic	1991
Croatia (Note: Axis-aligned puppet state under Nazi Germany and Fascist Italy)	Catholic Church	Catholic	1945
Connecticut	Congregational Church	Reformed	1818, under the Constitution of Connecticut
Cuba	Catholic Church	Catholic	1902
Cyprus	Cypriot Orthodox Church	Eastern Orthodox	1977, with the death of the Ethnarch Makarios III
Czechoslovakia	Catholic Church	Catholic	1920, under the Czechoslovak Constitution
East Florida	Church of England	Anglican	1783
Ethiopia	Ethiopian Orthodox Church	Oriental Orthodox	1974, after the formation of the Derg
Finland	Evangelical Lutheran Church of Finland	Lutheran	1869, however the organisation of the Evangelical Lutheran Church of Finland is regulated by the Constitution of Finland and Church Act of 1993. The state also carries out taxing for the funding of the church on its members.
Finland	Finnish Orthodox Church	Eastern Orthodox	1917
France (Note: In France the Concordat of 1801 made the Catholic, Calvinist and Lutheran churches state-sponsored religions, as well as Judaism.)	Catholic Church	Catholic	1905, under the law on the Separation of the Churches and the State
Georgia (country)	Georgian Orthodox Church	Eastern Orthodox	1921
Guatemala	Catholic Church	Catholic	1871
Haiti	Catholic Church	Catholic	1987
Hawaii	Church of Hawaii	Anglican	1893, after the overthrow of the Hawaiian Kingdom
Hesse	Evangelical Church in Hesse	United Protestant	1918, during the German Revolution
Hungary (Note: In Hungary the constitutional laws of 1848 declared five established churches on equal status: the Catholic, Calvinist, Lutheran, Eastern Orthodox and Unitarian Church. In 1868 the law was ratified again after the Ausgleich. In 1895 Judaism was also recognized as the sixth established church. In 1948 every distinction between the different denominations were abolished.)	Roman Catholic Church	Catholic	1946
Ireland (Note: In the Kingdom of Ireland the Church of Ireland was established in the Reformation. The Act of Union 1800 created the United Kingdom of Great Britain and Ireland with the United Church of England and Ireland established outside Scotland. The Irish Church Act 1869 demerged and disestablished the Church of Ireland, and the island was partitioned in 1922.)	Church of Ireland	Anglican	1871
Republic of Ireland (Note: The Republic of Ireland's 1937 constitution prohibits an established religion. Originally, it recognized the "special position" of the Catholic Church "as the guardian of the Faith professed by the great majority of the citizens", and recognized "the Church of Ireland, the Presbyterian Church in Ireland, the Methodist Church in Ireland, the Religious Society of Friends in Ireland, as well as the Jewish Congregations and the other religious denominations existing in Ireland at the date of the coming into operation of this Constitution". These provisions were deleted in 1973.)	Catholic Church	Catholic	1973
Italy	Catholic Church	Catholic	1985, see Lateran Treaty § After 1946
Lippe	Church of Lippe	Reformed	1918
Lithuania	Catholic Church	Catholic	1940
Lübeck	Evangelical Lutheran Church in the State of Lübeck	Lutheran	1918
Luxembourg	Catholic Church	Catholic	Not an official state church
North Macedonia	Macedonian Orthodox Church	Eastern Orthodox	1921
Mecklenburg-Schwerin	Evangelical Lutheran State Church of Mecklenburg-Schwerin	Lutheran	1918
Mecklenburg-Strelitz	Mecklenburg-Strelitz State Church	Lutheran	1918
Mexico	Catholic Church	Catholic	1857, under the Federal Constitution (reestablished between 1864 and 1867)
Netherlands	Dutch Reformed Church	Reformed	1795
New Netherland	Reformed Church in America	Reformed	1674 (colony surrendered to English rule)
New Brunswick	Church of England	Anglican	1850
Norway	Church of Norway	Lutheran	2017, by legislation
Nova Scotia	Church of England	Anglican	1850
Oldenburg	Evangelical Lutheran Church of Oldenburg	Lutheran	1918
Panama	Catholic Church	Catholic	1904
Paraguay	Catholic Church	Catholic	1992
Peru	Catholic Church	Catholic	1993, under the Constitution of Peru
Philippines (Note: The Philippines was among several possessions ceded by Spain to the United States in 1898; religious freedom was subsequently guaranteed in the archipelago. This was codified in the Philippine Organic Act (1902), section 5: "... That no law shall be made respecting an establishment of religion or prohibiting the free exercise thereof, and that the free exercise and enjoyment of religious profession and worship, without discrimination or preference, shall forever be allowed." A similarly worded provision still exists in the present Constitution. Catholicism remains the predominant religion, wielding considerable political and cultural influence.)	Catholic Church	Catholic	1898
Poland (Note: Article 25 of the constitution states: "1. Churches and other religious organizations shall have equal rights. 2. Public authorities in the Republic of Poland shall be impartial in matters of personal conviction". Article 114 of the Polish March Constitution of 1921 declared the Catholic Church to hold "the principal position among religious denominations equal before the law" (in reference to the idea of first among equals). The article was continued in force by article 81 of the April Constitution of 1935. The Soviet-backed PKWN Manifesto of 1944 reintroduced the March Constitution, which remained in force until it was replaced by the Small Constitution of 1947.)	Catholic Church	Catholic	1947
Portugal	Catholic Church	Catholic	1911
Prince Edward Island	Church of England	Anglican	1850
Georgia (US state)	Church of England	Anglican	1789
Province of Maryland	Church of England	Anglican	1776
Massachusetts	Congregational Church	Reformed	1834
New Hampshire	Church of England	Anglican	1877
North Carolina	Church of England	Anglican	1776
South Carolina	Church of England	Anglican	1790
Prussia pre-1866 provinces	Evangelical State Church of Prussia's older Provinces with nine ecclesiastical provinces	United Protestant	1918
Prussia; Province of Hanover	Evangelical Reformed State Church of the Province of Hanover	Reformed	1918
Prussia; Province of Hanover	Evangelical Lutheran State Church of Hanover	Lutheran	1918
Prussia; Province of Hesse-Nassau (partially)	Evangelical State Church of Frankfurt upon Main	United Protestant	1918
Prussia; Province of Hesse-Nassau (partially)	Evangelical Church of Kurhessen-Waldeck	United Protestant	1918
Prussia; Province of Hesse-Nassau (partially)	Evangelical State Church in Nassau	United Protestant	1918
Prussia; Province of Schleswig-Holstein	Evangelical Lutheran Church of Schleswig-Holstein	Lutheran	1918
Quebec	Catholic Church	Catholic	1960, after the Quiet Revolution
Romania	Romanian Orthodox Church	Eastern Orthodox	1947
Russia	Russian Orthodox Church	Eastern Orthodox	1917, after the Russian Revolution
Taiping Heavenly Kingdom	God Worshipping Society	God Worshipping Society	1864
Thuringia	church bodies in principalities which merged in Thuringia in 1920	Lutheran	1918
Saxony	Evangelical Lutheran State Church of Saxony	Lutheran	1918
Schaumburg-Lippe	Evangelical State Church of Schaumburg-Lippe	Lutheran	1918
Scotland	Church of Scotland	Presbyterian	State control disclaimed since 1638. Formally recognised as not an established church in 1921
Serbia	Serbian Orthodox Church	Eastern Orthodox	1946
Spain	Catholic Church	Catholic	1978
Sweden	Church of Sweden	Lutheran	2000
Switzerland	separate Cantonal Churches («Landeskirchen»)	Zwinglianism & Calvinism or Catholic	during the 20th century
United Province of Canada	Church of England	Anglican	1854
Uruguay	Catholic Church	Catholic	1918, (into effect in 1919)
Virginia	Church of England	Anglican	1786
Waldeck	Evangelical State Church of Waldeck and Pyrmont	United Protestant	1918
Wales (Note: The Church in Wales was split from the Church of England in 1920, by Welsh Church Act 1914; at the same time becoming disestablished.)	Church of England	Anglican	1920
West Florida	Church of England	Anglican	1783
Württemberg	Evangelical State Church in Württemberg	Lutheran	1918

== National church ==
A number of countries have a national church which is not established (as the official religion of the nation), but is nonetheless recognised under civil law as being the country's acknowledged religious denomination. Whilst these are not Christian states, the official Christian national church is likely to have certain residual state functions in relation to state occasions and ceremonial. Examples include Norway (Church of Norway), Scotland (Church of Scotland) and Sweden (Church of Sweden). A national church typically has a monopoly on official state recognition, although unusually Finland has two national churches (the Evangelical Lutheran Church of Finland and the Finnish Orthodox Church), both recognised under civil law as joint official churches of the nation.

== See also ==
- Constitutional references to God
- enthronement movement
- Antidisestablishmentarianism
- Christian nationalism
- Christian Reconstructionism
- Christian republic
- Civil religion
- Halachic state
- History of Christian flags
- Integralism
- Islamic state
- Pan-Christianity
- Render unto Caesar
- Res publica Christiana
- Separation of church and state
- Theonomy
