= History of Christian flags =

Field of vexillological history

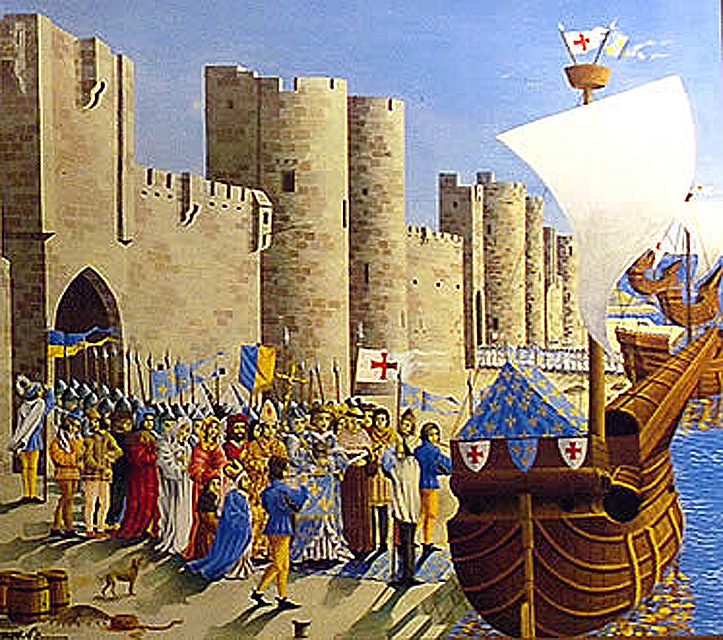
Christian soldiers carrying flags depart Aigues-Mortes for the Seventh Crusade

The history of Christian flags encompasses the establishment of Christian states, the Crusader era, and the 20th century ecumenical movement.

== National flags with Christian symbolism ==
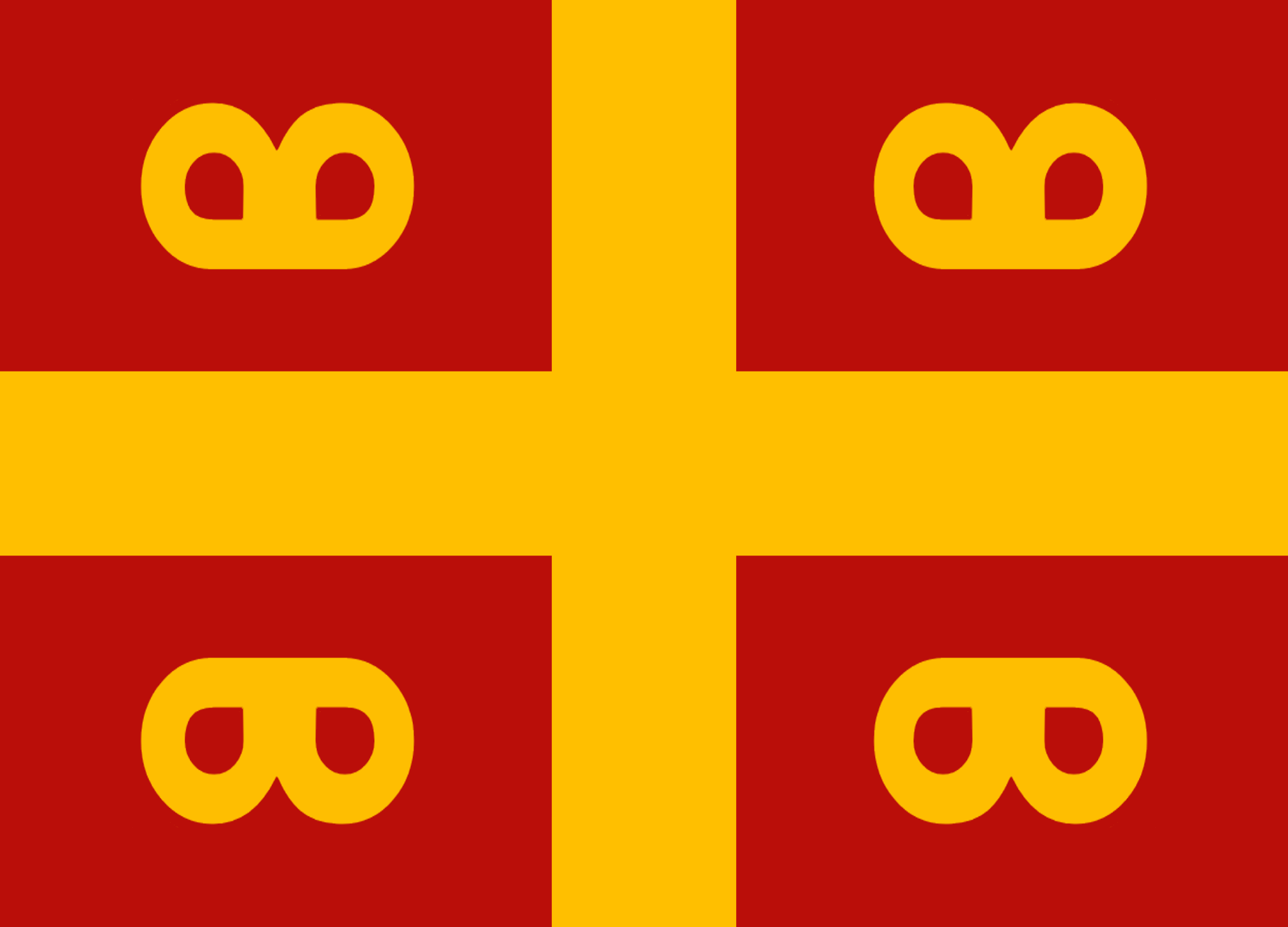
Byzantine flag as shown on some portolan charts

Christian empires, such as the Kingdom of Georgia, which became a Christian state in AD 337, adopted Christian symbolism in its flag. Likewise, the flags of the Byzantine Empire often depicted "a bowl with a cross, symbol[ic] of the Byzantine worldly domination for centuries and of the ecumenical mission to spread Christianity to all the world".

Many officially Christian states and predominantly Christian countries have flags with Christian symbolism. Many flags used by modern nations have their roots in historical Christian flags used in historic Christian empires, such as the Byzantine Empire, or in crusader vexillology.

Flag of Andorra

Flag of Australia

Flag of Cook Islands

Flag of Denmark

Flag of Dominica

Flag of the Dominican Republic

Flag of El Salvador

Flag of Fiji

Flag of Finland

Flag of Georgia

Flag of Greece

Flag of Iceland

Flag of Lebanon

Flag of Liechtenstein

Flag of Malta

Flag of Moldova

Flag of Montenegro

Flag of Montserrat

Flag of New Zealand

Flag of Niue

Flag of Norway

Flag of Portugal

Flag of San Marino

Flag of Serbia

Flag of Slovakia

Flag of Spain

Flag of Sweden

Flag of Switzerland

Flag of Tonga

Flag of Tuvalu

Flag of the United Kingdom

Flag of the Vatican City

== Crusader era ==
In the Middle Ages, Christian flags bore various types of Christian crosses. Military orders of Christian knights used these crosses in their flags. For example, the Knights Hospitaller (Knights of Malta) used and continue to use a Maltese cross in their flags.

Flag of the French crusaders and the Order of Saint George

Flag of the English crusaders

Flag of the Italian crusaders

Flag of the Flemish crusaders

Flag of the Breton crusaders

Flag of the Gascon crusaders

Flag of the German crusaders, then used as the war flag of the Holy Roman Empire

Flag of the Danish crusaders

Flag of the Hungarian crusaders, used by the army of György Dózsa

Flag of the Knights Hospitaller (Sovereign Military Order of Malta)

Variant flag of the Knights Hospitaller (Sovereign Military Order of Malta)

Flag of the Knights Templar

Flag of the Teutonic Order

Flag of the Order of Saint Lazarus

Flag of the Order of the Holy Sepulchre

Flag of the Kingdom of Jerusalem

Flag of Marseille also has its origins in the Crusader era

Flag of the Kingdom of Cyprus

Flag of the Galleys of the Order of Saint Stephen

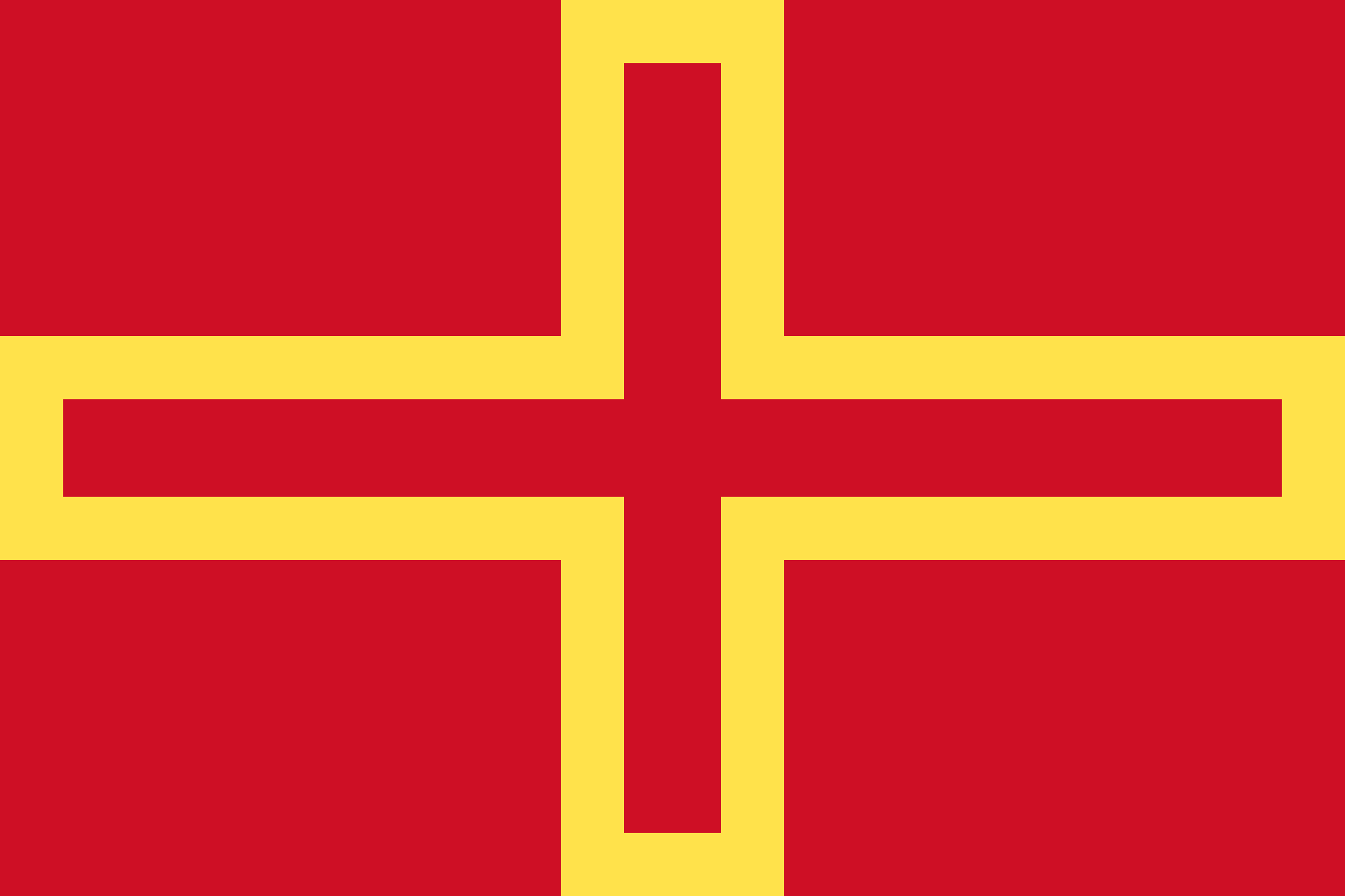
Flag of the County of Tripoli

== Flags of Christian denominations ==
Many Christian denominations have their own denominational flag and display it alongside the ecumenical Christian Flag or independent from it.

Catholic Churches in communion with the Holy See often display the Vatican flag along with their respective national flag, typically on opposite sides of the sanctuary, near the front door, or hoisted on flagstaffs outside. Individual dioceses may also fly flags based on the diocesan coat of arms.

Eastern Orthodox Churches, particularly jurisdictions of the Greek Orthodox tradition under the direct authority of the Ecumenical Patriarch, often display the patriarchal flag. It is a Byzantine double-headed eagle on a yellow (Or) field.

Parishes in the Episcopal Church frequently fly the Episcopal flag, a Cross of St. George with the upper-left canton containing a Cross of St. Andrew formed by nine crosslets (representing the nine original dioceses) on a blue background.

The Salvation Army has a flag with a blue border (symbolizing the purity of God the Father), a red field (symbolizing the blood of Jesus Christ), and a gold eight-pointed star (symbolizing the fire of the Holy Spirit). The star bears the Salvation army's motto, "Blood and Fire".

The Anglican Communion has a blue flag with a St George's Cross in the centre surrounded with a gold band with the wording, "The Truth shall make you free." in New Testament Greek on it. From the band sprout the points of a compass (symbolising the spread worldwide of Anglicanism). On the "North" of the compass is a mitre (a symbol of apostolic order essential to all Churches and Provinces constituting the Anglican Communion).

The Church of England uses the St George's Cross flag with the coat of arms of the individual diocese in the upper-left canton.

The Church of Scotland uses a Flag of Scotland depicting the Burning Bush (or Unburnt Bush, in some traditions).

The Church in Wales uses a blue Cross defaced with a gold Celtic Cross.

The Church of Ireland uses the St Patrick's Saltire but also uses the Compass-rose Flag of the Anglican Communion equally.

The Protestant Church in Germany, a federation of Lutheran, Reformed and United Protestant churches, has a flag with a violet Latin cross.

Additionally, many Catholic, Protestant and Orthodox churches maintain the use of the Labarum, a historical symbol of Christianity, which is rarely used as a flag at present.

Flag of the Catholic Church, also the flag of Vatican City and the Holy See

Flag of the Greek Orthodox Church

Flag of the Georgian Orthodox Church

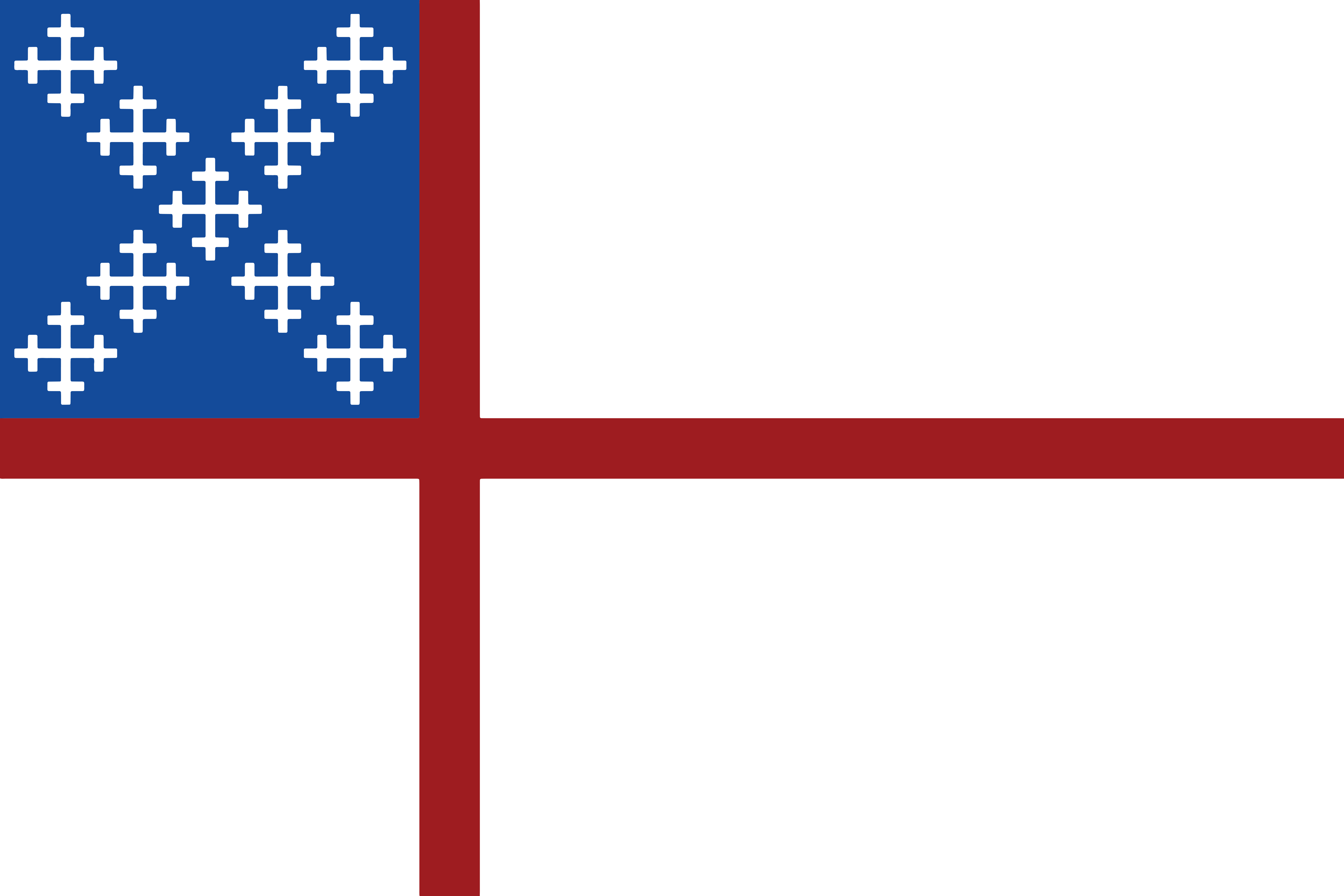
Flag of the Episcopal Church

Flag of the Serbian Orthodox Church

Flag of the Armenian Apostolic Church

Standard of The Salvation Army

Flag of the Anglican Communion

Flag of the Church in Wales

Flag of the Church of Scotland

Flag of the Church of Ireland

Flag of Anglican Church of Australia

Flag of the Anglican Church of Canada

Flag of the Protestant Church in Germany

Flag of the Protestant Church in Germany (alternative version)

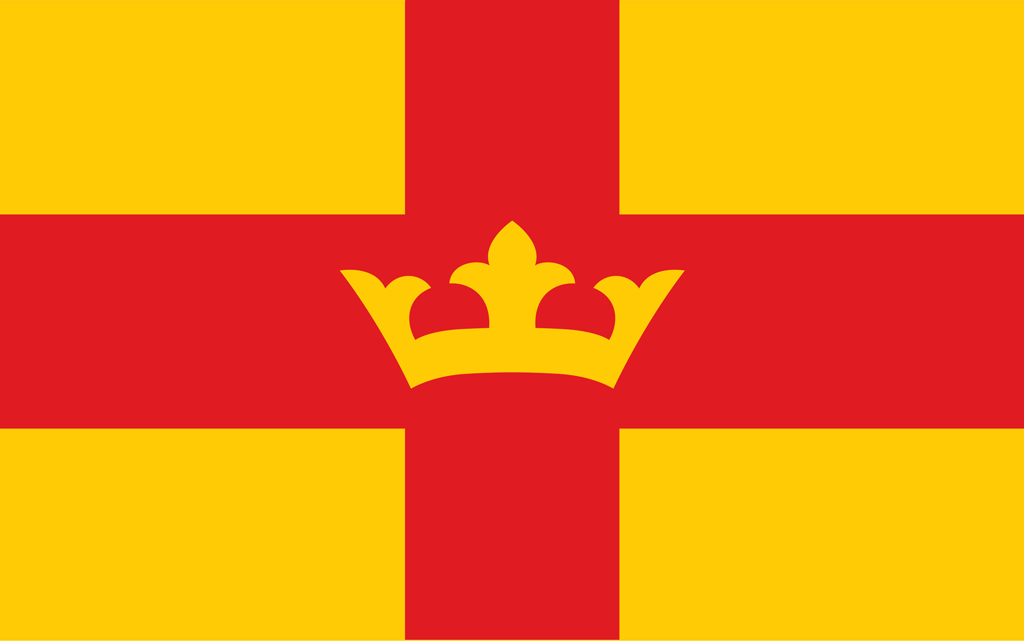
Flag of the Church of Sweden

Flag of the Hussites

== Christian Flag adopted by the Federal Council of Churches ==
The Christian Flag

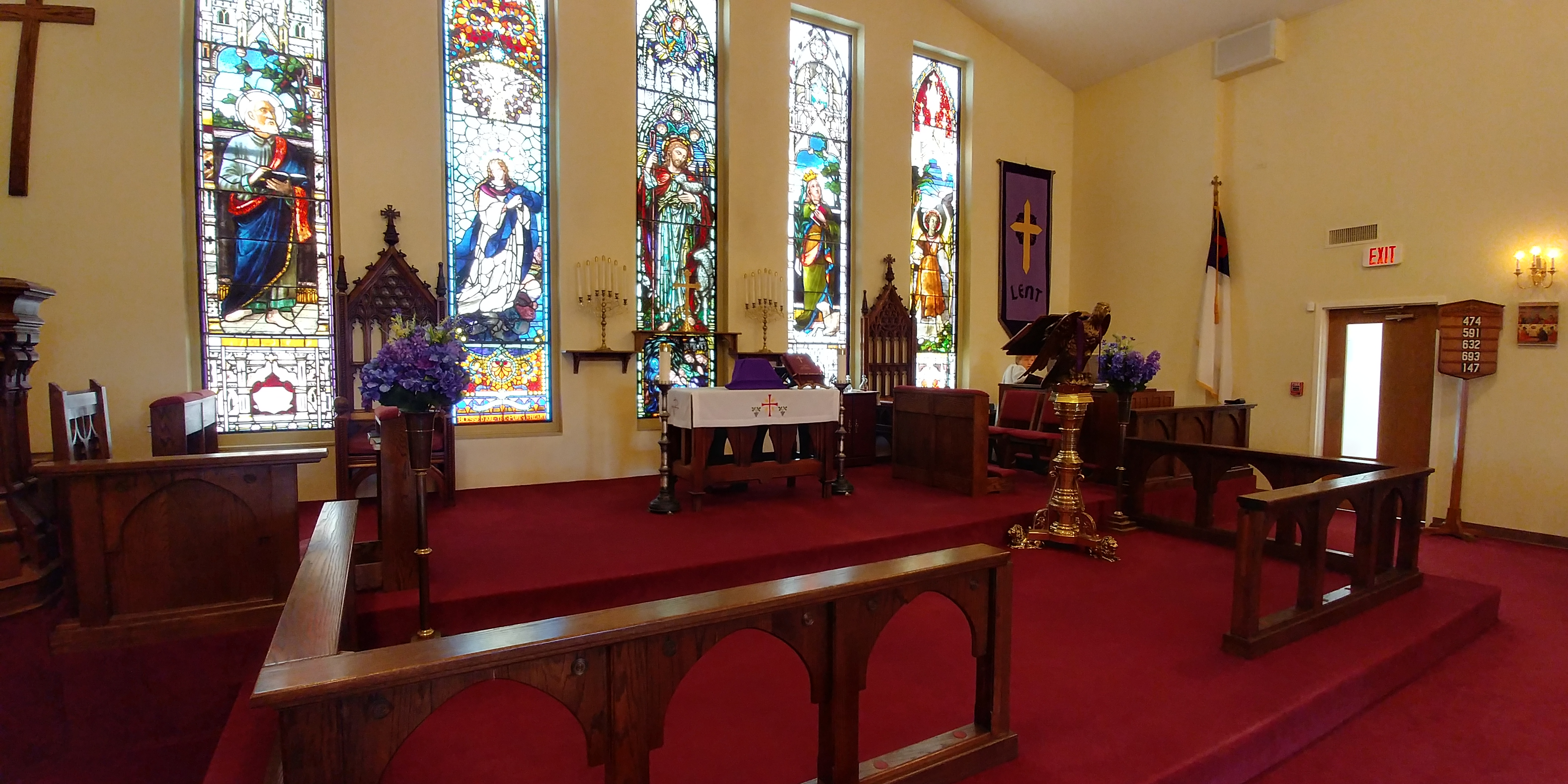
The Christian Flag being displayed in the chancel of an Anglican sanctuary in Tinley Park, Illinois.

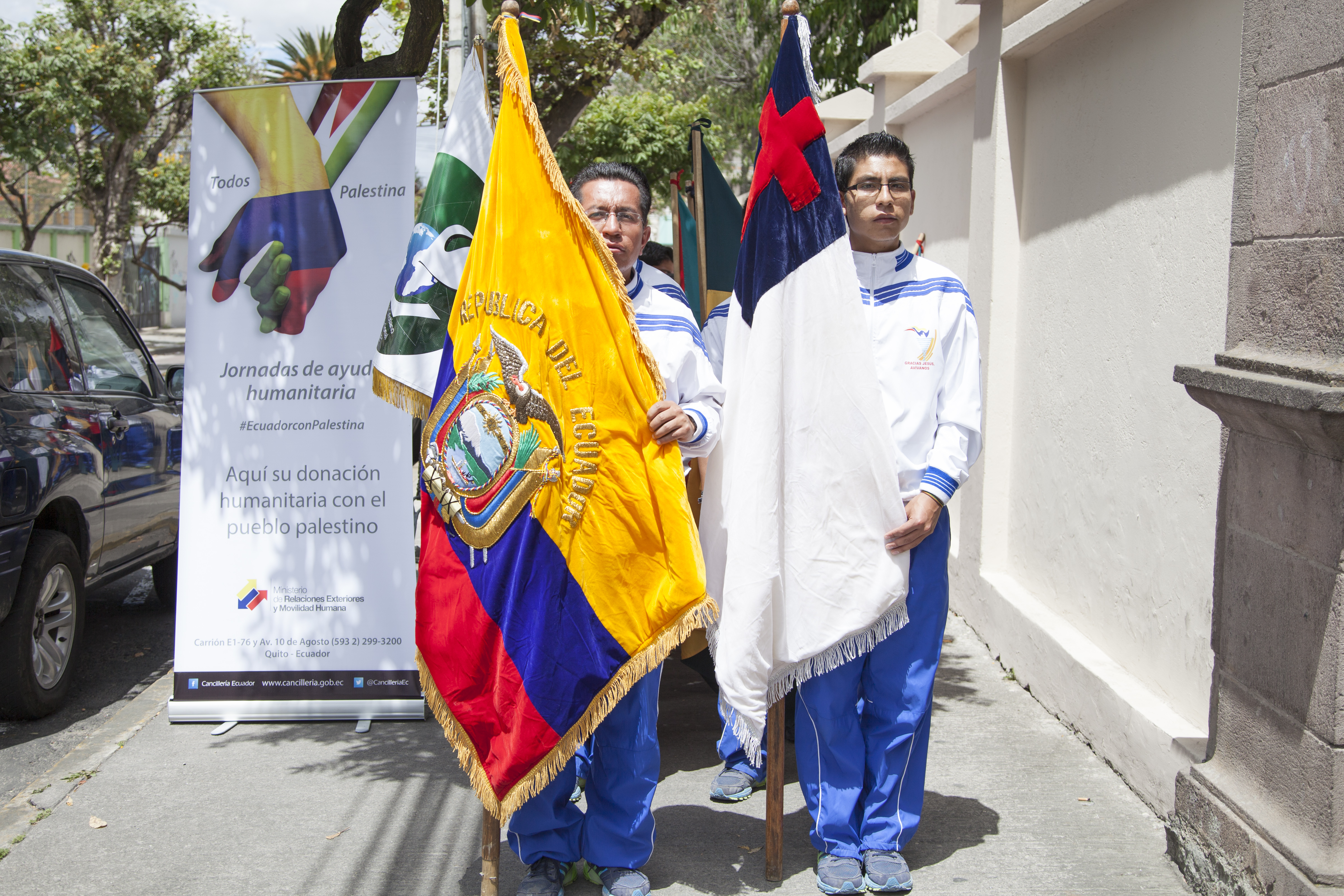
The Christian Flag and Ecuadorian Flag being carried in a parade.

In the beginnings of ecumenical movement in the late 19th and early 20th centuries, the Christian Flag was first conceived on 26 September 1897, at Brighton Chapel on Coney Island in Brooklyn, New York in the United States. The superintendent of a Sunday school, Charles C. Overton, gave a lecture to the gathered students and asked the students what an ecumenical flag representing all of Christianity would look like. In 1907, Overton and Ralph Diffendorfer, secretary of the Methodist Young People's Missionary Movement, designed and began promoting the flag. The Christian Flag intentionally has no patent, as the designer dedicated the flag to all of Christendom. With regard to the Christian symbolism of the Christian Flag:

The ground is white, representing peace, purity and innocence. In the upper corner is a blue square, the color of the unclouded sky, emblematic of heaven, the home of the Christian; also a symbol of faith and trust. in the center of the blue is the cross, the ensign and chosen symbol of Christianity: the cross is red, typical of Christ's blood.

The ecumenical organization, Federal Council of Churches, now succeeded by the National Council of Churches and Christian Churches Together, adopted the flag on 23 January 1942. Since then, the Christian Flag is used by many congregations of various Christian traditions, including the Anglican, Baptist, Congregationalist, Lutheran, Mennonite, Methodist, Moravian, Presbyterian, Quaker, and Reformed, among others.

The famous hymn writer, Fanny J. Crosby, devoted a hymn titled “The Christian Flag”, with music by R. Huntington Woodman, in its honour; like the flag, the hymn is also free use. On the Sunday nearest 26 September 1997, the Christian Flag celebrated its one hundredth anniversary.

== See also ==
- Flag families
- Labarum
- Islamic flags
- List of national flags by design
