= Ralph Eugene Diffendorfer =

American clergyman

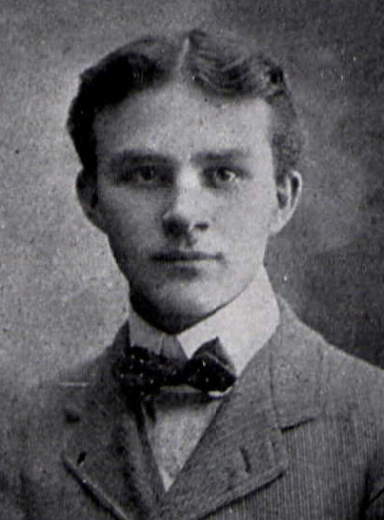
- Diffendorfer, from the 1901 yearbook of Ohio Wesleyan University
- Born: August 15, 1879; Hayesville, Ohio, U.S.
- Died: January 31, 1951 (aged 71); Madison, New Jersey, U.S.
- Occupations: Clergyman, lecturer

Ralph Eugene Diffendorfer (August 15, 1879 – January 31, 1951) was an American clergyman in the Methodist Episcopal Church. He held national leadership roles in the denomination's mission and education programs, and was one of the designers of the Christian flag. He was described as "one of the foremost missionary leaders of world-Protestantism."

== Early life and education ==
Diffendorfer was born on August 15, 1879, in Hayesville, Ohio, to Franklin Diffendorfer and Addie Leora Arnold. He was educated at Ohio Wesleyan University, Drew Theological Seminary, and Union Theological Seminary.

== Career ==
Diffendorfer was assistant secretary of the Epworth League from 1902 to 1904, and from 1904 to 1916 was secretary of the Missionary Education Movement of the United States and Canada. The following year (1916–1917), he was educational secretary of the Board of Home Missions and Church Extension and the Board of Foreign Missions of the Methodist Episcopal Church. He was associate secretary of the Centenary Commission of the Board of Home Missions and Church Extension in 1918, and in 1919–1920 served as director of the Home Missions Survey of the Inter-church world movement.

In 1920 Diffendorfer was appointed secretary of the department of education of the Committee on Conservation and Advance of the Methodist Episcopal Church in Chicago. He attended international conferences in Hyderabad, Zurich, Jerusalem in 1928, Oxford in 1937, in Madras in 1938, and in the Netherlands in 1948. Before and after World War II, he traveled to Japan, and was president of the Japan International Christian University Foundation. He was founder and president of the Associated Boards of Christian Colleges in China, served on the boards of schools and seminaries in China, Argentina, and Chile.

In 1907, he helped Charles C. Overton design and promote the Christian flag.

Christian flag

== Publications ==
- Child Life in Mission Lands (1904)
- Junior Studies in the Life of Christ (1904, with Charles Herbert Morgan)
- A Modern Disciple of Jesus Christ—David Livingstone (1913)
- Thy Kingdom Come (1914)
- Missionary Education in Home and School (1917)
- The Church and the Community (1920)
- The World Service of the Methodist Episcopal Church (1923)
- A Voyage of Discovery (1934)
- China and Japan? (1938)

== Personal life ==
Diffendorfer married Edna Saylor in 1903. He died from a heart attack on January 31, 1951, at age 71, in Madison, New Jersey.
