= Christian Flag =

Ecumenical flag

- Use: Banner
- Adopted: January 23, 1942 (Federal Council of Churches)
- Design: A blue canton containing a red Latin cross upon a white field.
- Designed by: Charles C. Overton; Ralph E. Diffendorfer

The Christian Flag is an ecumenical flag designed in the late 19th century to represent Christianity and Christendom. Since its adoption by the United States Federal Council of Churches in 1942, it has had varied usage by congregations of many Christian traditions, including Anglican, Baptist, Congregationalist, Lutheran, Mennonite, Methodist, Moravian, Presbyterian, and Reformed, among others.

The flag has a white field, with a red Latin cross inside a blue canton. The shade of red on the cross symbolizes the blood that Jesus shed on Calvary. The blue represents the waters of baptism as well as the faithfulness of Jesus. The white represents Jesus' purity. The dimensions of the flag and canton have no official specifications.

== Origins ==
The Christian Flag was first conceived on September 26, 1897, at Brighton Chapel on Coney Island in Brooklyn, New York in the United States. The superintendent of a Sunday school, Charles C. Overton, gave an impromptu lecture to the gathered students, because the scheduled speaker had failed to arrive for the event. He gave a speech asking the students what a flag representing Christianity would look like. Overton thought about his improvised speech for many years afterward.

In 1907, Overton and Ralph Diffendorfer, secretary of the Methodist Young People's Missionary Movement, designed and began promoting the flag. With regard to the Christian symbolism of the Christian Flag:

The ground is white, representing purity. In the upper corner is a blue square, the color of the waters of baptism, emblematic of heaven, the home of the Christian; also a symbol of faith and trust. in the center of the blue is the cross, the ensign and chosen symbol of Christianity: the cross is red, typical of Christ's blood.

The ecumenical organization, Federal Council of Churches (now succeeded by the National Council of Churches) adopted the flag on 23 January 1942, 45 years after unofficial use since 1897; the Federal Council of Churches represented Baptist, Brethren, Eastern Orthodox, Episcopal, Methodist, Moravian, Lutheran, Oriental Orthodox, Polish National Catholic, Presbyterian, Quaker, and Reformed traditions, among others. The Christian Flag intentionally has had no copyright or trademark rights connected to it, as the designer freely dedicated the flag to all of Christendom. Fanny Crosby wrote the words to a hymn called "The Christian Flag" with music by R. Huntington Woodman. Like the flag, the hymn is free use. On the Sunday nearest September 26, 1997, the Christian Flag celebrated its one hundredth anniversary.

== Usage ==
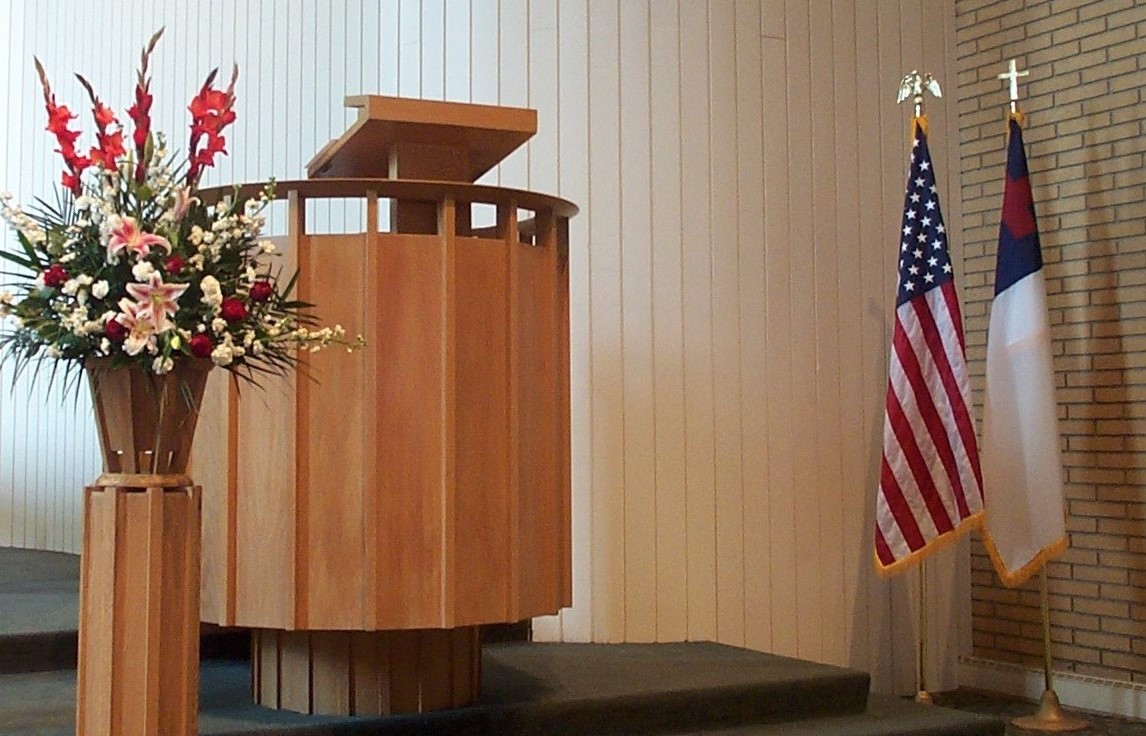
The U.S. and Christian flags with eagle and cross finials, respectively.

Mainline Protestant denominations in the United States accepted the flag first, and by the 1980s many institutions had described policies for displaying it inside churches. The Federal Council of Churches recommended that if the Christian Flag is to be used alongside a national flag, that the Christian Flag should receive the place of honor. During World War II the flag was flown along with the US flag in a number of Lutheran churches, many of them with German backgrounds, who wanted to show solidarity with the United States during the war against Nazi Germany.

The Christian Flag spread outside North America with Christian missionaries. It can be seen today in or outside many Christian churches throughout the world, particularly in Latin America and in Africa. By the 1930s the flag had been adopted by some Protestant churches in Europe, Asia, and Africa as well.

The Christian Flag is not copyrighted and therefore, "Anyone may manufacture it, and it may be used on all proper occasions."

In Canada and the United States, accommodationists and separationists have entered impassioned debate on the legality of erecting the Christian Flag atop governmental buildings.

== Pledge ==
Some churches and organizations in the USA practice a "pledge of allegiance" or "affirmation of loyalty" to the Christian Flag, which is similar to the Pledge of Allegiance to the U.S. flag. The first pledge was written by Lynn Harold Hough, a Methodist minister who had heard Ralph E. Diffendorfer, secretary to the Methodist Young People's Missionary Movement, promoting the Christian flag at a rally. He wrote the following pledge:

I pledge allegiance to the Christian flag, and to the Saviour for whose kingdom it stands; one brotherhood, uniting all mankind in service and in love.

Some more conservative evangelical, Lutheran, Adventist, and Baptist churches and schools may use an alternative version of the pledge:

I pledge allegiance to the Christian flag, and to the Saviour for whose Kingdom it stands; one Saviour, crucified, risen, and coming again with life and liberty to all who believe.

An alternate version that some Lutheran schools use is this:

I pledge allegiance to the Cross of our Lord Jesus Christ and to the Faith, for which it stands. One Savior, King Eternal, with mercy and grace for all.

Others use this version:

I pledge allegiance to the Christian Flag, and to the Savior for whose Kingdom it stands; one brotherhood, uniting all [true] Christians, in service, and in love.

Some others may use this version:

I pledge allegiance to the Christian Flag, and to the Savior for whose Kingdom it stands. the only Savior. crucified, risen, and coming again, with life and salvation for all who believe.

For the Christian Flag Pledge, it is customary to stand with the right hand over the heart.

== Anthem ==
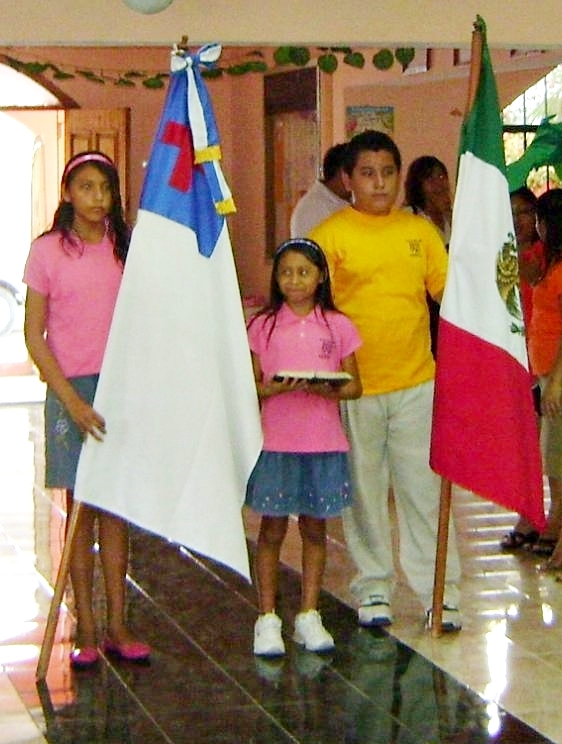
Mexican children carrying the flag alongside the Mexican flag in 2009.

The anthem of the Christian Flag was written in 1903 by Fanny Crosby:

The Christian Flag! behold it,
And hail it with a song,
And let the voice of millions
The joyful strain prolong,
To every clime and nation,
We send it forth today;
God speed its glorious mission,
With earnest hearts we pray.

Refrain
The Christian Flag! behold it,
And hail it with a song,
And let the voice of millions
The joyful strain prolong,

The Christian Flag! unfurl it,
That all the world may see
The bloodstained cross of Jesus,
Who died to make us free.
The Christian Flag! unfurl it,
And o’er and o’er again,
Oh! may it bear the message,
"Good will and peace to men."

The Christian Flag! God bless it!
Now throw it to the breeze,
And may it wave triumphant
O’er land and distant seas,
Till all the wide creation
Upon its folds shall gaze,
And all the world united,
Our loving Saviour praise.
