= Lateran Museum =

Defunct museum in Rome

- Dissolved: 1970
- Coordinates: 41°53′11.8″N 12°30′20.7″E

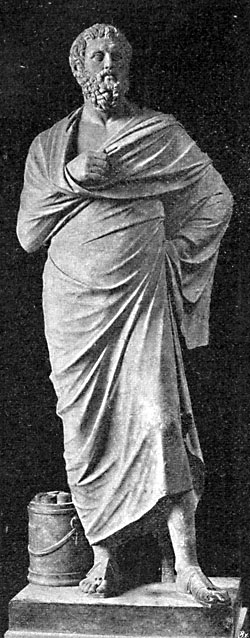
The statue of Sophocles in the Lateran Museum as pictured in 1905

The Lateran Museum (Museo Lateranense) was a museum founded by the Popes and housed in the Lateran Palace, adjacent to the Archbasilica of Saint John Lateran in Rome, Italy. It ceased to exist in 1970.

Pope Gregory XVI (1831–1846) established the Museo Profano Lateranense (or Museo Gregoriano Profano) in 1844. Its collections initially consisted of statues, bas-relief sculptures and mosaics of the Roman era. The museum was enlarged in 1854 under Pius IX (1846–1878) with the addition of the Museo Pio Cristiano. This collection was assembled by the archaeologists Father Giuseppe Marchi and Giovanni Battista de Rossi. Marchi collected the sculptured monuments of the early Christian period, while de Rossi the ancient Christian inscriptions. A third department of the museum consisted of copies of some of the more important catacomb frescoes. Father Marchi was appointed the director of the new institution. In 1910, under the pontificate of Pius X (1903–1914), the Hebrew Lapidary (Lapidario Ebraico) was established. This section contained 137 inscriptions from ancient Hebrew cemeteries in Rome mostly from via Portuense. The Museo Missionario Etnografico was founded by Pius XI with the documents and relics exhibited in Rome at the Missionary Exposition in 1925, and included historical documents of Missions and relics from the people where these missions took place. The three collections were transferred, under the pontificate of Pope John XXIII (1958–1963), from the Lateran Palace to the Vatican. They were reopened to the public in 1970. Their collections are still called "ex Lateranense" to indicate their former place of display.

The Lateran Palace is now occupied by the Museo Storico Vaticano which illustrates the history of the Papal States. It was moved to the palace in 1987 and inaugurated in 1991.

== Sources ==
- Herbermann, Charles, ed. (1913). "Christian Museum of Lateran". Catholic Encyclopedia. New York: Robert Appleton Company.
