= Properties of the Holy See =

List of real estate regulated by Lateran Treaty

Properties of the Holy See with extraterritorial rights in Rome
UNESCO World Heritage Site
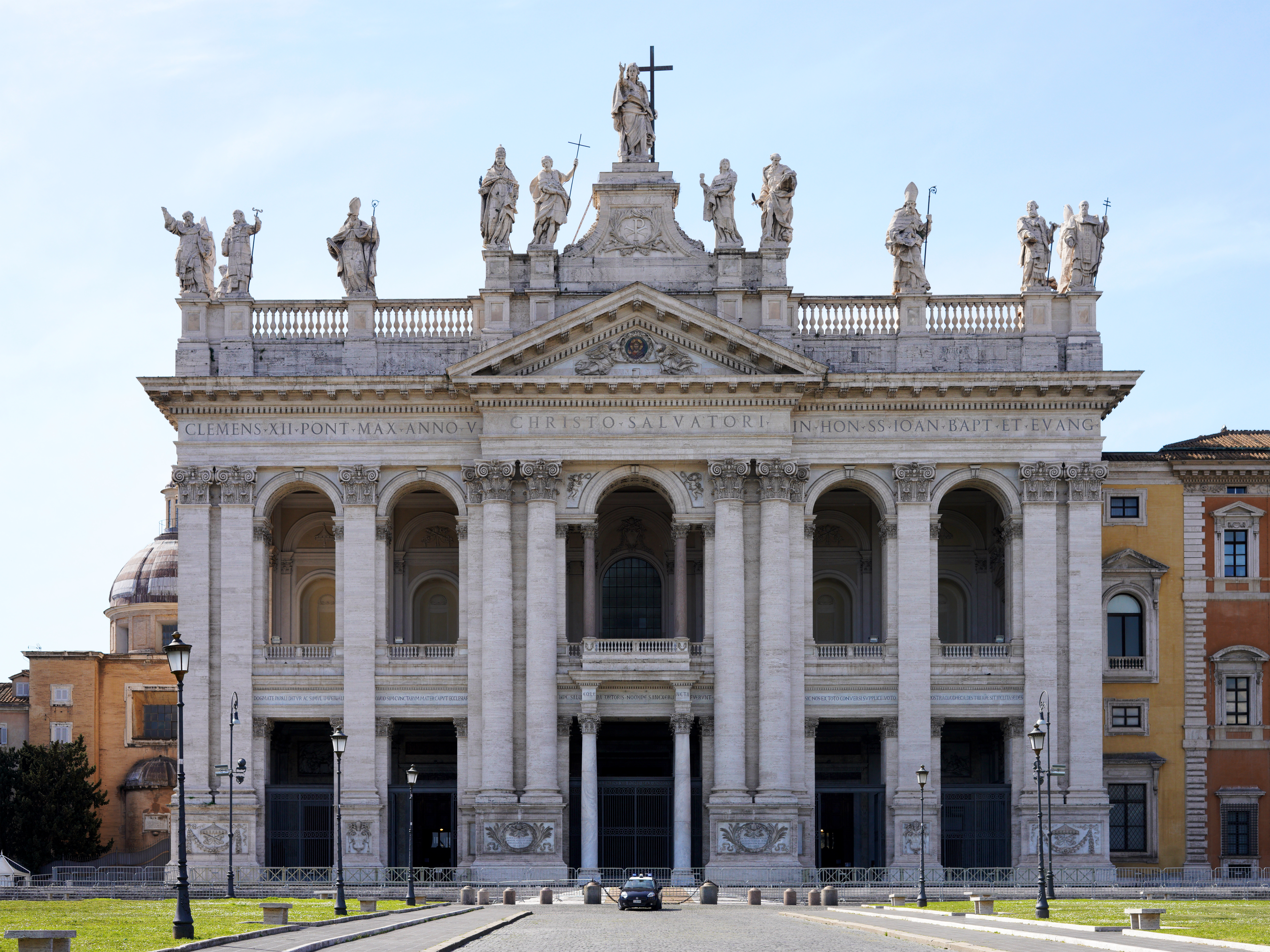
- Saint John Lateran; highest ranking basilica, seat of the Bishop of Rome; extraterritorial property outside Vatican City territory.

- Location within Rome Location within Lazio Location within Italy
- Location: Rome, Italy
- Part of: Historic Centre of Rome, the Properties of the Holy See in that City Enjoying Extraterritorial Rights and San Paolo Fuori le Mura
- Includes: Complexes of St John in Lateran and of Scala Sancta; Complex of Santa Maria Maggiore; Palazzo di San Callisto and buildings along the Via S. Egidio in Trastevere; Palazzo della Cancelleria; Palazzo di Propaganda Fide; Palazzo Maffei; Palazzo dei Convertendi; Palazzi detti dei Propilei; Palazzo San Pio X; Properties on the Gianicolo; Palazzo del Santo Uffizio; Basilica di San Paolo fuori le mura
- Criteria: Cultural: (i)(ii)(iii)(iv)(vi)
- Reference: 91ter
- Inscription: 1980 (4th Session)
- Extensions: 1990, 2015
- Area: 38.9 ha (0.150 sq mi)
- Coordinates: 41°53′24.8″N 12°29′32.3″E

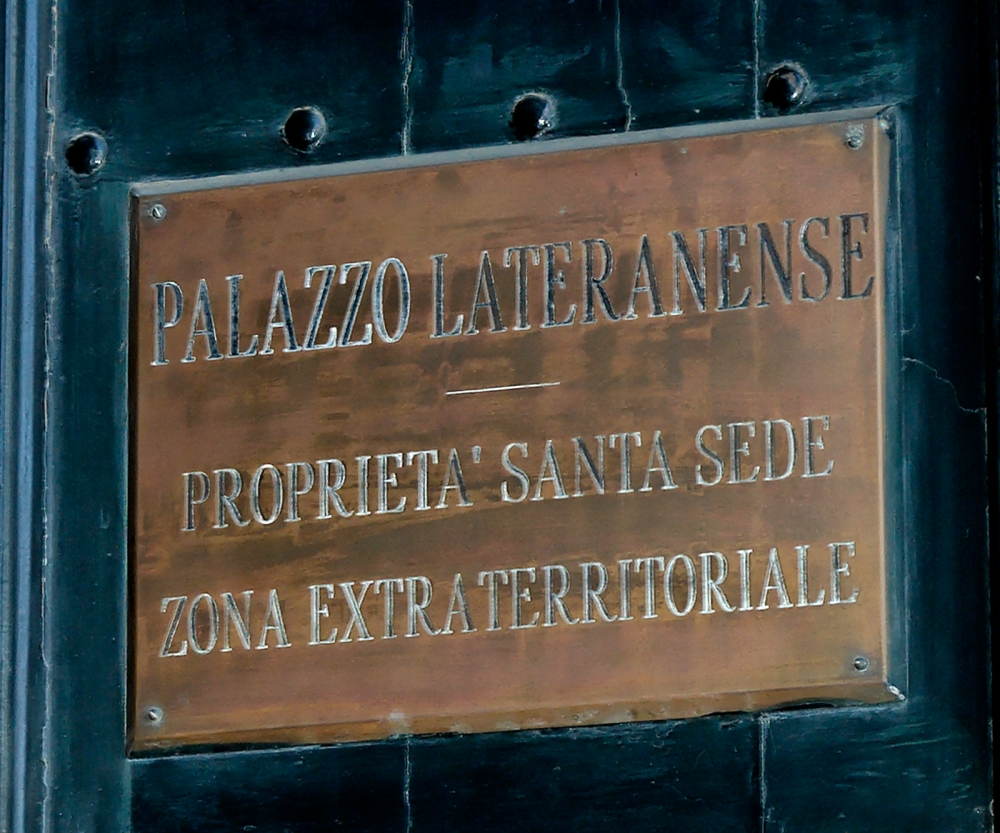
Plaque claiming extraterritoriality on the door of the Lateran Palace, Rome.

The properties of the Holy See are regulated by the 1929 Lateran Treaty signed with the Kingdom of Italy. Although part of Italian territory, some of them enjoy extraterritoriality similar to those of foreign embassies, including tax exemptions. Nonetheless, those visiting these properties are generally required to follow the immigration rules of Italy. For example, American seminarians at the Pontifical North American College need an Italian visa, despite residing, and studying, in extraterritorial property of the Holy See.

== Outside Vatican City but inside Rome ==
=== Extraterritorial property ===
- Archbasilica of Saint John Lateran (Arcibasilica di San Giovanni in Laterano)
- Basilica of Saint Mary Major (Basilica di Santa Maria Maggiore)
- Basilica of Saint Paul Outside the Walls (Basilica di San Paolo fuori le Mura) (the complex includes also the Benedictine monastery, the Pontifical Oratory of San Paolo and the Pontifical Beda College)
- Lateran Palace, Lateran University, the Scala Sancta and adjoining buildings
- Palace of the Holy Office (home of the Dicastery for the Doctrine of the Faith) in the Piazza del Sant'Uffizio and adjacent to the Basilica of St. Peter
- Palazzo di Propaganda Fide (home of the former Congregation for the Evangelization of Peoples) in the Piazza di Spagna
- Palazzo dei Convertendi (home of the Dicastery for the Eastern Churches), formerly in Piazza Scossacavalli, now in Via della Conciliazione
- Paul VI Audience Hall (partially; the rostrum with the papal throne however, is part of Vatican territory)
- Campo Santo Teutonico
- General Curia of the Order of Saint Augustine (including the Collegio Sta. Monica and the Pontifical Augustinian Patristic Institute)
- Gianicolo Hill area properties, namely the Pontifical Urban University, the Pontifical North American College, the Ukrainian Pontifical College of Saint Josaphat, the Romanian Pontifical College and the Bambino Gesù Hospital
- Jesuit Curia Complex
- Palazzo San Callisto (Palace of St Callixtus) – home of the former Pontifical Council Cor Unum
- Palazzo Maffei Marescotti (the Palace of the Vicariate) in Via della Pigna off the Corso Vittorio Emanuele II near the Piazza del Gesù
- Palazzo della Cancelleria between the Corso Vittorio Emanuele II and Campo de' Fiori
- Palazzo Pio in Via della Conciliazione (in exchange for Palazzo della Dataria)
- Pontifical Minor Roman Seminary

=== Non-extraterritorial property ===
- Palace of the Holy Apostles attached to the Basilica dei Santi XII Apostoli
- Palace attached to the Church of San Carlo ai Catinari
- Collegio Bellarmino in Via del Seminario near the Church of Sant'Ignazio.
- Archaeological Institute, Pontifical Oriental Institute, Pontifical Lombard Seminary and the Russian College on Piazza Santa Maria Maggiore.
- The two Palaces of Sant'Apollinare between the Piazza Sant'Apollinare and Via della Serola.
- The House of Retreat for the Clergy of Saints John and Paul, including the Nympheum of Nero, on the Caelian Hill.

=== Former extraterritorial property ===
- Palazzo della Datarìa, near the Quirinal Palace (not a property of the Holy See anymore; exchanged for Palazzo Pio in the aftermath of Italian seizure of Quirinial Palace)

== Outside Rome ==
Extraterritorial property of the Holy See in Castel Gandolfo: 1. Papal palace with adjacent garden; 2. Garden of the Villa Cybo; 3. Villa Barberini, gardens and agricultural area; 4. Oliveto ex-Bacelli; 5. Church of San Tommaso di Villanova

=== Extraterritorial property ===
- Palace of Castel Gandolfo, the Gardens of the Villa Cybo, Villa Barberini plus adjacent gardens, the summer estate of the Pontificio Collegio Urbano di Propaganda Fide and the papal farm between the towns of Castel Gandolfo and Albano Laziale (around 55 hectares or 140 acres).
- Area of Santa Maria di Galeria, where the antennae of Vatican Radio are located. The area was ceded by Italy to the Holy See in an agreement in 1951.

=== Non-extraterritorial property ===
- The Basilica of the Holy House (Santa Casa) at Loreto, Province of Ancona.
- The Basilica of St Francis at Assisi, Province of Perugia.
- The Basilica of St Anthony at Padua, Province of Padua.
- The Vatican Advanced Technology Telescope, Graham County, Arizona, US.

The Fundamental Accord, signed in 1993, grants property rights and tax exemptions to the Holy See over various Christian holy sites in Israel, but the agreement was never finalized because of diplomatic problems between the Vatican and Israeli governments.

== Gallery ==
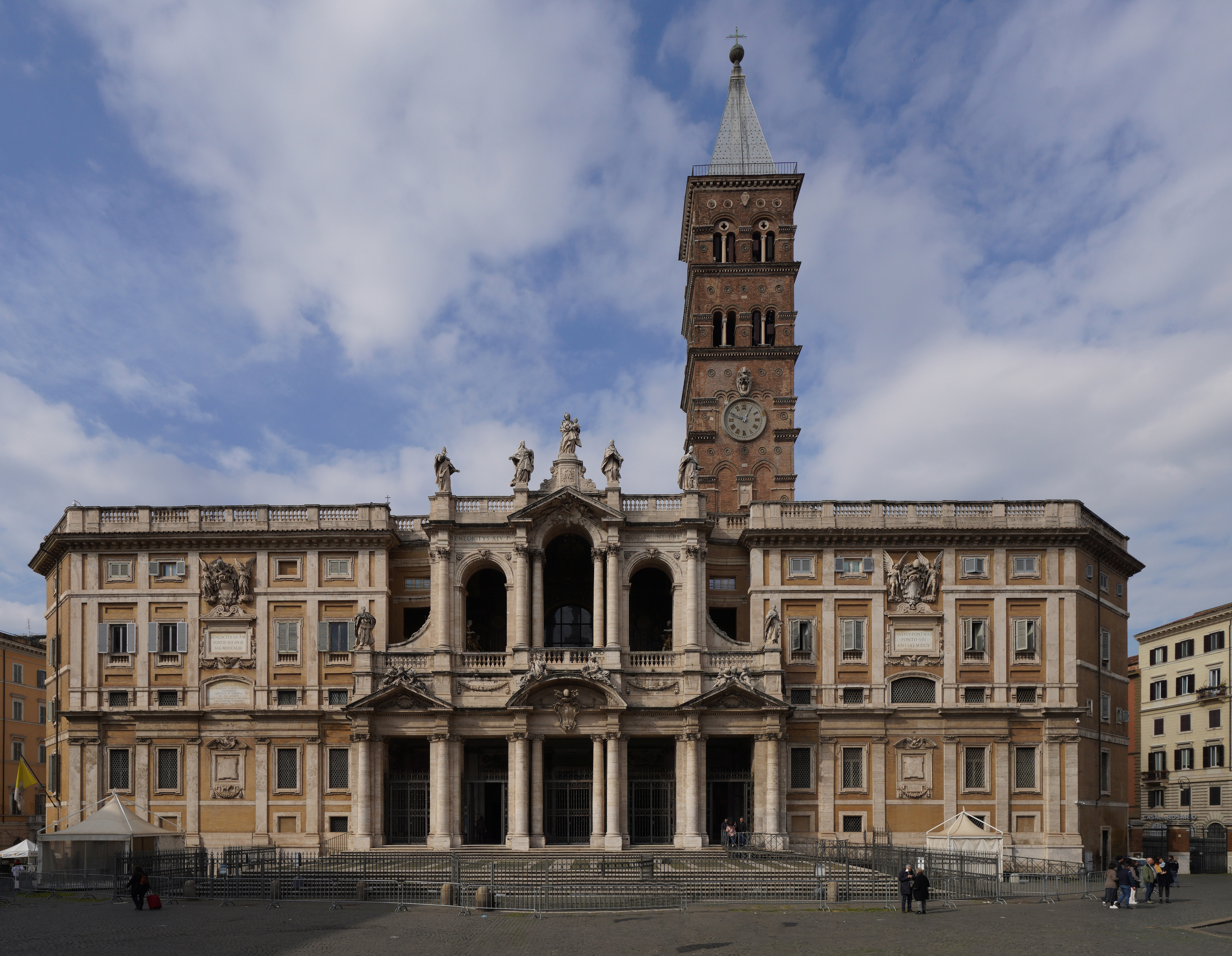
Basilica of Saint Mary Major, Rome

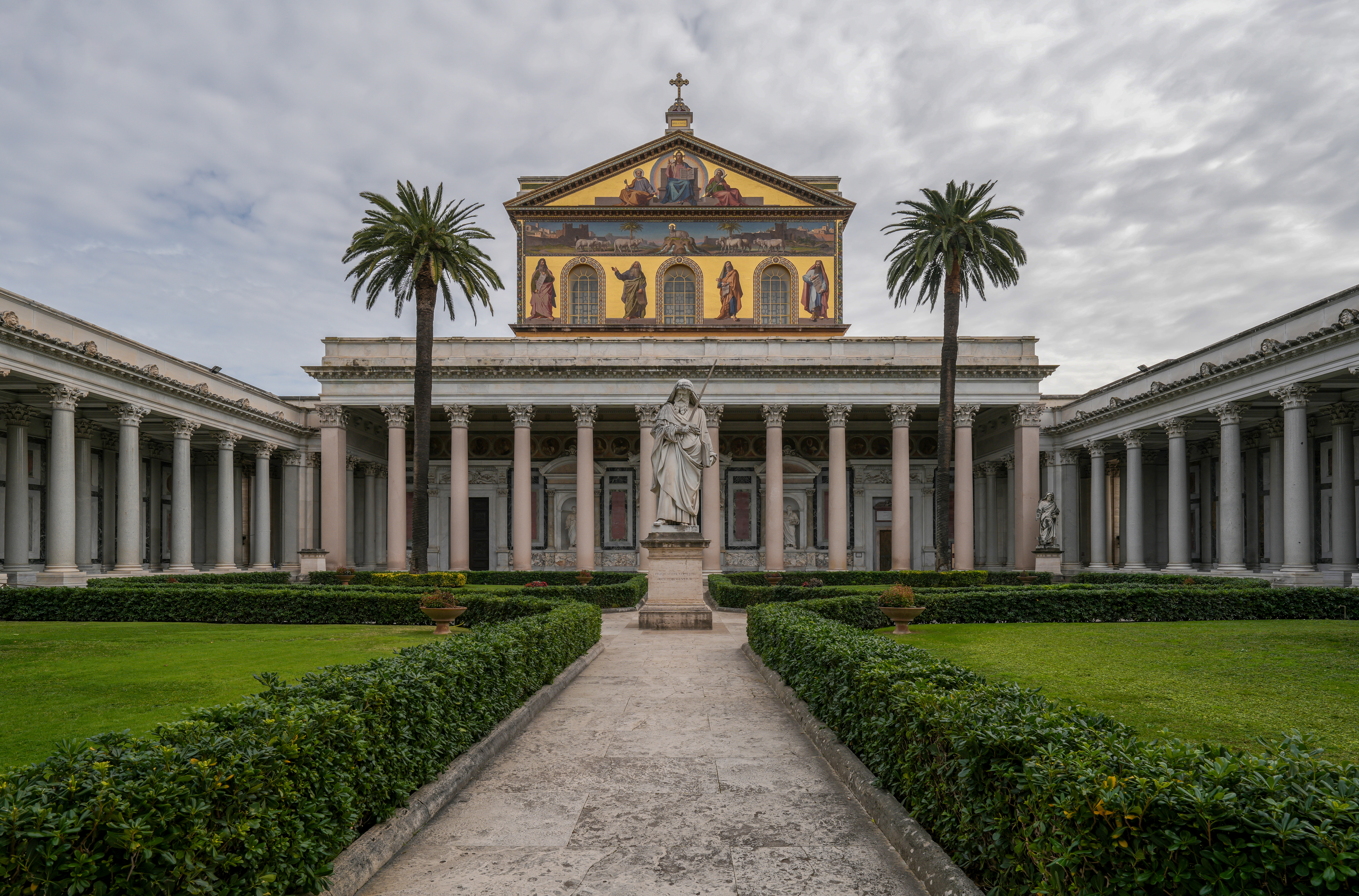
Basilica of Saint Paul Outside the Walls, Rome

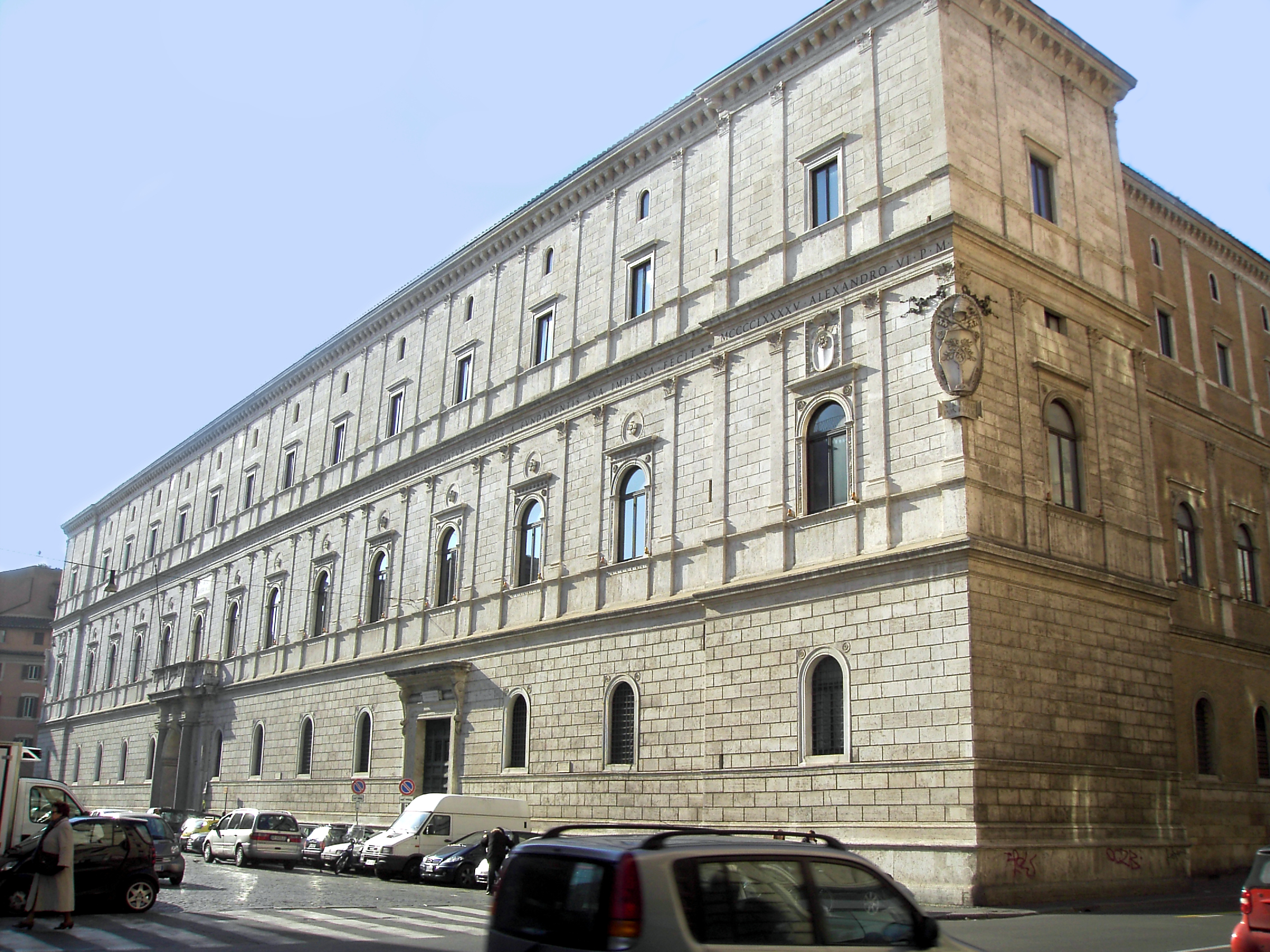
Palazzo della Cancelleria, Rome

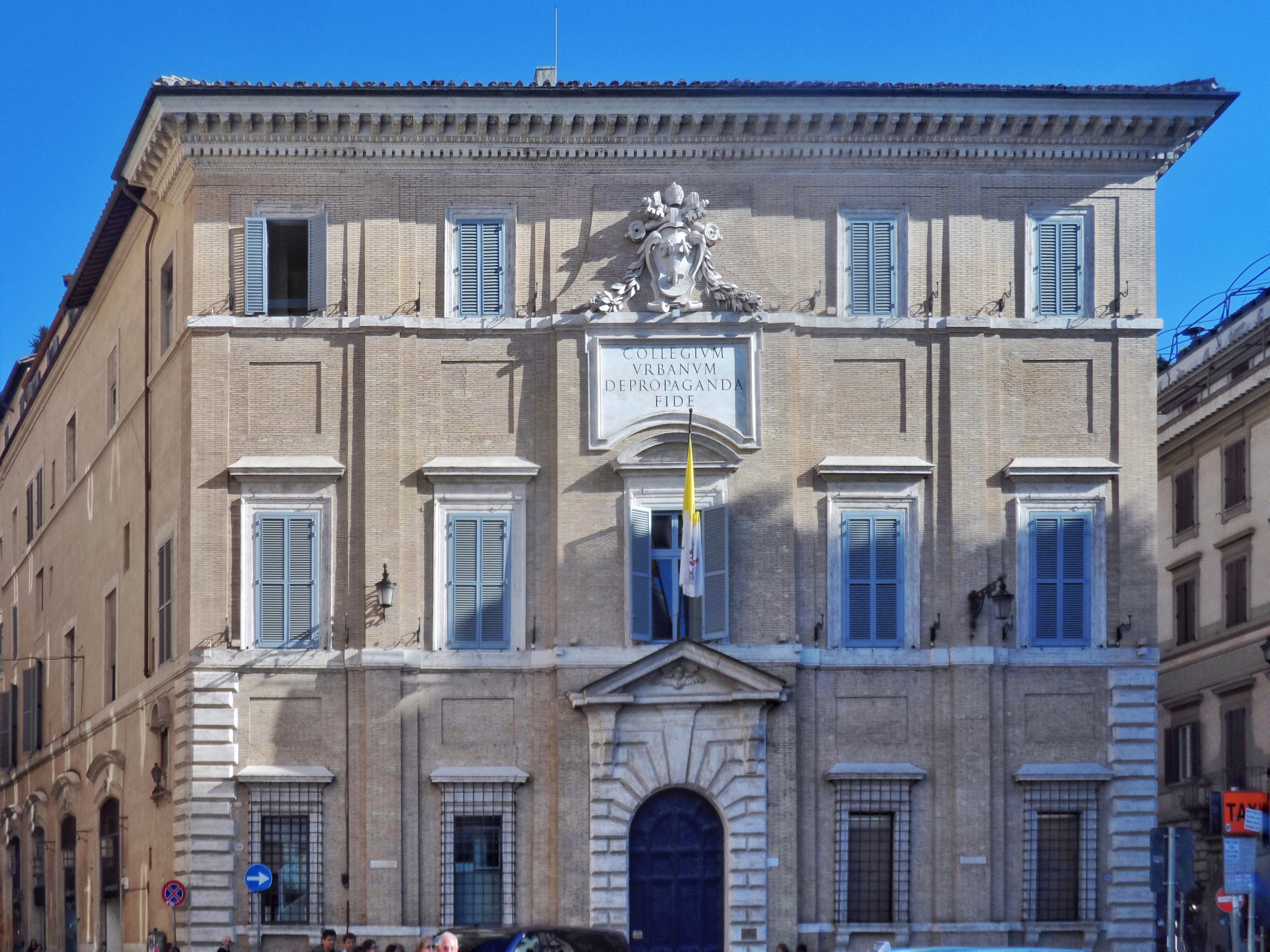
Palazzo di Propaganda Fide, Rome

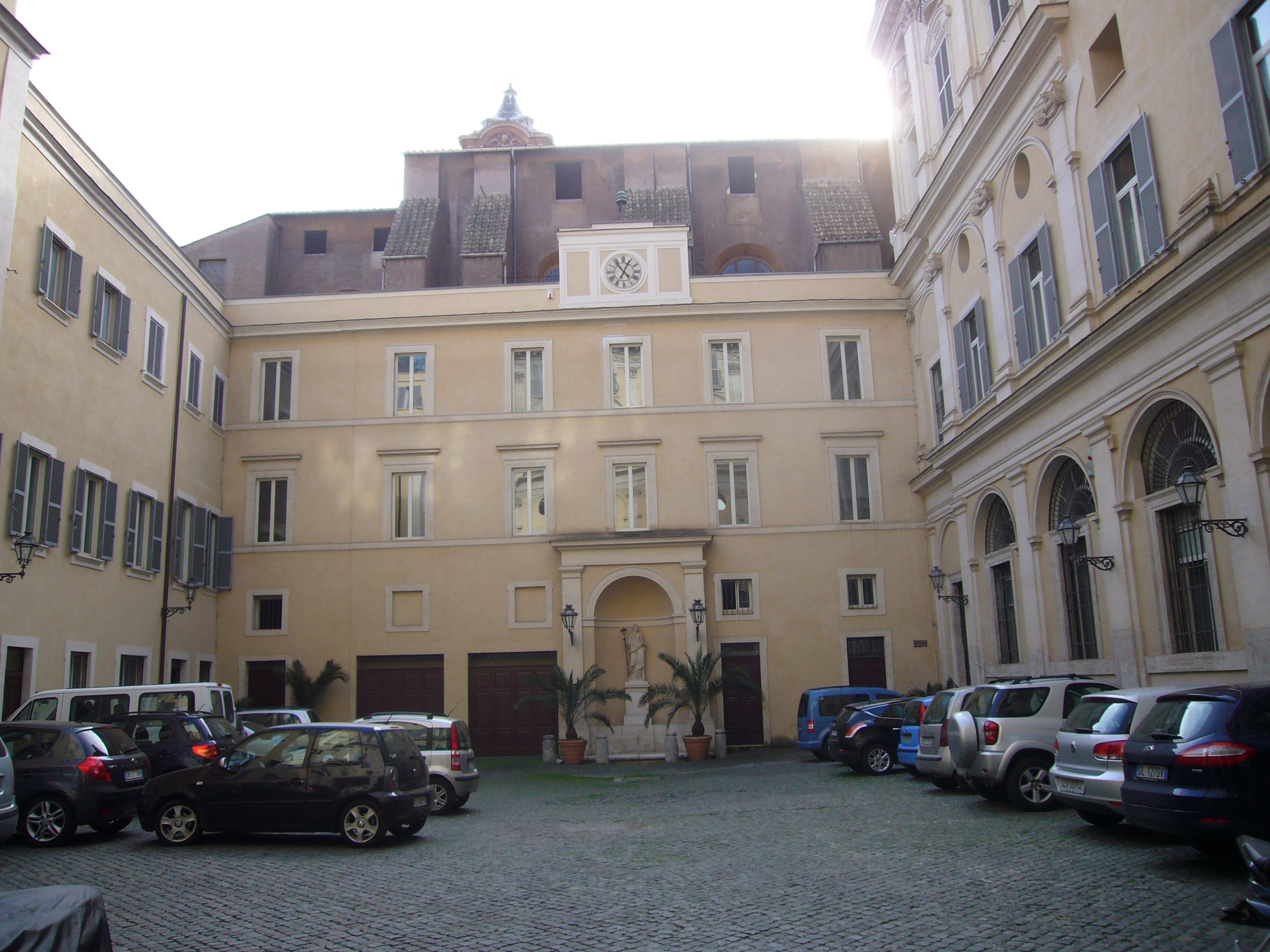
Palazzo Maffei Marescotti, Rome

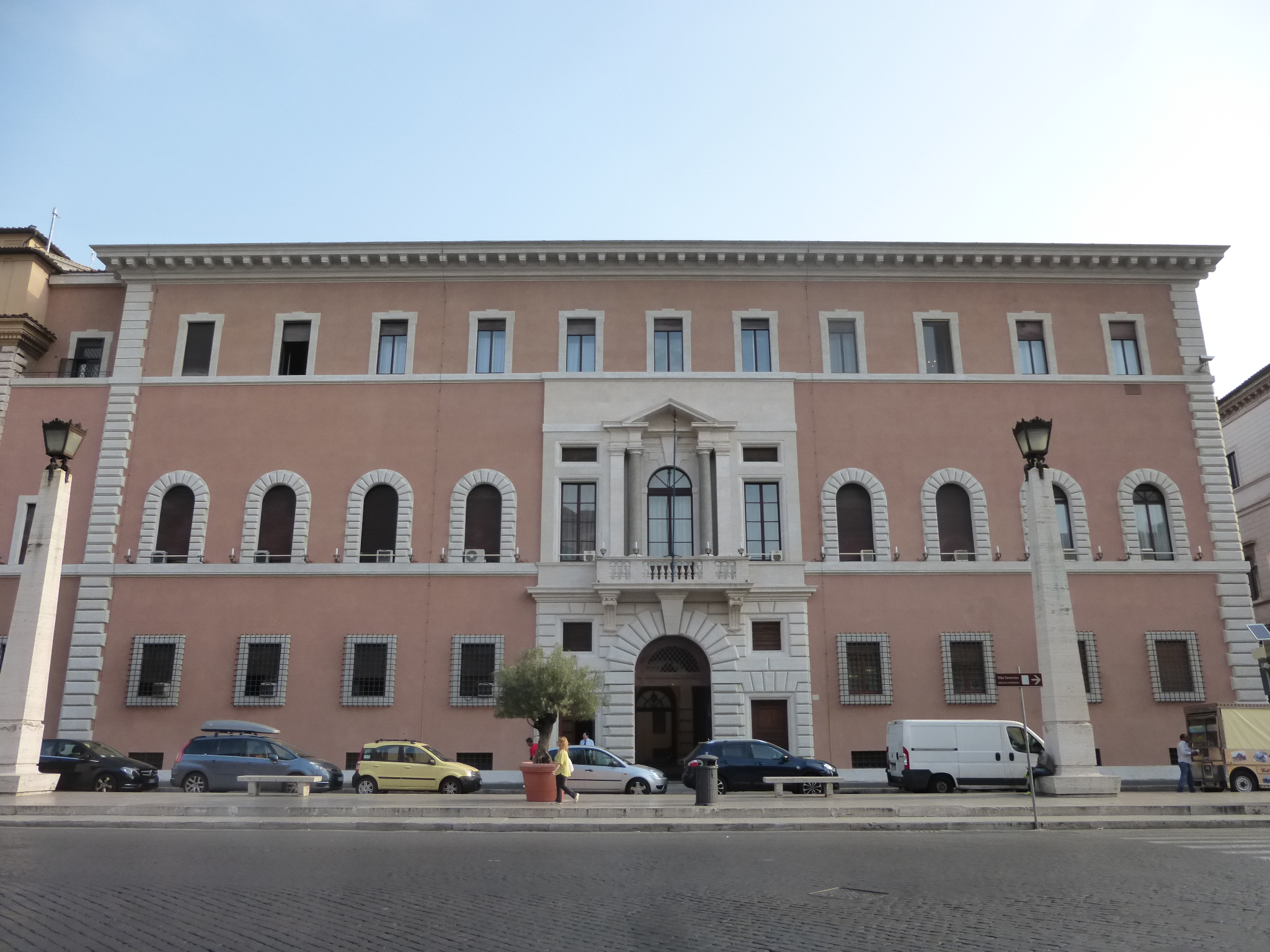
Palazzo dei Convertendi, Rome

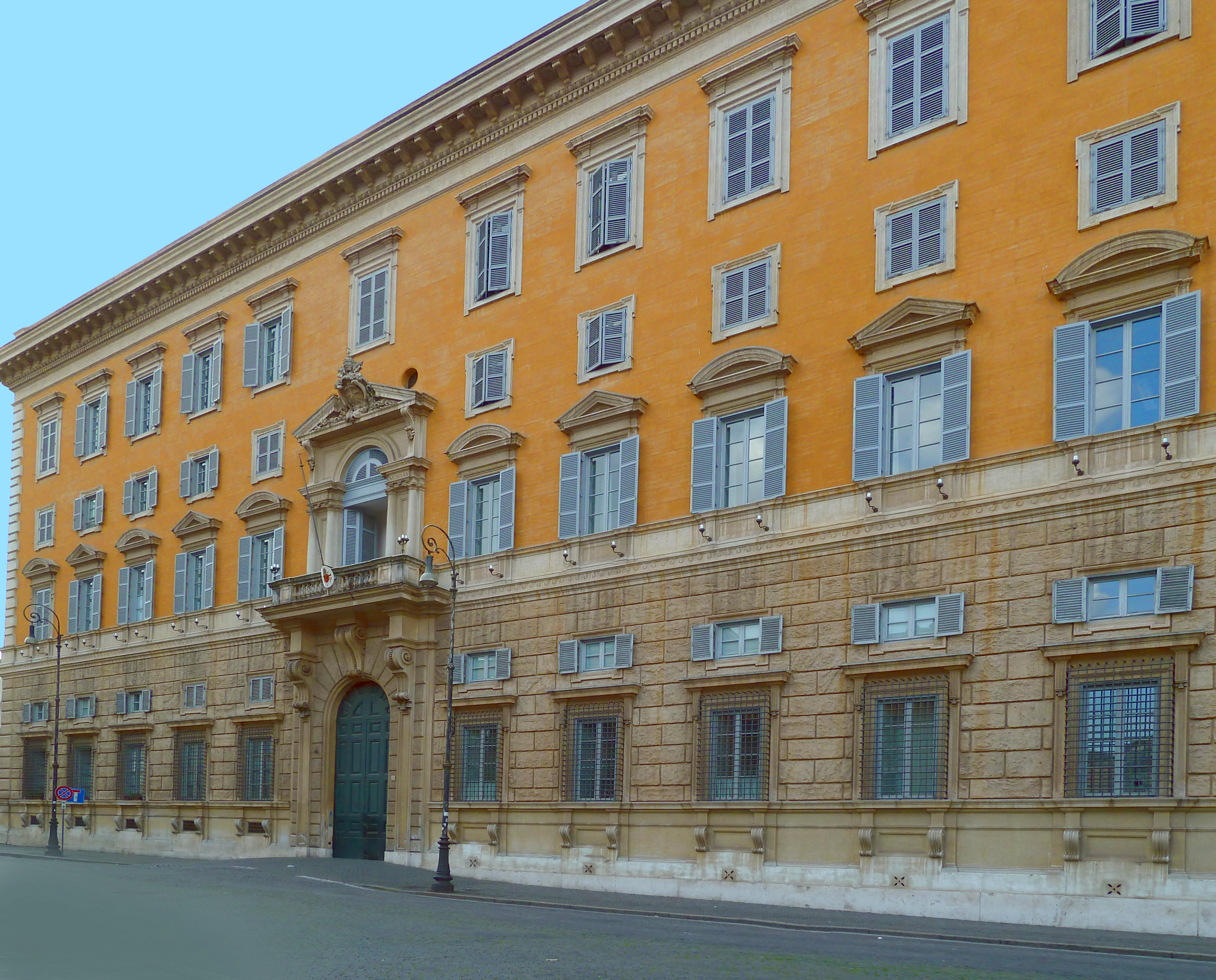
Palace of the Holy Office, Rome

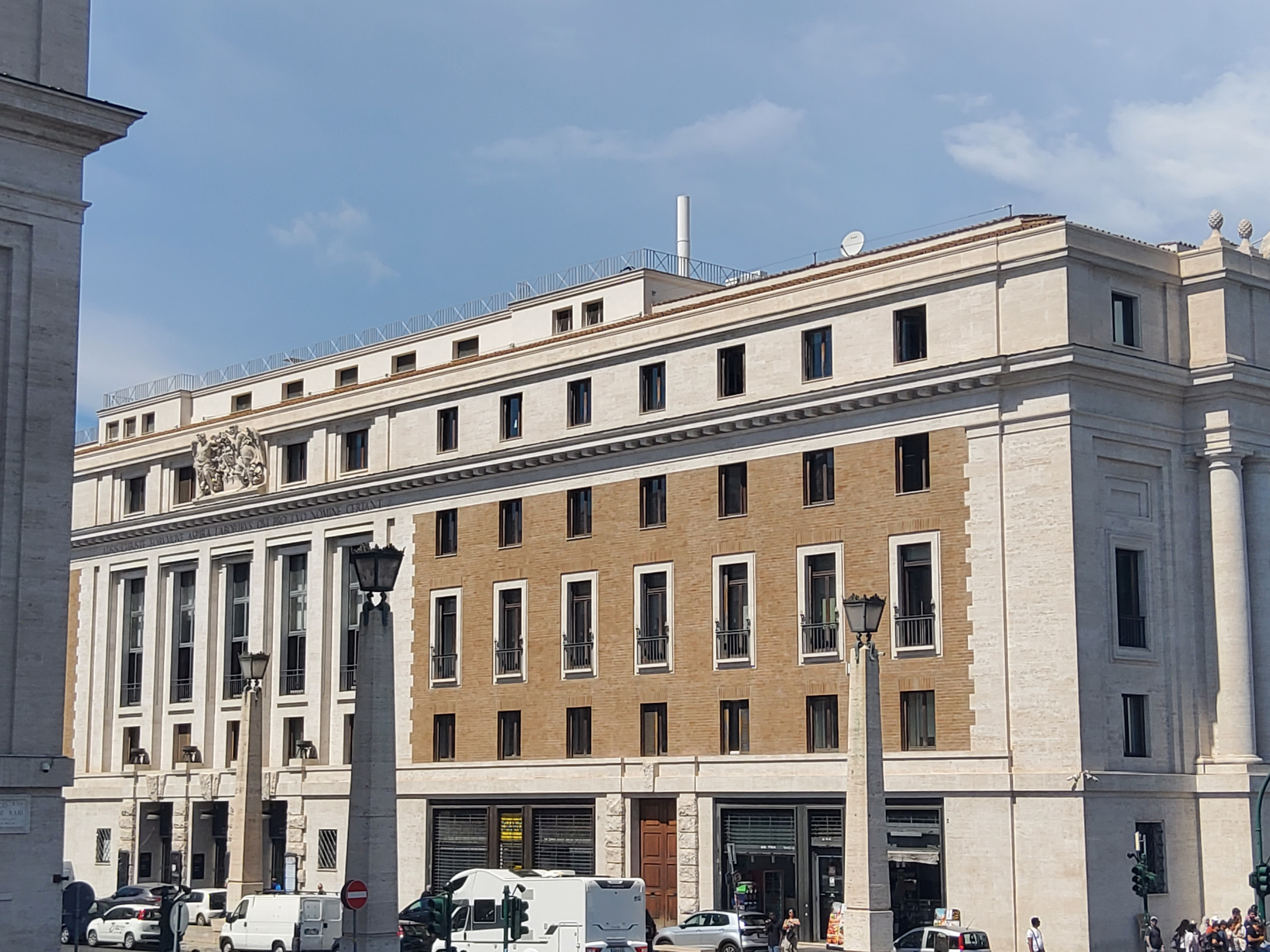
Palazzo San Pio X, Rome

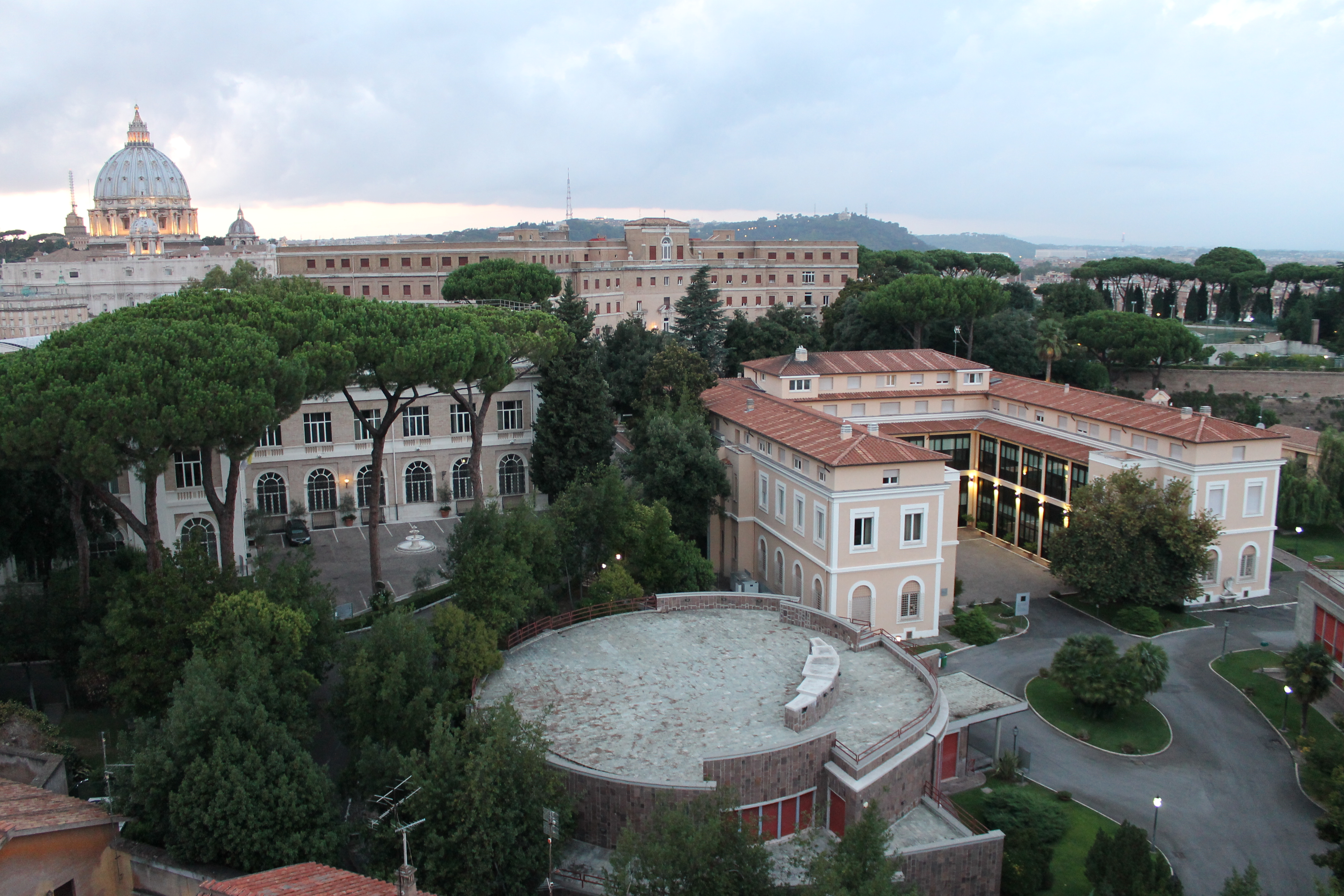
Pontifical Urban University, Rome

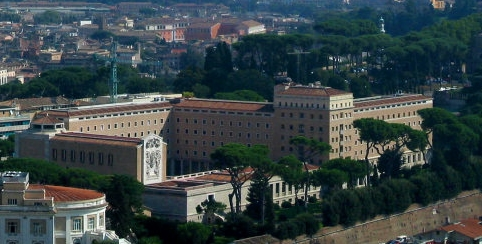
Pontifical North American College, Rome

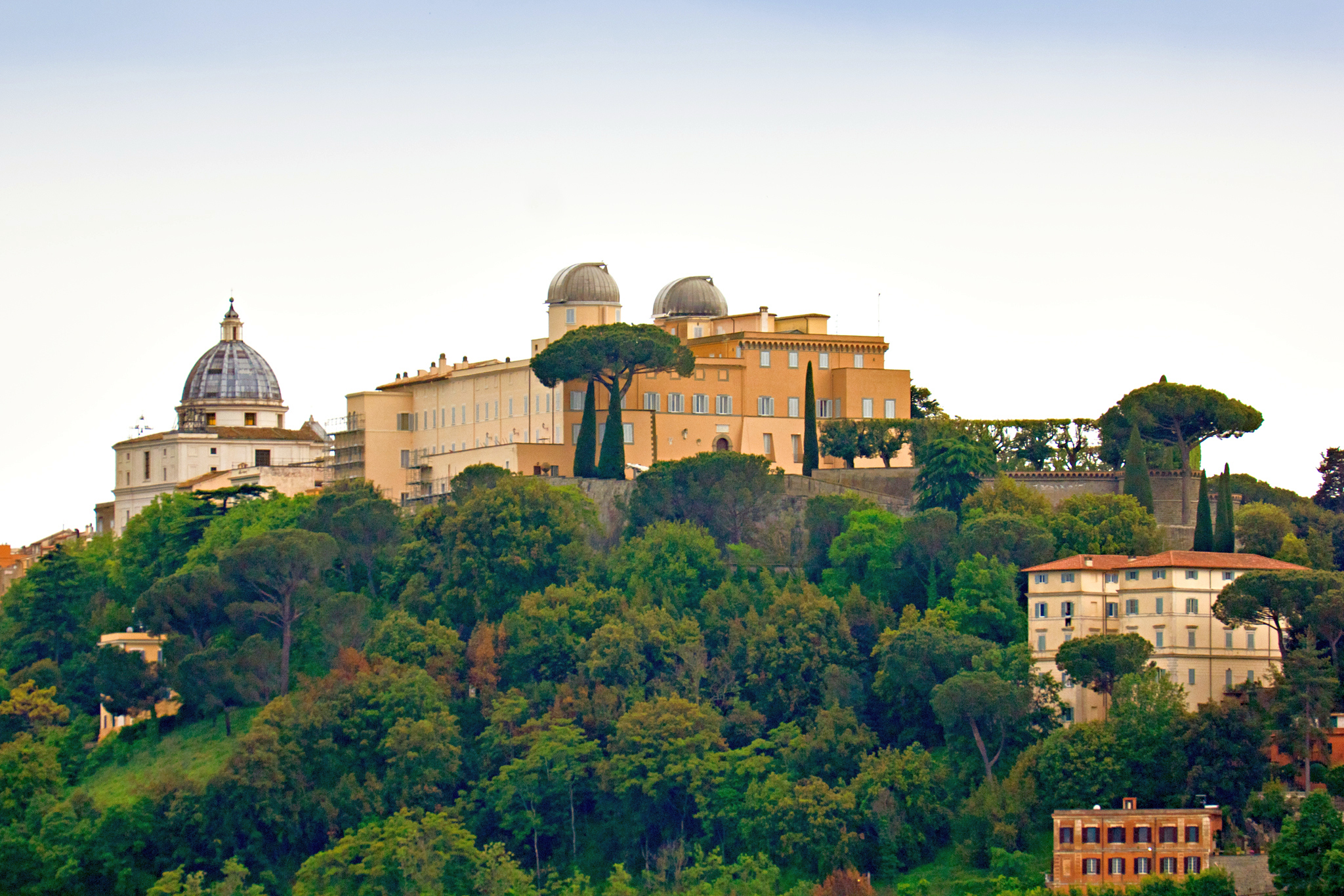
Papal Palace in Castel Gandolfo

== See also ==
- Papal States
- Vatican City
