= Palazzo Maffei Marescotti =

Palace of Maffei Marescotti
- Palazzo Maffei Marescotti or Palazzo del Vicariato
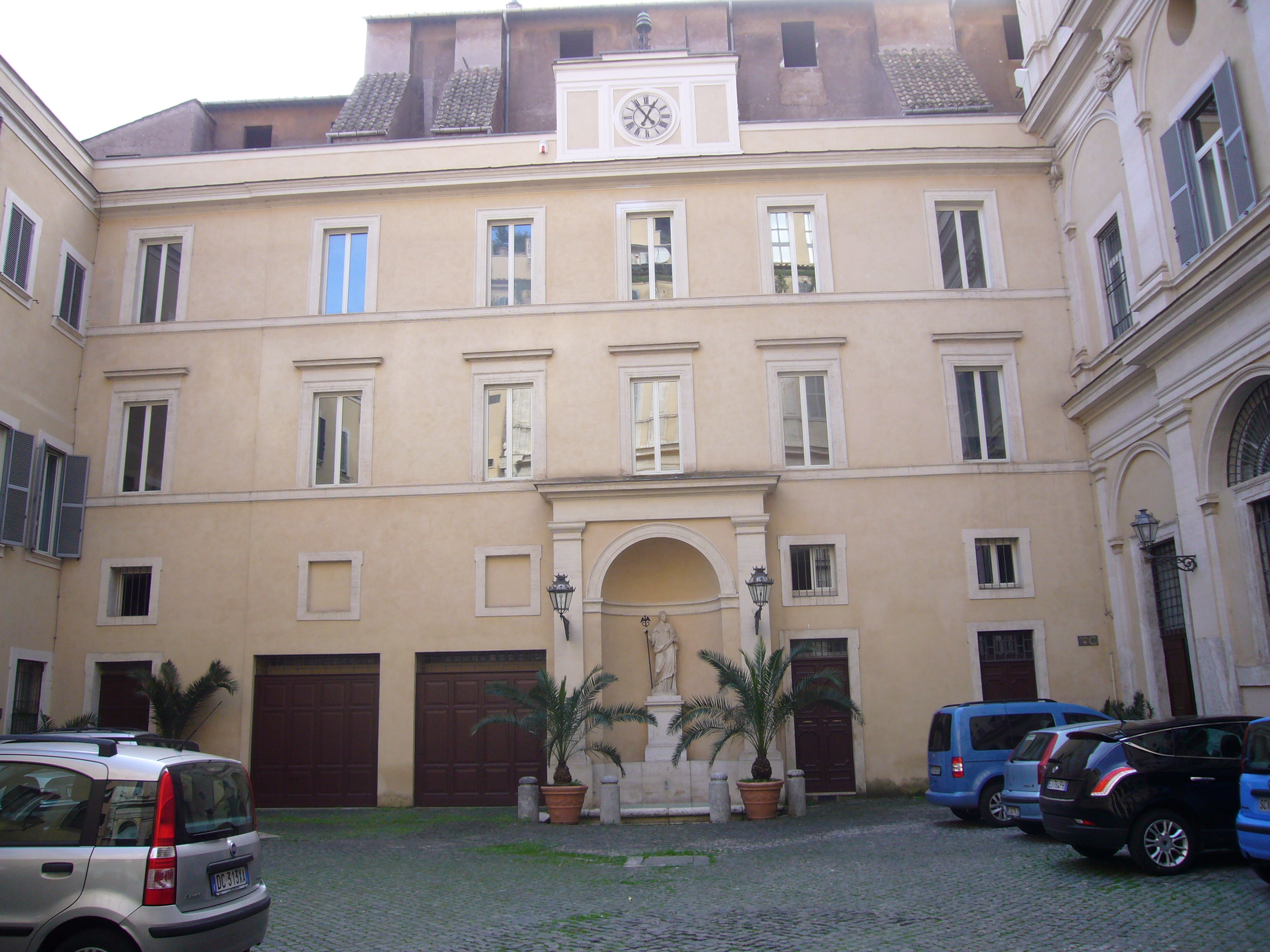
- Palace Courtyard

General information
- Architectural style: Baroque
- Location: Rome; Italy
- Coordinates: 41°53′48″N 12°28′39″E
- Owner: Holy See

The Palazzo Maffei Marescotti (Italian: Palazzo Maffei Marescotti or Palazzo del Vicariato) or Palace of the Vicariate is a religious building in Rome, Italy.

It is an ancient palace, originally a nobiliary palace, located in the Rione Pigna, on the corner of Via dei Cestari and Via della Pigna, next to the Church of the Holy Stigmata of St. Francis.

The palace was designed in 1580 by Giacomo Della Porta on behalf of Cardinal Marcantonio Maffei, which involved the demolition of some houses of families, who were in the Piazza della Pigna in front of the building that had been the family of Stefano Porcari. After the death of the Cardinal Maffei reached in 1583 and the unfinished building began a long series of changes of ownership and different uses. The Count Marescotti in the 18th-century refurbished the palace using the services of the architect Ferdinando Fuga.

== See also ==
- Banca Romana
- Properties of the Holy See
