= Lateran Palace =

Ancient palace of the Roman Empire and papal residence in Rome

Apostolic Palace of the Lateran
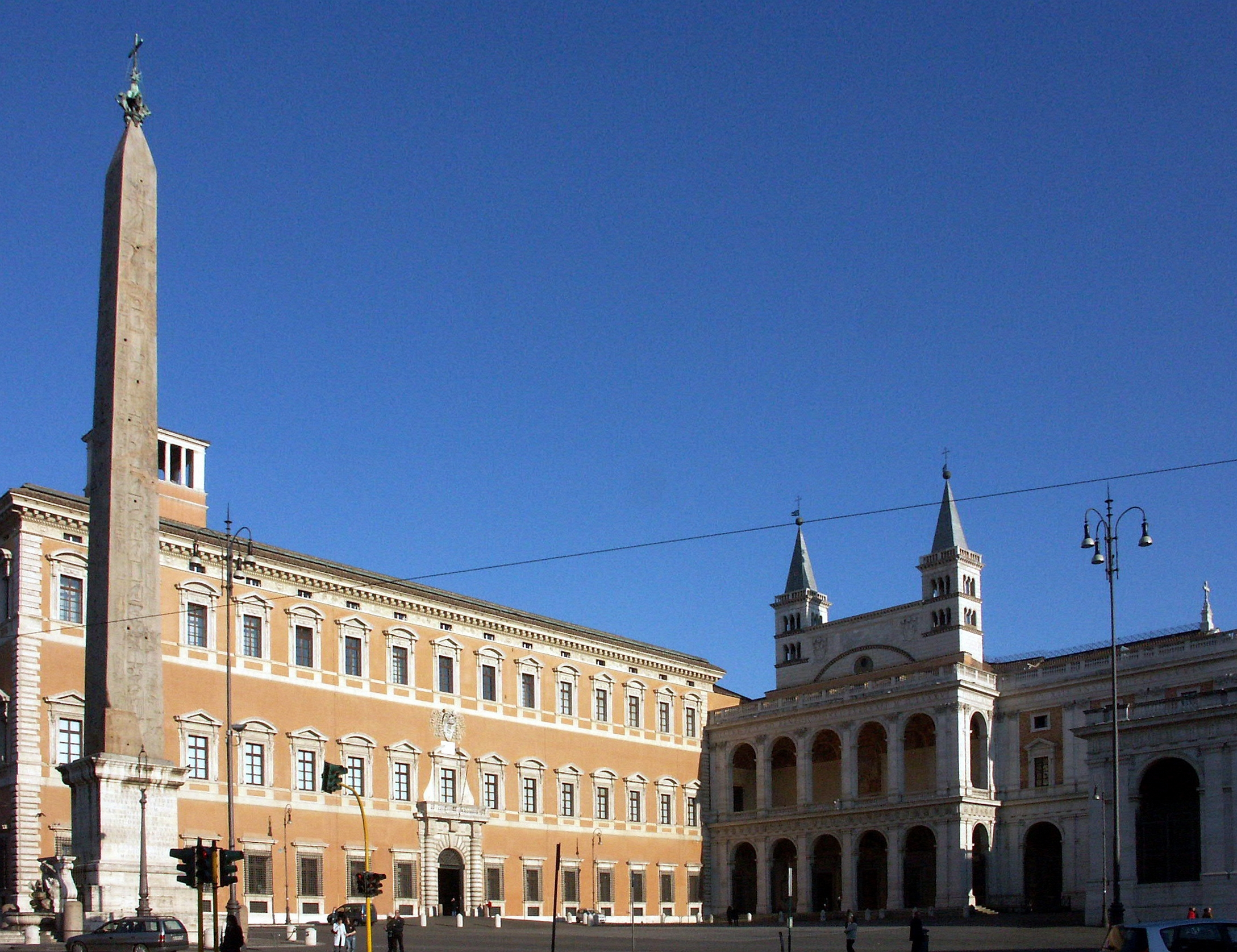
- Saint John in Lateran square with the Lateran Palace (left) and the Archbasilica of Saint John Lateran (right) and the Obelisk of the Egyptian Pharaoh Thutmosis III in front
- Click on the map for a fullscreen view. Lateran marked at center, and with Vatican in gray outline at left.

General information
- Location: Saint John's Square in Lateran on the Caelian Hill, Rome, Italy
- Coordinates: 41°53′12″N 12°30′19″E

Website
- palazzolateranense.com

The Apostolic Palace of the Lateran (Latin: Palatium Apostolicum Lateranense), informally the Lateran Palace (Latin: Palatium Lateranense; Italian: Palazzo del Laterano), is an ancient palace of the Roman Empire and later the main papal residence in Rome.

Located on Saint John's Square in Lateran on the Caelian Hill, the palace is adjacent to the Archbasilica of Saint John Lateran, the cathedral church of Rome. The wealthy Lateran (Laterani) family held the palace estate during the Roman Empire, and the estate eventually came into the hands of the Emperor Constantine the Great who gifted it to Pope Miltiades who was residing at the Basilica of Santa Pudenziana.

From the fourth century, the palace was the principal residence of the popes and continued so for about a thousand years until the Apostolic Residence ultimately moved to the nearby Vatican. The palace is now used by the Vatican Historical Museum, which illustrates the history of the Papal States. The palace also houses the offices of the Diocese of Rome, as well as the residential apartments of the Cardinal Vicar, the pope's delegate for the daily administration of the diocese. Until 1970, the palace was also home to the important collections of the Lateran Museum, now dispersed among it and other parts of the Vatican Museums.

The building that stands today, after many waves of construction and destruction since Roman times, is nearly all from the rebuilding begun in the 1580s to the designs of Domenico Fontana. This is a rectangular building with a central courtyard, higher but less sprawling and so smaller than the medieval palace, of which only fragments remain, themselves largely rebuilt later. The Leonian Triclinium, the end wall of a great medieval hall, and the Santa Scala or "Holy steps" are the largest of these. These are now incorporated into a separate building across the square from the main palace.

Following the Lateran Treaty of 1929, the palace and adjoining basilica are extraterritorial properties of the Holy See. (Note: The basilica and the palace, which are owned by the Holy See (article 13 of the Lateran Treaty), Archived 2011-08-13 at the Wayback Machine "form(s) part of the territory of the Italian State (but) enjoy(s) the immunities granted by International Law to the headquarters of the diplomatic agents of foreign States" (article 15 of the Lateran Treaty).)

== History ==
=== Pre-papal use ===
The site on which the Basilica di San Giovanni in Laterano sits was occupied during the early Roman Empire by the domus of the Plautii Laterani family. The Laterani served as administrators for several emperors; their ancestor Lucius Sextius Lateranus is said to have been the first plebeian to attain the rank of consul, in 366 BC. One of the Laterani, Consul-designate Plautius Lateranus, became famous for being accused by Nero of conspiracy against the emperor. The accusation resulted in the confiscation and redistribution of his properties.

=== Constantinian era ===
The Domus Laterani came into the possession of the emperor when Constantine I married his second wife Fausta, sister of Maxentius. Around 312, Constantine had razed the imperial horse-guards barracks adjoining the palace, which was known as Domus Faustae or "House of Fausta" by this time; the equites singulares Augusti had supported Maxentius against Constantine. He commissioned the construction of the Basilica di San Giovanni in Laterano on the site.

The Domus Laterani was eventually given to the Bishop of Rome by Constantine I. It is believed that this happened during the pontificate of Pope Miltiades, in time to host a synod of bishops in 313 that was convened to challenge the Donatists.

=== Medieval Palace ===
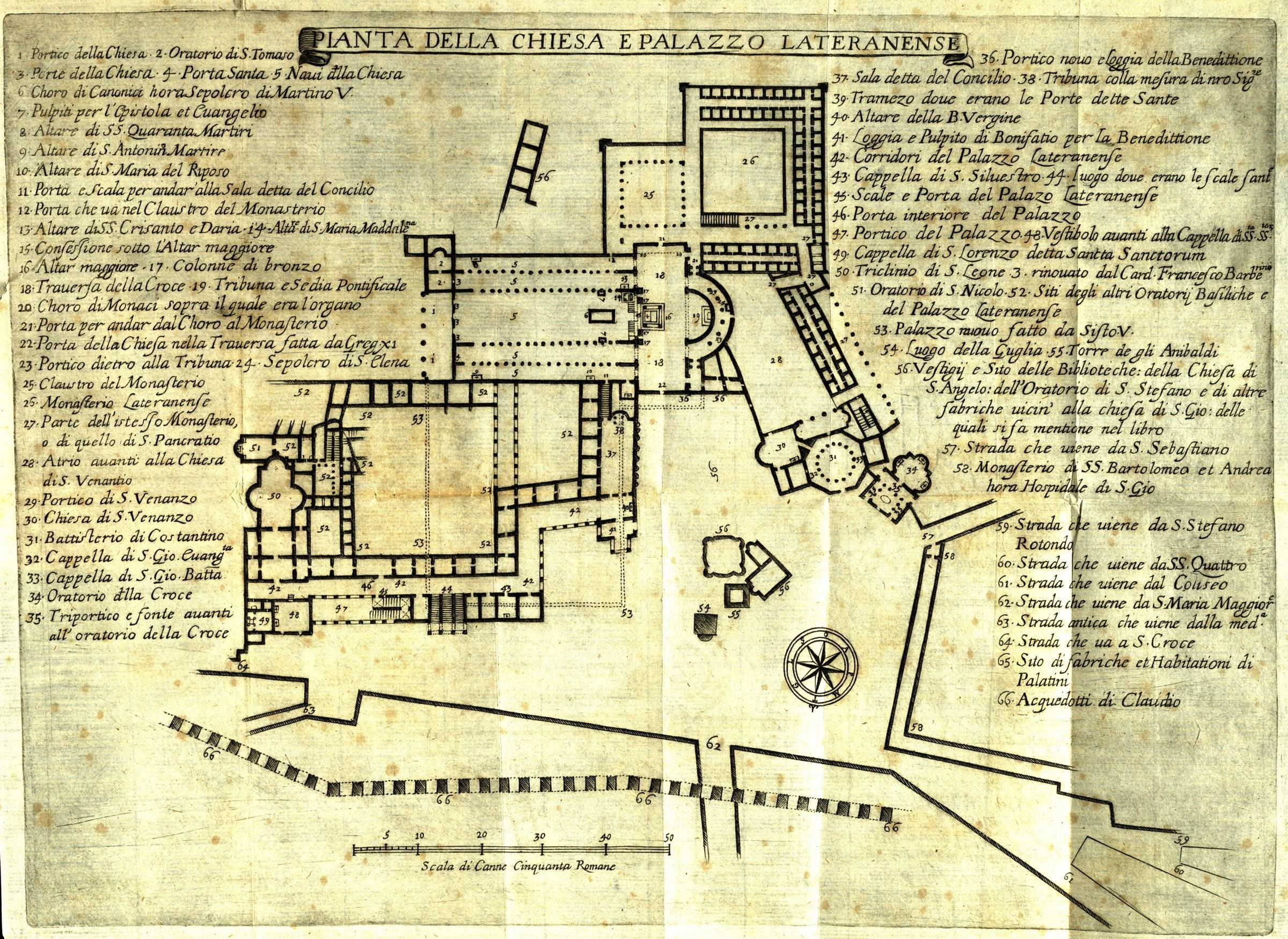
Plan of the Lateran church palace before the 1580s interventions of Pope Sixtus V

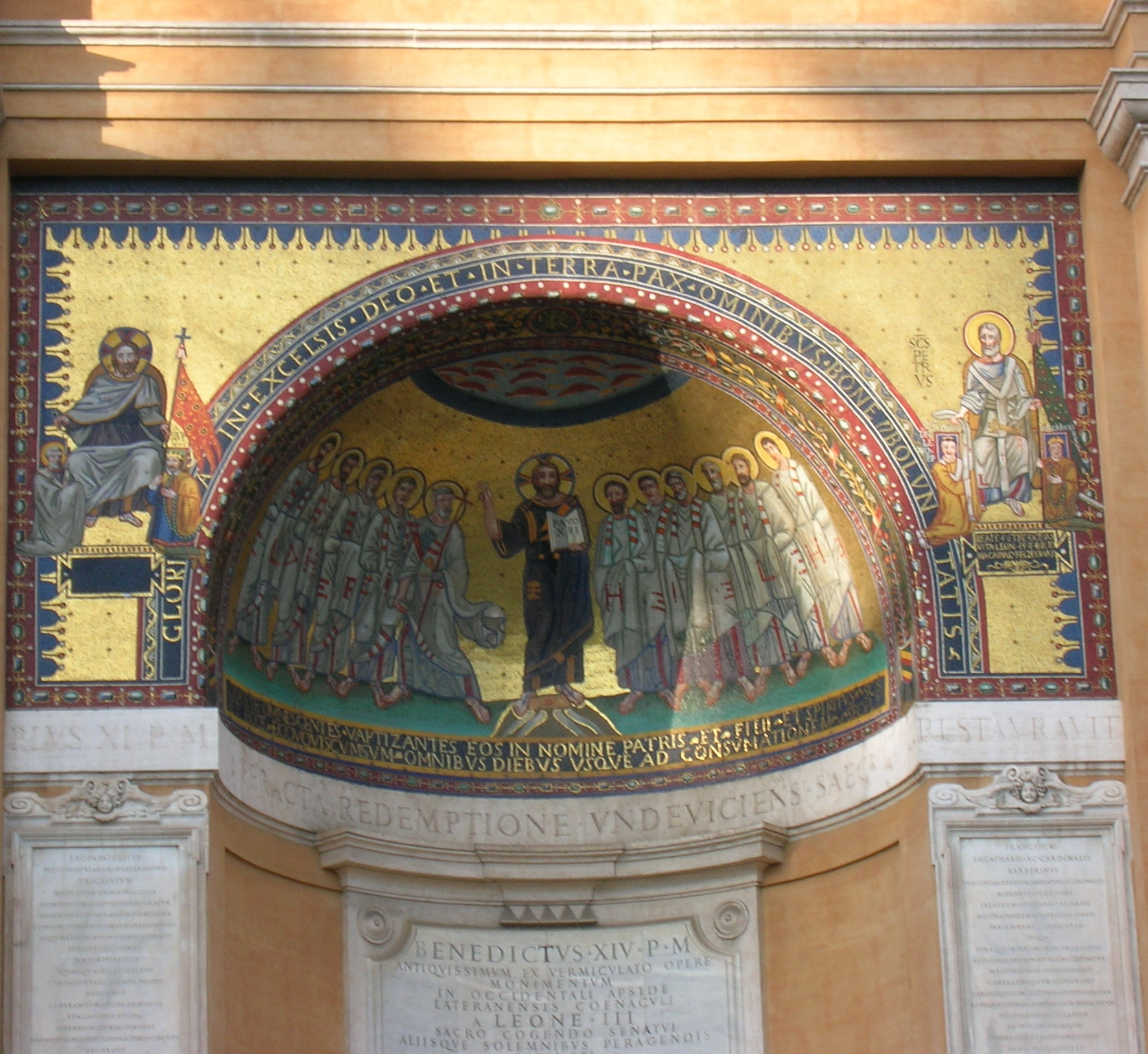
Copy of the Byzantine mosaics that used to be on the apse of the Leonian Triclinium, one of the main halls of the ancient Lateran palace

As Byzantium grew less able to help prevent Lombard incursions, the papacy became more independent of the Empire. Prior to the early eighth century, the residence of the bishops of Rome was not called a palace, but rather the "Lateran patriarchate" (patriarchium). The incentive to refurbish the Lateran patriarchate as a true palace was to create an imperial residence from which the pope could exercise not only spiritual but also temporal authority.

The pope's palace at the Lateran in Rome was extensively added to in the late eighth century by Pope Hadrian I (772–95) and Pope Leo III (795–816). Pope Hadrian I restructured the portico by the entrance staircase (Zaccaria's portico) and erected another tower next to it, which functioned as residential space. This portico was used to distribute alms and was also the location of the statue of the Capitoline Wolf and the Lex de imperio Vespasiani tables.

Pope Leo III built two triclinia (the first known simply as the Triclinium or triclinium maius while the second one became known as Aula Concilii) around 800 to serve as the heart of papal ceremonial. Architecturally they were reminiscent of Byzantine imperial buildings in Constantinople. Both triclinia were ornate with mosaics and fountains, and were the location of papal ceremonies, banquets and meetings. The decorations had an explicitly political theme, and they were meant to be a symbol of papal power and authority.

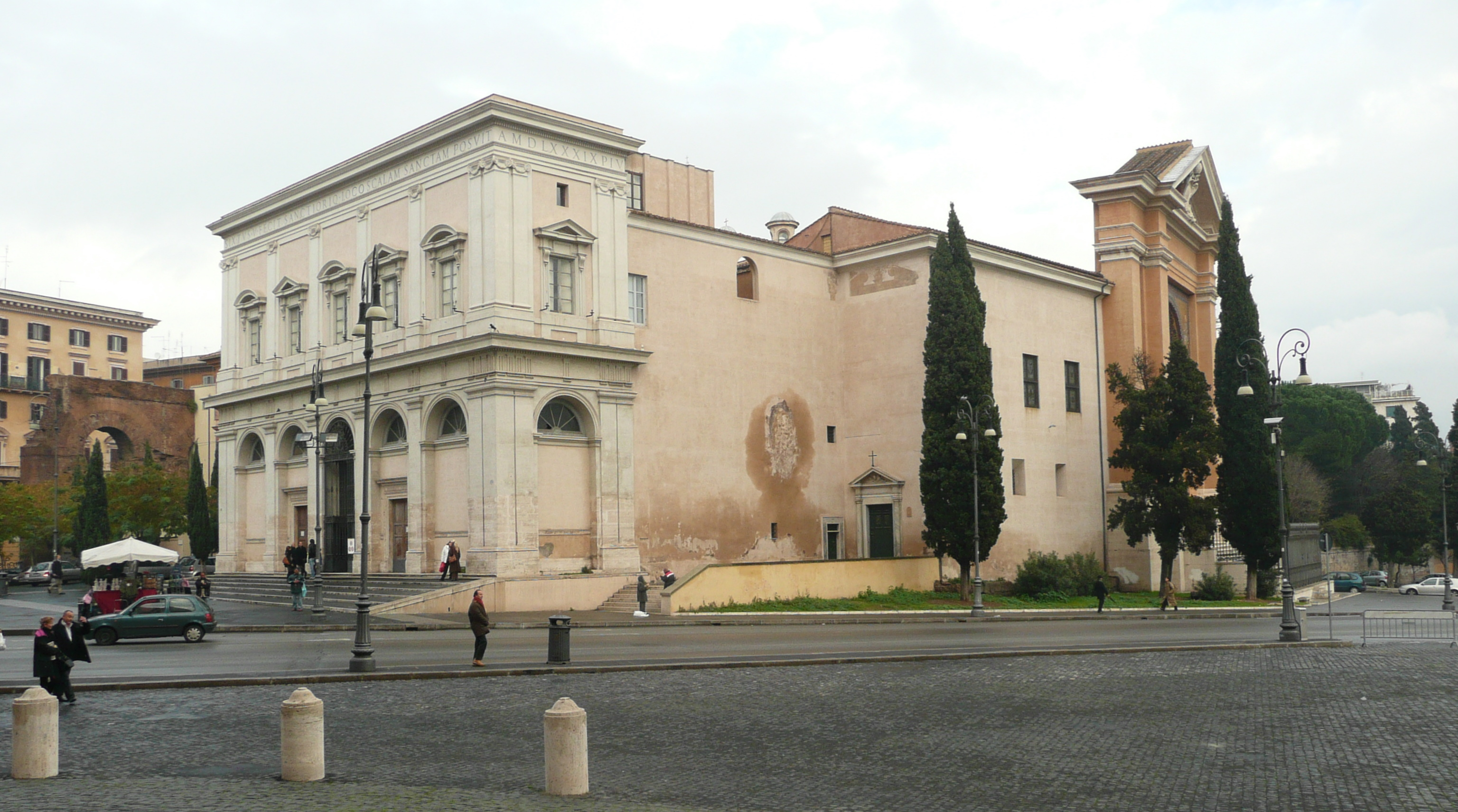
The remaining end wall of the Leonian Triclinium (right) shares a building with the Santa Scala (entrance at left), now across the square from the main Renaissance palace

The Leonian Triclinium or triclinium maius was one of the most famous halls of the ancient palace and was the state banqueting hall, lined with mosaics. It was a two-story structure, 50m long. The upper floor was constituted of a large 26 meter long main chamber with a main apse at the end and one apse on each side, and a rectangular entrance antechamber, maybe with a portico. Frescoes covered the two apses projecting the main chamber and the two apses in the antechamber, while the main apse was covered in a mosaic and hosted the papal throne. Nothing remains of this, but in 1743 copies of the mosaics were made from drawings and placed in a specially built structure opposite the palace. The existing structure is not ancient, but a representation of the original mosaics is preserved in a three-part mosaic: In the centre Christ gives their mission to the Apostles; on the left he gives the keys to St. Peter and the Labarum to Constantine; while on the right St. Peter gives the stole to Leo III and the standard to Charlemagne, an image meant to represent the Frankish king's duty to protect the Church.

The second triclinium built by Leo III, also known as the Aula Concilii ("Hall of the Council" or Sala del Concilio in Italian), was situated next to the basilica and in perpendicularly to it. It was a magnificent oblong hall (53 m long by 13 wide) with eleven apses, the major apse on one end and five on each side. The side apses had a diameter of 6.7 meters and were 2.34 meters apart, while the end ones were 4.47 meters away from the front and end walls. A large Porphyry fountain was placed in front of the main apse, spouting jets of water from pressurized pipes of the restored Aqua Claudia, a technical marvel meant to impress visitors. Each of the 10 lateral apses held accubita for banquets, on the model of the reception hall of the 19 accubita in the Great Palace of Constantinople. The main apse was decorated with a mosaic showing Christ and Mary with Saints Peter and Paul and three other figures, while each of the ten lateral apses was decorated with frescoes depicting an apostle preaching to the gentiles. On the left of the main apse was a staircase that led to the basilica. The hall was adorned with columns, pilasters, a floor in opus sectile. A drawing by Pompeo Ugonio (BAV, Cod. Barb. lat. 2160, fol.157v) survives as evidence of its structure and ornamentation.

Leo III and his successor Paschal I (817–24) decorated the Sancta Sanctorum (“Holy of Holies”, the private papal chapel) with new jeweled reliquaries and a reliquary chest modeled on the Ark of the Covenant, which stored some of Rome’s most precious relics. Around the 820s the Liber Pontificalis starts calling the complex a palace, palatium.

The private apartments of the popes in this palace were situated between the triclinium and the city walls. It later was called Aula Concilii ("Hall of the Council") due to its role as a place of meetings.

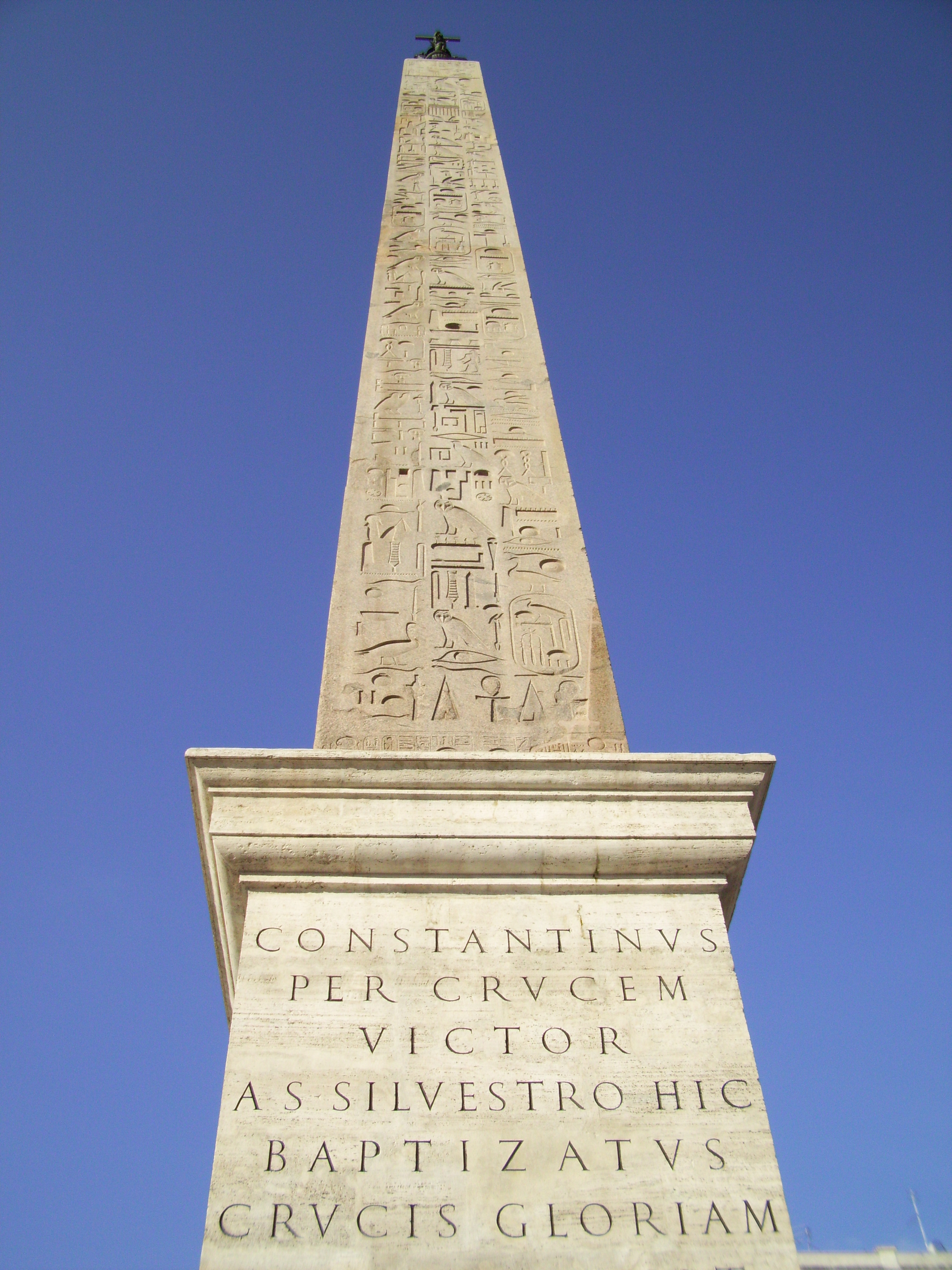
Base of obelisk with citation of Emperor Constantine I

In the tenth century Sergius III restored the palace after a disastrous fire, and later it was greatly embellished by Innocent III. This was the period of its greatest magnificence, when Dante speaks of it as beyond all human achievements. At this time the centre of the piazza was occupied by the palace and tower of the Annibaldi family.

After the Great Schism of 1054, the Lateran palace was the venue of the first ecumenical council to be held in Western Europe in 1123. Four other ecumenical councils (in 1139, in 1179, in 1213 and in 1512) were also held in this site.

Between this palace and the Lateran Basilica was the equestrian statue of Marcus Aurelius, which at the time was erroneously believed to represent the Christian Emperor Constantine (which association probably accounted for its preservation). A copy of the equestrian statue is now placed in the centre of the Capitoline Square while the original has been safely preserved for display in the Capitoline Museums.

Boniface VIII added the Loggia delle Benedizioni to the northern side of the Aula Concilii.

In its place, the Lateran obelisk was erected. Originally commissioned by the 18th dynasty Pharaoh Thuthmosis III, it was completed by his grandson, Thuthmosis IV. At 32.18 m (45.70 m including the base) it is the tallest obelisk in Rome and the largest standing ancient Egyptian obelisk in the world, weighing over 230 tons. Following the annexation of Egypt to the Empire, it was taken from the temple of Amun in Karnak (Note: Geographic location: 25°43′7.46″N 32°39′26.64″E) and brought to Alexandria with another obelisk by Constantius II. From there it was brought on its own to Rome in 357 to decorate the spina of the Circus Maximus. The dedication on the base, however, gives the glory to Constantine I, not to his son who brought it to Rome.

=== Avignon Papacy ===
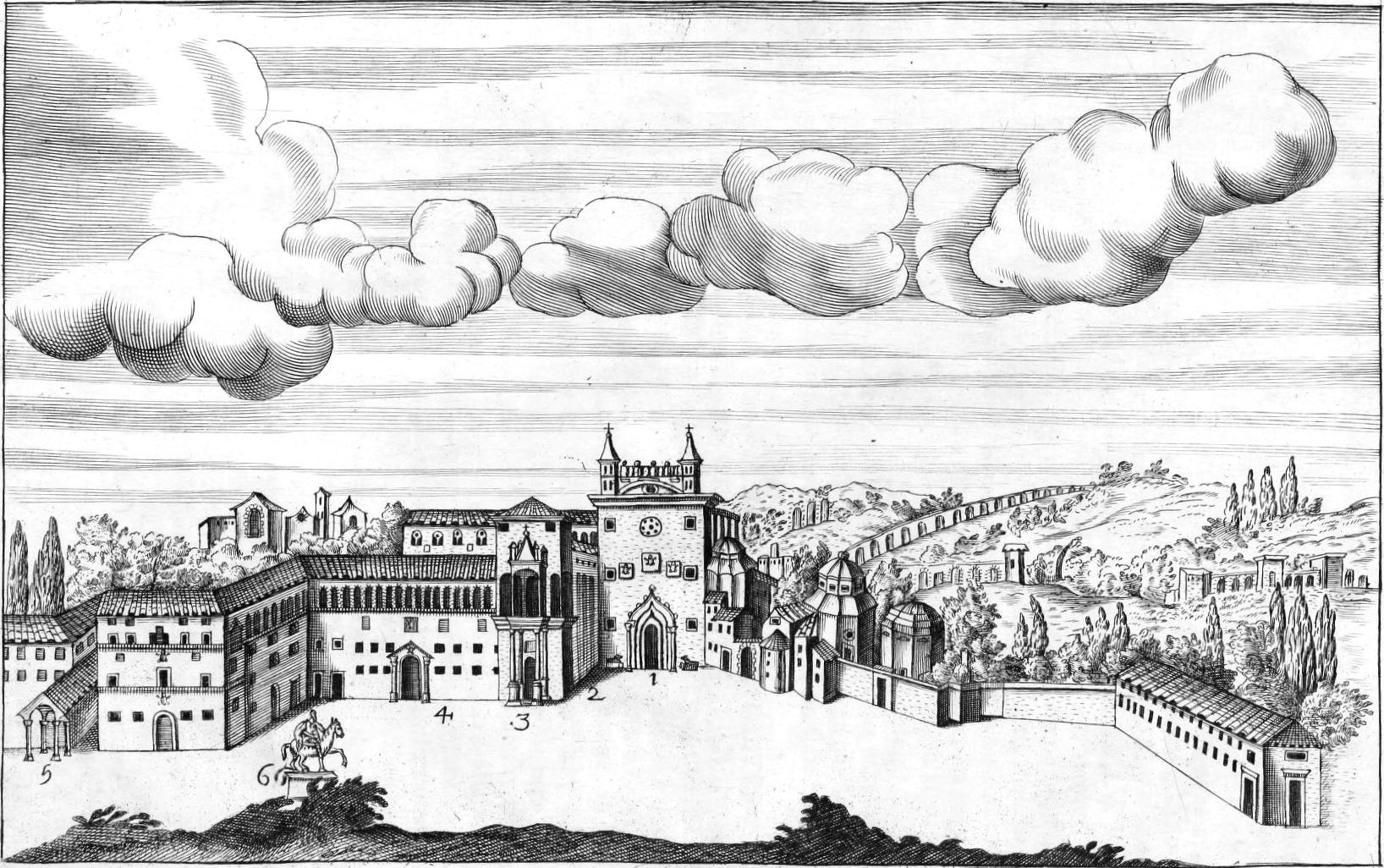
The Lateran during medieval times, from a 17th-century engraving by Giovanni Giustino Ciampini

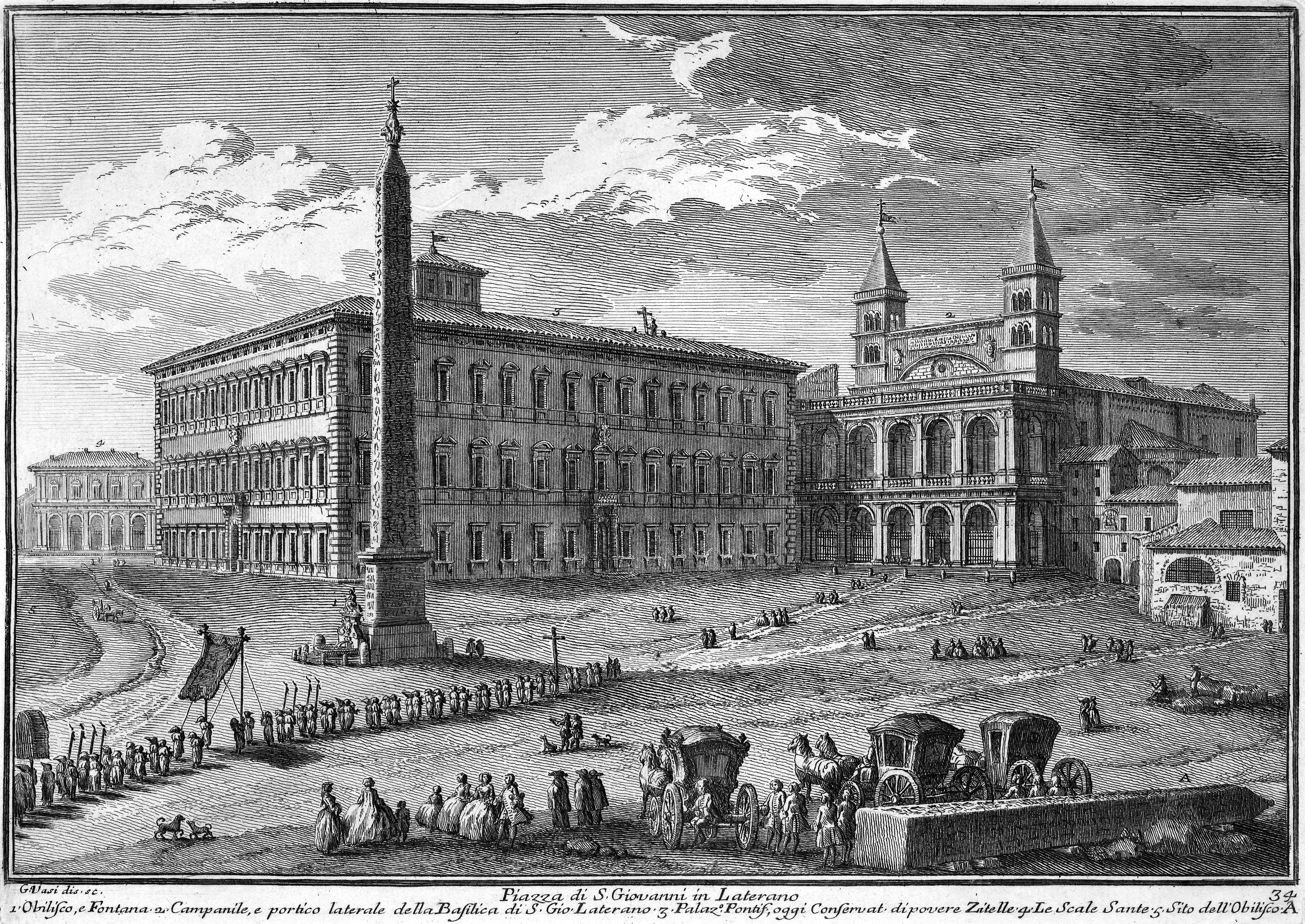
The Lateran after its reconstruction, from an 18th-century engraving by Giuseppe Vasi

The fall of the palace from this position of glory was the result of the departure of the popes from Rome during the Avignon Papacy.

Two destructive fires, in 1307 and 1361, did irreparable harm, and although vast sums were sent from Avignon for the rebuilding, the palace never again attained its former splendour. The palace had Gothic architectural elements at this point. When the popes returned to Rome they resided first at Basilica di Santa Maria in Trastevere, then at Basilica di Santa Maria Maggiore, and lastly fixed their residence at the Vatican. St. Peter's Basilica, also built by Constantine, had until then served primarily as a pilgrimage church. Sixtus V, more concerned with rationalized urban planning than the preservation of antiquities, then destroyed what still remained of the ancient palace of the Lateran in 1586 preserving only the Sancta Sanctorum, and erected the present much smaller edifice in its place, designed by his favorite architect Domenico Fontana.

=== 16th-century building ===
The architect he employed immediately upon his election was Domenico Fontana, who was engaged in alterations to the basilica at the same time. Fontana's strong, restrained style was influenced by Giacomo Vignola and modeled upon Palazzo Farnese for its regular and harmonious if somewhat bland major façade. Fontana's sound engineering basis and power of coordinating a complicated architectural program on a tightly constrained site, which Sixtus urged forward at top speed, have been considered remarkable.

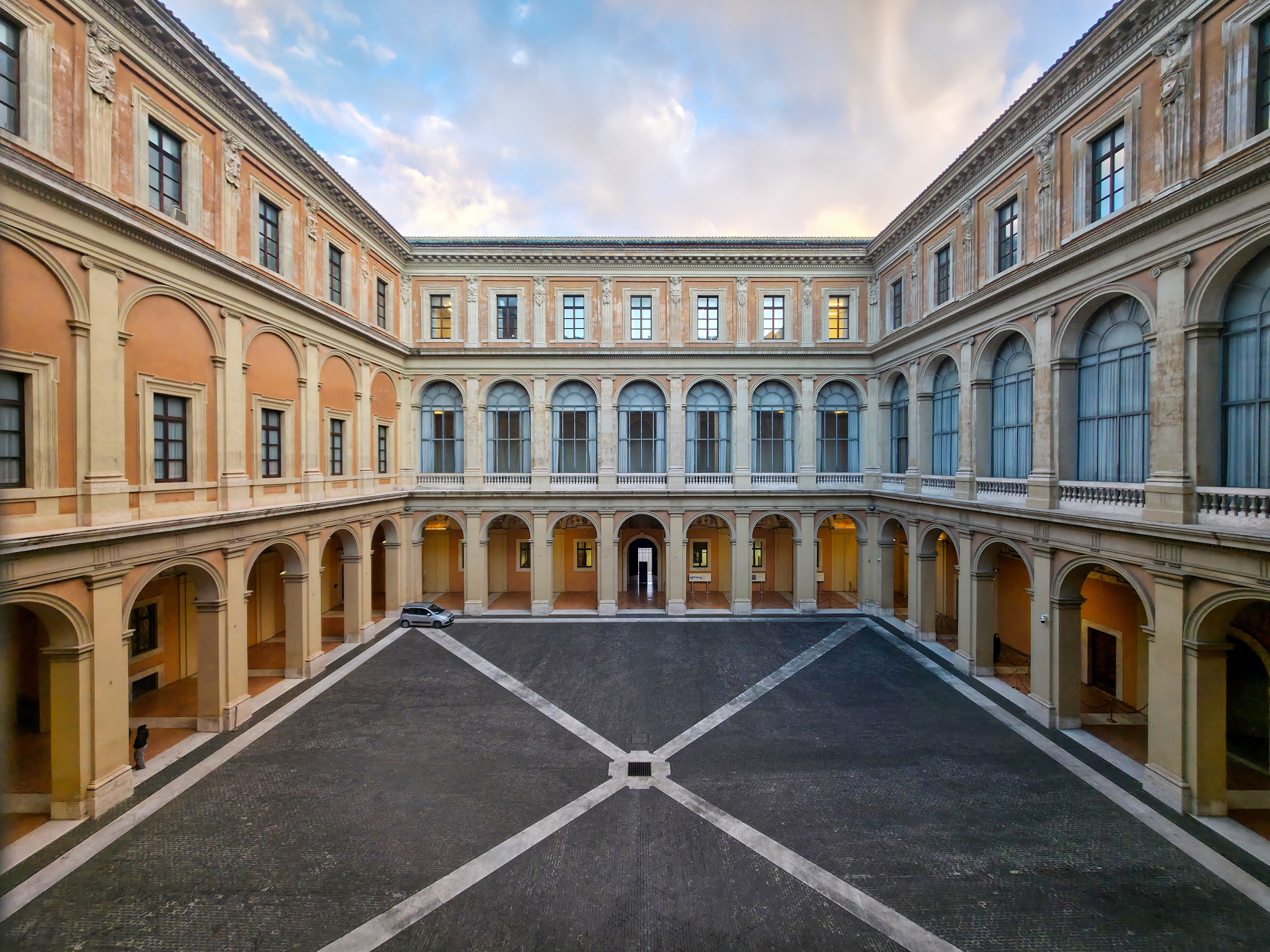
Lateran Palace Courtyard

A notice on 29 August 1589 announced that the work had been completed: "A great palace in Piazza Lateranese has been brought to completion by Sixtus V." Fontana reapplied motifs of the Lateran Palace in the part of the Vatican Palace containing the present papal apartments, which he undertook later, and in his additions to the Quirinal Palace. The east front was finished under Clement XII, who surmounted it with his coat-of-arms in 1735.

From the old Lateran constructions three monuments survive, two of which are located in one building built by Domenico Fontana in 1589 opposite the Lateran Basilica. These monuments are the Scala Santa and the Chapel of the Sancta Sanctorum.

== Modern use ==
The Lateran remained in a suburban environment, surrounded by gardens and vineyards, until the growth of modern Rome in the later nineteenth century. Its site was considered unhealthy in Rome's malarial summers, however. In the late seventeenth century, Innocent XII located, in a part of it, a hospice for orphans who were set to work in a little silk manufactory. In the nineteenth century, Gregory XVI and Pius IX founded at the Lateran a museum of religious art and pagan culture for overflow from the Vatican galleries.

In 1925 Pius XI established an ethnographic museum devoted to artifacts sent back by missionaries. On 11 February 1929, the Lateran Treaty was signed here, at last regulating the relations between the Holy See and the Italian State. It established that both the basilica and the Lateran Palace were extraterritorial properties of the Holy See, enjoying privileges similar to foreign embassies on Italian soil.

During the Second World War, the Lateran and its related buildings provided a safe haven from the Nazis and Italian Fascists for numbers of Jews and other refugees. Among those who found shelter there were Alcide De Gasperi, Pietro Nenni, Ivanoe Bonomi and others. The Daughters of Charity of Saint Vincent de Paul and the sixty orphan refugees they cared for were ordered to leave their convent on the Via Carlo Emanuele. The Sisters of Maria Bambina, who staffed the kitchen at the Pontifical Major Roman Seminary at the Lateran offered a wing of their convent. The grounds also housed Italian soldiers.

Fathers Vincenzo Fagiolo and Pietro Palazzini, vice-rector of the seminary, were recognized by Yad Vashem for their efforts to assist Jews.

=== Seat of the Vicariate of Rome ===
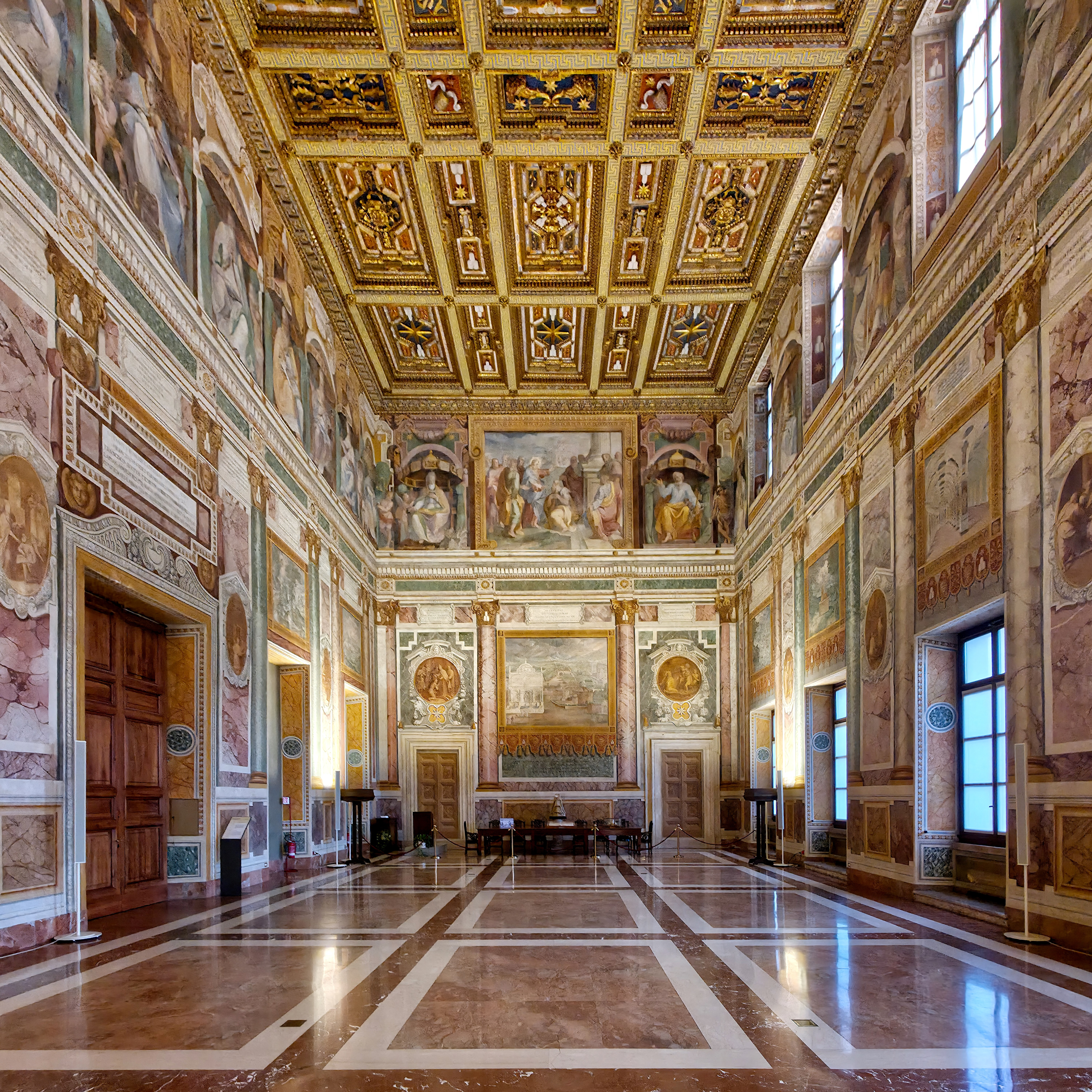
Lateran Palace interior

Pope John XXIII returned to the palace some pastoral functions by fixing here the seat of the vicariate and offices of the Diocese of Rome. He removed the collections of the Lateran Museum to the Vatican. Since 1987 the Lateran Palace has housed the Museo Storico Vaticano, which opened in 1991 and illustrates the history of the Papal States.

On 27 July 1993, a bomb explosion devastated the facade of the Rome Vicariate at the Archbasilica of Saint John Lateran. The attack is widely assumed to have been the work of the Italian Mafia, a warning against Pope John Paul II's frequent anti-Mafia statements. Repairs were completed in January 1996.

The palace houses the offices of the Vicariate of Rome and the living quarters of the cardinal vicar.

Tourists can visit the papal apartments, usually in the morning.

== See also ==
- Index of Vatican City–related articles
- Lateran buildings in Rome

== Bibliography ==
- Curzi, Gaetano (2016). "The Two Triclinia of Pope Leo III as 'Icons of Power'". IKON. 9: 141–152. doi:10.1484/J.IKON.4.00012. ISSN 1846-8551.
- Lex Bosman, Ian P. Haynes, Paolo Liverani, Lateran Basilica (2016 : British School at Rome). The Basilica of Saint John Lateran to 1600. Cambridge, UK. 2020. ISBN 978-1-108-88509-6. OCLC 1138996346.
- Le Pogam, Pierre-Yves (2013-05-02), "Chapitre préliminaire. Le Latran, le Vatican, Viterbe", De la « Cité de Dieu » au « Palais du Pape » : Les résidences pontificales dans la seconde moitié du XIIIe siècle (1254–1304), Bibliothèque des Écoles françaises d’Athènes et de Rome, Rome: Publications de l’École française de Rome, pp. 23–94, doi:10.4000/books.efr.172, ISBN 978-2-7283-0999-3, retrieved 2022-02-10
- Gigliozzi, Maria Teresa (2011). I palazzi del papa : architettura e ideologia : il Duecento. Roma: Viella. ISBN 978-88-8334-588-3. OCLC 776986586.
- Rohault de Fleury, Georges (1877). Le Latran au moyen âge: Tafelband. (in French). Paris: Vve A. Morel. OCLC 888873128.
- Rohault de Fleury, Georges (1877). Le Latran au moyen age. (in French). Paris: Vve A. Morel. OCLC 458130465.

== Notes ==
Preceded by Palazzo Giustiniani, Rome	Landmarks of Rome; Lateran Palace	Succeeded by Palazzo Madama, Rome
