= Vatican Historical Museum =

Museum in Rome, Italy

- Museo Storico Vaticano (San Giovanni)
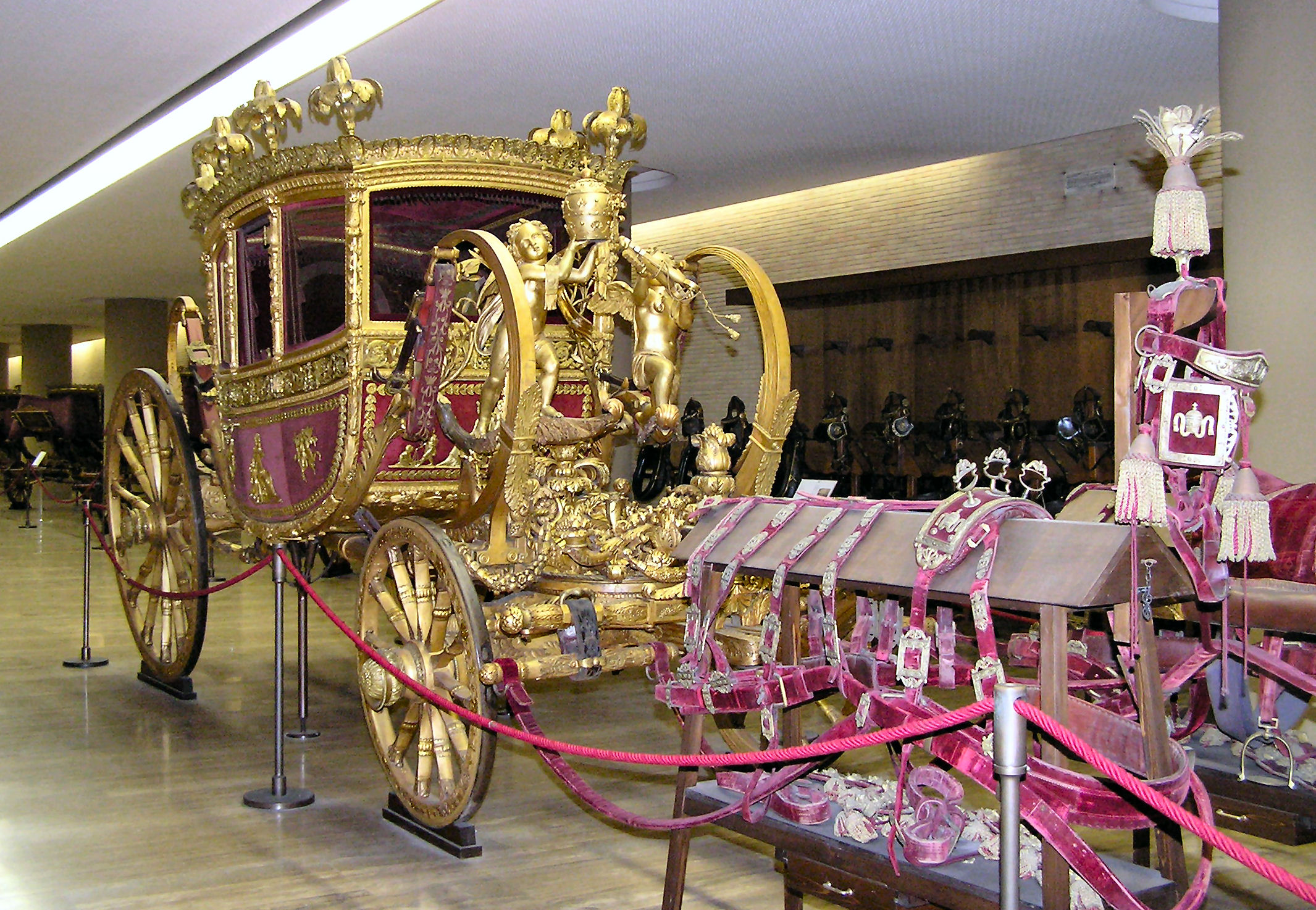
- Established: partly in 1973, finally in March 1991
- Location: Apostolic Palace of the Lateran, Rome
- Coordinates: 41°53′11.8″N 12°30′20.7″E
- Type: Historical
- Website: mv.vatican.va

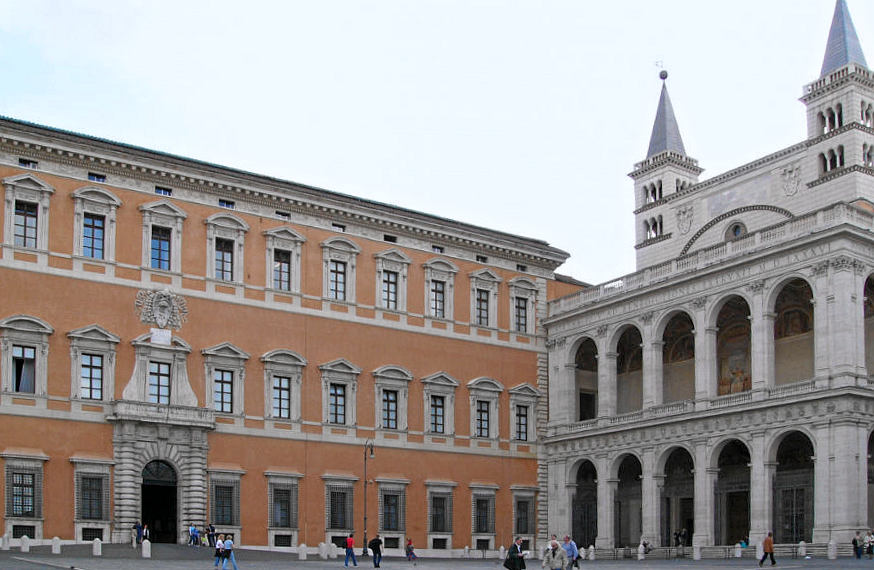
The San Giovanni in Laterano square with the Lateran Palace (left) and the Basilica di San Giovanni in Laterano (right).

The Vatican Historical Museum (Italian: Museo storico vaticano) is one of the sections of the Vatican Museums. It was founded in 1973 at the behest of Pope Paul VI, and was initially hosted in environments under the Square Garden. In 1987 it was moved to the main floor of the Apostolic Palace of the Lateran and opened in March 1991.

The Vatican Historical Museum has a unique collection of portraits of the Popes from the sixteenth century to date, objects from the 16–17th century Noble Guard, Palatine Guard and Papal Gendarmerie, and old religious paraphernalia related to rituals of the papacy. Also on display on the lower floor are the papamobili (Popemobiles); carriages and motorcars of Popes and Cardinals, including the first cars used by Popes.

== Layout ==
The Lateran Palace, which is next to the Basilica of Saint John Lateran to its left within the courtyard of the church with a common entry gate, is a large apartment complex of the Pope. Domenico Fontana was the architect of this palace which was built to his design in 1586. Right at the entrance the staircase is a massive and impressive structure with the ceiling decorated with frescoes. It had been refurbished by Pope Paul IV into ten halls; each of these halls had frescoes of the Mannerist Age. The hall known as the Conciliation, and was provided with allegories related to the papacy of Sixtus V. The other halls were named Constantine, Hall of Apostles, Emperors Room, Popes Room and so forth. The fresco decorations were on themes of the History of Rome, episodes of the Bible related to Daniel, David, Solomon, Samuel and others, and also related to the Gospel. Several colourful tapestries and Gobelins added to the aesthetic elegance of the halls. Before the History Museum decided to relocate here to a more luxurious locale, none of the rooms had been allowed to be used for any general public purpose. Since 1991, these rooms have been exclusively used as exhibition or display rooms for the exhibits moved from the Vatican Museums.

== Exhibits ==
The museum has been arranged into two wings. The principal wing is the museum of all artistic and historic importance starting with the paintings of the history of the Papal States, portraits of Popes until date, memorabilia of the Papal Military Corps including the navy, documents related to ceremonial orders of Popes, the Papal household items, and various ceremonial regalia and religious vessels and insignia not in use.

The second wing is an annex wing on the ground floor where the papamobili are on display; these consist of decorated carriages, saddles, sedans, wagons and the first cars used by the Popes.

== See also ==
- Index of Vatican City-related articles
