= Boycott of Superstruct Entertainment festivals =

2025 boycott campaign

In 2025, a boycott campaign started against music festivals promoted by Superstruct Entertainment, owned by KKR private equity conglomerate since 2024. The campaign is motivated by KKR's economic interests in Israel that campaigners characterize as complicity in the Gaza genocide. Several artists canceled their performances at festivals such as Field Day in the United Kingdom or Sónar in Spain.

The boycott in Spain has received support from the Ministry of Culture and the left political parties Sumar, United Left, Podemos and Republican Left of Catalonia.

== Background ==
Since 2017, Superstruct Entertainment has built up a large portfolio of music festivals, with more than 80 events worldwide, and a particularly strong presence in Europe. In June 2024, the Kohlberg Kravis Roberts (KKR) private-equity conglomerate announced the acquisition of Superstruct. KKR's investments in Israel-linked companies became central to the controversy: Axel Springer, a German publisher operating the Yad2 real estate platform that lists properties in occupied Palestinian territories; the cybersecurity firm Optiv, which has partnerships in Israel; or the Coastal GasLink pipeline.

== Timeline ==
=== Campaign emergence (August 2024–April 2025) ===
Soon after the acquisition was announced, in August 2024, a protest took place at the Flow Festival in Helsinki. The band Megabondmon used their performance to protest KKR's role in Gaza. In early 2025, a campaign emerged to boycott all Superstruct festivals until they changed ownership.

On 17 March 2025, Daytimers announced that they would not participate in any event promoted by Superstruct, withdrawing from Mighty Hoopla and Lost Village festivals. The South Asian collective called out KKR's involvement in "genocide" and encouraged other artists to follow their steps.

=== Escalation (May 2025–present) ===
In May 2025, 70 artists who previously performed at Sónar festival, signed an open letter vowing to not perform at the festival, and calling to support the Boycott, Divestment and Sanctions movement. The festival organization announced they would implement a procedure to get tickets refunded.

On 13 May 2025, the newspaper El Salto published a piece on KKR's takeover of Spanish festivals. The publication of this article has been credited as a pivotal moment for awareness in Spain.

On 17 May 2025, the Minister of Culture of Spain, Ernest Urtasun declared that KKR is "not welcome" in the country, and requested that KKR and other companies involved in the expansion of illegal Israeli settlements to be barred from participation in the European single market. Enrique Santiago, spokesperson of United Left demanded that the Government stops any authorizations of festivals owned by KKR in the country.

On 20 May 2025, the Rivas-Vaciamadrid city hall, governed by United Left, announced they would rescind the agreement with ShareMusic!, a Superstruct subsidiary, by which it used a public venue in the municipality for their festivals. Festivals already scheduled for June 2025 would proceed, but no further usage would be allowed.

On 21 May 2025, Olaya Suárez, spokesperson of Podemos in Gijón, demanded the end of any institutional funding of the Tsunami Xixón festival, owned by Superstruct.

In June 2025, in response to the cascading cancellations, Superstruct published a statement claiming that proceeds from festivals and events would remain within the company and would not go to KKR.

On 4 June 2025, the municipal groups of Republican Left of Catalonia (ERC) in L'Hospitalet de Llobregat and Barcelona called for an institutional boycott of Sónar 2025 over KKR ownership.

On 7 June 2025, in Amsterdam, 14 artists pulled out from the Milkshake lineup citing KKR investment. The artists announced this under the Ravers For Palestine Instagram account. They included Angelboy, Slimfit and DJ Shahmaran. In Valencia, a group of activists put up Palestine flags on a bridge over the Festival de les Arts venue, and artists like Zahara advocated for peace in Palestine during their performances.

== Cancelled performances ==
Approximately half of the Field Day festival lineup (19 out of 42 artists) cancelled their confirmed performances. The cancellations included Sisu Crew, Midland, Roza Terenzi, Spray, Regularfantasy and Mall Grab. As of 4 June 2025, more than 30 artists cancelled their performances at Sónar, including Arca, Rone and Juliana Huxtable. La Fúmiga canceled its performance at the Arenal Sound. La Élite pulled out from the Festival Internacional de Benicàssim (FIB). Gigatron and Crossed pulled out of the Resurrection Fest lineup. The drum and bass collective Fokin Massive cancelled their upcoming act at the Monegros Desert Festival. Residente cancelled performances at FIB and Morriña Fest.

The following artists have participated in the boycott:

1. ABADIR
2. Aines
3. AK97
4. Alice Sparkly Kat
5. Amantra
6. Ancient Pleasure
7. Andrea Belosi
8. angelboy
9. Animistic Beliefs
10. Arca
11. Axo Rock
12. Baba cy
13. Boikot
14. Brodinski
15. Cibelle
16. Colectivo Rock contra el fascismo
17. Colin Self
18. Crossed
19. Dakidarría
20. Dania
21. Daytimers
22. Desklate
23. Dis Fig
24. DJ Haram
25. DJ Paca
26. DJ Shahmaran
27. DJ Sosa RD
28. dublabBCN
29. El Niño de la Hipoteca
30. El Último Ke Zierre
31. Emma DJ
32. Ergo Pro
33. Esmeralda
34. Eyra
35. Fermín Muguruza
36. Flore
37. Florentino
38. Fokin Massive
39. Free City
40. Gigatron
41. Gritando en Silencio
42. Günseli Yalcinkaya
43. Heith
44. High Paw
45. Ikonika
46. Ill Pequeño
47. Jehia
48. Jeisson Drenth
49. Jokk0 Collective
50. Juliana Huxtable
51. Julietta Ferrari
52. Kaos Urbano
53. Kaótiko
54. Kalerizo
55. Kamikazes
56. Kebra
57. Kode9
58. La Élite
59. La Fúmiga
60. La Prados
61. Lanav
62. LaFrancesssa
63. Las Ninyas del Corro
64. Le Motel
65. Lechuga Zafiro
66. Loncha Velasco
67. Lolo & Sosaku
68. Los de Marras
69. La Raíz
70. Loraine James
71. Maquette Dieng
72. Magdalena Petrova
73. Mago Hart
74. Mall Grab
75. Manuka Honey
76. Mans O
77. Marikarmen Free
78. Nahoomie
79. nara is neus
80. Natalia Gima
81. Nicholas Evans (MTG-UPF)
82. Midland
83. Nina Emocional
84. No Konforme
85. Noela Covelo Velasco
86. Non Servium
87. Nexus (B4mba & Mooki6)
88. Nueen
89. Objekt
90. Oliver Torr
91. Om Unit
92. oma totem
93. Opo
94. Paquita Gordon
95. Peder Mannerfelt
96. Peter Kirn
97. Phran
98. Pink Socks
99. Porretas
100. Pura Cadera
101. Ratri Notosudirdjo
102. Regularfantasy
103. Reincidentes
104. Residente
105. R-010 & Venerandi
106. Rompiendo Filas
107. Rone
108. Roza Terenzi
109. Saint Abdullah
110. Sangre Salvaje
111. Sara Persico & Mika Oki
112. Sarna
113. Santiago Latorre
114. Selectya Glossy
115. Sergi Botella Llongueras
116. Shannen SP
117. Shaun J. Wright
118. Shapednoise & Sevi Iko Domochevsky
119. Sínkope
120. Sisu Crew
121. Ska-P
122. Slimfit
123. Sofia
124. Sons of Aguirre & Scila
125. Spray
126. Sunny Graves
127. Tiyumii
128. Tom Heyes
129. Vica Pacheco
130. Yessi Perse
