= Oded Shaham =

Israeli judge

- עודד שחם
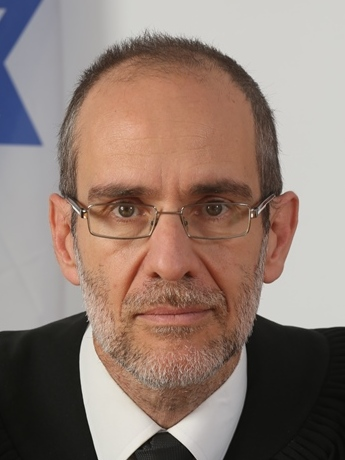
- Born: 1964
- Citizenship: Israel
- Education: Hebrew Reali School, The Hebrew University of Jerusalem
- Occupation: Judge
- Years active: 1993-present

Oded Shaham (Hebrew: עודד שחם; born 1964) is an Israeli jurist who serves as judge of the Jerusalem District Court since August 2012. He is one of the judges presiding over the trial of Israeli Prime Minister Benjamin Netanyahu, alongside Rivka Friedman-Feldman and Moshe Bar-Am.

== Biography ==
Shaham was born in 1964 and completed his high school education at the Hebrew Reali School in Haifa in 1982. From 1983 to 1986, he served in the Israel Defense Forces (IDF) in the Artillery Corps. After his military service, he pursued legal studies at the Hebrew University of Jerusalem, where he graduated. He interned with Meir Shamgar, President of the Supreme Court of Israel, and at a private law firm. In 1993, Shaham was admitted to the Israel Bar Association.

From 1993 to 1996, Shaham worked as an attorney in private job and later served as the legal assistant to Supreme Court of Israel jurist Theodore Or. He then joined the criminal division of the State Attorney's Office. Between 2001 and 2003, Shaham was part of the team that gathered materials for the State Commission of Inquiry into the events of October 2000. He later worked as a registrar at the Supreme Court.

In September 2004, Shaham became a judge at the Jerusalem Magistrate's Court. He was part of the panel that handled the case of former minister Tzachi Hanegbi. The judges disagreed on whether Hanegbi should also face defamation charges after being convicted of perjury. Shaham was part of the majority that took a stricter stance on this issue.

In August 2012, Shaham was appointed as a judge at the Jerusalem District Court. In February 2020, he was selected as one of the three judges overseeing the high-profile trial of Prime Minister Benjamin Netanyahu and co-defendants Arnon Mozes and Shaul Elovitch.

On 8 September 2024, lawyers representing Netanyahu petitioned the Jerusalem District Court for an injunction against journalist Raviv Drucker, one of the producers of a documentary film, for publishing footage from a police interrogation without the court's permission. Judge Oded Shaham denied the request on September 9, and the film was screened later that day.
