= Radio Lev HaMedina =

Israeli regional radio station

- Rishon LeZion; Israel
- Broadcast area: Shfela and central Israel
- Frequencies: 91.0 FM; 93.3 FM
- Branding: Lev HaMedina 91FM

Programming
- Language: Hebrew
- Format: Mizrahi music

Ownership
- Owner: Radius Broadcasting (David Ben Basat)
- Sister stations: Radios 100FM; Pervoye Radio 89.1FM; Radios Nostalgia 96.3FM

History
- First air date: 1997

Technical information
- Licensing authority: Second Authority for Television and Radio

Links
- Website: www.91fm.co.il

Radio Lev HaMedina (Hebrew: רדיו לב המדינה, lit. 'Heart of the Nation Radio'), branded on air as 91FM, is an Israeli regional radio station broadcasting Mizrahi music on 91.0 FM in central Israel and 93.3 FM in the Shfela. It has broadcast from Rishon LeZion since 1997 under a regional licence from the Second Authority for Television and Radio. The station is owned by the Radius broadcasting group, controlled by David Ben Basat.

== History ==
The station began broadcasting in 1997, after the regional radio franchise for the Shfela region was awarded in a 1996 tender. In 2001 the station received approval from the Second Authority to split its frequencies, which led to the establishment of the Russian-language station Pervoye Radio 89.1FM. Businessman Shaul Elovitch acquired control of the station ahead of the 2008 licence renewal. Gadi Sokenik, a media figure who had chaired the station's board since 2008, announced his resignation from the position in June 2010. In September 2010 Elovitch sold his stake in Lev HaMedina and its sister station Radios 100FM to his partner, station owner David Ben Basat, following Elovitch's acquisition of the Bezeq telecommunications group, which required him to divest other media holdings.

== Programming ==
Lev HaMedina broadcasts Mizrahi and Mediterranean Israeli music around the clock, alongside talk segments on subjects such as relationships and current affairs. It is part of the Radius group, which also operates Radios 100FM, Pervoye Radio 89.1FM and Radios Nostalgia 96.3FM. Presenters associated with the station have included singer Margalit Tzan'ani, as well as Gideon Lev-Ari and Shosh Atari, both formerly of Kol Yisrael.
