= Internet Gold Golden Lines =

Principal communication service group in Israel

Internet Gold Golden Lines Ltd.
- Type: Public
- Traded as: Nasdaq: IGLD
- Industry: communication services
- Founded: 1992; 34 years ago
- Headquarters: Israel
- Area served: Israel
- Revenue: $2.49 billion (As of 2013)
- Website: igld.com

Internet Gold Golden Lines Ltd. (Internet Gold) is a principal communication service group in Israel. The company was founded in 1992 and is headquartered in Israel. It is a subsidiary of Eurocom Communications Ltd., owned by Shaul Elovitch. It has subsidiaries such as B Communications (formerly 012 Smile Communications) and GoldMind Ltd. (formerly Smile.Media Ltd.). The company was formerly known as Euronet Golden Lines Ltd. and changed its name to Internet Gold - Golden Lines Ltd. in 1999.

== Background ==
The company operates in four areas including Bezeq Domestic Fixed-line Communications, Pelephone Communications ltd., Bezeq International Ltd. And D.B.S. Satellite Service Ltd.

As of 4 April 2013, the company has a market capitalization of $789.67 million with an enterprise value of $3.79 billion.

The company’s subsidiary, B Communications, is the controlling holder, holding 31.37% interest, of Bezeq, which is the largest communication service provider in Israel. The company owns 75.3% interest of its subsidiary, 012 Smile Communications Ltd, which is one of Israel’s major Internet and international telephony service providers and the largest providers of enterprise/IT integration services. In 2010, 012 Smile Communication completed the acquisition of all shares of Golden Lines Ltd. Smile Media Ltd. is 100% owned by Internet Gold and is engaged in Internet portals and e-Commerce business.
