= Actcom =

- Company type: Private
- Industry: Internet service provider
- Founded: 1992; 33 years ago in Haifa, Israel
- Founders: Amir Plivatsky; Ayelet Holder
- Fate: Acquired on 2007 by Bezeq International
- Headquarters: Haifa, Israel,
- Area served: Israel
- Key people: Amir Plivatsky (founder); Ayelet Holder (founder)

ACTCOM (Active Communications Ltd.) was the first Israeli Internet service provider (ISP). The company was founded in 1992 by Amir Plivatsky and Ayelet Holder. In 2007 the company was acquired by Bezeq International.

== History ==
The firm was established in 1992 by Amir Plivatsky and Ayelet Holder. Actcom was the first such companies in Israel and one of the first in the world. It began providing access to the business sector. Among its customer were leading Israeli hi-tech companies.

In 1995, Actcom started to provide consumer Internet access.

The company provided other communication services including web hosting and intranets to corporations and other organizations.

Actcom supported open source and free software and the Israel open-source community.

After 15 years of activity the company was purchased by Bezeq International in 2007. During the period the company was located in Haifa.

== See also ==
- "Israeli Internet Service Provider - Actcom". www.neystadt.org. Archived from the original on 2015-09-09.
- "ActCom.co.il - AboutUs". aboutus.com.
- Doron, Gideon; Lev-On, Azi, eds. (11 June 2014). New Media, Politics and Society in Israel. Routledge. ISBN 978-1-317-97787-2.
