= Nissan Tzur =

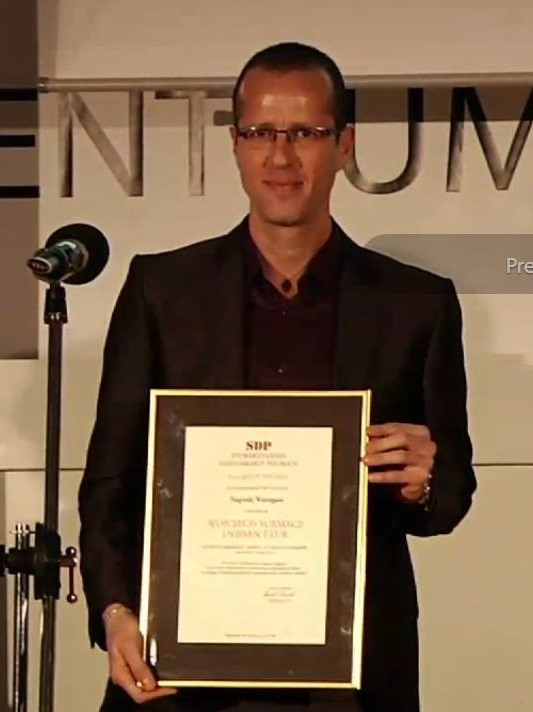
Tzur, 2017

Nissan Tzur (Hebrew: ניסן צור; born January 15, 1973) is an Israeli Journalist, correspondent for Eastern Europe, living in Poland. He is the recipient of the "Watergate Prize for investigative Journalism" of the Polish Journalist's Union (SDP) in 2013 for his article. He is the owner of the "Nissnews" website which focuses on Jewish and Israeli related news, including exclusive stories and investigative article. He is currently writing for the Israeli daily Maariv, Arutz 7, Davar Rishon, Walla News! and Makor Rishon.

== Biography ==
Tzur was born in Kfar Saba, Israel. He graduated "Journalism and Media" studies (1995) and the Habetzefer College of Media, Copywriting, Advertising and Public Relations (2005). He started his journalism career writing for Arim weekly magazine in Israel (1994). In 2005 he moved to Poland and from 2007 serves as a foreign correspondent for the Israeli daily Maariv and for Arutz 7 news website for Europe. He also reported for the Jewish Chronicle (2006-2016), for the Polish National Radio - Hebrew section (2007–2012) and for NRG website (2010–2017).

In 2013 Tzur was the recipient of the "Watergate Prize for investigative Journalism" of the Polish Journalist's Union (SDP) for the article "Kaddish for a million bucks" (together with the Polish journalist Wojciech Surmacz).

Tzur is also a lecturer in the Department of Communication and Media Studies in a few universities in Poland.

He is the owner of "Nissnews" website, which focuses on Jewish and Israeli related news, including exclusive stories and investigative articles.
