= Rivka Friedman-Feldman =

Israeli judge

- רבקה פרידמן-פלדמן
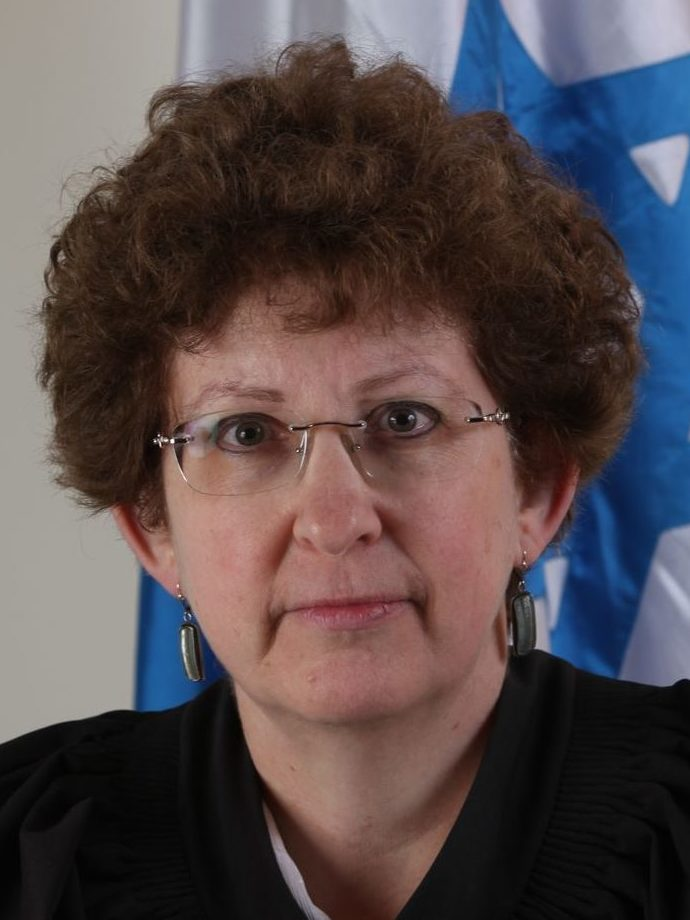
- Born: 1958 (age 67–68); Jerusalem, Israel
- Citizenship: Israel
- Education: Hebrew University of Jerusalem
- Occupations: Judge, Deputy President of the Jerusalem District Court
- Years active: 1982-present
- Organization: Judiciary of Israel
- Known for: Money envelopes affair, Trial of Benjamin Netanyahu

Rivka Friedman-Feldman (Hebrew: רבקה פרידמן-פלדמן; born 1958) is an Israeli judge and the Vice President of the Jerusalem District Court. She served on the judicial panel in the trial of Prime Minister Ehud Olmert, commonly known as the money envelopes affair, as well as in the trial of former Defense and Transportation Minister Yitzhak Mordechai.

Since May 2020, Friedman-Feldman serves as the presiding judge in the Trial of Benjamin Netanyahu, together with jurists Moshe Bar-Am and Oded Shaham.

== Biography ==
Friedman-Feldman was born in Israel to Noah Savir, a lawyer and the son of Rabbi Moshe Leib Zinwirt. She graduated from the Horev School in Jerusalem in 1976 and completed Sherut Leumi (Israel's national service)

== Career ==
In 1981, Friedman-Feldman earned her law degree from the Hebrew University of Jerusalem.

Friedman-Feldman served as Director of the Civil Appeals Section (מדור ערעורים אזרחיים) of the Supreme Court of Israel from 1984 to 1987, and continued her legal career at the Israeli State Attorney office from 1987 to 1994.

=== HaShalom Jerusalem Magistrate Court ===
In September 1994, Friedman-Feldman was appointed as a judge at the HaShalom Jerusalem Magistrate Court. She served as vice president of the court from 2004 to 2012.

In 2001, she sat on the panel that tried former Defense Minister Itzik Mordechai for sexual harassment.

=== Jerusalem District Court ===
Friedman-Feldman was appointed to the Jerusalem District Court in January 2012.

On 30 March 2015, Friedman-Feldman convicted former prime minister Ehud Olmert in the money envelopes affair. She later handled several high-profile cases, among them the Kidnapping and murder of Mohammed Abu Khdeir and the Murder of Noa Eyal.

In May 2020, Friedman-Feldman was appointed lead judge in the Trial of Benjamin Netanyahu at the Jerusalem District Court, alongside jurists Moshe Bar-Am and Oded Shaham.

On 18 July 2024, she was appointed Deputy President of the Jerusalem District Court and is expected to serve in this role until her retirement from the judiciary on March 7, 2028.
