= 100.0 FM =

FM radio frequency

The following radio stations broadcast on 100.0 MHz.

== Belgium ==
- Nostalgie Wallonie in Brussels

== China ==
- CNR The Voice of China in Dingxi, Jincheng and Suzhou (Jiangsu)
- Huizhou News Radio Sunshine 100 in Huizhou
- CNR Business Radio in Chongqing
- CRI Easy FM in Lhasa

== Indonesia ==
- Suara Surabaya in Surabaya

== Israel ==
- Radios 100FM in Gush Dan and the Sharon plain

== Turkey ==
- Power FM in Istanbul, Ankara, İzmir, Bursa, Denizli and Antalya
- Radyo 3 in Hatay

== United Kingdom ==
- Hits Radio London in London
- Heart Scotland in Vale of Leven
- Classic FM (UK) in Devon
