= Radios 100FM =

Israeli regional radio station

- Rosh HaAyin; Israel
- Broadcast area: Sharon region and Gush Dan
- Frequencies: 96.3 MHz; 100.0 MHz

Programming
- Language: Hebrew
- Format: Contemporary hit radio (Israeli and international pop)

Ownership
- Owner: Radius Broadcasting (David Ben Basat, Shaul Elovitch)
- Sister stations: Radio Lev HaMedina; Pervoye Radio 89.1FM; Radios Nostalgia 96.3FM

History
- First air date: 1995

Technical information
- Licensing authority: Second Authority for Television and Radio

Links
- Website: www.100fm.co.il

Radios 100FM (Hebrew: רדיוס 100FM, also Radius 100FM) is an Israeli regional radio station broadcasting on 100.0 FM in the Sharon region and the Tel Aviv metropolitan area. Established in 1995 under a regional broadcasting licence from the Second Authority for Television and Radio, it broadcasts Israeli and international popular music 24 hours a day from studios in Rosh HaAyin. The station is the flagship of the Radius broadcasting group, which is owned by David Ben Basat.

== History ==
The station was established in 1995 after businessman David Ben Basat proposed to fellow media executive Shaul Elovitch that they jointly bid for a regional radio franchise covering the Sharon area. Elovitch, through his Eurocom Group, financed the venture, and Ben Basat, already a well known figure in the Sharon region, became the station's chief executive. Operating on a modest budget, Ben Basat built a schedule centred on music, supplemented by a handful of current affairs programmes, including a flagship Friday morning show, HaNivcharim ("The Chosen"), which he hosted himself and which featured interviews with elected officials.

The station's frequency, 100 FM, had previously carried the unlicensed offshore broadcasts of Kol HaShalom ("Voice of Peace"), the pirate station founded by peace activist Abie Nathan. On 29 April 2007, to mark what would have been Nathan's 80th birthday, Radios 100FM devoted a full day of programming to a recreation of the original Voice of Peace broadcasts, presented by several of that station's original announcers.

In March 2008, after the station's original licence expired, the Second Authority renewed the Sharon-region franchise with the Radius group, at that time owned by Eurocom (Elovitch, 85 percent) with CEO David Ben Basat holding the remaining 15 percent. The Radius bid received the highest score, 81 out of 100, among three competing bids assessed by the regulator's legal, financial and content advisers; a rival consortium headed by Uri Sha'ar and managed by former Channel 2 News chief executive Shalom Kital placed second with a score of 78.8. Before the decision was ratified, the losing consortium petitioned the Jerusalem Administrative Affairs Court to block the Second Authority's council from convening, arguing that one of the regulator's content advisers, Naftali Ben Simon, had a conflict of interest; the court declined to halt the proceedings and gave the Second Authority five days to respond to the petition.

In September 2010, following Elovitch's acquisition of the Bezeq telecommunications group, which required him to divest other media holdings, Elovitch sold his stake in Radios 100FM and its sister station Radio Lev HaMedina to his partner, David Ben Basat, who has since been the sole owner of the Radius group.

== Programming ==
Radios 100FM broadcasts contemporary Israeli and international hits around the clock, with dedicated blocks for older material earlier in the day and newer releases in the evening, plus weekend talk programming. Among its long running strands is the daily afternoon programme Manheret HaZman ("Time Tunnel"), hosted by broadcaster Yaron Eshbal and dedicated to older Hebrew and international songs. The station also operates a range of digital music channels and a video simulcast, Radios TV.

== Sister stations ==
The Radius group also operates:

- Radio Lev HaMedina 91FM, a Mizrahi music station broadcasting from Rishon LeZion since 1997.
- Pervoye Radio 89.1FM, Israel's first licensed Russian-language commercial station, broadcasting since 2001.
- Radios Nostalgia 96.3FM, a commercial-free, 24-hour oldies station playing Hebrew and international songs mostly from the 1960s to the 1980s. A 2024 Ynet review described owner David Ben Basat, an enthusiast of Hebrew music, as occasionally slipping his own recordings into the station's playlist.
