= Moshe Bar-Am =

- משה בר-עם
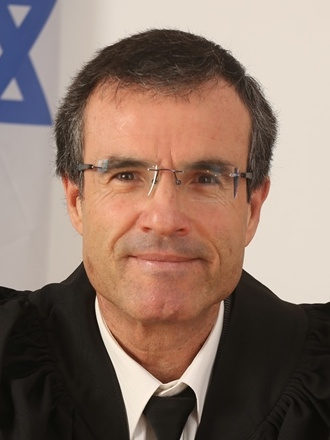
- Born: 1960 (age 65–66)
- Citizenship: Israel
- Education: Hebrew University of Jerusalem, University of Haifa, Clark University
- Years active: 1991-present
- Organization: Judiciary of Israel
- Known for: Bibitors affair, Trial of Benjamin Netanyahu

Moshe Bar-Am (Hebrew: משה בר-עם; born 1960) is an Israeli jurist who serves as a judge on the Jerusalem District Court since August 2012. He is one of the judges presiding over the trial of Benjamin Netanyahu, alongside Judges Rivka Friedman-Feldman and Oded Shaham.

== Biography ==
Bar-Am was born in Jerusalem, Israel in 1960 under the name Moshe Ben-Hamo. He completed his secondary education in 1978 at Denmark High School, located at Katamon, Jerusalem. Following high school, he enlisted in the Israel Defense Forces (IDF), serving as an officer until 1982.

=== Education ===
In 1990, Bar-Am earned a Bachelor of Laws (LL.B.) degree from the Hebrew University of Jerusalem, and was admitted to the Israel Bar Association in November 1991. In 2006, he earned a Master of Laws (LL.M.) degree with honors at the University of Haifa.

== Career ==
From 1991 to 1994, Bar-Am worked as an attorney. He then became an independent lawyer from 1994 to 1998. During this time, he pursued studies in public administration at Clark University in Worcester, Massachusetts, United States.

In August 1998, Bar-Am was appointed registrar of the Beersheba Magistrate Court. Two years later, in August 2000, he was appointed as a judge on the Israeli Southern District Magistrate Court.

=== Jerusalem District Court ===
In August 2012, Bar-Am became a judge at the Jerusalem District Court. Although he dealt with relatively few corruption and economic cases, he was considered an expert in serious criminal matters. One of the most notable cases he presided over was the trial of Daniel Nachmani, who was convicted of the murder of Noa Eyal 21 years after the crime occurred. Bar-Am also presided over the Bibitors affair (פרשת ביביטורס) involving Netanyahu lawsuit against Israeli journalist Raviv Drucker.

In May 2020, Bar-Am was appointed as a judge at the Trial of Benjamin Netanyahu at the Jerusalem District Court, alongside jurists Rivka Friedman-Feldman and Oded Shaham.
