= B144 =

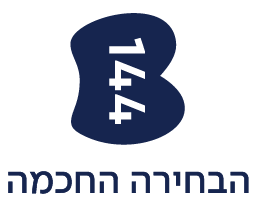
- Industry: Phone and business directory
- Founded: 2000
- Headquarters: Israel
- Parent: Bezeq
- Website: B144

Bezeq's B144 services include an online business guide (b144.co.il), the 144 call center and a mobile app. The service provides access to telephone numbers and addresses of any business or person in Israel. The website also includes map services, postal code search etc.

== 144 – The Call Center ==
During the first years of its existence, the service was established in the form of a call center, in which the operators were connecting calls to the required destinations. Later the service was upgraded to be able to provide required phone numbers manually, using cards. During the 1980s, the first computerized systems have been used to enable an automatic search for private and business phone numbers.

In the middle of the 1980s, the call center's number was changed from 14 to 144. In the 1990s a computer system was developed to deliver the required phone number in the form of a pre-recorded message, similar to the way it works today. At the same time the infrastructure of the call center was upgraded as well, making the operation of additional services possible, such as "a call completion service" that connects the customer to the demanded phone number.

The 144 call center service is available 24 hours a day, 7 days a week and every day of the year except Yom Kippur. The call center is a paid service, while the B144 website serves millions of customers free of charge.

== Technological Enhancements in the B144 Call Center and the Adoption of the Internet ==
Along with the worldwide adoption of the technological progress and more extensive use of the Internet and the cellular networks, it became clear that there is a need for an accessible web platform that will be able to provide its users with an immediate and free response. As a result, in the beginning of the 2000s Bezeq launches the online 144 directory. The website offered services similar to 144, free of charge, although still based on the previous technological solutions.

In February 2007 Bezeq announces the opening of the renewed 144 and 1344 call centers, both of them eventually united under the B144 brand. The most prominent feature of the united website was that for the first time it included phone numbers of all the cellular networks as well as of the domestic operator, allowing to retrieve both private and business contact information. At the same time, an additional service for business clients was launched – the B144 Business Guide.

== B144 and the Business Guide ==
The B144 Business Guide is a search engine and a database of Israeli companies which is maintained and updated by Bezeq on a daily basis, in accordance with the information received from the telecom companies. The Guide allows searching for businesses, persons, focus groups, governmental and non-governmental organizations, while the search results may be filtered by location, reviews rating, availability and more. Since 2009, the B144 service is also available in the form of a mobile application that was developed to enable a quick and intuitive search for businesses, people and maps. In 2011 Bezeq has added an advanced map system as one of the website's features. Since 2012, the B144 service uses Waze app as a navigation help tool: a feature that provides the users with arrival instructions to the required destination.

== B144 Digital ==
B144 Digital is Bezeq's B144 digital marketing agency which offers digital advertising for small and medium businesses in Israel.

== See also ==
- Bezeq
