= Trial of Benjamin Netanyahu =

Corruption trial of Israeli prime minister

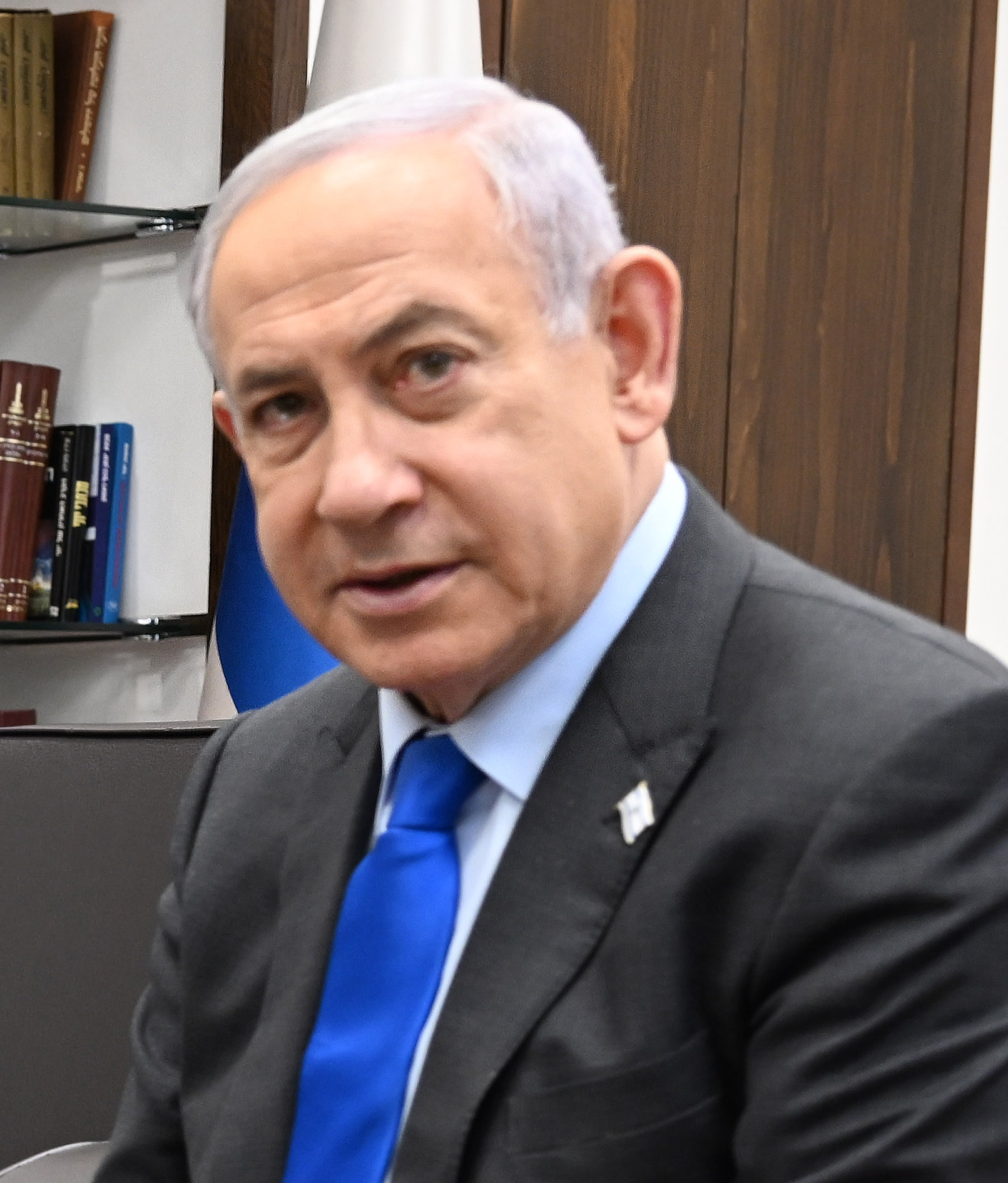
- Benjamin Netanyahu (pictured in 2023) has served three stints as Prime Minister of Israel: 1996–1999, 2009–2021, and 2022–present.
- Court: Jerusalem District Court and Supreme Court of Israel
- Decided: May 2020–present
- Verdict: Ongoing

Court membership
- Judges sitting: Rivka Friedman-Feldman, Moshe Bar-Am, Oded Shaham (Jerusalem District Court)

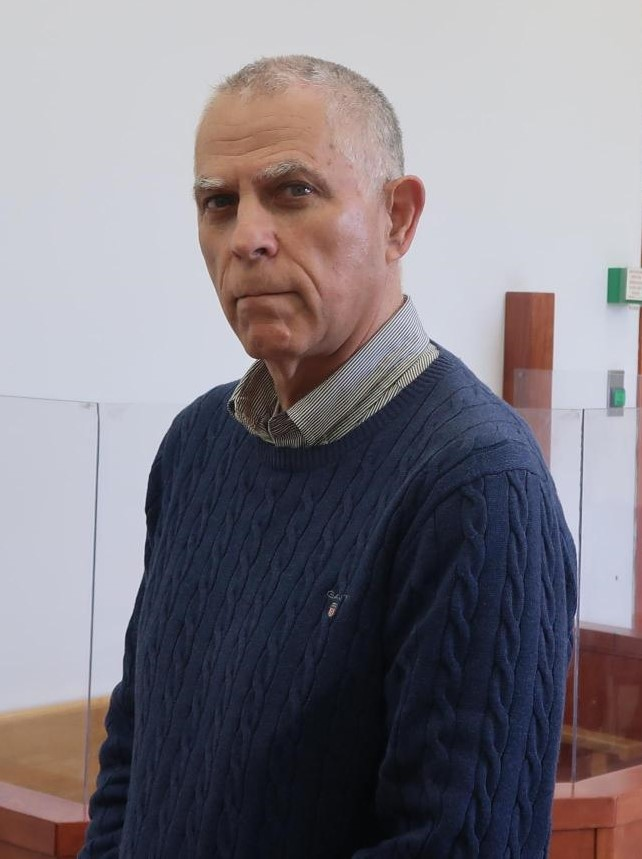
Arnon Mozes, accused of attempted bribery in Case 2000

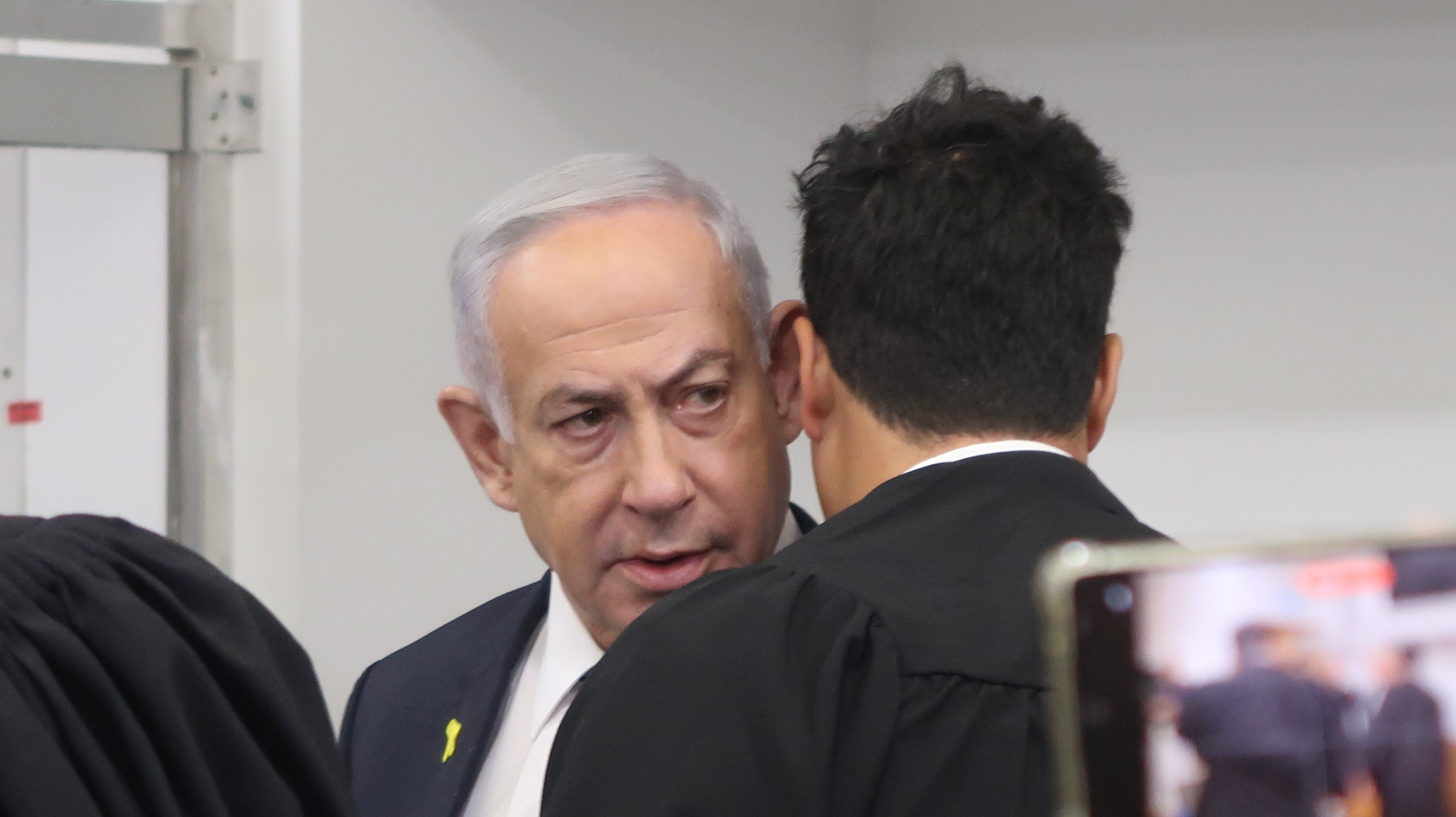
Benjamin Netanyahu in court during his corruption trial, prior to his third testimony day, seems to be talking with his attorney, Amit Hadad

The trial of Benjamin Netanyahu (Hebrew: משפט נתניהו, romanized: Mishpat Netanyahu), also known as the Netanyahu-Elovitch-Mozes Trial or the Publisher's Trial, began in 2020 following investigations into allegations of bribery, fraud, and breach of trust by Israeli prime minister Benjamin Netanyahu and his political allies during his fourth and fifth terms. The cases center on Netanyahu's relationships with Israeli businessman Arnon Milchan, Yedioth Ahronoth publisher Arnon Mozes, and Bezeq controlling shareholder Shaul Elovitch. Additional, similar cases investigated by police against Netanyahu and individuals related to him were not included in this particular trial.

The Israel Police began investigating Netanyahu in December 2016 and subsequently recommended indictments against him. The trial is led by a panel of three Jerusalem District Court judges Rivka Friedman-Feldman, Moshe Bar-Am, and Oded Shaham. Friedman-Feldman previously served on the judicial panel that convicted former prime minister Ehud Olmert of bribery, resulting in a six-year prison sentence.

On 21 November 2019, Netanyahu was officially indicted for breach of trust, accepting bribes, and fraud, leading him to legally relinquish his ministry portfolios other than prime minister. Netanyahu's trial in the Jerusalem District Court began on 24 May 2020, with witness testimony starting on 5 April 2021. The prosecution listed 333 witnesses. The prosecution rested in July 2024, and defense, starting with Netanyahu's testimony, began that December.

== Overview ==
Netanyahu was investigated in five different cases, three of which were brought to trial. Case 1000, opened in December 2016, involves valuable gifts and presents that Netanyahu and his wife received from two wealthy businessmen over the years. In Case 2000, recorded conversations between Netanyahu and Arnon Mozes, the chairman and editor of Yedioth Ahronoth, one of the largest newspapers in Israel, were discussed. They talked about the possibility of legislation that could harm Israel Hayom, Yedioth's major competitor. Case 4000 relates to the relationship between telecommunications company Bezeq and its regulator, the communication ministry, which was headed by Netanyahu at the time.

On 21 November 2019, Netanyahu was officially charged with fraud and breach of trust in Cases 1000 and 2000, and with fraud, breach of trust, and receiving bribes in Case 4000.

=== Case 1000 ===
In Case 1000, Netanyahu is accused of having a conflict of interest while he was the Minister of Communications and handled affairs related to Arnon Milchan's business interests. The prosecution alleges that Netanyahu received expensive cigars and champagne worth $195,000 from Milchan and James Packer, a friend of Milchan's, over a period of 20 years, as well as jewelry for Netanyahu's wife Sara worth $3,100. The charges cite three incidents in which Netanyahu allegedly assisted Milchan:

As per the allegations, in 2013, Prime Minister Netanyahu actively advocated for the extension of tax exemptions for returning residents, a measure that held significant financial advantages for Milchan. It is alleged that he engaged with officials from the Ministry of Finance on this matter. However, they opposed the initiative, citing its inconsistency with national interests, leading to the denial of the exemption extension.

As per the allegations, in the years 2013–2014, Netanyahu asked John Kerry on three occasions, to help Milchan in securing a US Visa.

As per the allegations, in 2015, Netanyahu instructed the director general of the Ministry of Communications, Shlomo Filber, to aid Milchan in regulatory matters. This directive was related to a merger deal between the communications companies Reshet and Keshet, with the aim of ensuring the profitability of an investment that Milchan was considering.

=== Case 2000 ===
Case 2000 (also known as the Netanyahu-Mozes affair) is a criminal investigation that concerns the relationship between Netanyahu and the publisher and controlling owner of Yedioth Ahronoth, Arnon Mozes. The investigation was conducted by the National Fraud Investigation Unit of the Israeli Police beginning in January 2017. As per the allegations, Mozes offered Netanyahu a significant change for the better in the way Netanyahu and his family members are covered in Yedioth Ahronoth, and a change for the worse in the way his political opponents are covered. In exchange Netanyahu should be using his influence to promote legislation that would impose restrictions on Israel Hayom and bring significant financial benefits to Mozes and his businesses.

In November 2019, Attorney General Avichai Mandelblit announced that he had decided to file an indictment against Netanyahu for fraud and breach of trust and against Mozes for attempted bribery. The trial began In May 2020.

=== Case 4000 ===
Case 4000 involves the communication conglomerate Bezeq. The investigation focused on allegations that Netanyahu had promised regulatory changes that would be favorable to the business interests of Shaul Elovitch, the owner of Bezeq, in exchange for positive coverage of Netanyahu and his family by Walla!, Elovitch's news website. Netanyahu was charged with fraud, breach of trust, and bribery in this case. Elovitch was also charged with bribery. The charges against Netanyahu include receiving bribes and acting in a conflict of interest as Minister of Communications. The Israeli police recommended bribery charges against Netanyahu in December 2018. On 21 November 2019, Israeli attorney general Avichai Mandelblit officially brought charges against Netanyahu and Elovitch.

During the 2023 Israeli judicial reform protests, Netanyahu announced his intention to remove Defense Minister Yoav Gallant from his post on 26 March 2023; Boaz Ben Zur, Netanyahu's lawyer in Case 4000, told Netanyahu he would quit if Netanyahu did not stop the proposed legislation.

=== Cases that did not go to trial ===
==== Case 1270 ====
Case 1270 related to a suspicion that Netanyahu's former media advisor offered District Court president Hila Gerstel an appointment to the vacated Attorney General of Israel, in exchange for closing a case against Netanyahu's wife, an offer Gerstel refused. The case has been compared to the "Bar-On Hebron affair" in 1997, during Netanyahu's first term, involving the appointment of Roni Bar-On to attorney general. In January 2019, the case was closed for lack of evidence.

==== Case 3000 ====
During the investigative phase, Netanyahu was dropped as a direct suspect in the case in which three Dolphin-class submarines and four Sa'ar 6-class corvette were purchased from the German company ThyssenKrupp by Israel. The suspicion in this case refers to swaying the deal in ThyssenKrup's favor for the personal gain of several of the people involved. Netanyahu's cousin and personal lawyer David Shimron, who represented the German company in Israel, is one of the main suspects.

A state commission that was formed to investigate the case, chaired by Asher Grunis, will hold hearings from November 2026 until December.

== Protests ==
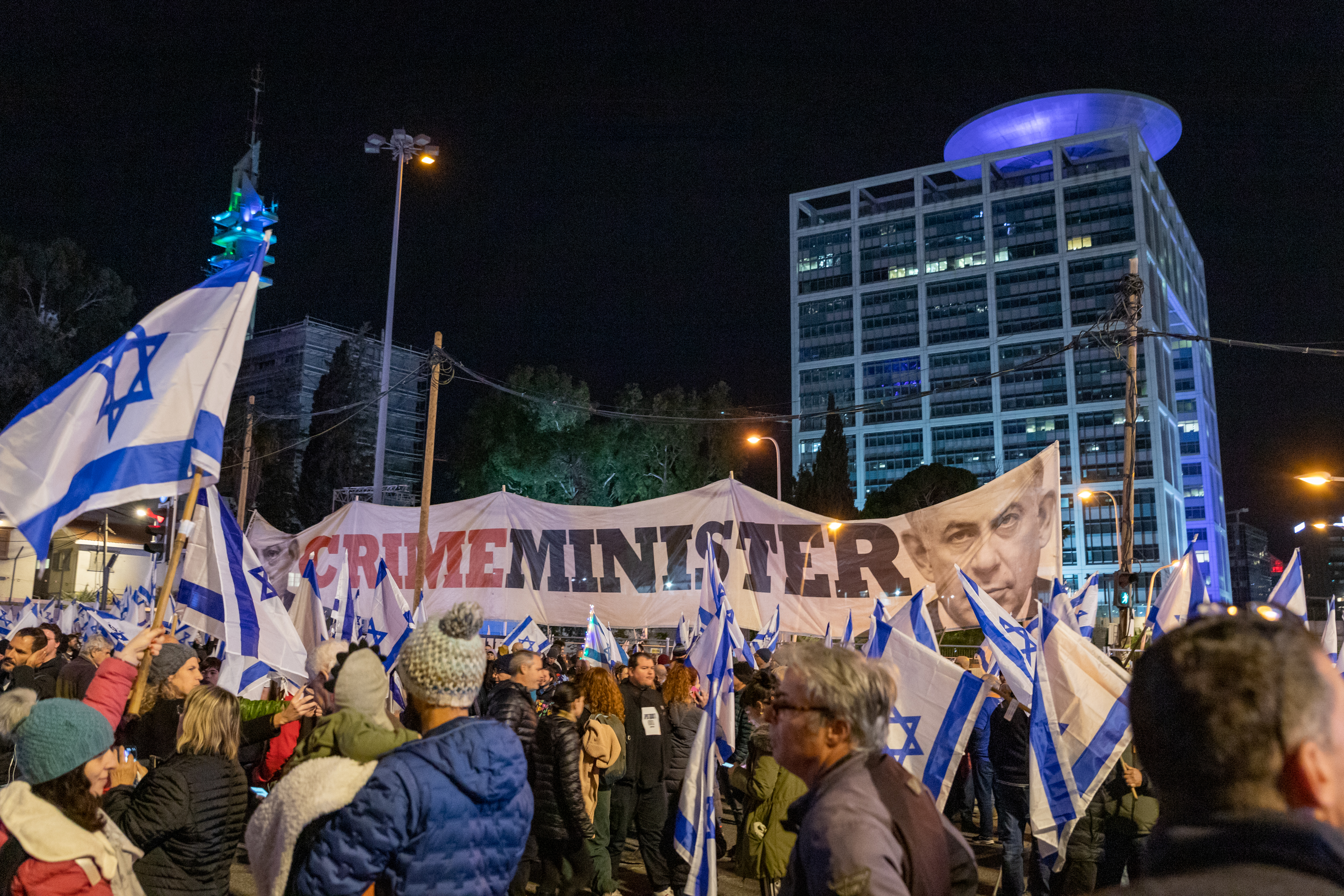
Protest against Netanyahu in Tel Aviv on 11 February 2023

In September 2017, protesters started holding weekly Sunday rallies in Petah Tikva for 41 consecutive weeks, protesting what they perceived as interference with the investigations and delays by Attorney General Avichai Mandelblit. In addition, rallies against government corruption were held in Tel Aviv's Rabin Square. As Netanyahu remained in power despite being formally charged, the protests grew substantially in 2020 and 2021. These protests would later be linked to the 2023 demonstrations that were sparked by a proposed judicial reform, and a number of protests that occurred after the onset of the 2023 Gaza war.

== Indictment ==
On 19 December 2018, Israeli State Prosecutor Shai Nitzan recommended to Israeli attorney general Avichai Mandelblit that Netanyahu be indicted. On 20 December 2018, Israeli Attorney General Avichai Mandelblit said he would "work quickly" on the case, but "not at the expense of quality decisions and professionalism".

On 28 February 2019, the Supreme Court of Israel rejected a motion filed by Netanyahu's Likud Party to stall the publication of the attorney general's recommendations. The same day, Mandelblit announced that he had accepted police recommendations to indict Netanyahu on three of the charges and that the indictment will officially go into effect following a hearing.

The hearing took place in October 2019, and on 21 November, Netanyahu was indicted in cases 1000, 2000, and 4000 for charges including breach of trust, accepting bribes, and fraud.

As a result of the indictment, Netanyahu was legally required to relinquish of his ministry portfolios other than prime minister.

=== Immunity bid ===
Netanyahu submitted a request for immunity to the parliamentary speaker, Yuli Edelstein, on 1 January 2020. Many MKs, including Avigdor Lieberman of Yisrael Beiteinu, Benny Gantz of Blue and White, and Stav Shaffir of the Green Party, criticized the request. Lieberman called for the Knesset to bring back committees that had been dissolved (and also indicated that his party would vote against a bid for immunity); without a Knesset committee, there would be no action on Netanyahu's immunity until after the March election. According to The Times of Israel columnist Raoul Wootliff, the election had in effect become a race to gain enough seats so that Netanyahu can successfully request immunity from over half of the MKs. Knesset legal advisor Eyal Yinon ruled on 12 January 2020 that there was no impediment to forming a Knesset committee that could prevent Netanyahu from receiving immunity. If his immunity bid was not accepted, his trial could begin. Such a committee was formed the next day. Consequently, Netanyahu withdrew his bid for immunity on 28 January 2020; the charges against him were thus officially confirmed and filed in Jerusalem District Court on the same day.

== Prelude ==
On 18 February 2020, the Justice Ministry announced that Netanyahu's trial would start in the Jerusalem District Court on 17 March 2020.

On 9 March 2020, Netanyahu filed a motion to delay the trial for 45 days. On 10 March, the court rejected this bid and affirmed the original trial date. However, on 15 March 2020, the beginning of the trial was pushed back until 24 May as a result of coronavirus-related restrictions. The Jerusalem District Court ordered Netanyahu to appear in person at the opening of his trial.

== Trial ==
The trial began on 24 May 2020, in the Jerusalem District Court, with judges Rivka Friedman-Feldman, Moshe Bar-Am, and Oded Shaham presiding, and Friedman-Feldman serving as the lead judge. The prosecution team is headed by Deputy State Attorney Liat Ben-Ari, along with Yonatan Tadmor, Deputy Chief of the Tel Aviv District State Attorney's Office Economic Crimes Division, and Yehudit Tirosh, Director of the Securities Department of the Israel Securities Authority. Netanyahu's defense team initially included Amit Hadad, the chief defense attorney, along with Noa Milstein, Avichai Yehosef, and Yair Leshem, with Micha Fettman also on the team. However, Fettman left the defense team after the first hearing and was replaced by Yossi Segev, and Boaz Ben-Tzur joined the team after the second hearing.

The trial had four preliminary hearings in 2020. At the first hearing, Netanyahu and three other defendants, Shaul Elovitch, Iris Elovitch, and Arnon Mozes, were present, and the judges read out the charges. Netanyahu was exempted from appearing at most subsequent hearings. On 5 April 2021, the trial moved into the phase of hearing witness testimonies. In early 2022, reports surfaced about negotiations for a possible plea bargain, but that did not materialize. In April 2023, the prosecution and defense reached an agreement to cut non-essential prosecution witnesses, so as to reduce the number of prosecution witnesses who testify to around 60; with this agreement, the phase of hearing prosecution witnesses is expected to end in the first half of 2024.

Three former confidants of Netanyahu were implicated in criminal charges, and agreed to serve as state witnesses as part of plea bargain agreements: Shlomo Filber, the former director of the Ministry of Communications, Nir Hefetz, a former advisor, and Ari Harow, Netanyahu's former chief of staff. Other key witnesses include Ilan Yeshua, former CEO of Walla! News, Hadas Klein, Milchan's personal assistant who was in charge of purchasing and supplying the alleged illegal gifts and Arnon Milchan himself. Milchan's testimony, which took place in late June and early July 2023, took place via video from Brighton, United Kingdom, as he was allowed to be absent from appearing in person due to alleged health concerns. Prior to Milchan's testimony, in a private meeting with the prosecution and the defense, the judges suggested that the bribery charges may be difficult to prove, and implored both sides to consider a plea bargain "for the sake of the country".

On 5 December 2023, trial judges agreed to reduce the number of court hearings to two days a week due to the security concerns related to the ongoing Gaza war. At the end of December 2023, it was decided that the number of days would increase to four in February 2024. In January they announced that there would be 3 days of discussions starting on the 22nd of that month.

The prosecution rested in July 2024. Netanyahu's testimony was scheduled to begin on 2 December, following a request from the defense to postpone his testimony so as to give him time to prepare. On 10 November, the defense filed another motion to postpone the testimony, by 10 additional weeks, until the end of February 2025; on 13 November, the court denied the motion and ruled that the testimony should start on 2 December as scheduled, although later partially accepted another request and agreed to begin the testimony on 10 December. A hearing scheduled for 17 December was canceled as well, as were two weeks of hearings during January, following Netanyahu's undergoing minor surgery. Netanyahu's cross examination began on 3 June 2025. Cross-examination continued in February 2026.

On 30 November 2025, Netanyahu formally asked president Isaac Herzog for a pardon regarding his trial. Herzog insisted upon receiving a legal opinion from the Ministry of Justice prior to making his own decision on the matter. On 24 March 2026, the opinion was submitted to Herzog's office to be reviewed by his legal advisor prior to a decision being made. It was submitted by Heritage Minister Amichai Eliyahu after Minister of Justice Yariv Levin recused himself due to his having served as a witness for the defense in the case.

The court has notified Netanyahu that his trial will resume on 11 April. Netanyahu requested a postponement of his testimony in court.

Netanyahu's cross-examination was completed in June 2026, though he is expected to be questioned by attorneys of his co-defendants. His testimony was complete on 24 June, following "98 hearings."

== Reactions ==
=== Domestic political reactions ===
Several Israeli political figures and public actors responded to the continuation of the trial of Benjamin Netanyahu. Opposition leader Yair Lapid has repeatedly argued that Netanyahu should step down from political life in connection with the legal proceedings. In response to discussions surrounding a potential pardon, Lapid stated that any such measure should only follow an admission of guilt and retirement from politics. National Security Minister Itamar Ben-Gvir, along with other coalition allies, publicly supported Netanyahu during the course of the legal proceedings. Members of his Likud party and cabinet figures attended court sessions in support of him, with some describing the trial as politically motivated. Opposition figure Benny Gantz warned that weakening judicial institutions could endanger Israel's democratic system and national stability, and called for preserving institutional checks and the rule of law.

=== Public and media reactions ===
Reporting by the Associated Press documented large-scale demonstrations in Israel against Benjamin Netanyahu, with protesters expressing opposition to his leadership, criticism of government policies, and demands for accountability amid his ongoing corruption trial.

=== United States ===
US President Donald Trump calls for Netanyahu to be pardoned in October 2025

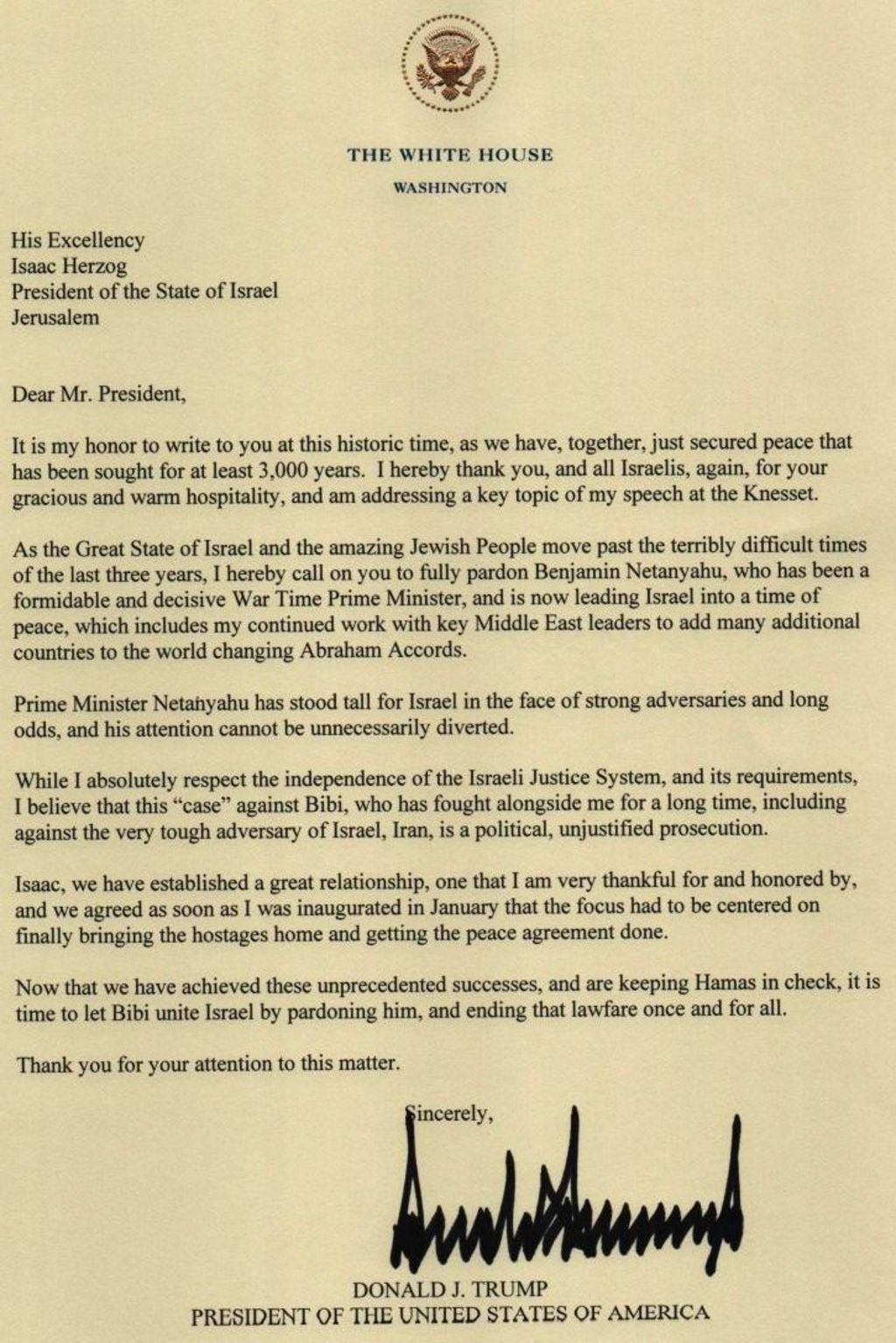
November 2025 letter from Donald Trump to Isaac Herzog

On 26 June 2025, United States President Donald Trump said Netanyahu's trial should be canceled, stating that "Bibi Netanyahu's trial should be CANCELLED, IMMEDIATELY, or a Pardon given to a Great Hero, who has done so much for the State" after the Twelve-Day War. On the following day, the Jerusalem District Court rejected Netanyahu's request to delay the trial testimony regardless of Trump's request, citing that the request "does not present a detailed basis or reason that might justify canceling evidentiary hearings". Trump repeatedly called on Israeli president Isaac Herzog to pardon Netanyahu, including during his address to the Knesset in October 2025, and wrote a letter to Herzog in November 2025 once again requesting a pardon for Netanyahu. In February 2026, Trump called Herzog "disgraceful for not giving it" and said "he should be ashamed of himself" and that "the people of Israel should really shame him", prompting Herzog's office and various Israeli politicians to push back, with Herzog's office stating "Israel is a sovereign state governed by the rule of law. Contrary to the impression created by President Trump's remarks, President Herzog has not yet made any decision on this matter".

== See also ==
- Corruption in Israel
