= ILTV =

Israeli English-language news and media company

ILTV News
- Industry: News media
- Founded: 2015
- Headquarters: Tel Aviv, Israel
- Key people: Tom Zadok (CEO)
- Products: English-language news, television programming, digital content and podcasts
- Owners: Reuven Moskowitz and Tom Zadok
- Website: Official website

ILTV, also known as ILTV News, is an Israeli English-language news and media company established in 2015. It produces news, current affairs and magazine programming about Israel for international audiences. Its content covers politics, security, business, technology, culture and lifestyle, and is distributed through television broadcasters, streaming services, its website and applications, and social media.

The company is owned by Reuven Moskowitz and Tom Zadok, who also serves as its chief executive officer.

== History ==
=== Establishment and development ===
ILTV began broadcasting online in December 2015. Media entrepreneur Ronen Lefler was involved in its early development, and its programming was produced by J Media Group.

In February 2017, ILTV announced a cooperation agreement with Israeli news company Walla!. Under the agreement, ILTV's programming would be produced and broadcast from Walla's Tel Aviv studios, and the companies would share content and footage.

That year, ILTV expanded distribution of its main newscast through Middle East Television. In June 2017, it was announced that its daily English-language newscast, Israel Daily, would be shown on El Al flights.

In 2019, the company was acquired by a group of American investors led by the Miami-based Falic family, which appointed Jacob Berg as its representative in Israel.

=== Ynet partnership ===
In July 2020, ILTV entered into a partnership with Ynet and moved its operations to Ynet's offices and studios. Its video programming was also distributed through Ynetnews. A report published in April 2021 described the company's production operations at the Ynet studios.

In April 2021, ILTV signed a two-year agreement with Canadian media company ZoomerMedia. The agreement included Canadian broadcast rights to Israel Daily for JoyTV and FaithTV, as well as access to ILTV's content library.

=== Streaming service and continuous channel ===
The company introduced ILTV+, a subscription streaming application. In a February 2022 announcement, ILTV described the service as offering news and original programming, including interviews, technology coverage, cooking and lifestyle content. The application was available for mobile devices and connected television platforms.

ILTV subsequently launched a continuous English-language channel. In its launch announcement, the company said the channel included newscasts, field reports, interviews, and culture, travel and lifestyle programming, with distribution through its application, YouTube and Screen iL.

=== Ownership change ===
In May 2026, technology entrepreneur Reuven Moskowitz and ILTV chief executive Tom Zadok acquired the company from Simon Falic and David Herzog in a management buyout. Zadok continued as chief executive.

Following the acquisition, the company announced plans to expand its culture, entertainment, music and podcast programming and to incorporate artificial intelligence tools into production and distribution.

=== Independent studio ===
In July 2026, ILTV left Ynet's studios and moved to an independent facility at 7 Nahal Ayalon Street in Tel Aviv. The company built a news studio at the site for newscasts, live broadcasts, news bulletins and podcasts.

== Programming ==
ILTV produces English-language news and programming about Israel and the Middle East. Alongside news and current affairs, its output covers business, technology, culture, tourism and lifestyle.

Its daily newscast, Israel Daily, has been distributed through international broadcasters, including ZoomerMedia's Canadian channels under the agreement announced in 2021. JLTV also lists ILTV's news program in its schedule.

Alongside full-length programs, the company publishes news clips, interviews and short videos online. Its subscription service offers an on-demand library, additional programming and early access to programs.

== Digital and social media ==
ILTV operates accounts on YouTube, Facebook, Instagram, TikTok, X and Telegram. It uses these platforms to distribute newscasts, news bulletins, interviews, field reports and short English-language videos.

The company offers free news clips on YouTube and social media alongside its subscription service.

According to company figures, ILTV's social media accounts had a combined total of more than 2.4 million followers and subscribers as of October 2026. This aggregate includes accounts across multiple platforms and does not necessarily represent unique users.

The company reports that its social media content received approximately 100 million organic views, without paid promotion, during the 12-day Israel–Iran war in June 2025. It describes this as one of its peak periods for viewership.

=== Content and distribution strategy ===
The company describes its approach as "social first", giving social media a central role in content planning and production. According to the company, this approach emphasizes timely, direct reporting, short-form video and presentation adapted to individual platforms, with the aim of encouraging sharing and organic distribution.

ILTV combines platform-specific digital content with full-length newscasts, magazine programs, podcasts and a continuous television channel. The company says this model is intended to serve audiences across television, computers and mobile devices, adapting the length and presentation of content to each platform.

== Broadcasting and distribution ==
ILTV distributes programming directly through its website, applications and social media, and through television broadcasters and streaming services.

=== Israel ===
On 1 September 2026, ILTV began broadcasting on Cellcom TV in Israel on channel 100. The channel is included in Cellcom's official channel listing.

The addition made ILTV's English-language channel available through Cellcom's television service alongside the company's direct digital distribution.

ILTV's main newscast was previously made available to viewers in Israel through Middle East Television under the distribution arrangement announced in 2017.

=== International distribution ===
Screen iL, a streaming service for viewers outside Israel, lists ILTV among its live television channels. JLTV also carries ILTV programming.

Historical distribution arrangements include the 2021–2023 agreement with ZoomerMedia for Canadian broadcasts of Israel Daily, and carriage of the newscast on El Al flights announced in 2017.

=== Direct streaming ===
ILTV's direct streaming service is available through its website and applications for mobile devices and television platforms, including Apple TV, Roku, Fire TV and Android TV. The service includes on-demand content, with additional programs and early access offered through a subscription.
