= Sónar =

Arts, design, and music festival in Spain

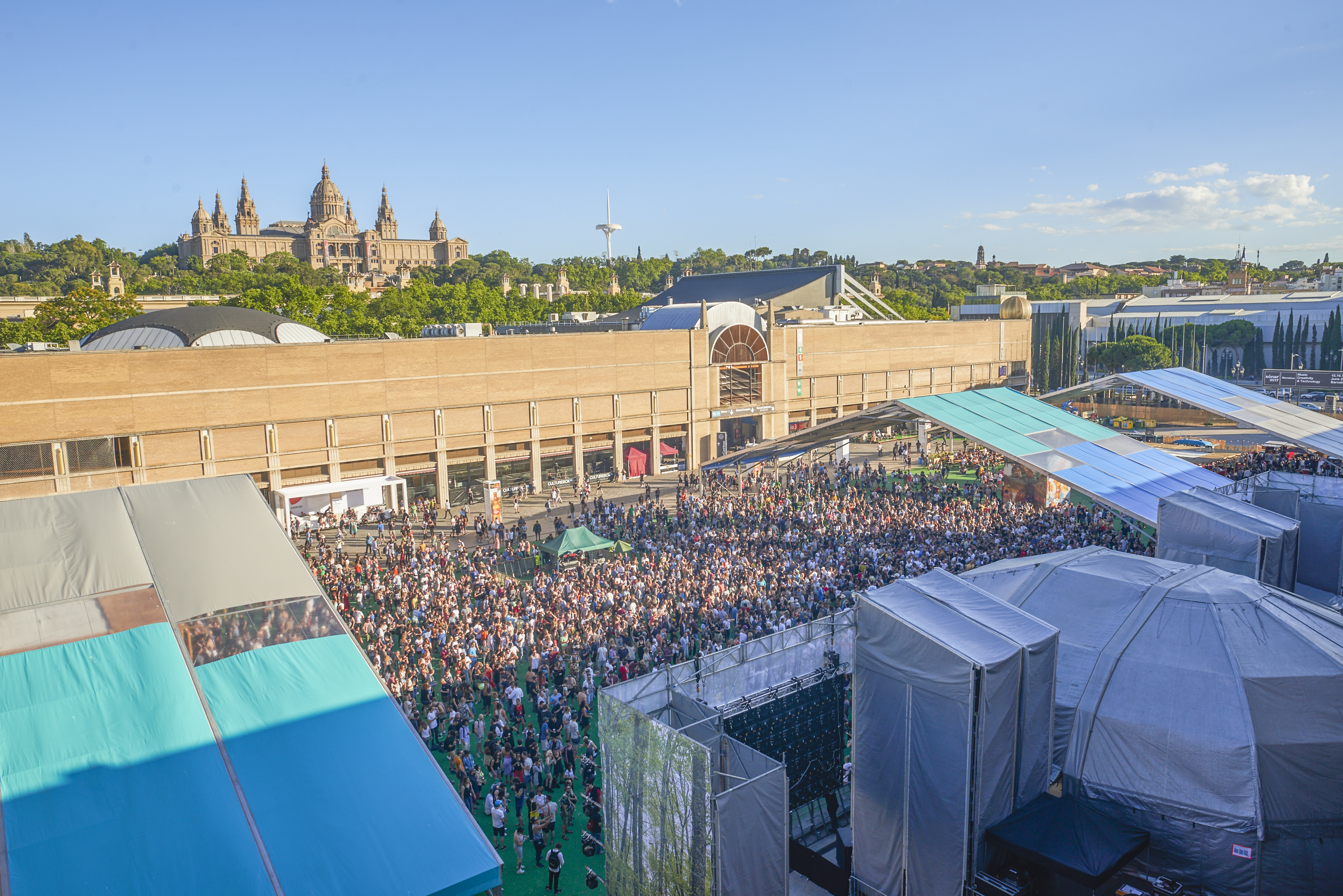
- Dates: 12, 13, & 14 June 2025
- Locations: Barcelona, Spain
- Years active: 1994 – present
- Founders: Advanced Music S. L.
- Website: sonar.es/en

Sónar is a festival dedicated to music, creativity and technology, founded in Barcelona in 1994 by Ricard Robles, Enric Palau, and Sergi Caballero. The festival has been divided into two parts since its inception: Sónar by Day and Sónar by Night, with a three-day congress, Sónar+D dedicated to Creativity, Technology and Business running concurrently since 2013. As well as the flagship event in Barcelona, Sónar hosts events around the world, with annual festivals having taken place in Bogota, Buenos Aires, Hong Kong and Reykjavik. On the 27th October 2026 Sonar Festival Official Account on their Instagram page added a single post stating "Sonar is dead". The official Sonar webpage also confirm this statement indicating the Sonar music festival will no longer be in existence.

In 2023, the 30th anniversary of the festival was held in Barcelona, along with Sónar festivals in Lisbon (for the 2nd time) and Istanbul (7th time).

Artists that have performed at Sónar include Björk, Thom Yorke, Jean-Michel Jarre, Duran Duran, Grace Jones, Beastie Boys, De La Soul, Kraftwerk, Gorillaz, New Order, Skrillex, Diplo, M.I.A., Arca, Rosalía, Yo La Tengo, Chic, Ryuichi Sakamoto, Aphex Twin, Richie Hawtin and Laurent Garnier.

Writing in 2017, the New York Times stated: “Sónar has built itself into a European institution... It’s a festival of the experimental and the crowd-pleasing, the subtle and the unsubtle, scaled from quiet small-auditorium performances to seismic stadium dance music....”

== Birth and early years (1994–1996) ==
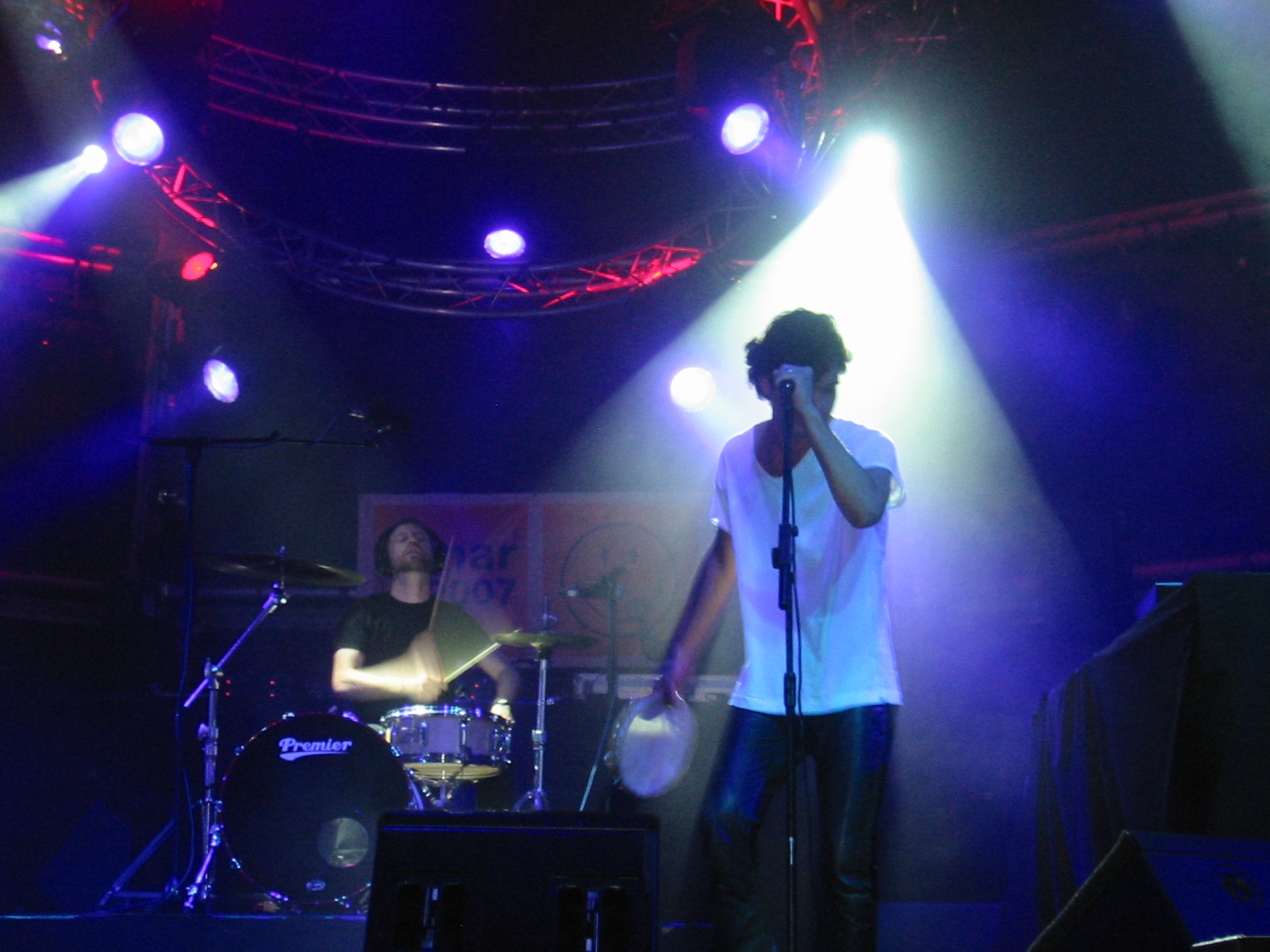

Sónar was founded in Barcelona in 1994 as the “Festival of Advanced Music and Multimedia Art”, by music journalist Ricard Robles and musicians and visual artists Enric Palau and Sergio Caballero. The first festival took place on 2, 3 and 4 June at the Centre de Cultura Contemporània de Barcelona (Sónar by Day) and the Apolo club (Sónar by Night), with performances by Holger Czukay, Mixmaster Morris, Laurent Garnier, Sven Väth, Atom Heart, and Trans Global Underground, among others. This first event, which included the Record Fair and Technology Fair - the forerunner of what is now known as Sonar+D - was attended by nearly 6,000 people and 40 representatives of the Spanish media.

Over the next two years, the festival expanded considerably: the number of accreditation holders doubled in 1995 and tripled in 1996, and the number of visitors rose from 6,000 to over 12,000 in 1995 and 18,000 in 1996. Sónar by Night relocated in its second year, moving to various areas in the Poble Espanyol, where it was based in 1995 and 1996. Some of performances and sessions during these years included Coldcut, Spring Heel Jack, Josh Wink, Autechre, Richie Hawtin, Ken Ishii, Slam, Jeff Mills, Scanner, Orbital, Fangoria, John Acquaviva, Kenny Larkin, and Biosphere.

== Evolution and growth (1997–2000) ==
The year 1997 marked a turning point for the festival, as Sónar by Night moved to a new venue, the Mar Bella sports pavilion, tripling its capacity. With the late 1990s came considerable growth: from 18,000 visitors in 1996 to 28,000 in 1997, 38,000 in 1998, 43,000 in 1999 and over 53,000 in 2000. The festival's evolution can also be measured in the number of accredited media: in 1996 there were 72 Spanish and 15 international media, by 2000 the number had risen to 158 and 185, respectively.

Artists performing at Sónar by Day during these four years included Squarepusher, Fennesz, Bruce Gilbert, Patrick Pulsinger, Pan Sonic, Mouse On Mars, Suicide, Aviador Dro, DJ Spooky, Pole, DJ Zero, Goldfrapp, and Merzbow, Daft Punk, Kraftwerk, Kruder & Dorfmeister, Jimi Tenor, Laurent Garnier (under his real name or the alias DJ Jamon), Marc Almond, Deep Dish, Motorbass, Plastikman, Herbert, Death In Vegas, Fila Brazillia, Roger Sánchez, Coldcut, DJ Hell, Sólo Los Solo, Atari Teenage Riot, An Der Beat, Chicks On Speed, Super Collider, and Miss Kittin.

== Sónar in the twenty-first century (2000–present) ==
In the early years of the new decade, Sónar continued to grow, first stabilizing at around 80,000 visitors each year and then growing further to 121,000 for its 20th anniversary in 2013. This attendance record was beaten again in 2017 (123,000) and at the 25th anniversary celebration in 2018 (126,000). In this period Sónar continued to exert an influence on critics and artists alike, thanks to its forward thinking programming and production. As the Financial Times reported in a 2006 review: "[The Scissor Sisters' Jake Shears] was not alone among artists in citing Sónar as a fundamental influence upon his career"

The 2001 festival saw another change of venue for Sónar by Night to the larger venue of the Fira Gran Via area in L'Hospitalet de Llobregat. This new home meant that it was possible to offer large format concerts with a strong audiovisual component, attracting performances by artists such as Björk (2002), Kraftwerk (with a 3D show in 2013) and The Chemical Brothers (2005 and 2015)

The Sónar by Night Venue hosts several stages; the 15,000 capacity SonarClub, the open air SonarLab and SonarPub and SonarCar. In 2016 this stage received an upgrade, featuring a custom sound system and a new format featuring continuous 7hr sets by selected DJ's. The inaugural edition featured Laurent Garnier (who assisted in the format's development) and Four Tet.

Sónar by Day also consolidated its extensive range, which is based not only on music but also the exhibitions at SonarMàtica, the activities at SonarPro, the screenings at SonarCinema, and the installations at Sonarama. During these years, the festival also collaborated with various institutions, spaces, and centres such as the GREC festival, the Centre d’Arts Santa Mónica, the Mies van der Rohe Foundation, CosmoCaixa, and L'Auditori, the venue for concerts by the Barcelona Symphony and Catalonia National Orchestra with Ryuichi Sakamoto + Pan Sonic + Fennesz, Francesco Tristano + Murcof, Matthew Herbert Big Band, and DJ /rupture, among many others.

In 2013, Sónar by Day, moved out of its previous home in MACBA to a larger space in the Fira Montjuïc facilities at Plaza d'Espanya. The music program at Sónar by Day takes place over 5 stages: SonarHall, SonarDome (presented by Red Bull Music), the SonarComplex auditorium, SonarXS (dedicated to urban sounds from the global streets) and the outdoor stage SonarVillage by Estrella Damm with its trademark artificial grass. In 2018, Sónar added an additional stage Sonar360º by Mediapro, dedicated to full dome experiences.

Notable artists performing in this period include M.I.A., De La Soul, Linton Kwesi Johnson, The Roots, Justice, Hot Chip, Janelle Monáe, Leila, Madlib, Prefuse 73, Ricardo Villalobos, Kode9, Plaid, The Sugarhill Gang, Flying Lotus, Björk (2002), Beastie Boys (2007), LCD Soundsystem (2010), Chic (2006), Pet Shop Boys (2002), Masters at Work(2001), Grace Jones (2009), the Chemical Brothers (2005 and 2015), Kraftwerk, Jurassic 5, Richie Hawtin, Skrillex, Paul Kalkbrenner, Major Lazer, Jamie Lidell, Chromatics, Diplo, Baauer, Nicolas Jaar, Liars, Lindstrøm & Todd Terje, Adrian Sherwood & Pinch, Seth Troxler, Gold Panda, Autechre, FKA Twigs, A$AP Rocky, Jean-Michel Jarre, New Order, and Anohni.

In 2019, Sónar shifted the date of its Barcelona edition from June to July and increased its focus on acts from the Latin, urban, trap and reggaeton music genres.

In the 2020s, Brazilian artists gained more visibility at Sónar, including acts such as Linn da Quebrada, Badsista, and Slim Soledad, who brought baile funk and hybrid club sounds to the festival.

In 2025, Sónar Festival in Barcelona faced a significant wave of cancellations after it was revealed that its parent company, Superstruct Entertainment, had been acquired in 2024 by a consortium led by U.S. investment firm KKR. Activists and artists criticized KKR for its alleged financial ties to companies operating in Israeli settlements in the occupied Palestinian territories. In response, over 30 artists and collectives withdrew from the lineup in solidarity with the Palestinian cause, aligning with the global Boycott, Divestment, Sanctions (BDS) movement.

== Sónar and Barcelona ==
In 2004, Sónar contributed 47 million euros to Catalonia's GDP (according to a study performed by Deloitte) A follow-up 360º study commissioned by Sónar in 2015 updated this figure to 126 million euros; a 226% increase over the decade, with a net value to the city of 559.7 Euros per attendee.

The impact on hotel occupancy in the city is also considerable. Occupancy rate in 2011 was 83.65%, and in 2012 it was 83.11%. These figures increase to 100% for officially approved tourist apartments.

In addition to the above, Sónar also leads to the proliferation and organisation of other events, presentations and showcases that take place in Barcelona outside the scope of the festival itself, which in turn also attract very large audiences of between 50 and 70 thousand visitors, in addition to the 126,000 visitors attending the official event.

== Sónar around the world ==
Since making its first international foray to London in 2002, Sónar has expanded its presence globally, having hosted eponymous events in 65 cities worldwide and across 4 continents. All Sónar events reflect the wider mission of creating a dialogue between the local and international scene in each territory, and feature a strong creative technological component.

These locations have included: Chicago, Buenos Aires, São Paulo, Hamburg, Bogota, New York, Seoul, Rome, Cape Town, Copenhagen, Tokyo and Hong Kong. Sónar+D has also expanded its international program in recent years, forming part of the program in São Paulo (2015) Santiago de Chile (2015), Buenos Aires (2015), Reykjavik (2015), Bogota (2015, 2016, 2017, 2018), Hong Kong (2017) and Istanbul (2017).

In 2018, Sónar hosted yearly events in 6 cities, with a combined yearly attendance of 30,000..

In 2025, Sónar festivals will be held in Barcelona, Lisbon and Instanbul.

=== Sónar Reykjavik ===
Sónar Reykjavik takes place across four stages in the HARPA concert hall. Notable acts to have played include Skrillex, Underworld, Danny Brown, Fatboy Slim, Gus Gus, Kiasmos and Paul Kalkbrenner.

=== Sónar Istanbul ===
The inaugural edition of Sónar Istanbul took place in 2017 at the ZorluPSM auditorium. To date, the festival has featured performances by artists including, Nina Kraviz, Black Coffee, Fatboy Slim and Jon Hopkins.

=== Sónar Hong Kong ===
In 2017, Sónar added Hong Kong to its international festivals. Taking place at Hong Kong Science Park the event has featured performances from DJ Shadow, Laurent Garnier, The Black Madonna and Squarepusher among others.

"In total, the festival featured more than 40 international, regional and local DJs and live acts – including 11 making their HK debut – as Sónar once again confirmed its reputation as the world's best electronic music festival."

=== Sónar in South America. ===
Beginning in 2015, Sónar has held several festivals in Colombia (Sónar Bogotá at Multiparque), Argentina (Sónar Buenos Aires at Technopolis Argentina), and Chile (Sónar Santiago de Chile).

Notable artists to have performed include Sigur Rós, Nina Kraviz, Dubfire, Pantha du Prince, Moderat and more.

== Sónar is part of We are Europe ==
Since December 2015, Sónar is part of We are Europe, a cooperation project co-founded by the Creative Europe programme of the European Union, led by the French organization Arty Farty (Nuits sonores Festival) and gathering 8 major European events joining forces in order to promote, create and produce innovative cultural practices, defined by creative diversity and exchanges.

== Sónar +D ==
In its inaugural edition in 1994, Sónar organized a fair for professionals with a dual dimension: a record and publishing fair (record labels, distributors, publications, publishers, promoters) and a technology fair (hardware and software brands, musical equipment companies). This format would undergo several incarnations over the years, gradually evolving away from the trade fair format and expanding to include art installations, film screenings, talks and conferences. Coinciding with the move of Sónar by Day to Fira Montjuic in 2013, this section of the festival program was re-imagined as Sónar+D.

Oriented as a 3-day congress of Creativity, Technology and Business running concurrently to Sónar by Day, (SonaR+D = Sónar+D). The congress includes installations, talks, exhibitions and displays of new technologies with creative applications. Since 2017, a Networking Day has been added to the program. Starting one day before the start of the festival this event is oriented towards b2b activities, and only accessible to Delegate pass holders.

Sónar +D also feeds from and into the wider festival program, with tech-shows featured across all the festival stages, and prominent artists invited to give talks and workshops. Recent editions have featured artists and thinkers such as Brian Eno, Björk, Jean-Michel Jarre, Richie Hawtin, Kode 9, Holly Herndon, Alva Noto and Ryuichi Sakamoto.

As of 2018, companies and institutions that have actively participated in Sónar+D include BBC R+D, Spotify, Google Arts and Culture, Universal Music Group, Sony Music, PS4, HP, Me by Melia, Mediapro, Native Instruments, MIT Media Lab, Roland Instruments and Pioneer DJ, among others.

Sónar+D Hong Kong, takes place concurrently to the annual Sónar Hong Kong event at Hong Kong Science Park.

== Sónar Calling GJ273b ==
To commemorate Sónar's 25th anniversary in 2018, the festival embarked on an experiment to send 33 pieces of music to Luyten b, a potentially habitable exo-planet located 12.4 light years from Earth. Artists close to the festival who submitted specially created pieces of music include Jean-Michel Jarre, Autechre, Squarepusher, Nina Kraviz, The Black Madonna, Matmos, Laurent Garnier and Olafur Arnalds. The project was devised as "A celebration, an artistic and scientific experiment and a collective rumination on what it means to be human, and alien", and developed in collaboration with the Catalonia Institute of Space Studies and METI.

The transmissions took place in October 2017 and May 2018 from the 32 m EISCAT antenna in Tromsø, Norway operating at ≈930 MHz with 1.5 MW transmitting power and bit rates of 62.5 to 500 bit/s. The music was encoded as uncompressed PCM; due to the low bandwidth each piece was only 10 s long and sampled with 8 kHz, 8 bit, mono. The message will take approximately 12.4 Earth years to arrive at its destination, making a potential reply arrive in time for Sónar's 50th anniversary in 2043.

== SónarImage and film ==
Directed by Sergio Caballero since the first festival in 1994, Sónar's visual image is an intrinsic part of the festival's identity.. Sónar's website maintains an archive of visual imagery from each year's festival.

Since 2023, Sónar has also collaborated with the Universitat Pompeu Fabra in Barcelona, to organise the +RAIN film festival, billed as Europe's first festival for cinema generated with Artificial Intelligence.

== See also ==
- List of electronic music festivals
- Music festivals
- List of interstellar radio messages
- Boycott of Superstruct Entertainment festivals
