= Yad2 =

Israeli website

Yad2 (Hebrew: יד2, "hand two") is an Israeli website that publishes ads for buying and selling second-hand products (such as electrical goods, furniture, or free things), as well as a car, real estate, pets, job portal, and professionals.

== History ==
The site was founded in 2005 by Israeli Shawn Tel, owned by Coral-Tel Ltd., with an investment of $350,000. The site became a well-known brand and in the first year of its launch, about 1,000 new ads were published on it per day and tens of thousands of users used it per day. In 2008, the American investment fund Tiger Holdings purchased 49% of the site at a value of NIS 85 million. In July 2010, Walla! Communications Ltd purchased 75% from Coral-Tel for NIS 117 million, and in November 2013 it purchased the remaining 25% for NIS 50 million.

In 2012, the website launched a "ride-hailing board" to advertise paid transportation, but the board was not successful.

In May 2014, an agreement was reached to sell the "Coral-Tel" company to Axel Springer Digital Classified, a joint venture of the German Axel Springer Corporation and the General Atlantic investment fund, for approximately 800 million NIS, an amount more than four times the amount for which Elovitch purchased the site. The sale yielded a bonus of 12 million NIS to Ilan Yeshua, CEO of Walla! Communications Ltd . According to the indictment in Case 4000, Shaul Elovitch was in contact with Benjamin Netanyahu in order to receive expedited approval for the deal.

In September 2015, Yad2 acquired 70% of Drushim Portal, an Israeli job search portal. After that, Yad2 began selling its data to advertising agencies, a move that significantly increased the company's revenue, as it has an extensive database covering a variety of areas of activity. Yad2 also entered the field of market analysis for clients, based on the data it possesses, as well as the field of creating ads for business entities, and later also offered complementary products such as a calculator for calculating assets. Under the ownership of Axel Springer, Yad2 also began offering premium ads at a higher price. The growth of e-commerce worldwide also gave a boost to the company's activity.

Thus, if in 2014, when ownership changed, Yad2's revenues were 41 million euros, then according to estimates, the company ended 2024 with revenues of about 240 million euros while in 2017 the revenues had already doubled.

In 2017, an investigation revealed that the site advertised prostitution services disguised as massage services, despite a protest against such advertisements that had arisen in 2011. Following the investigation, a discussion in the Knesset Committee on the Status of Women and Gender Equality dealt with the issue, and the site's leaders promised to enforce the law more vigorously. Since then, the site has permanently removed the option to advertise massage services from its services.

In 2023, an online uproar began surrounding apartment rental ads that appeared on the Yad2 platform because the ads stated that the property was intended for Dati Leumi and Masortim only, following which Yad2 took action to remove them.

In February 2025, it was published that investment funds had begun exploratory talks with the American investment fund KKR, which was supposed to purchase Yad2, after the process of splitting the businesses of the German media group Axel Springer, in which it is a partner, will be completed.

== Business model ==
The site allows anyone to post an ad for free, according to a template offered by the site, for the sale or purchase of a product, such as an apartment, car, household equipment, and more. Yad2 offers brokers, car dealers, contractors, and individuals running small businesses an advertising and trading platform.

Yad2 sold its data to advertising agencies, a move that significantly increased the company's revenue, as it has an extensive database covering a variety of areas of activity. Yad2 also entered the field of market analysis for clients, based on the data it possesses, as well as the field of creating ads for business entities, and later also offered complementary products such as a calculator for calculating assets. Under the ownership of Axel Springer, Yad2 also began offering premium ads at a higher price.
