= Walla! Communications =

Israeli internet company

Walla! Communications Ltd.

- Walla! portal's main page as of October 2016
- Company type: Subsidiary
- Website type: web portal
- Available in: Hebrew
- Founded: 1995; 31 years ago
- Headquarters: Tel Aviv, Israel
- Owner: The Jerusalem Post (100%)
- Key people: Avraham Gabai (chairman); Gadi Hadar (founder); Erez Pilosof (founder); Gadi Hadar (founder); Ido Eshed (CEO)
- Net income: ▲₪132 Million (FY 2009)
- Website: www.walla.co.il
- Registration: optional
- Users: 2.5 million active users
- Current status: active

Walla! Communications Ltd (Hebrew: וואלה! תקשורת בע"מ) is an Israeli internet company headquartered in Tel Aviv and is fully owned by The Jerusalem Post. Until 2020, it was fully owned by Bezeq. Walla!'s web portal provides news, search (powered by Google Search) and e-mail, among other things. As of January 2022, Alexa rankings put it in the top 9 sites by traffic originating in Israel. Its online news outlet Walla (until March 2024 called Walla!; from April 2015 to February 2021, Walla!NEWS) is one of the major Israeli news websites.

== Etymology ==
The origin of the expression Walla! is the Arabic interjection وَاللّٰه meaning '"Really?!"'. The root of the expression is "Oh God" as الله means God.

== History ==
The portal was founded by Erez Pilosof and Gadi Hadar in 1995 as Israel's first online website directory, and soon afterward acquired by "Mashov Computers Marketing", a member of The Mashov Group headed by Yaki Dunietz and David Assia. In 1998, the company, traded on the Tel Aviv Stock Exchange, changed its name to "Walla! Communications Ltd". In the same year, the company was acquired by Formula Systems, headed by Dan Goldstein, and in 2001 it merged with IOL, a similar site run by the Haaretz Group.

IOL was also founded in 1995 and at its peak, in August 2000, employed about 150 employees. IOL operated an instant messaging chat similar to the "ICQ" software. In early spring 2000, IOL filed a prospectus for a public offering at a valuation of $60 million, but this was canceled due to the crash of Internet stocks on NASDAQ and a merger with Walla was decided. After the merger, Haaretz provided current affairs content to Walla! for several years. Afterwards, for a short period, the site incorporated content from Israel Broadcasting Authority.

In 2010, Bezeq acquired Walla's shares, and since then the company has begun to rely more on the site's staff, and less on content from other providers. Independent video studios were established in the company's building in Tel Aviv, where regular programs broadcast on the site are recorded, as well as a daily news edition. In addition, ownership of the Yad2 Tablets website was acquired. In May 2014, Walla! Communications Ltd sold Yad2 to Axel Springer. This was the highest acquisition of an Internet company operating in the Israeli market. The profits made it possible to establish a transparent studio.

On 2015, at an event held on Israel's Independence Day, the website changed its name to "Walla! NEWS" and the studio was inaugurated that began serving as the website's newsroom. Walla! began broadcasting an online news edition. From March 2017 to the end of October 2018, a main newscast, hosted by Yaakov Ayalon, was broadcast on the Walla! News website and Facebook page. On March 2, 2021, the website reverted to the name "Walla!". On April 6, 2017, Walla! NEWS launched the "Chamal" News updates application, based on user-generated content. During the year, a cooperation agreement was signed with ILTV.

During that period, the events of Case 4000 allegedly took place. Case 4000 (also known as the Bezeq-Walla affair; is a criminal investigation conducted by the Israel Police's Lahav 433 Unit, in cooperation with Israel Securities Authority, starting in June 2017. The affair, which included several sub-affairs, began with an investigation into the conduct of senior executives at Bezeq, Yes, Walla! NEWS, and Space Communications, and civil servants who acted in their capacity with Bezeq. The investigation later expanded to include suspicions of improper connections between Shaul Elovitch, who was the controlling shareholder of the Bezeq Group, and Israeli Prime Minister Benjamin Netanyahu.

With regard to Walla, the main suspicion is that between December 2012 and January 2017, Netanyahu took bribes and acted in a conflict of interest, by interfering in regulatory decisions that benefited Elovitch and the Bezeq Group, in a way that yielded Elovitch at least 1.8 billion shekels. In return, the Prime Minister allegedly submitted requests to change the nature and quality of news publications on the Bezeq-controlled Walla website so that it would serve them and their political goals and harm their opponents. Indictments were filed against Netanyahu and against Shaul Elovitch and his wife in this affair.

On January 28, 2018, the website crashed due to an unusual user load, following the publication of a recording of Sara Netanyahu.

At the end of 2020, the transfer of ownership of Walla! Media to Jerusalem Post, controlled by Eli Azur, was approved. The acquisition also included a merger between Walla! and Maariv.

In 2022, Walla Plus was launched, an application that presents all the video content that was already available on the site as a television channel. To these was added content produced by the other media arms of the Eli Azur Group, such as Radio 103 or Charlton's sports programs, and new content. The channel was broadcast on various over-the-top media services and broadcasting platforms, on the Walla website and applications.

In April 2024, a rebranding of the Walla website began, which included a farewell to the exclamation mark that had accompanied the brand for 30 years.

== Services ==
Most news stories that appear in Walla! came from the Haaretz Group, news agencies and other content providers. However, during the year 2006, Walla! started building an independent news and editorial staff, which produces original news stories and special features. In addition, Walla! produces original content in various fields such as sports, cinema, music, fashion and food. The website offers many programs and services, a search engine, E-mail, online shops, chats, and video on demand. As part of a collaboration with Hot, it also sold fiber internet.

== Controversy over ties to Netanyahu family ==
In December 2020, Bezeq owner Shaul Elovitch, his son and former Bezeq director Or Elovitch; former secretary Linor Yochelman, the former CEO of Yes, Bezeq's satellite TV subsidiary, Ron Eilon and former Yes CFO Mickey Naiman were indicted on charges of fraud, breach of trust, receiving illicit gifts and violations of the Securities Law. A substantial portion of the charges also concerned Walla! 's alleged favoritism towards Israeli Prime Minister Benjamin Netanyahu. Former Bezeq CEO Stella Handler wasn't indicted after agreeing to cooperate with prosecutors. On April 5, 2021, former Walla! CEO Ilan Yeshua testified that Shaul Elovitch ordered him to not report negative stories about Netanyahu. Yashua also testified that Shaul ordered him to also attack Netanyahu's political rivals and post stories favorable about the Israeli Prime Minister as well. On April 12, 2021, Yeshua told the Jerusalem District Court that Netanyahu was the "big guy" who persuaded Walla! to publish only parts of an interview he conducted with journalist Dov Gilhar a week before the March 2021 Israeli election, and that "any negative item led to outburst" from the Israeli Prime Minister. Yeshua also revealed a February 2015 text message which Shaul Elovitch sent to him in February 2015. In the text message, Elovitch stated that he had a problematic meeting with Netanyahu, whom he referred to as "the big one".

On April 20, 2021, Yeshua detailed more instances where Netanyahu showed authority over the editorials at Walla!, such as telling Elovitch to take down a news story which appeared on Walla! about a romantic relationship between Netanyahu's son Yair and a non-Jewish Norwegian woman, and also his requests for using the news site as a way to spread attacks on Naftali Bennett and his wife Gilat. On May 4, 2021, Yeshua stated that the Israeli Prime Minister also got Walla! to remove stories about "bereaved" families of Israeli soldiers who were killed during the 2014 Gaza War and whose remains were still held by Hamas. One notable family was the family of Hadar Goldin, an IDF soldier whose remains have been held by Hamas in Gaza since the 2016 war. He did not clarify who told the editors to erase these stories. However, he also noted how the Prime Minister's wife Sara Netanyahu also had influence at Walla! and how Netanyahu associate Zeev Rubinstein, whom he described as "their senior officer in the Byzantine court", was used to carry out Sara's "crazy requests and angles".

== See also ==
- Timeline of web search engines
- List of search engines
- Search engine
- Comparison of search engines
