= El Último Ke Zierre =

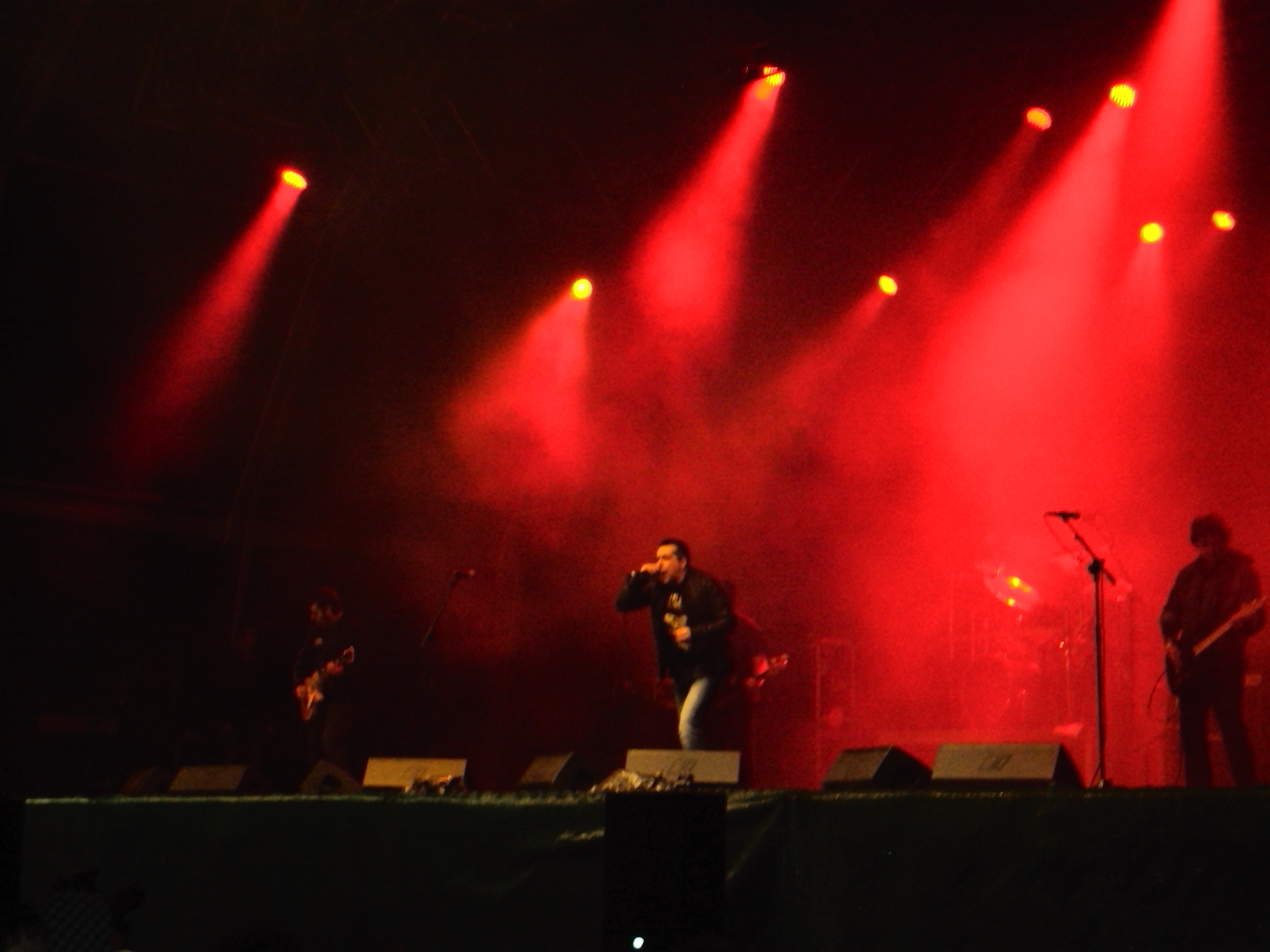
- El Último ke Zierre en el festival Viñarock 2012

Background information
- Origin: Burriana, Comunidad Valenciana, Spain
- Genres: Punk
- Labels: Discos Suicidas, Maldito Records, Realidad Musical, Santo Grial Records
- Website: https://www.facebook.com/elultimokzierre

El Último ke Zierre (abbreviated as EUKZ) is a Spanish punk rock group that was formed in late 1987 in Burriana (Province of Castellón, Comunidad Valenciana).

== History ==
Although the original line-up was Pedro (bass), Vicent (guitar), Oscar (guitar), Natxo (vocals), and Manolo (drums), it changed before recording their first album with the departure of Nacho and the arrival of El Feo. Their first LP, "No soporto vuestras caras," was released in 1991; "Soldadito Español" was released in 1992, and "Que se repartan el mundo" in 1993.

The line-up changed again with the departure of drummer Manolo and the arrival of Nano before recording their fourth album, "Esperando al viento", in 1995. After this work, they released "A cara de perro" in 1998, "Senderos de este infierno" recorded live in 1999 and "Bulla" in 2000.

Another change occurred: Vicent (guitar) left the group and Tonet arrived. A new album was released in 2002, "Veneno," followed by "¡Ay, de mí!" in 2003 and "Insurgente" in 2005. With "¡Vivos... por domesticar!" the band presented a live album in March 2006, and in April 2007, "Quemaste tus alas de ángel" was released.

In the middle of the tour for the album "Quemaste tus alas de ángel" (You Burned Your Angel Wings), Nano first (in November 2007) and then Tonet (in May 2008) decided to leave the group, replaced by Kusio on drums and Sam on guitar. This lineup change had already occurred in the band before (drums and guitar). Even so, the group didn't suffer any resentment and continued the tour, adding these two new members to the core group that has been in the group since its inception, formed by Oscar, Roberto, and Pedro.

In 2009, they entered the studio to create "La Burbuja," one of the band's most daring albums. Once again, they enlisted Juanki, producer of Veneno, at the helm, and recorded everything in Castellón at Rockaway Studios. The album was released in October 2009.

After the intense tour promoting this album in Spain, in December 2010 they decided to record three of the five concerts they would perform during La Burbuja's debut in Latin America. With this material, in 2011, they released a new live album, "Directo Al Tiro." Stronger than ever, Roberto, Pedro, Oscar, Kusio, and Sam review the group's discography with all their fans in Colombia, Chile, and Argentina, 27 tracks to describe these 20 years of the band's recording career.

In 2012 they released a new album, "La Rutina Del Miedo," which with 16 songs is the group's longest studio album.

In November 2015, it was announced that Sam was leaving the band and Tico was joining on guitar. After this new lineup change, far from being upset, he returned to the recording studio to shape a new album, "Cuchillas," which was released in February 2016.

At the end of 2018, they released a new live album, recorded in Santiago, Chile (Teatro Cariola), which they haven't released physically. For the first time, the band decided to exclusively release an album digitally, uploading it to major platforms such as Spotify, iTunes, YouTube, and more.

EUKZ has never been in a hurry for anything, nor has it set any goals, they have dedicated themselves to playing, composing and enjoying their group, without any pretensions, they have never sought to rise to the top by any means, they have always dedicated themselves to making their music, with time and without pressure, creating melodies or lyrics without forcing them, always giving it that touch of authenticity that has been captured in each of their works.

We can say that perhaps the success of EUKZ is based precisely on the fact that more than fellow members of a musical group, they are true friends who enjoy playing in a group, a group that is not alternative and much less commercial, simply a rock group.

== Members ==
Current members

- Rober "El Feo": Voz (1989–present)
- Pedro: Bajo (1987–present)
- Oscar: Guitarra (1987–present)
- Tico: Guitarra (2015–present)
- Kusio: Batería (2007–present)

== Discography ==
| Álbum | Año | Notas |
|---|---|---|
| No Soporto Vuestras Caras | 1991 | |
| Soldadito Español | 1992 | |
| Que Se Repartan El Mundo | 1993 | |
| Esperando Al Viento | 1995 | |
| A Cara De Perro | 1998 | |
| Senderos De Este Infierno | 1999 | En directo |
| ¡Bulla! | 2000 | |
| Camino De Rosas | 2001 | Recopilatorio |
| Veneno | 2002 | |
| ¡Ay, De Mí! | 2003 | |
| Insurgente | 2005 | |
| Vivos... Por Domesticar | 2006 | En directo |
| Quemaste Tus Alas De Ángel | 2007 | |
| Canciones Desde El Infierno | 2008 | Recopilatorio y Regrabaciones |
| La Burbuja | 2009 | |
| Directo Al Tiro | 2011 | En directo |
| La Rutina Del Miedo | 2012 | |
| Cuchillas | 2016 | |
| El Mutante Del Barrio Chino | 2017 | |
| El Lado Oculto de la Luna | 2023 | |
