= La Raíz =

Spanish band

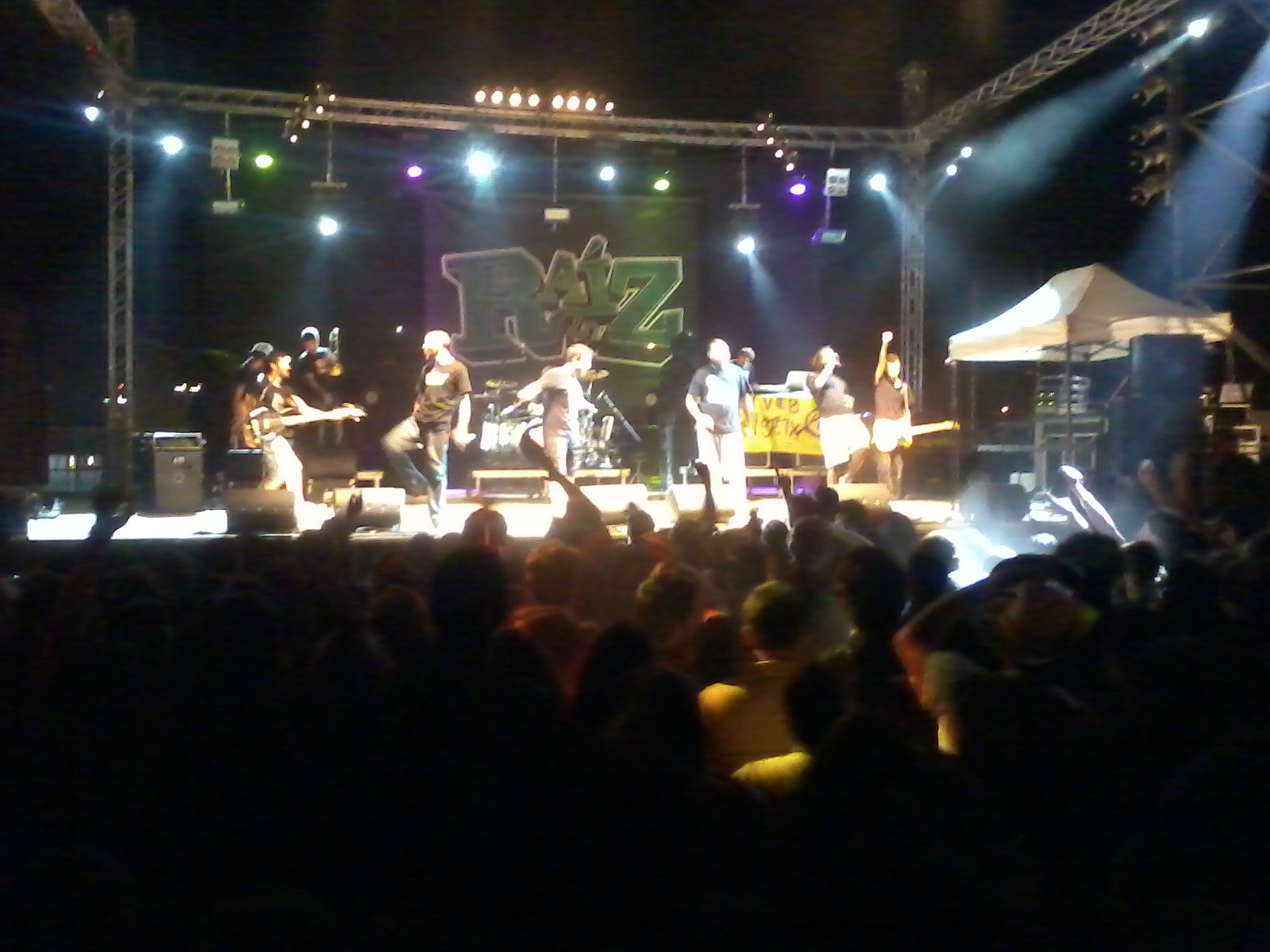
- Concert of La Raíz in Reus (Catalonia) 2014

Background information
- Origin: Gandia, Valencia, Spain
- Genres: Ska; rock; reggae; rap
- Years active: 2006-2018
- Labels: Maldito Digital, Propaganda Pel Fet!
- Members: Pablo Sánchez; Julio Maloa; Sen-K; Josep "Panxo"; Edu Soldevila; Juan Zanza; Adri Faus; Carles Gertrudis; Xavi Banyuls; Pipe Torres; Jano
- Website: laraizoficial.es

La Raíz are a Spanish band from Gandia (Valencia), Spain. They perform a mixture of rock, ska, reggae and rap. This kind of music is also known as rockstizaje. The band is made up of eleven musicians from different backgrounds and musical styles, with a great impact and strong verses in each of their songs. Their music is also known as a movement of intervention.

== History ==
La Raíz, as it is known nowadays, was formed in 2006, after the split-up of a former band also called La Raíz in which Edu, the current guitarist, was in. However, their music style was completely different. Since then, their intention was to create a big band with their friends, who were not necessarily musicians.

El aire muerto was the first demo that was released in 2007 and with which they started to know each other, looking for new styles and representing political rap and mestizaje. With this new and important perspective, Josep Panxo joins them, bringing them closer to a social movement. Later, Felipe joins the band on the drums and Julio Maloa as a lead singer. All of them established a qualitative change, laying the foundations of their model band, Hechos Contra el Decoro.

They self-produced their first work El aire muerto. In 2009, after releasing a song together with the Valencian band La Gossa Sorda, and receiving good reviews online, they started self-producing their new album called Guerra al silencio, a mixture of rock, reggae and ska. In September 2008, they recorded "Raíces" with La Gossa Sorda, a "budding" song that ended up being the beginning of the Guerra al Silencio, their first real album, in 2009. The group moves to sending a stronger and more committed message. Pablo moves from the guitar to lead vocals, and the arrival of Jim (with a rocker style) to the guitar. With these changes, they ended up laying the foundations of the group, as we know it today. In addition, a close friend of the band, Sen-K, joins the 3 voices that were already in the band (Pablo, Josep and Julio).

After two summers on tour with this album, they decided to include DJ Jano in the band. Carles joins on the trumpet and Xavi on the trombone as well. In 2011, they're recording El lado de los Rebeldes. Second band album, first studio album, recorded by the German producer Uwe Hoffmann. On this, they show their rocker and festive side, which is perfectly captured in live shows.

Between December 2012 and January 2013, they recorded their latest work, Así en el cielo como en la selva, at the RPM studios in Almàssera, with Roger García. It is an album with a greater musical and lyrical maturity, with which they remain faithful to their group of followers, and with which they continue to make the audiences who receive them dance and sing along in the new places they visit.

In 2013, they would once again exceed 40 concerts. In 2014, "Jilgueros Tour" took them around Europe. Meanwhile, they are already among the top bands in almost all the festivals in which they play in Spain. They went on a short tour of only 20 concerts in 2015 so that they could save money to finance their new album that would be released in 2016.

They released Entre poetas y presos in March 2016. This album includes 11 tracks that defend the dignity of memory, the identity of those who have been silenced, the obsolescence of some institutions such as the monarchy, and a cry to the bonfire of the continents with a crafted language and charged with rock. This new album could be downloaded for free through their website. This was a gesture of support with the organization Defender a quien defiende ("Defending who defends"), based in Barcelona in the NOVACT (Instituto Internacional por la Acción No Violenta). It encourages collective responses against measures such as the Spanish Ley Mordaza (Gag Law). Fifty percent of the album's earnings were sent to this organization. Likewise, the physical copy of the album was in the top 20 most sold CDs in Spain for several weeks. This year, the band sold out its tickets not only in Spain, but also in Europe. This was the first time they played out of Europe during their visit to Nepal.

In 2017, the band announced the "La hoguera de los continentes" ("The bonfire of the continents") tour, consolidating its international presence with Argentina and Chile as the first dates of the tour. Other cities and countries were also included, such as Berlin, Hamburg, Dublin, Rome, Lisbon, Porto, Poland, Mexico and Colombia. In addition, they ended the tour in Palacio Vistalegre. They released a recording of the concert.

On 14 December 2017, the band announced that 2018 would be their farewell.

On 2 February 2018, the live album was released, called Nos volveremos a ver ("We'll Meet Again").

In 2024 the band announced a reunion with one concert in Madrid. Due to the high demand, they announced a tour in 2025, with stops in various cities in Spain, including Valencia.

== Discography ==
- El Aire Muerto - 2007
- Guerra al Silencio - 2009
    - Intro
    - Malos Tiempos
    - Pobre Manuel
    - África
    - Raíces
    - Respiro
    - Esqueletos de la Soledad
    - Función Gigante
    - Señor Agente
    - Sumere
    - Guerra al Silencio
- El Lado de los Rebeldes - 2011
- Así en el cielo como en la selva - 2013
- Entre Poetas y Presos - 2016
    - Las Miserias de sus Crímenes
    - Entre Poetas y Presos
    - Rueda la Corona
    - Por Favor
    - De Piedra Tu Cuerpo
    - Nos Volveremos a Ver
    - Muérdeles
    - El Mercurio
    - Una Selva Asesina
    - El Circo de la Pena
    - Radio Clandestina
    - La Hoguera de los Continentes
- Nos Volveremos a Ver (live) - 2018

=== Singles ===
- "El Tren Huracán"
- "El Circo de la Pena"
