= Jerusalem District Court =

Court in Israel

- בית המשפט המחוזי בירושלים
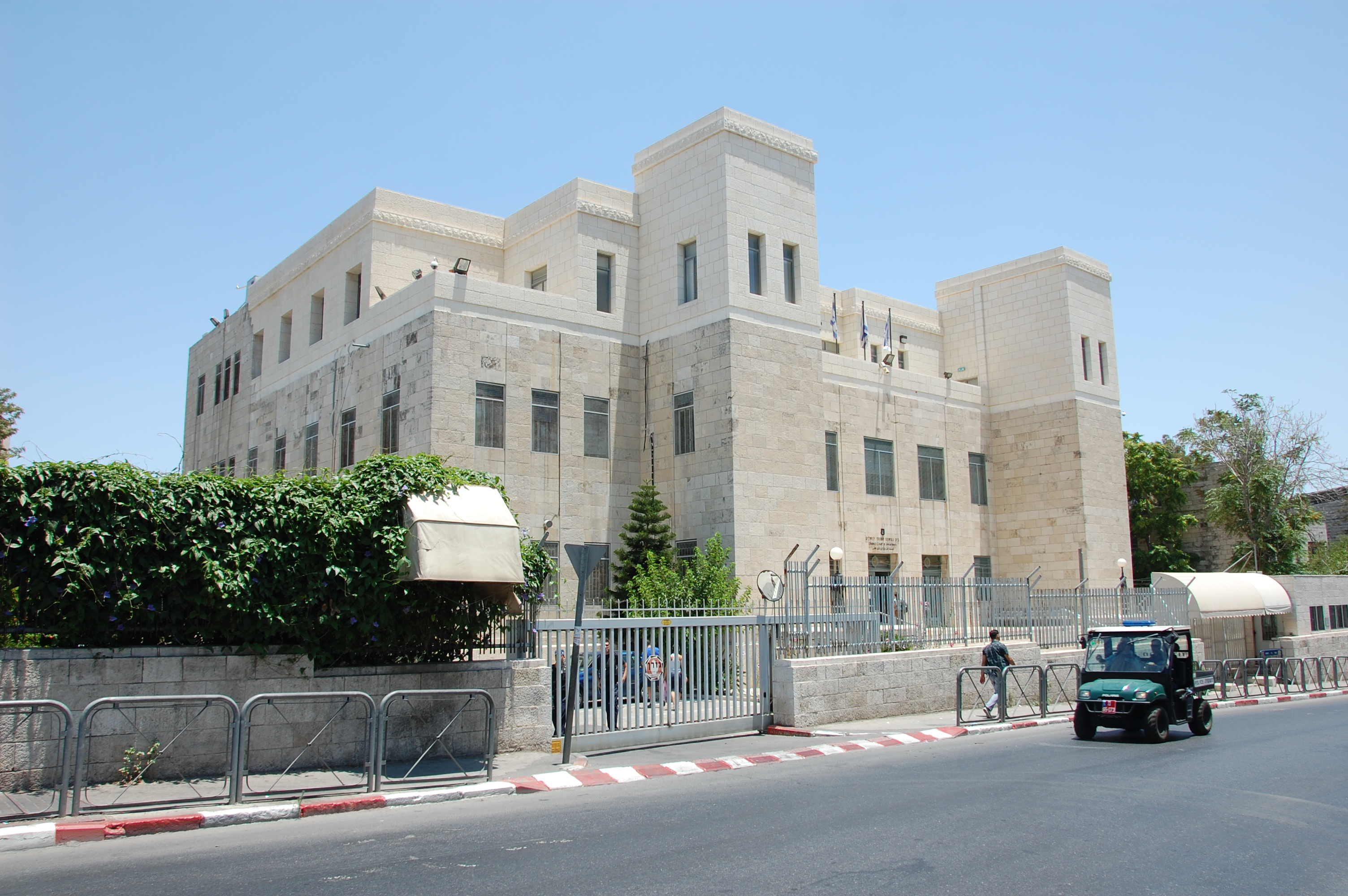
- Jerusalem District Court at Tzalach A-Din Street in East Jerusalem
- Interactive map of Jerusalem District Court
- Established: 10 August 1948
- Authorised by: Israel
- Appeals to: Supreme Court of Israel
- Appeals from: HaShalom District Court

The Jerusalem District Court (Hebrew: בית המשפט המחוזי בירושלים) is located in the Jerusalem District of Israel. It was originally established by the Mandatory Palestine government and has continued its operations under the judicial system of the State of Israel since its establishment in 1948.

After the Six-Day War, the court relocated to a building located at Salah ad-Din Street in East Jerusalem.

According to Section 17 of the Basic Law: The Government, any indictment against a sitting prime minister must be submitted by the Attorney General to the Jerusalem District Court.

== History ==
The Jerusalem District Court has been involved in several high-profile cases in Israeli legal history.

In 1954–1955, Benjamin Halevy, then-president of the Jerusalem District Court, presided over the libel trial State of Israel v. Melchiel Greenwald, more commonly known as the Kastner trial. The case evolved into a broader examination of the Holocaust in Hungary, and in his controversial verdict, Halevy acquitted Greenwald of most charges and declared that Israel Kastner had "sold his soul to the devil". This statement stirred significant controversy, and Kastner was later assassinated. The Supreme Court subsequently overturned Halevi's decision by a narrow majority of three to two.

In 1961, the court hosted the trial of Adolf Eichmann, a notorious Nazi official war criminal. To accommodate the high-profile nature of the case, proceedings were held at Beit Ha'am in Jerusalem. The trial, which garnered international attention, resulted in Eichmann's conviction and a death sentence, marking a historic moment in both Israeli and global legal history.

From 1987 to 1988, the court oversaw the trial of Ivan Demjanjuk, accused of being a guard at the Treblinka extermination camp. The trial, held at Binyanei HaUma (the International Convention Center), comprising Israeli Supreme Court Judge Dov Levin and Jerusalem District Court Judges Zvi Tal and Dalia Dorner. they concluded with Demjanjuk's conviction to death sentence. However, in 1993, the Supreme Court acquitted Demjanjuk on appeal, citing reasonable doubt.

In 2009, the court handled the trial of former prime minister Ehud Olmert, who faced charges including bribery, fraud, breach of trust, and falsification of corporate documents. He was ultimately convicted of fraud and breach of trust, receiving an eight-month prison sentence and a 100,000 NIS fine.

Most recently, in 2020, the court began the trial of Israeli Prime Minister Benjamin Netanyahu, along with co-defendants Arnon Mozes, his wife Iris and Shaul Elovitch, in what has become a landmark case in Israeli politics and law.

== Presidents ==
Name	Years
Benjamin Halevy	July 1948 – May 1963
Tzvi Eli Beker	1963–1974
Dr. Benzion Shershebsky	1974–1975
Flix Lenda	1976–1980
?	?
Veredimos Ziler	November 1989 – August 2003
Ya'akov Tzemach	August 2003 – July 2005
Mosia Arad	July 2005 – June 2013
David Hashin	November 2012 – December 2015
Aharon Parkash	January 2016 – January 2023
Moshe Sovel	February 2023 – Present
