= Bezeq =

Israeli telecommunications company

Coordinates: 32.006575°N 34.804938°E

Bezeq The Israeli Telecommunication Corp Ltd.
- Native name: בזק, החברה הישראלית לתקשורת בע"מ
- Type: Public
- Traded as: TASE: BEZQ
- Industry: Telecommunications
- Founded: 1984; 42 years ago
- Headquarters: Azrieli Center, Tel Aviv, Israel
- Key people: Tomer Raved (chairman); Nir David (CEO)
- Products: Fixed line, mobile telephony, Internet, cable television
- Revenue: ▲ ₪9.98 billion (2015)
- Operating income: 1,710,000,000 new shekel (2020)
- Net income: 1,040,000,000 new shekel (2020)
- Number of employees: 15,132
- Subsidiaries: Pelephone, Bezeq International, yes
- Website: www.bezeq.co.il

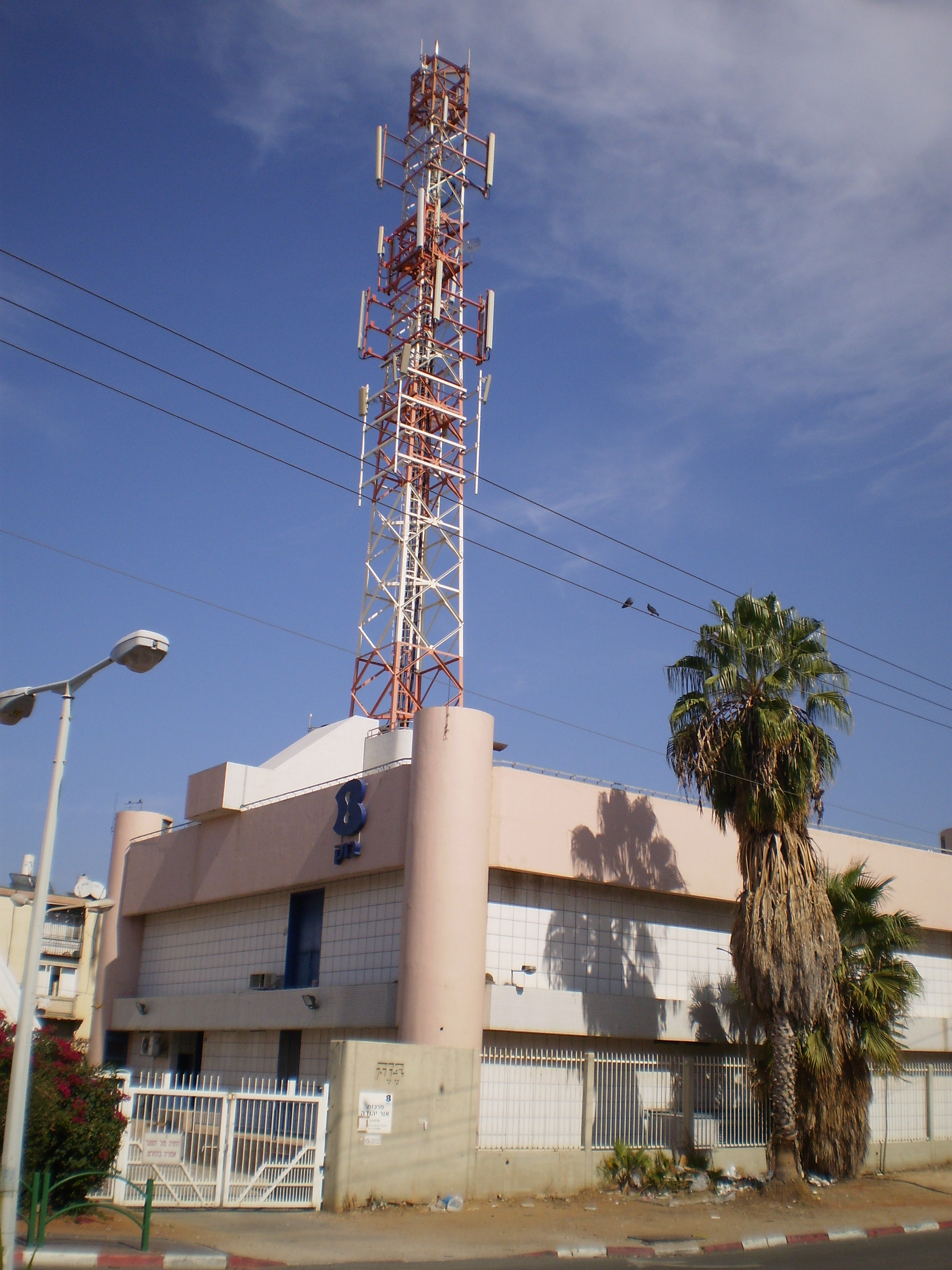
A Bezeq telephone exchange in Or Yehuda

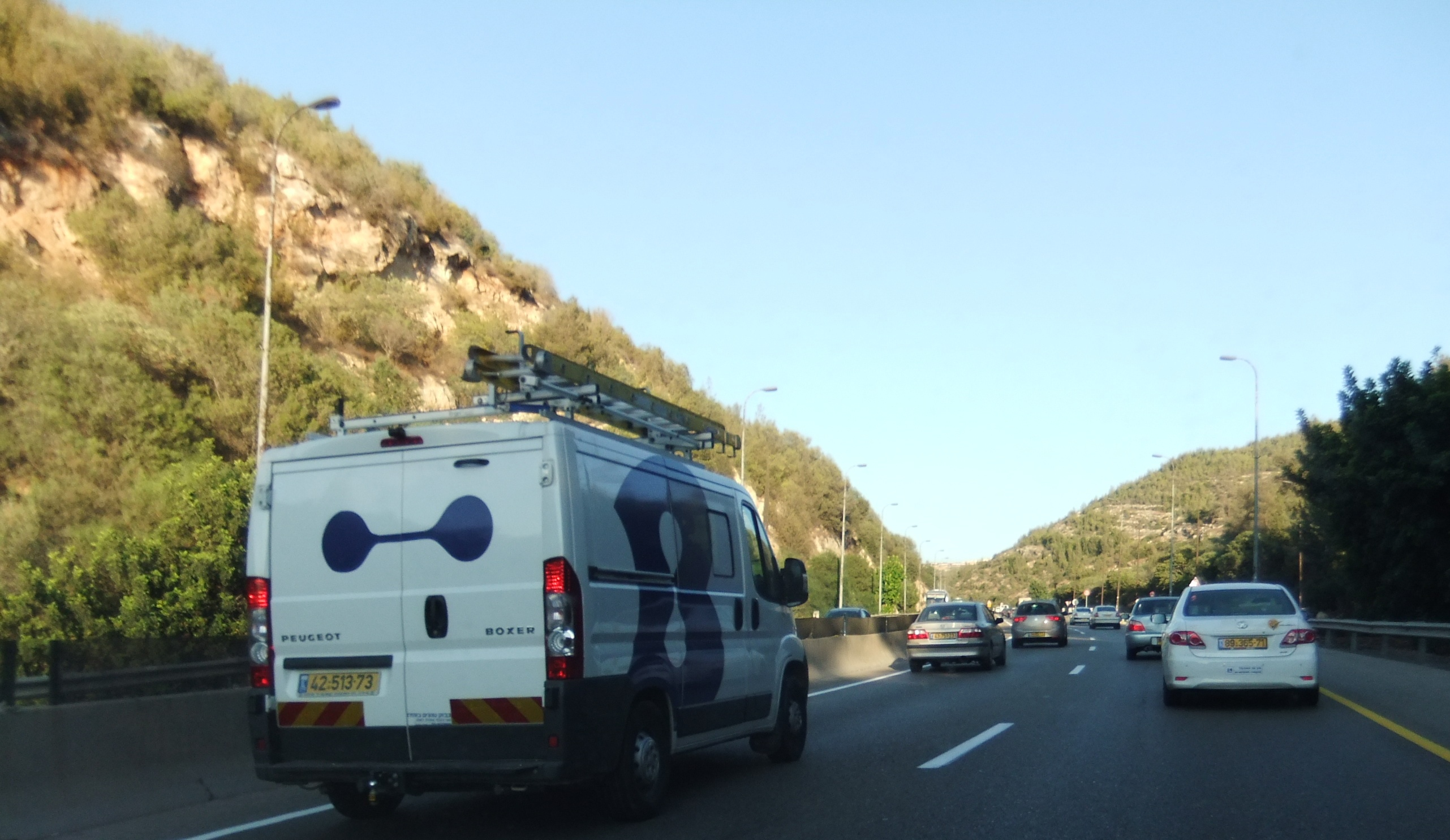
Bezeq company van

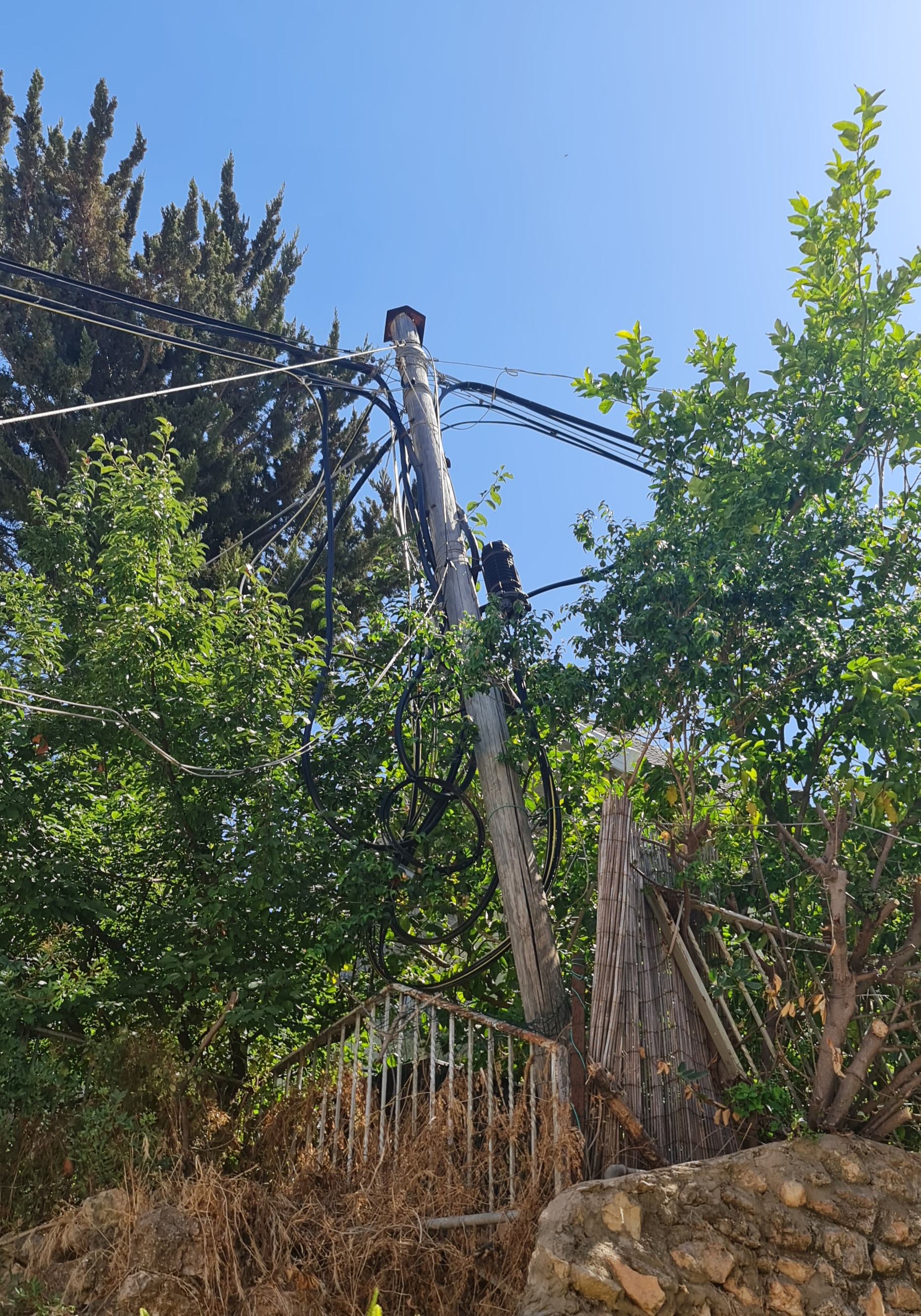
An old crooked and crowded telephone pole in the city of Nesher in Israel

Bezeq (Hebrew: בזק) is an Israeli telecommunications company. Bezeq and its subsidiaries offer a range of telecom services, including fixed-line, mobile telephony, high-speed Internet, fiber Internet transmission, and pay TV (via Yes).

The company is traded in the Tel Aviv Stock Exchange under the symbol BEZQ, and is part of the Tel Aviv 35 Index.

== History ==
In the late 1980s Anat Hoffman founded a group to protect the interests of Bezeq customers. A major complaint was that Bezeq did not send customers itemized bills. 46 cases were brought to small claims court and the consumers won 43 of them. Within two years of the campaign. consumers began to receive itemized bills.

Between 1996 and 2008, Bezeq operated a national DAB digital radio multiplex in Israel on a test basis. As of 2004, stations on the multiplex included the public Kol Yisrael stations Reshet Bet and Reshet Gimel, and the Israel Defense Forces stations Army Radio and Galgalatz. The broadcast ended when the Ministry of Communications issued an invitation to tender for a national multiplex using the DAB+ standard, for which no applications were received. As of 2021, Israel does not use DAB.

In April 2012, Bezeq acquired full ownership of Walla! Communications, Israel's leading Internet portal, which has more than 2.5 million monthly unique users.In December 2020, Bezeq sold its 100% stake in Walla! Communications.

Bezeq operates the B144 directory enquiries service.

In February 2015, Bezeq acquired full ownership of Yes, Israel's leading television provider, for ₪680 million.

=== Loss of monopoly status ===
Until the mid-first decade of the 21st century when it was owned by the Israeli government, Bezeq had a monopoly on landline telephony and Internet access infrastructure (ADSL VDSL2). Though still the most dominant provider of telephone services, it has had competition from the sole cable provider in the country (since September 2006), Hot, which offers a cables based telephone and internet access services as of 2005, and with 012 Smile and more recently 013 netvision and Orange.

=== Privatization ===
On 9 May 2005, Israel's Government Companies Authority, headed by Eyal Gabbai privatized Bezeq when 30% of its shares were sold by the state to the Apax-Saban-Arkin investment group for $972 million.

In April 2010, the controlling interest in Bezeq, held by the Apax-Saban-Arkin group, was sold to B Communications, a subsidiary of Shaul Elovitch's Eurocom Group, for $1.75 billion.

In late 2017, bank filed a petition against Elovitch to break up Eurocom Group to pay back loans totaling $275 million. This would directly impact the 10% shareholding in Bezeq, including Elovitch's 26% controlling stake. Meir Shamir has expressed interest in buying a controlling stake, effectively cancelling the debt to the banks. Two other investors have also expressed interest in purchasing a stake in Bezeq, including and Elliott Management, who announced they had recently purchased a 4,8% stake.

=== Police investigation and graft probe ===
In 2018 the company announced that company CEO Stella Handler would be resigning her position. She is one of several Bezeq employees under investigation by the Israel Securities Authority and the Israel Police regarding Bezeq's purchase of Yes shares and allegations of improper dealings with the Israeli Ministry of Communication. Also in 2018, board members Shaul Elovitch, Or Elovitch and Orna Elovitch resigned as a result of Case 4000, an ongoing corruption investigation involving the former Prime Minister of Israel Benjamin Netanyahu.

=== Involvement in Israeli settlements ===
In October 2017, Danish pension firm Sampension banned investment in Bezeq alongside three other companies operating in illegal Israeli settlements in the West Bank, including two Israeli banks, Bank Hapoalim and Bank Leumi, and German firm Heidelberg Cement.

On 12 February 2020, the United Nations published a database of 112 companies helping to further Israeli settlement activity in the West Bank, including East Jerusalem, as well as in the occupied Golan Heights. These settlements are considered illegal under international law. Bezeq was listed on the database on account of its "provision of services and utilities supporting the maintenance and existence of settlements" and "the use of natural resources, in particular water and land, for business purposes" in these occupied territories.

On 5 July 2021, Norway's largest pension fund KLP said it would divest from Bezeq together with 15 other business entities implicated in the UN report for their links to Israeli settlements in the occupied West Bank.

=== Parent company ===
B Communications, founded in 1999 as 012 Smile.Communications, is a publicly traded company. It currently functions as a holding company of Bezeq and is headquartered in Ramat Gan, Israel. Its shares are traded on the NASDAQ Global Select Market and on the Tel Aviv Stock Exchange. B Communications is controlled by Searchlight II BZQ L.P (60%) and TNR investments Ltd (11%).

== See also ==
- Communications in Israel
- Economy of Israel
