= Shaul Elovitch =

Israeli businessman

- 'שאול אלוביץ
- Born: 1 April 1948 (age 78); Poland
- Occupation: Investor
- Known for: Owner of Eurocom Group

Shaul Elovitch (Hebrew: שאול אלוביץ'; born 1948) is an Israeli businessman and the owner of Eurocom Group, one of the largest private holding groups in Israel.

== Background ==
Shaul Elovitch was born in 1948 in Poland and made aliyah to Israel when he was two years old. He grew up in Tel Aviv and married at the age of 20. In 1968, shortly after completing his military service, he joined his father-in-law's small business of installing intercoms and television antennas and importing telephones. For a time he studied law but did not complete the requirements for the degree, preferring instead to devote himself to his business pursuits.

== From R.A.P. to Eurocom ==
As manager of his father-in-law's company, R.A.P., the young Elovitch was also involved in the distribution of products by a telephone manufacturing company called Eurocom. Eurocom was established in 1979 to take the place of a telephone plant that had operated with Israeli partnership in Iran until Ayatolla Khomeini's rise to power. In 1985, Elovitch acquired Eurocom.

Partnering with Tadiran, Elovitch became the exclusive distributor in Israel of Panasonic's line of office appliances, including telephones, fax machines, xerox machines, and printers, through Eurocom Marketing (1986) Ltd. Next, in 1993, Elovitch signed a distribution deal with Nokia making him their exclusive distributor in Israel. A year later Cellcom entered Israel's cellular network arena and became a client of Eurocom's Nokia phones, and together the two rivaled Pelephone's Motorola-based dominance of Israel's mobile phone market.

== Bezeq acquisition ==
After various attempts to establish himself in Israel's communication sector since the late 1990s, including a failed move to compete with Bezeq through a company named Ofek, in 2009 it was reported that Shaul Elovitch was seriously contemplating the acquisition of either Bezeq or Partner Communications Company. Later that year it was announced that Elovitch had opted for a deal with the former. On 14 April 2010 the ownership of Bezeq was transferred from the Apax-Saban-Arkin group to an indirect subsidiary of Eurocom, B Communications.

== Spacecom ==
Spacecom Satellite Communications Ltd. (TASE:SCC) was launched in 1993 and is the operator of Amos communication satellites in Israel. The company has a market cap of NIS 1,1 billion on the Tel Aviv Stock Exchange. In 2015, Spacecom lost contact with AMOS 5, their Russian-built satellite causing a loss of over one third of total company revenue. The company, owned by Eurocom and controlled by Bezeq Israeli Telecommunication Co. Ltd. (TASE: BEZQ) has been on the market since 2013. Share prices in the group rose after Elovitch announced an offer from a foreign investor of $285 million.

== Indictment ==
In December 2020, Elovitch, his son and former Bezeq director Or Elovitch; former secretary Linor Yochelman, the former CEO of Yes, Bezeq's satellite TV subsidiary, Ron Eilon and former Yes CFO Mickey Naiman were indicted on charges of fraud, breach of trust, receiving illicit gifts and violations of the Securities Law. A substantial portion of the charges also concerned Bezeq subsidy Walla's favoritism towards Israeli Prime Minister Benjamin Netanyahu. Former Bezeq CEO Stella Handler wasn't indicted after agreeing to cooperate with prosecutors. During Benjamin Netanyahu's corruption trial, a text message Elovitch sent to former Walla! CEO Ilan Yeshua in February 2015 was revealed where Shaul stated that he was having problems all day with Netanyahu, who he identified as "the big one." Elovitch's wife Iris has also been charged with bribery.
