= Elco Ltd. =

International conglomerate holding company

- Native name: אלקו בע"מ
- Type: Public
- Traded as: TASE: ELCO
- Industry: Electronics, white goods, manufacturing, construction, real estate, apparel, retail, food and beverage, others
- Founded: 1949; 77 years ago
- Founder: Alexander Salkind
- Headquarters: Electra Tower, Yigal Alon St 98, Tel Aviv, Israel
- Key people: Daniel Salkind (Co-CEO); Michael Salkind (Co-CEO) Avraham Israeli (Executive Vice President); Eliezer Vessesly (CFO); Mordechai Friedman (Chairperson)
- Revenue: US$4.76 billion (2021)
- Total assets: US$6.12 billion NAV (2021)
- Owners: Daniel and Michael Salkind (controlling shareholders)
- Number of employees: 21,000 (2021)
- Website: elco.co.il

Elco Ltd. is an international conglomerate holding company headquartered in Tel Aviv, Israel. The company was founded in 1949 by Alexander Salkind, and has been managed since its establishment by three generations of the Salkind family. It is the parent company of Electra, Electra Consumer Products, Electra Real Estate, Supergas and others. By 2021 the company's subsidiaries were active in 17 countries, with more than 21,000 employees, and a production site in Israel where it manufactures air conditioning units and electromechanical equipment.

The company is one of the top traded companies on the Tel Aviv Stock Exchange and is included in the TA-90 Index of top shares, trading under the ticker symbol ELCO.

== History ==
=== Background ===
In 1933 in Germany, Alexander Salkind left his home along with his family and relocated to what was then Mandatory Palestine. Prior to that he had owned factories in Germany and England producing parts for radios. Alexander's father had been an industrialist in Russia, and owned factories producing steam engines.

Alexander's son Gershon (born Georg, in 1928) studied at the Herzliya Gymnasium in Tel Aviv and later at the Swiss Federal Institute of Technology in Zürich. Gershon served in the Armored Corps of a predecessor organization of the modern IDF.

=== Early history ===
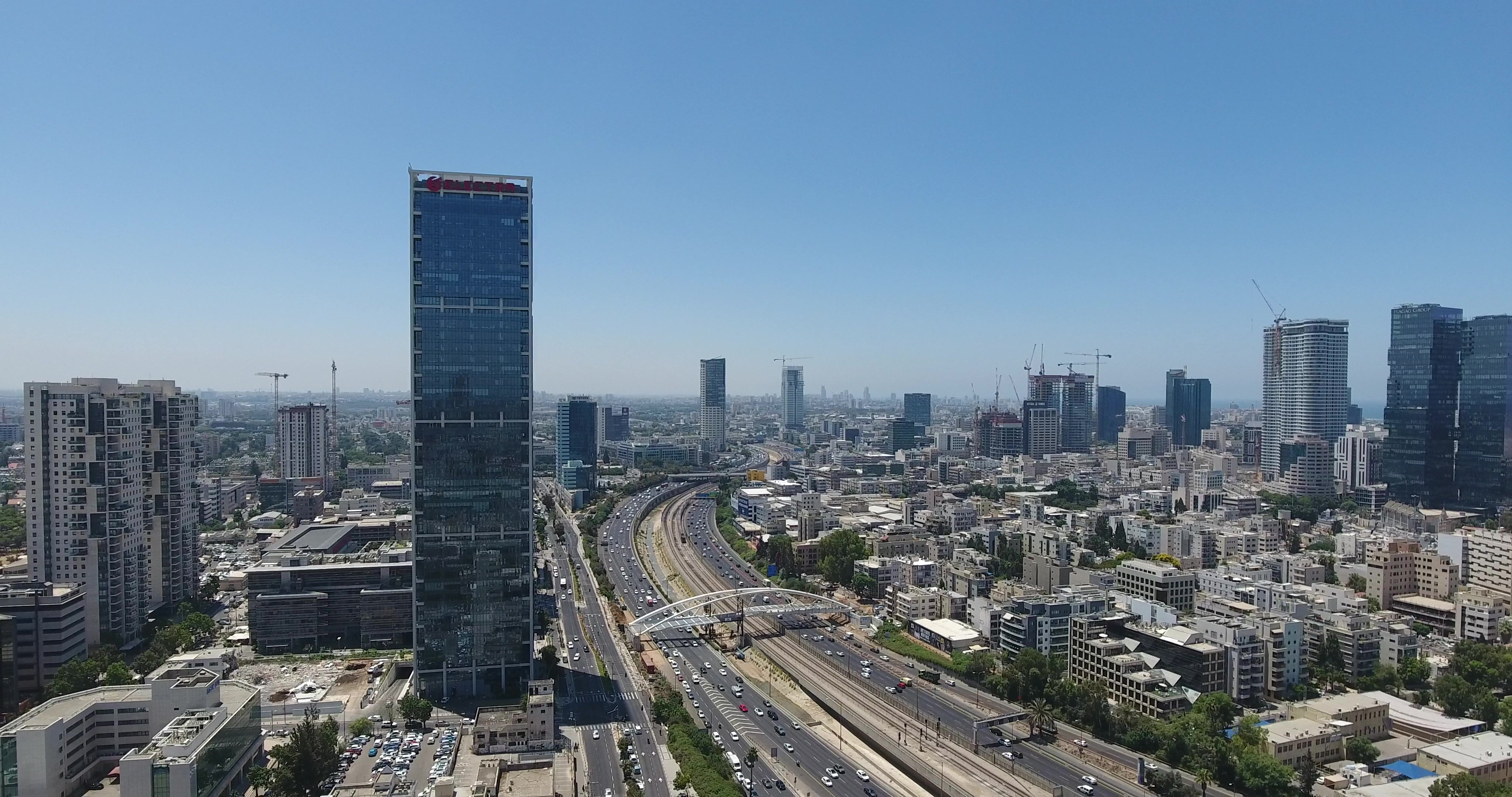
Electra Tower, Tel Aviv, headquarters of Elco

Alexander Salkind founded Elco in 1949, with J. Spielberger and Discount Investments, as an electromechanical factory in Ramat Gan. The company became the sole supplier of power transformers to the Israel Electric Corporation, and the company also exported its own products. In 1963, the company's securities were listed on the Tel Aviv Stock Exchange.

Alexander's son, Gershon Salkind, joined the company in the early 1950s, and in the early 1970s management of the company was transferred to him.

The company opened a new manufacturing plant in Ramat HaSharon in the early 1970s. Meanwhile, a factory for the production of electricity meters, under the subsidiary Elcomet, was established in Safed/Tsfat. In 1973, the subsidiary Elco Contracting and Services, headquartered in Herzliya, was established and engaged in the installation of electrical and electromechanical equipment. In 1975, the control and computer division Elcontrol were founded. A new subsidiary, Elco Fire Detection was established to engage in the assembly and maintenance of fire detection and automatic extinguishing systems.

In 1987, a number of shareholders attempted to acquire control of Elco. By purchasing the stakes owned by Discount Investments and the Danot Investment Company, Gershon Salkind thwarted the attempted takeover, and increased his share of the company to 80%. It was from this point on that Salkind made mergers and acquisitions a core strategy of the business.

In 1989, the company acquired the competing company Katzenstein Adler. In the same year, the company began a process to reorganize the group's structure, so that at the end of the process it became a holding company.

=== 1990–2009 ===
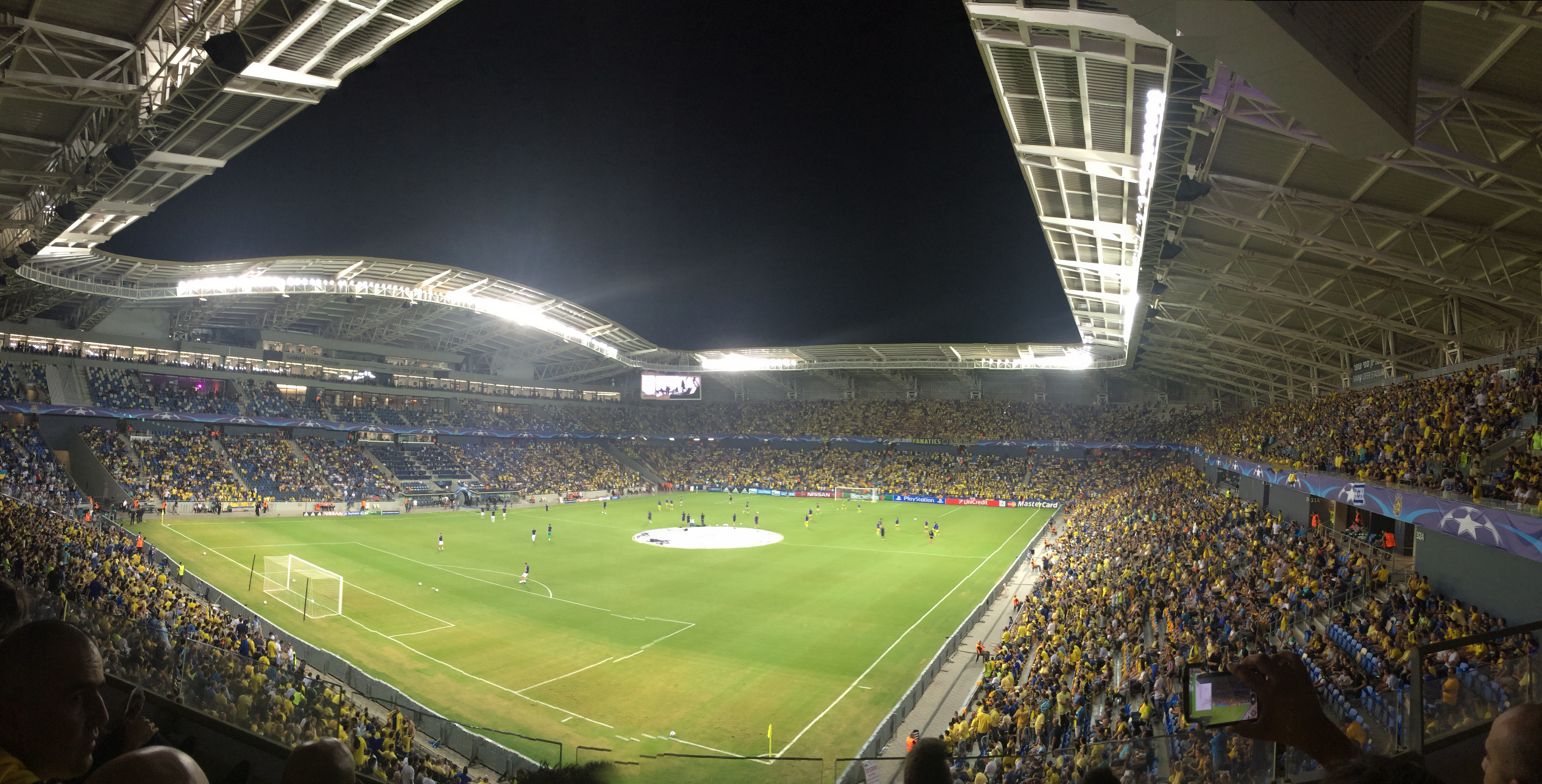
Haifa's International Sammy Ofer Stadium, an Electra Construction project

In 1991, Elco acquired Electra from CLAL Industries, and expanded its operations into the field of air conditioning, elevators, and contracting.

In the late 1990s, Electra Real Estate was established, which acquired income-generating real estate in Europe and the United States.

Elco acquired the French conglomerate Brandt in 2002 for 250 million euro, with unions welcoming the takeover. The resulting conglomerate was one of the largest white appliance manufacturers in the world, and engaged in the manufacture and marketing of products such as ovens, stoves, washing machines, dryers, refrigerators and freezers, and operated under the name Elco-Brandt for several years. It was sold in June 2005 for a profit of 100 million euro.

In 2008, the group's transformer manufacturing activity was sold to the Swiss industrial group Von Roll Holding for ILS 290 million, with a pretax capital gain of ILS 120 million on the sale, despite the 2008 financial crisis.

=== 2010–present ===
In February 2014, the company changed its name from Elco Holdings Ltd. to Elco Ltd.

In 2016 Elco sold the land in Ramat HaSharon where the company's manufacturing plant had been located. It also sold LAT, a residential real estate subsidiary in the US, and land in China. All of these transactions contributed to making the company debt-free for the first time, ushering in a new era of M&A.

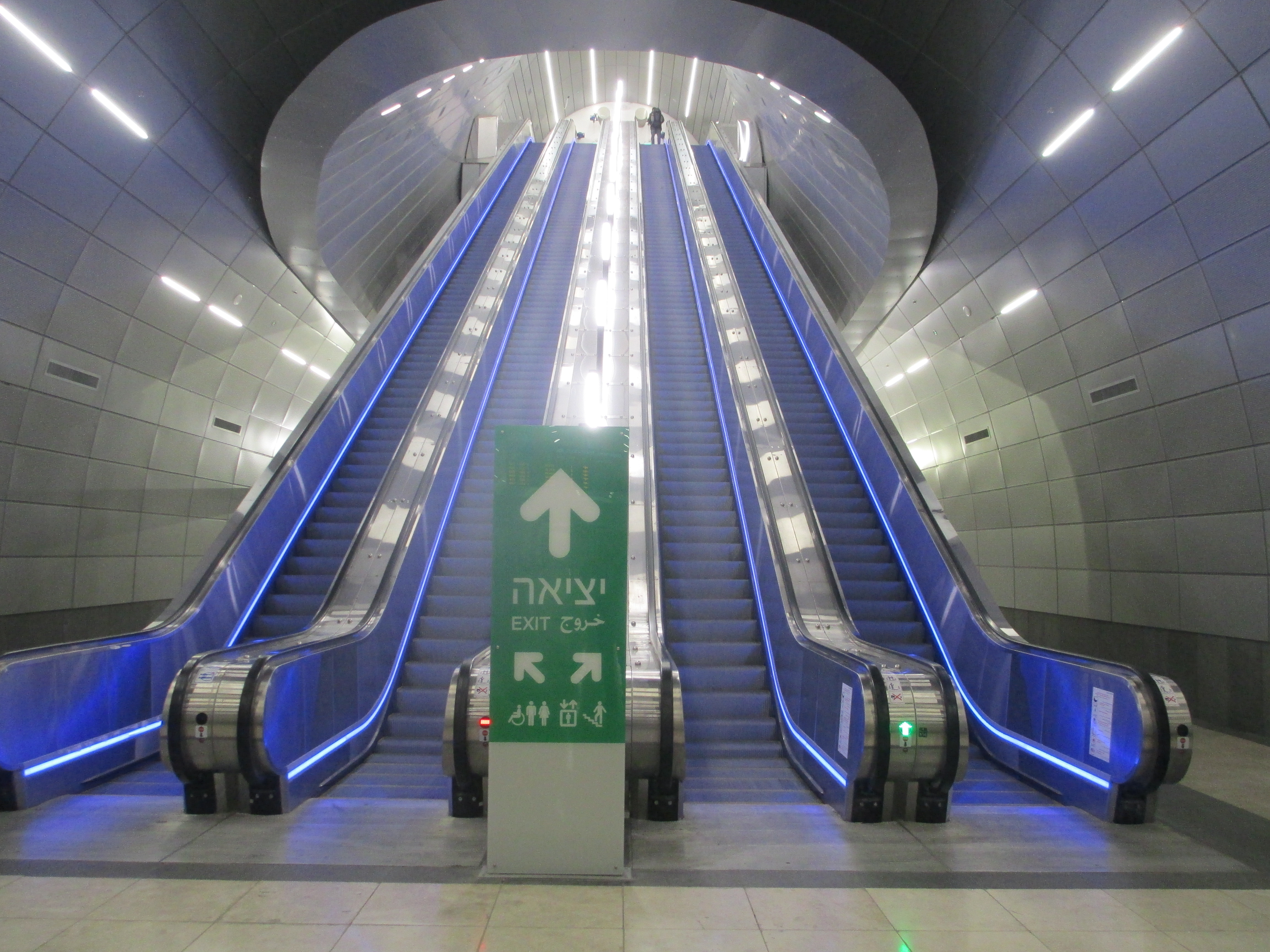
Yitzhak Navon railway station in Jerusalem, Escalators Project of the Year 2021

In January 2017 it was announced that Electra Consumer Products had reached an agreement to buy the cellular network Golan Telecom for ILS 350 million, and the deal was completed in April 2017. Electra Consumer Products sold Golan Telecom in August 2020 to Cellcom — one of the "big three" mobile operators in Israel — for a price of ILS 513 million in cash, making a capital gain of ILS 163 million.

In September 2017, the company acquired the operations of the Globus Max Cinema Chain for ILS 144 million (US$40.9 million), beating five other bidders.

Upon the death of Gershon Salkind in September 2017, his sons Daniel and Michael became the controlling shareholders and were appointed co-CEOs of the company.

In July 2019, Elco acquired Granite Hacarmel, which owns natural gas distributor Supergas, for ILS 770 million.

In August 2020, Calcalist reported that Bosch and Electra were to set up a HVAC manufacturing facility in Israel, in Ashkelon, investing US$29.6 million in the facility. The products manufactured in the facility will be distributed worldwide by Bosch, according to the report, with the companies expecting to control 10% of the European heat pump market within four years.

Also in 2020, Elco's subsidiary in Poland, Electra M&E Polska, signed an agreement with US electric vehicle manufacturer, Tesla, to perform electromechanical work at its first European production facility, Gigafactory Berlin-Brandenburg, in a deal worth US$80 million. According to Calcalist, Electra M&E Polska has also completed electromechanical projects for German auto marques Volkswagen, Audi and Mercedes-Benz in deals totaling more than US$75 million.

In January 2021 Electra acquired control of Amnon Mesilot, which owns 100% of Afikim, one of Israel's main bus transport companies, which it rebranded to Electra-Afikim. At the time of acquisition, Afikim was operating 840 buses on 250 routes, with annual ridership of about 60 million passengers. In May of the same year the company acquired Egged Ta'avura for ILS 200 million, resulting in it becoming the country's third largest bus operator.

In 2021 Elevator World magazine named the escalator at Jerusalem–Yitzhak Navon railway station the global Project of the Year in the "Escalators (New Construction)" category. Elco and long time partner OTIS carried out the project.

In May 2021 Elco acquired the supermarket chain Yeinot Bitan through its Electra Consumer Products subsidiary, with the deal including Yeinot Bitan's network of Mega-branded stores.

In October 2021 Electra Consumer Products signed a 20-year franchise agreement with the US-based international convenience store chain 7-Eleven to operate the brand in Israel, with an option to extend the agreement for a further 50 years.

Also in 2021, Elco took a 29.8% stake in IDB Investments, the owner of several well known companies in Israel.

== Subsidiaries ==
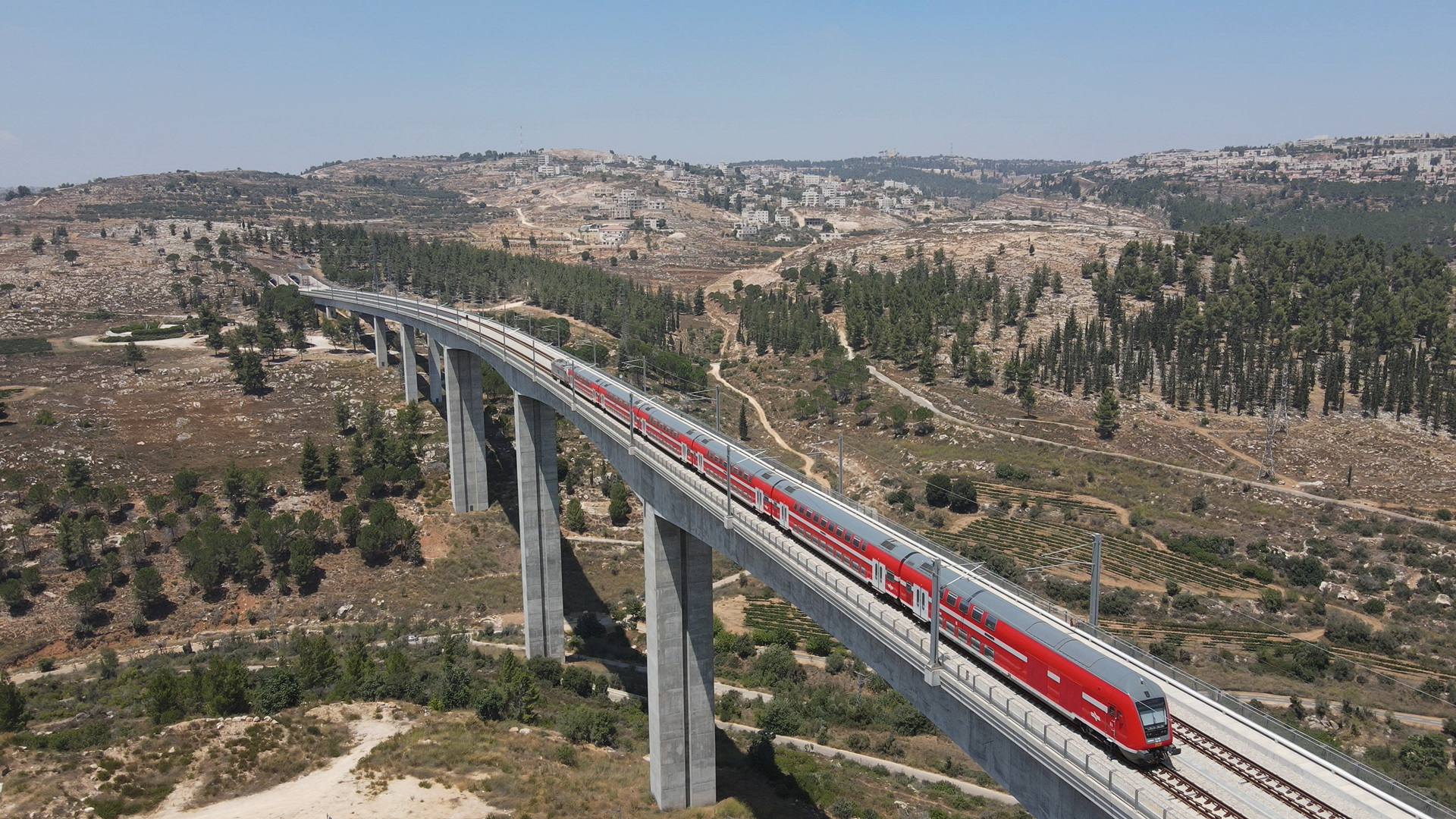
Electra was contracted to build and install systems in the tunnels of the fully electrified Tel Aviv–Jerusalem railway

=== Publicly traded subsidiaries ===
The company operates as an array of subsidiaries, four of which are publicly traded:

==== Electra ====
Founded in 1945, Electra's main activities are construction, infrastructure and electromechanical systems primarily in Israel and the United States; facilities management, and establishing and developing real estate projects. The company is listed on the Tel Aviv Stock Exchange and part is of the TA-35 Index, with annual revenue of US$2.5 billion in 2020. The company is headquartered in Tel Aviv, operates in 17 countries and employed 13,200 people in 2021.

==== Electra Consumer Products ====
Listed in the TA-90 Index, Electra Consumer Products is organized into five divisions: electric consumer products; retail of electrical consumer goods; food retail; sports and leisure; and real estate.

With more than 6,500 employees, Electra Consumer Products is focused on the import, export, marketing, sales, distribution and retail of air conditioning systems and electric consumer products. The company operates a chain of supermarkets and also holds the 7-Eleven convenience store franchise in Israel. The company also holds the concession in Israel for the global brand, Columbia Sportswear, and operates a chain of sports and leisure stores, for a total of 250 retail stores when combined, as well as owning 25,000 square meters of commercial real estate.

In 2021 the company partnered with a recycling company to build the first recycling plant for Large Domestic Appliances, also known as heavy electronic waste — such as refrigerators and air conditioners — in Israel, taking control of the entire value chain from production to recycling. The plant is planned to open in 2022, it will comply with European CENELEC standards, and will have a capacity of approximately 30,000 tons per year.

In late 2021 Electra Consumer Products announced a move into solar energy, having signed an agreement with SolarEdge, under which a subsidiary company, Electra Solar, will sell SolarEdge's products for domestic solar setups in Israel, and having also acquired control of Solar Sensei, which represents US solar panel company SunPower in Israel, and imports, produces and distributes solar equipment such as solar panels, converters, and optimizers.

Electra Consumer Products was included in a list of the best 100 companies to work for in 2020, by the business ranking firm, CofaceBDI.

==== Electra Real Estate ====
Electra Real Estate manages five private capital funds, with a focus on acquisition, management and rental of housing in the American Southeast, though is active is several countries. The company began as a multifamily residential real estate investment fund, and moved into other areas such as a debt fund and a US hotel fund, through its subsidiary Electra America. The company employed 800 people in 2021, and is headquartered in Tampa, Florida.

==== Supergas Energy ====
Headquartered in Netanya, Supergas Energy's main fields of activity are distribution of LPG and natural gas, establishing a natural gas distribution chain in Israel's central and northern regions, and planning and opening natural gas systems, including the opening and running of natural gas power stations and cogeneration projects.

In 2021, as part of a move into renewable energy, the company acquired a 30% stake in a renewable energy company which installs and develops solar energy generation sites in Israel, and later took in a stake in Balanced Rock Power, a Utah-based developer of utility scale solar projects throughout North America.

== Partnerships ==
Elco maintains a range of partnerships with global brands.

Company	Establishment of partnership	Sector
OTIS	1967	Elevators, escalators, moving walkways
Whirlpool	1991	Home appliances
Miele	1995	Domestic appliances and commercial equipment
Liebherr	1995	Heavy machinery and domestic appliances
Philips	1996	Electronics conglomerate
Daikin	2012	Air conditioning
Viessmann	2015	Heating, industrial, and refrigeration systems
Eaton	2016	Power management
Breville	2019	Home appliances
Bosch	2020	Broad-based conglomerate
Columbia Sportswear	2021	Apparel and outdoor leisure equipment
7-Eleven	2021	Retail (Convenience stores)
Carrier Global	[data missing]	Home appliances and air conditioning
Midea	[data missing]	Home appliances and HVAC products

== Social Good ==
Elco publishes an annual environmental, social and corporate governance (ESG) report.

=== The Gershon Salkind Scholarship Fund ===
Elco allocates US$1 million annually through its subsidiaries to the Gershon Salkind Scholarship Fund to sponsor academic studies for outstanding candidates.

=== Contribution to communities ===
The group and its employees contribute to a range of community causes. Elco community partners include:

- ILAN - The Israel Association for Children with Disabilities
- The Bne Arazim School: an elementary school established in 1974 for children with behavioral difficulties
- Lev Hash Association: provides assistance to socially disadvantaged groups with financial, health and mental problems
- Flora Gardens Haifa Complex: urban therapeutic garden and urban center for special education
- Etzion Bnei Brak School: a multi-regional school for children with cognitive difficulties
- Chimes Israel: helps adults and children with symptoms of cognitive decline
- Virtus Israel: experiential and competitive sports activities for children and adults with cognitive and autistic disabilities.

The Eitan Berglas School of Economics at Tel Aviv University lists Elco as a donor.

== See also ==
- TA-125 Index
- Economy of Israel
