= Telecommunications in Israel =

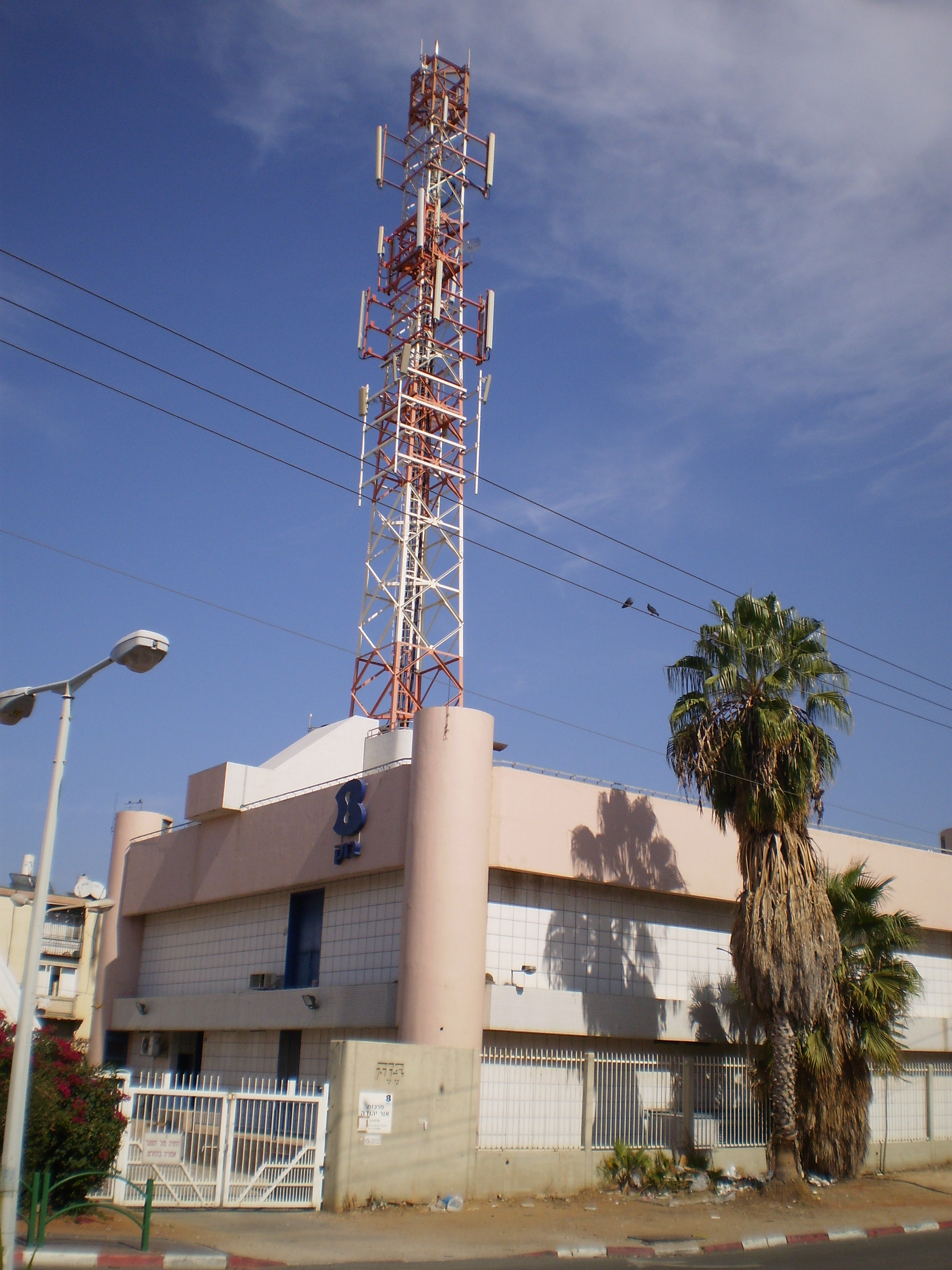
A Bezeq Cellular tower and telephone exchange, located in the town of Or Yehuda.

Telecommunications in Israel are the most developed in the Middle East. Israel's system consists of coaxial cables, optical fibers, and microwave radio relay. Prior to the 1990s, Israel's telecommunication market was dominated by Bezeq, a government-owned corporation. During the 1990s, the Israeli telecommunication industry transitioned from government owned monopolies to diversified private competition by a range of new companies. As of 2014, the telecommunications sector in Israel had revenues over ₪15 billion, representing about 2% of the GDP.

Technology and industry-wise, the Israeli telecom industry has been among global leaders in technology development pioneering developments of protocols such as WiMAX, VoIP and TDMoIP. During the 2000s Israel emerged as a leading supplier for the global telecommunications industry, and a global leader in technological research.

== 1940s–1960s ==
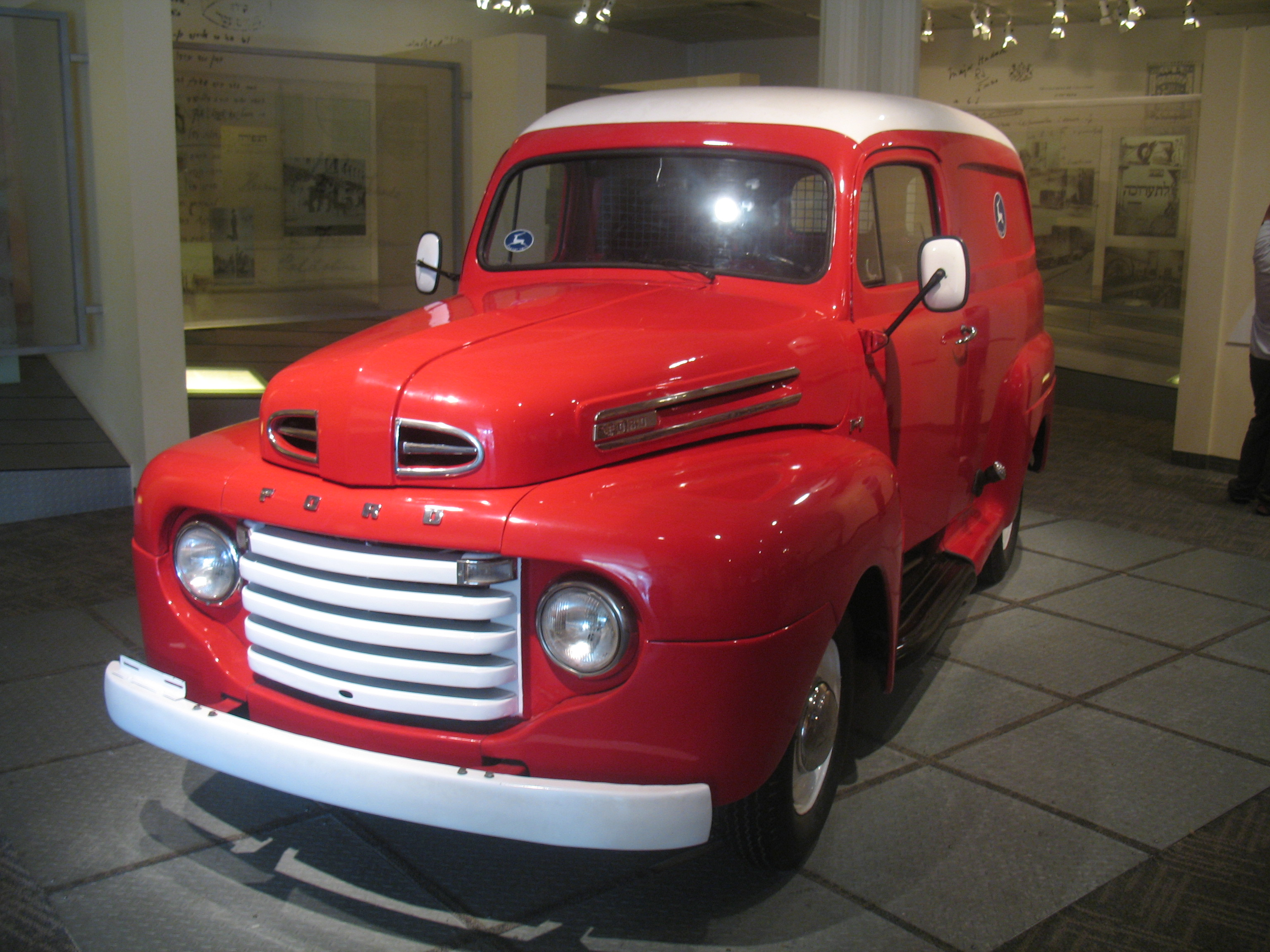
Vehicle of the Israeli Postal Service, on display at the Postal Pavilion of Erez Israel Museum

- 1939 – Yedioth Ahronoth is founded – the national newspaper of Israel.
- 1948 – The Israeli Postal Service (Ministry of Transport, Postal, Telegraph and Radio) replaced the mail service system provided during the British Mandate of Palestine.
- 1948 – Maariv is founded – Daily newspaper
- 1966 – The Israeli Educational Television began broadcasting on 24 March.
- 1968 – The public broadcasting channel Channel 1 (then called "The Israeli Television") started broadcasting with a live broadcast of an army parade on the Israeli Independence Day in Jerusalem.

== 1970s–1980s ==
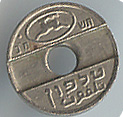
An Asimon, used for making calls on payphones.

- The Voice of Peace (קול השלום – Kol Hashalom) was a radio station that served Israel and the Middle East for 20 years. The station first went on the air in May 1973 from the ship MV Peace (formerly the Dutch cargo vessel MV Cito).

The 1980s brought a revolution to the communication market in Israel:

- In 1984, Bezeq was established to reduce bureaucracy and improve efficiency, significantly reducing the waiting period for the installation of new telephone lines.
- In 1986, the Israel Postal Authority was founded.
- In 1986, Pelephone (the first cellular company in Israel) was established by Motorola and Tadiran.
- In October 1986, the Israeli Channel 2 started experimental broadcasts which continued for a period of seven years.
- Arutz Sheva ( ערוץ 7 – Channel 7) was a radio station that served Israel for 15 years. The station first went on the air on 21 October 1988 from the ship MV Eretz HaTzvi (formerly the Maltese cargo vessel MV Mount Parnis).
- Pirate cable TV arrived towards the end of the eighties.

== 1990s ==
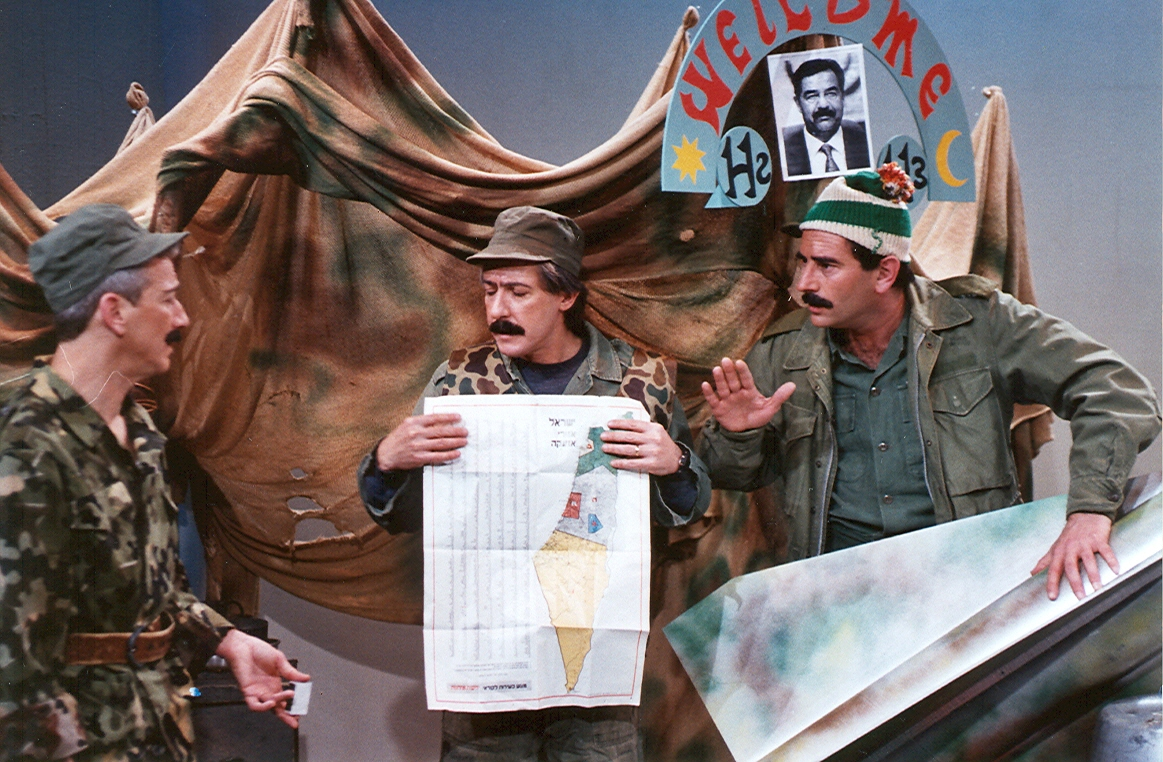
A comedy about Iraqi missile launchers during Gulf War at the Zehu Ze! TV program

The 1990s was a decade of marked change in the Israeli telecommunications industry, and massive developments in cellular communications, Internet, commercial television, and multichannel television platform such as cable television and satellite television.

- The Second Israeli Broadcasting Authority was established and the first Israeli commercial channel – Channel 2 – began to broadcast on 4 November 1993, which began the era of television ratings in Israel. The original agreement was that the broadcasting days of the channel were distributed among three broadcasting companies in order not to have a direct competition between them.
- The multichannel television platform in Israel began when the cable TV companies were established. Every company had a monopoly in a certain area of the country (according to a franchise given by the Ministry of Communications). For the first time, the Israeli public became exposed to tens of foreign channels from other countries around the world (which overtook the place of the Jordanian and Lebanese channels which were the only foreign channels received in Israel until then), and to new local channels on the cables: The children channel, the sports channel, the family channel, and the films channel. The move brought to almost total elimination of the pirated cable broadcasting in the country.
- The Israeli pirate radios experienced prosperity which happened in tandem with the establishment of legal regional radio stations, and to the reorganization of the military radio stations in 1993 (the establishment of Galgalatz in tandem with the Israel Defense Forces Radio, instead of the former two stations "Army 1" and "Army 2"). In spite of all the changes in the field of radio broadcasting, this medium lost the majority of the listeners ratings during the nineties, and by the end of the decade, the radio was considered to be a communication medium which had few listeners in relatively to the television.
- Although the majority of homes in Israel still receive daily newspapers nowadays, in this decade many main newspapers were closed, including Hadashot, Al HaMishmar, and Davar.
- In the mid-nineties, Internet and emailing became prevalent in Israel. Back then, the connection to the Internet had to be done by means of dial-up Internet access to the local Internet service providers such as NetVision and Internet Gold.
- In 1994, Cellcom joined as the second cellular network in Israel after Pelephone. At the start, the company experienced different problems with the devices they provided, when their users experienced many disconnections and intermittence during conversations.
- In 1998, Bezeq's monopoly on international calling services was ended with the addition of two other companies, Golden Lines, and Barak, who also began to offer international calling services . The activity of Bezeq in this field passed to its subsidiary Bezeq International.
- In 1999, Partner Communications Company joined the cellular communication market in Israel with the brand-name Orange Israel. Partner was the first company which built network foundations in Israel which worked under GSM technologies.

== 2000s ==
In the first decade of the 21st century there was a major emphasis on digitization and a shift to mobile technologies, following similar trends in Europe and North America.

=== Television ===
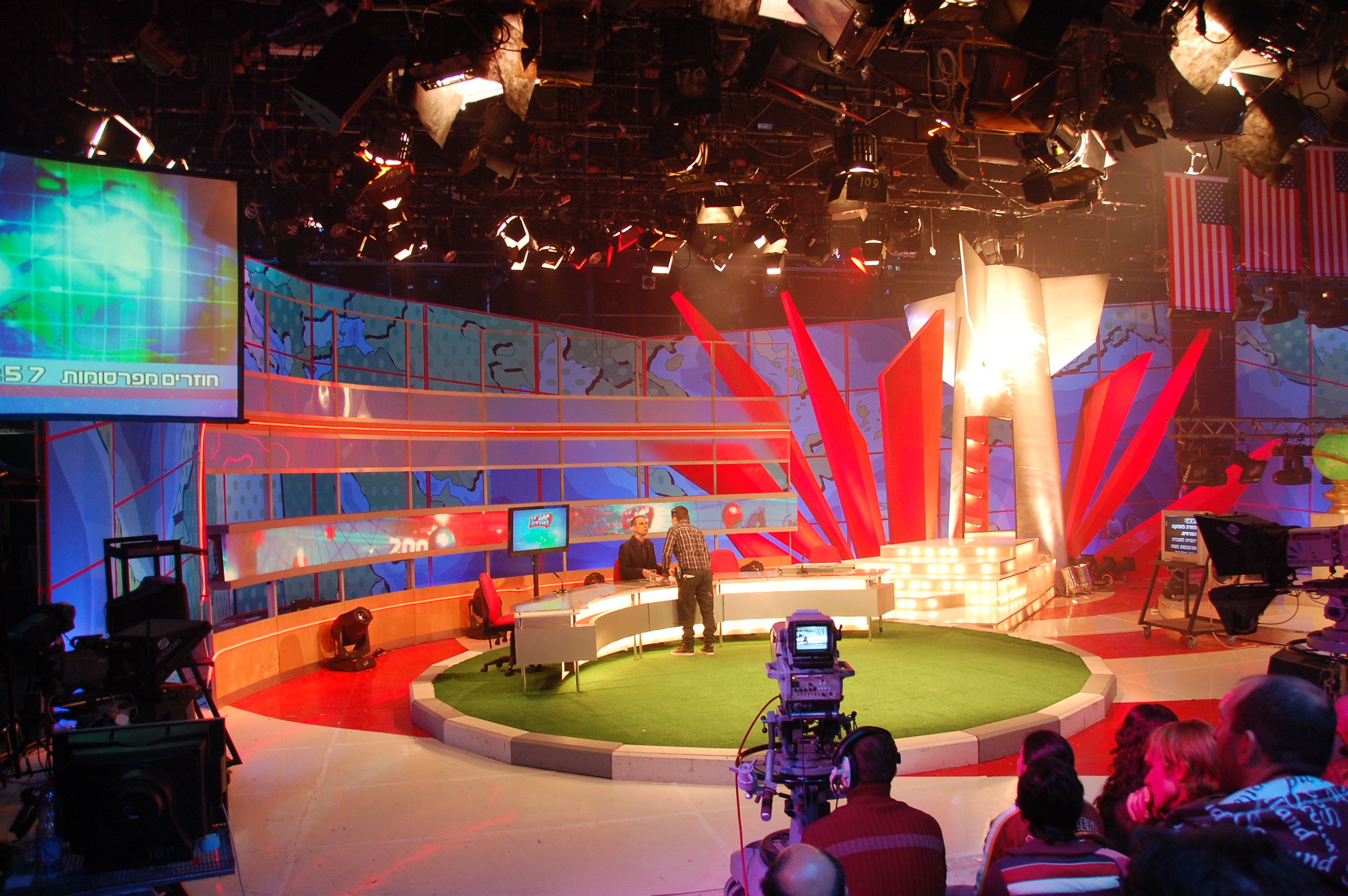
TV studio of the Eretz Nehederet program

The Israeli satellite television provider Yes was established in 2000, introducing strong competition in the cable television market. Prior to the establishment of Yes there were only three other cable companies in Israel: Tevel, Matav and Arutzay Zahav. The competition with Yes caused a big loss of members amongst the cable TV companies which urged them to merge. In order to strengthen Yes, which was relatively new, the regulator postponed his approval to the merger of the cable companies. The merger was completed in 2003, and the cable companies were renamed under the singular company called Hot.

Throughout the decade, Hot and Yes inserted the use of the digital set-top boxes, and with them it became possible to receive digital broadcasts (improvement in the quality of reception of the television channels), and additionally also enabled games channels, video on demand (V.O.D) and nowadays they supply digital set-top boxes which contain advanced digital video recorder (DVR) technologies which are capable of pre-recording shows (Hot Magic, Yes Max). HOT has put a big emphasis on encouraging production of local Israeli movies, while YES, in contrast, puts more emphasis on purchasing foreign TV series and movies.

Under the inspection of the Second Israeli Broadcasting Authority, an additional Israeli terrestrial-commercial channel was established on 28 January 2002: Channel 10. This move started a competition among the commercial channels. Channel 10 purchased for itself hosts and actors from Channel 2 and Channel 1. In spite of these procurement actions, the channel is still considered to be inferior in the amount of its viewers relatively to the other channels.

In 2005, an additional bid took place in channel 2, in which "Keshet" and "Reshet" were chosen to be the channel's broadcasts to the consequent decade. Israeli News Company won the bid to produce the terrestrial Knesset Channel. On 30 March 2010, all analogue terrestrial television towers were switched off and the Idan+ digital distribution service is the only operational digital terrestrial system. The first phase includes five SD channels (IBA-1, IBA-33, Channel 2, Israel 10 and The Knesset Channel). The system is DVB-T and MPEG-4 and in SFN configuration with two frequencies across the whole country (north and south are UHF 26 while central is UHF 29). A second phase with more channels was expected in 2012 (also IBA-1 HD) and a third phase maybe in 2013.

=== Internet ===
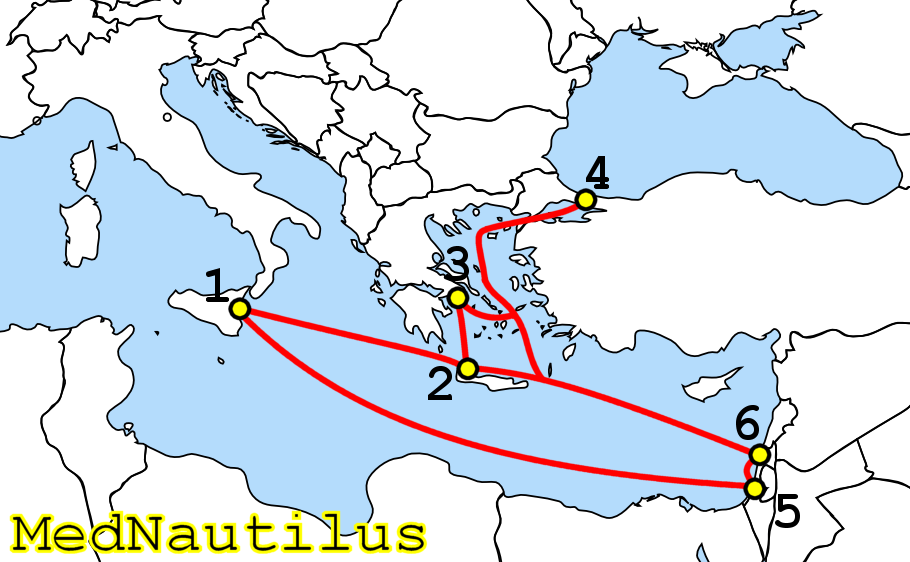
MedNautilus Submarine communications cables in the Mediterranean Sea, connecting Israel to Turkey, Greece and Italy

Broadband Internet became prevalent in the majority of homes in Israel. Bezeq ceased to be a monopoly in the field of the landline communications, when HOT started offering telephony services through the cables infrastructures.

In the middle of the decade, due to the popularity which the high-speed Internet and VoIP technologies gained amongst the Israelis, at first Israelis were able to conduct international conversations free of charge or at lower rates through the Internet due to the link between VoIP networks such as Skype and Vonage and the traditional telephony networks in Israel and abroad. In 2008, Partner Communications Company and XFONE joined the high-speed Internet providers market.

=== Other communication Fields ===
On 1 March 2006, The Israel Postal Authority became a government-owned corporation, the Israel Postal Company, as a preceding stage to the opening of the mail market to competition. The Israeli radio succeeded to recover from rating problems and opened more regional radio stations.

On 17 December 2007, the Israeli parliament approved a new law which enables the Israel police and other law enforcement bodies to access communication data without judicial inspection.

On 4 June 2008, the Ministry of Communications published a concession for operating a system which would enable broadcasting of digital radio transmissions in Israel. Over 50 stations nationwide are estimated to be broadcasting their transmissions on the Israeli digital radio broadcasts.

== Present ==
=== Press ===
Israel has three main commercial daily newspapers: Yedioth Ahronoth, Maariv and Haaretz. Additionally, there are also two large free daily newspapers: Israel Hayom and Israel Post (belongs to The Jerusalem Post). Other major newspapers include the Russian-language Vesti, the English-language The Jerusalem Post, etc.

=== Mail ===
The mail field in Israel treads towards competition. The Mail Authority became the Israel Postal Company. Gradually, the government-owned postal company enabled additional companies to enter the market of postal deliveries of mail with a weight up to half a kilogram; this was done so that they could compete with the governmental mail company, allowing the postage rates to drop.

=== Radio ===
In contrast with the state which exists in the television field, in the radio field, the Israel Broadcasting Authority is allowed to produce earnings from advertising. The radio section of the Israel Broadcasting Authority is called Kol Yisrael ("Voice Of Israel").

Reshet Bet is the leading radio station in Israel. Two additional radio stations belong to the Israeli defense forces: Israel Defense Forces Radio and Galgalatz. In addition to the main radio stations which could be received throughout the country, there are also regional commercial radio stations broadcasting under the auspices of the Second Authority for Television and Radio. There is a severe problem in Israel with pirated radio stations.

=== Landline telephony ===
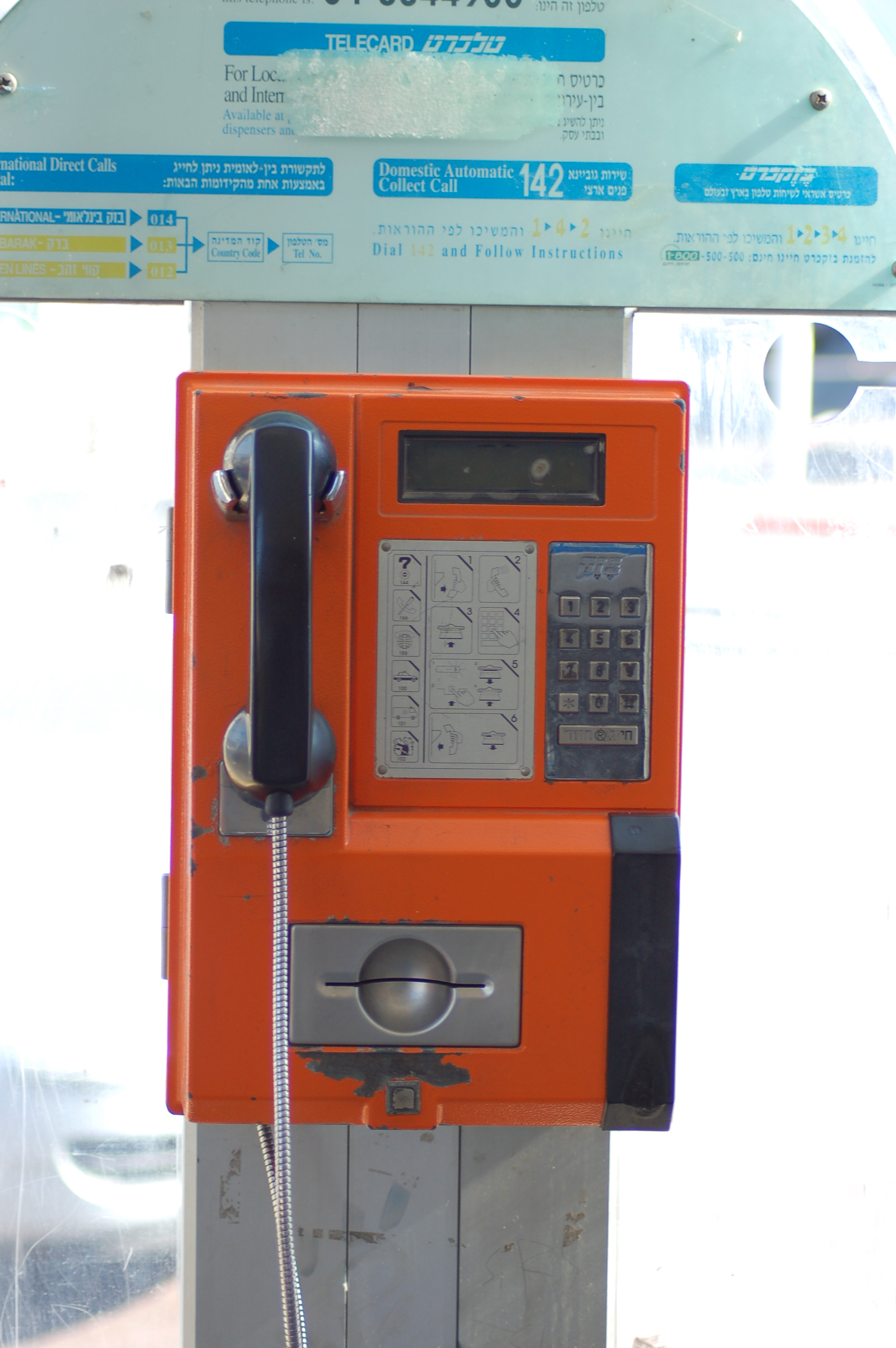
Payphone in Haifa

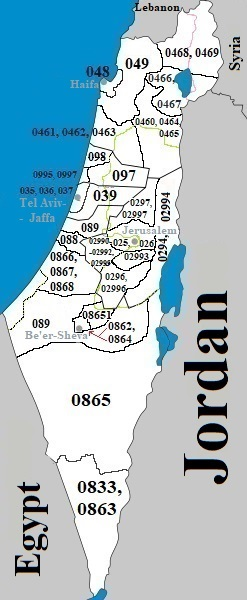
Geographic area codes of Israel

As of 2020, Bezeq, HOT, Partner and Cellcom offer landline telephony services. Bezeq offers traditional services, while the others offer Voice over IP, with Hot's service being routed through an intranet.

In 2020, Bezeq had 9,500 payphones throughout the country. In December of the same year, they received permission from the government to dismantle the vast majority of these phones, leaving only those in active use and those within closed spaces, e.g. prisons, where other choices are not available.

=== International calls ===
As of October 2016, eight operators, 012 – 012 Smile, 013 – 013 NetVision, 014 – Bezeq International, 015 – Hallo 015, 016 – Golan Telecom, 017 – Hot Mobile, 018 – Exphone and 019 – 019 Telzar provide international telephony: All the companies offer membership services which usually offer their customers cheaper rates. Membership might include some benefits such as billing, and dialing the default 00 prefix instead of the need to dial the specific prefix of the company (as it was done in the past, when Bezeq had a monopoly in this field). Because these companies have an extensive infrastructure of links abroad, the majority of them also provide internet services. Incoming calls are distributed through the companies relative to market share.

=== Cellular communication ===
As of January 2020, There are six major network operators in Israel which offer cellular communication service: Pelephone, Cellcom, Partner, Hot Mobile, Golan Telecom and we4G.

In addition, there are several MVNOs: Rami Levy, Home Cellular, 019 Telzar and Cellact. The services which these companies provide long ago passed the boundaries of voice conversations and currently provide also SMS Text messaging, Videoconferencing and Broadband Internet access.

=== Television ===
Cable and Satellite Broadcasting Council is a governing-body whose purpose is to facilitate and regulate the commercially operated television broadcasts in Israel. There are two companies in the market of multichannel television: HOT (which provides television services through an underground infrastructure of cables) and yes (which provides television services through satellite transmissions). The cable company has an advantage over the satellite company due to a permit granted to it from the communication office, which enables it to provide full bidirectional communications (for example the ability to provide video on demand services).

There are two commercial channels on Israeli television: Channel 2 and Channel 10. There also exist several niche channels which make their earnings from TV advertisements, such as: Israel Plus, Music 24, Channel 20 and the Israeli shopping channel. Additionally, Channel 1, which belongs to the Israel Broadcasting Authority, finance itself partially with the help of limited sponsorship announcements, although most of its budget comes from the license fees which every household in Israel, with a television and a digital receiver set, pays annually.

=== Internet ===
The Internet companies market is divided into two categories: infrastructure providers and service providers. The infrastructure providers are Bezeq and Hot. A third company Unlimited is building an internet-over-powerline infrastructure. At the end of 2017, the largest Internet service providers are Bezeq International and Hot (with Bezeq estimating "that at the end of 2017 its market share in the internet infrastructure market was approximately 70%"). The Israeli market was reported to have 10 internet service providers as of 2023.

=== International connections ===
Three companies operate fiber optic submarine communications cables connecting Israel and Europe:

Operator	System name	Year operational	Total design capacity	Landing points
Telecom Italia	MedNautilus	2002	3.84Tb/s	Italy; Greece; Turkey; Israel; Cyprus
Telecom Italia	LEV	1998	20Gb/s	Italy; Cyprus; Israel
Bezeq International	JONAH	2012	7.2Tbit/s	Italy; Israel
Tamares Telecom	Tamares Cable	2012	42Tbit/s	France; Cyprus; Israel

== Statistical data ==
Parameter	Amount
Fixed line operators	Bezeq, HOT, 012 Smile, Cellcom
Number of fixed phone lines	3.4 million (2014)
Cellular mobile network operators	Pelephone, Cellcom, Partner, Hot Mobile, Golan Telecom
MVNO operators	Rami Levy, Free Telecom – x2one Israel, Home Cellular, 019 Telzar, Cellact
Number of cellular subscribers	10.276 million (2014)
Multi-channel TV operators	HOT (cable), yes (satellite, streaming), Cellcom TV (streaming), Partner TV (streaming)
Number of TV subscribers	1.485 million (2014)
Number of Internet Service Providers (ISPs)	50+ (2014)
Number of broadband subscriber	~2.075 million (2014)
Average Internet speed	93 Mbps (2022)
ccTLD	.il
IDN ccTLD	.ישראל
Calling code	+972

== See also ==
- Communications in the Palestinian territories
- Media of Israel
