= Electra Consumer Products =

International conglomerate holding company

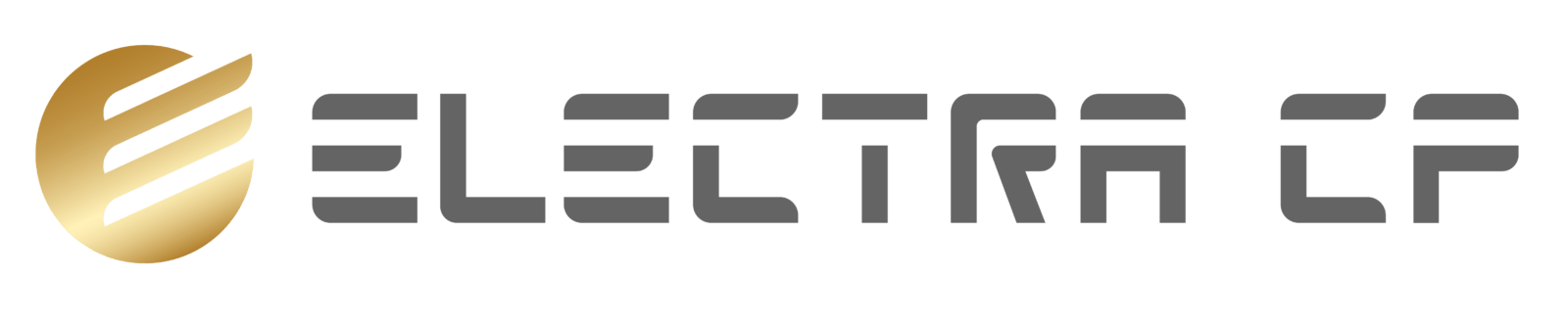
- Native name: אלקטרה מוצרי צריכה
- Company type: Public
- Traded as: TASE: ECP
- Industry: Consumer products, Retail, Electrical goods & home appliances, Food & Beverage, Convenience stores, Sports & leisure
- Founded: 1945; 81 years ago
- Headquarters: 1 Sapir St., New Industrial Zone, Rishon LeZion, Israel
- Key people: Zvika Shwimmer (CEO); Yoni Tsabari (CFO); Daniel Salkind (Chairperson)
- Revenue: ILS 4.64 billion (2021)
- Operating income: ILS 265 million (2021)
- Net income: ILS 171 million (2021)
- Total assets: ILS 6.00 billion (2021)
- Total equity: ILS 1.22 billion (2021)
- Number of employees: 6,500 (2021)
- Parent: Elco
- Website: ecp.co.il

Electra Consumer Products, stylized as ELECTRA CP, is an Israeli multi-industry public company which was founded in 1945. The company has divisions in the areas of electric consumer products, retail of electrical goods, food and beverages, sports and leisure, and real estate. Electra Consumer Products is traded on the Tel Aviv Stock Exchange and is a constituent company of the TA-90 Index of top shares, trading under the ticker symbol ECP. The company is part of the Elco Group.

== History ==
=== Early history ===
Electra Consumer Products began as a small electrical appliances repair shop in 1945. The company also began to import irons, food mixers, electric whisks, washing machines and refrigerators. In 1954, the company began importing air conditioners made by the American company, Emerson Electric, to Israel.

In 1961 the company opened Israel's first air conditioning factory, where it began to the development and manufacture of air conditioning units including the first window-mounted air conditioning unit in the market, and the market's first split A/C (consisting of two units, one outdoor, one indoor). Around then the company also began importing Westinghouse and Daikin air conditioning units.

In 1973 the company moved to a new industrial area in Rishon LeZion — just south of Tel Aviv and one of Israel's largest cities by population at the time — where it established a modern manufacturing plant over an area of 55 dunams (5.5 hectares, 13.6 acres).

In 1991 Electra CP was acquired by Elco Holdings.

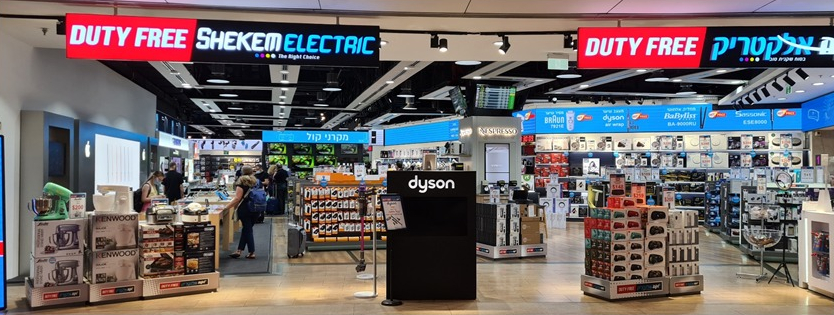
Shekem Electric Duty Free, Ben Gurion Airport

Electra CP opened the first Shekem Electric store in 1995, the first of what become one of Israel's main electrical retail chains.

=== 21st century: retail expansion, moves into recycling and renewable energy solutions ===
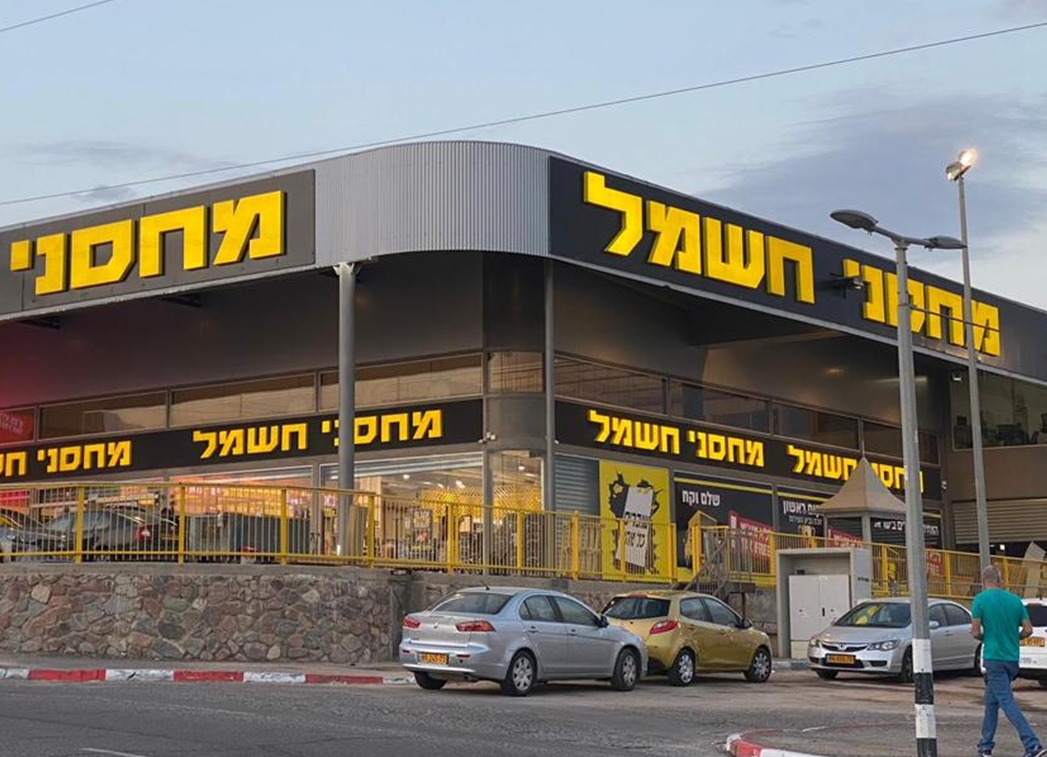
A branch of Mahsanei Hashmal

Electra CP acquired Mahsanei Hashmal in 2007, the largest electrical products retail chain in Israel.

The company went public in 2010, listing on the Tel Aviv Stock Exchange.

In January 2017 Electra CP announced it had reached an agreement to buy the Golan Telecom cellular network for ILS 350 million, and the deal was completed in April 2017. Electra CP sold Golan Telecom in August 2020 to Cellcom — one of the "big three" mobile operators in Israel — for a price of ILS 513 million in cash, making a capital gain of ILS 163 million.

In 2017 Electra CP became the domestic market leader in air conditioning, with 42% share of the market.

Electra Consumer Products was included in a list of the best 100 companies to work for in 2020, by the business ranking firm, CofaceBDI.

In August 2020, Calcalist reported that Bosch and Electra CP were to set up a HVAC manufacturing facility in Israel, in Ashkelon, investing US$29.6 million in the facility. The products manufactured in the facility will be distributed worldwide by Bosch, according to the report, with the companies expecting to control 10% of the European heat pump market within four years.

In 2021 the company partnered with a recycling company AllRecycling to build the first recycling plant for Large Domestic Appliances, also known as heavy electronic waste — such as refrigerators and air conditioners — in Israel, taking control of the entire value chain from production to recycling. The plant is planned to open in 2022, it will comply with European CENELEC standards, and will have a capacity of approximately 30,000 tons per year.

In March 2021 ECP moved into the duty free market under the brand Shekem Electric Duty Free, at Ben Gurion Airport. ECP Gained a foothold in the sports and leisure market in April 2021, acquiring SAAR Group and its three retail chains — 34 branches in total — under the Columbia Sportswear, Shvilim and Outsiders brands.

In May 2021 ECP acquired the Yeinot Bitan Group and its 152 supermarkets, buying 50.05% (35.05% by ECP and 15% by its financial partner, Phoenix) of the shares for ILS 194 million, and gaining a large foothold in the groceries market.

In October 2021 Electra Consumer Products signed a 20-year franchise agreement with the US-based international convenience store chain 7-Eleven to operate the brand in Israel, strengthening its position in the Food retail segment. The deal includes an option to extend the agreement for a further 50 years.

In late 2021 Electra Consumer Products announced a move into solar energy, having signed an agreement with SolarEdge, under which a subsidiary company, Electra Solar, will sell SolarEdge's products for domestic solar setups in Israel, and having also acquired control of Solar Sensei, which represents US solar panel company SunPower in Israel, and imports, produces and distributes solar equipment such as solar panels, converters, optimizers and aluminium structural parts.

In March 2022 the company signed a memorandum of understanding with the Carrefour supermarket brand, stating that the Yeinot Bitan and Mega brands will be discontinue, with their stores converted into Carrefour branches.

Electra Consumer Products reached a market cap of ILS 4.5B market in January 2022.

== Main divisions ==
=== Electric consumer products ===
The electric consumer products division is focused on the import, manufacturing, export, marketing, selling, distributing, and servicing of electrical appliances. The company imports, markets, and distributes appliances from global and local brands, including residential and commercial air conditioners, HVAC systems, white goods, brown goods, and small appliances. In addition, the company manufactures and purchases various types of climate-control systems for distribution in the domestic and foreign markets, through a manufacturing plant it operates in cooperation with Bosch.

Electra CP is the market leader in Israel’s air conditioning sector with a market share of 42%, selling more than 300,000 units per annum, according to CofaceBDi.

=== Electric retail ===
The company operates the Mahsanei Hashmal and Shekem Electric electric consumer products retail chains, with a combined 70 branches nationwide in Israel.

=== Food ===
The company acquired 35.5% of the shares of Yeinot Bitan, in May 2021, making it the de facto controlling shareholder of this retail food chain. The chain operates 151 branches under the brands “Yeinot Bitan,” “Mega,” and “Shuk Mehadrin” across Israel, with total revenues of approximately NIS 3.3B in 2020. In 2022 the company announced an agreement to be the local partner for the Carrefour supermarket brand, and would replace its Yeinot Bitan and Mega branded stores with Carrefour branches.

Since 2021 Electra Consumer Products has had a franchise agreement with the international convenience store chain 7-Eleven to operate the brand in Israel.

=== Sports and leisure ===
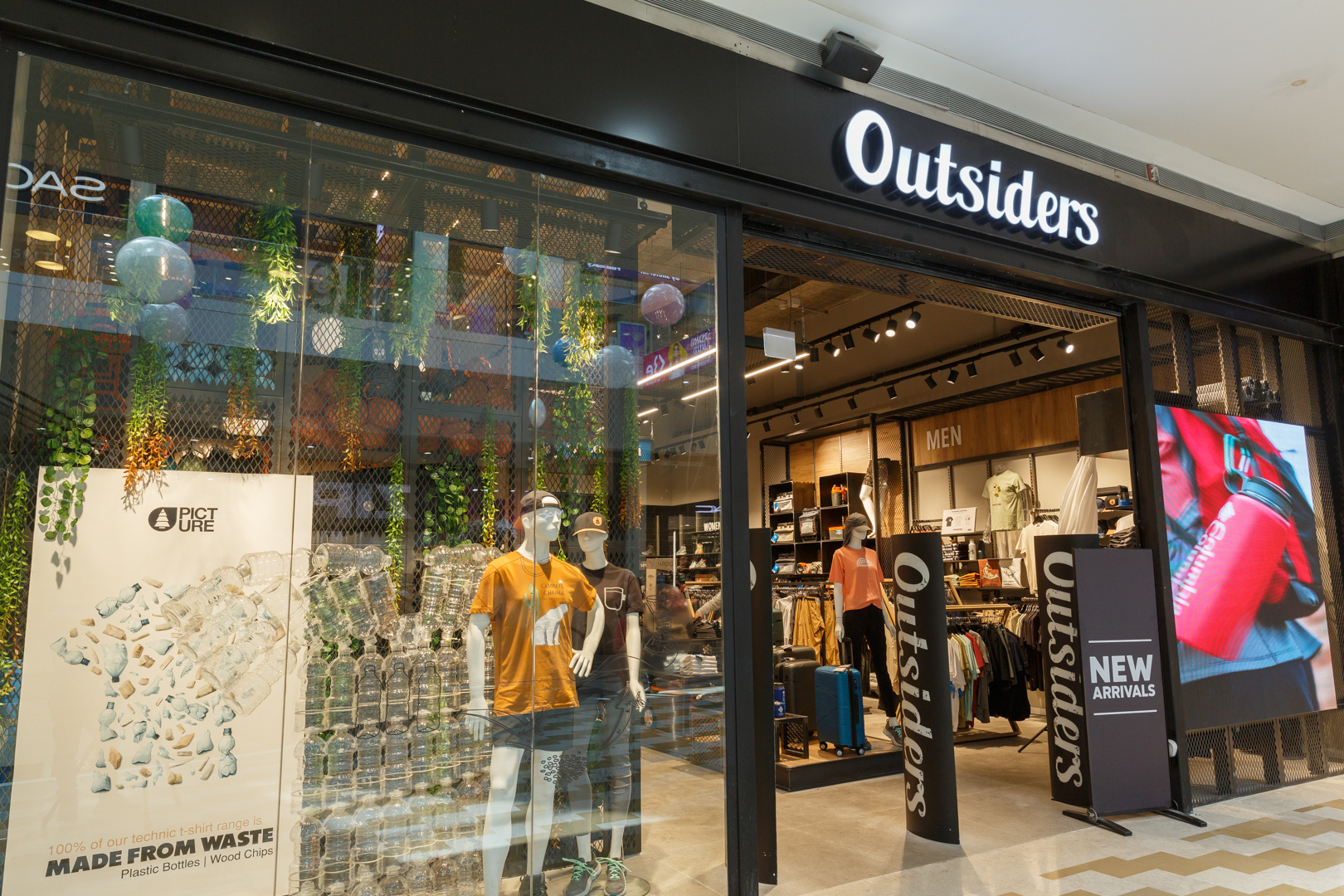
A branch of the Outsiders retail chain in the city of Modi'in

The company holds the concession in Israel for the global brand, Columbia Sportswear, and operates a chain of 40 sports and leisure stores, under Columbia, Shvilim and Outsiders brands.

=== Real Estate ===
While not a core function of its business, the company maintains a retail estate division in order to identify and exploit opportunities for group use, in order to add value and contribute to the company's financial strength. The division's projects include a center of commerce and employment on the site of its air conditioning plant in western Rishon LeZion, a deal which is reported by Haaretz to yield yielding the company a profit of ILS 60 million, and the purchase of land in Ashkelon for a HVAC plant jointly operated with Bosch and an associated technology park for climate systems.

== Partnerships ==
Since its inception, a number of international brands have partnered with Electra Consumer Products:

- Emerson Electric
- Whirlpool
- Miele
- Liebherr
- Philips
- Daikin
- Viessmann
- Breville
- Bosch
- Cecotec
- Columbia Sportswear
- 7-Eleven
- Midea
- Sauter
- Carrefour

== Social Good ==
=== The Gershon Salkind Scholarship Fund ===
Electra Consumer Products together with other Elco subsidiaries allocates US$1 million annually to the Gershon Salkind Scholarship Fund to sponsor academic studies for outstanding candidates.

=== TechForGood partnership ===
In 2017, Electra CP established a partnership with TechForGood, an organization that promotes the development of technology to solve social problems. The joint project focused on startups aiming to improve quality of life, in particular in the fields of energy conservation, the Internet of Things and air conditioning and climate control systems.

== See also ==
- TA-125 Index
- Economy of Israel
