= Telephone numbers in Israel =

- Country: Israel
- Continent: Asia
- Regulator: Israeli Ministry of Communications
- Numbering plan type: closed
- NSN length: 8 or 9 (landline); 10 (mobile)
- Format: (0A) XXX-XXXX (landline); 05N-XXX-XXXX (mobile)
- Country code: +972
- International access: 00 or 01x
- Long-distance: 0

Telephone numbers in Israel consist of an area code and a subscriber number. The dial plan type in Israel is closed, and "0" is the internal trunk prefix in Israel. Israel's country calling code is +972.

When dialing an Israeli number from inside of Israel, the format is:
"0 - area/network operator code (A/N) - subscriber number (X)"

When dialing an Israeli number from outside Israel, the format is:
"+972 - area/network operator code (A/N) - subscriber number (X)"

The Israeli telecommunication infrastructure includes the Palestinian telecommunication system.

== History ==
In 1965, many Israeli phone numbers had six digits, but some had five, according to the Tel Aviv–area phone book. There were ten area codes at that time: 02 Jerusalem, Bet Shemesh; 03 Tel Aviv, Petah Tikva, Rehovot, Ashdod; 04 Haifa and western Galilee; 051 Ashkelon; 053 Netanya; 057 Beersheva and most of the Negev; 059 Eilat; 065 Afula, Nazareth; 063 Hadera, Zichron Yaakov; and 067 Tiberias, Zefat and eastern Galilee.

As recently as the 1990s, most telephone numbers in Israel had six digits (without area code digit). Currently there are five geographic area codes and two more non-geographic area codes, and numbers have seven or eight digits (without area code digit).

== Structure and format ==
The format for calls to landlines within the same area code is XXX-XXXX (seven digit subscriber number). For calls to a landline outside the local area, the area code is prefixed and the format becomes (0A) XXX-XXXX for calls to landlines, where "0A" is the area code.

The format for calls to cellular mobile phones is 05N-XXX-XXXX, where "05N" is the mobile operator indicator. The format for calls to VoIP lines is 07N-XXX-XXXX, where "07N" is the VoIP operator indicator.

When calling from outside of Israel, the leading "0" in area codes is not dialed, and the format is +972-A-XXX-XXXX for calls to landlines, +972-5N-XXX-XXXX for calls to mobile lines, +972-7N-XXX-XXXX for calls to VoIP lines.

Prefix	Service type	Local format	International format
00, 01x	International call prefix (from Israel to other countries)	00 or 01x	
02, 03, 04, 08, 09	Geographic area codes	(0A) XXX-XXXX	+972 A XXX-XXXX
05	Area code for cellular and mobile devices	05N XXX-XXXX	+972 5N XXX-XXXX
07	Non-Geographic area code for landline, VoIP and VoC services	07N XXX-XXXX	+972 7N XXX-XXXX
10, 11, 12	Short codes for emergency services	10X or 11X or 12XX	Not available from abroad
151	Voice mail	151-X(X) XXX-XXXX	+972 151-X(X) XXX-XXXX
153	Fax box	153-X(X) XXX-XXXX	+972 153-X(X) XXX-XXXX
1599	Business toll	1 599 XXX-XXX	+972 1599 XXX-XXX
1700	Business toll	1 700 XXX-XXX	+972 1700 XXX-XXX
180X	Toll free	1 80X XXX-XXX	+972 180X XXX-XXX
19XX	Premium rate	1 9XX XXX-XXX	Not available from abroad

== International call prefix ==
For calling from Israel to another country: choose operator, and dial its international access code, then dial destination country code and then the rest of the local number.

- 00 or +: short code (only registered customers)
- 012: 012smile service
- 013: 013 NetVision service
- 014: Bezeq International service
- 015: Hallo 015 service
- 016: Golan Telecom service
- 017: Hot Mobile service
- 018: Xfone service
- 019: 019 Telzar service

== Area codes ==
Due to mobile number portability, a mobile phone with a prefix of one provider can be associated with a different provider.

=== Geographic area codes ===
Geographic area codes of Israel and the Palestinian territories

When dialing within one of the geographical area codes (2, 3, 4, 8, 9) the prefix can be dropped (so instead of dialing (0A)XXX-XXXX you can dial XXX-XXXX).

Local Format	International format	Description
(02) XXX-XXXX	+972 2 XXX-XXXX	Jerusalem District area code
(03) XXX-XXXX	+972 3 XXX-XXXX	Tel Aviv District & Central District area code
(04) XXX-XXXX	+972 4 XXX-XXXX	Haifa District & Northern District area code
(08) XXX-XXXX	+972 8 XXX-XXXX	Lowland & Southern District area code
(09) XXX-XXXX	+972 9 XXX-XXXX	Sharon area code

- In the geographic area codes, first digits of the local number are identifying service operator:

Local Format	International format	Operator
(0A) 2XX-XXXX	+972 A 2XX-XXXX	Paltel (In the Palestinian Territories)
(0A) 30X-XXXX (0A) 31X-XXXX	+972 A 30X-XXXX +972 A 31X-XXXX	Hot (Altice)
(0A) 370-XXXX	+972 A 370-XXXX	Cellact
(0A) 371-XXXX	+972 A 371-XXXX	Xfone (inoperative)
(0A) 372-XXXX	+972 A 372-XXXX	Partner
(0A) 373-XXXX	+972 A 373-XXXX	Cellcom
(0A) 374-XXXX	+972 A 374-XXXX	Partner
(0A) 375-XXXX	+972 A 375-XXXX	Hallo 015
(0A) 376-XXXX	+972 A 376-XXXX	Bezeq International
(0A) 377-XXXX	+972 A 377-XXXX	Cellcom
(0A) 378-XXXX	+972 A 378-XXXX	Widely Mobile
(0A) 379-XXXX	+972 A 379-XXXX	Bynet Businesses (inoperative)
(0A) 380-XXXX (0A) 380-XXXX	+972 A 380-XXXX +972 A 380-XXXX	Hallo 015
(0A) 5XX-XXXX (0A) 6XX-XXXX (0A) 7XX-XXXX (0A) 8XX-XXXX (0A) 9XX-XXXX	+972 A 5XX-XXXX +972 A 6XX-XXXX +972 A 7XX-XXXX +972 A 8XX-XXXX +972 A 9XX-XXXX	Bezeq

=== Cellular and mobile devices area code 05 ===
Local Format	International format	Operator	Notes
050 XXX-XXXX	+972 50 XXX-XXXX	Pelephone	
051 XXX-XXXX	+972 51 XXX-XXXX	wecom	
052 XXX-XXXX	+972 52 XXX-XXXX	Cellcom	
053 XXX-XXXX	+972 53 XXX-XXXX	Hot mobile (Altice)	Operator was using the area code 057 until November 2014.
054 XXX-XXXX	+972 54 XXX-XXXX	Partner (also operates 012mobile)	
055 22X-XXXX; 055 23X-XXXX	+972 55 22X-XXXX +972 55 23X-XXXX	Cellcom	Former code of Home Cellular Inc.. Moved to Cellcom after the company went bankrupt in 2015.
055 24X-XXXX; 055 25X-XXXX; 055 26X-XXXX; 055 27X-XXXX	+972 55 24X-XXXX +972 55 25X-XXXX +972 55 26X-XXXX +972 55 27X-XXXX	019 Mobile (019 Telzar)	Virtual operator. Uses Partner and HOT Mobile's infrastructures.
055 32X-XXXX; 055 33X-XXXX	+972 55 32X-XXXX +972 55 33X-XXXX	Widely Mobile (x2one)	Virtual operator
055 410-XXXX; 055 440-XXXX; 055 441-XXXX	+972 55 410-XXXX +972 55 440-XXXX +972 55 441-XXXX	Merkazia Inc.	Virtual operator
055 442-XXXX	+972 55 442-XXXX	Xfone	Virtual operator. Uses HOT Mobile's infrastructures.
055 443-XXXX	+972 55 443-XXXX	2Tel	Virtual operator
055 50X-XXXX; 055 51X-XXXX	+972 55 50X-XXXX +972 55 51X-XXXX	Annatel	Virtual operator
055 55X-XXXX; 055 66X-XXXX; 055 67X-XXXX; 055 68X-XXXX	+972 55 55X-XXXX +972 55 66X-XXXX +972 55 67X-XXXX +972 55 68X-XXXX	Rami Levy	Virtual operator. Uses Pelephone's infrastructures.
055 70X-XXXX; 055 71X-XXXX; 055 72X-XXXX	+972 55 70X-XXXX +972 55 71X-XXXX +972 55 72X-XXXX	Cellact	Virtual operator
055 87X-XXXX; 055 88X-XXXX; 055 89X-XXXX	+972 55 87X-XXXX +972 55 88X-XXXX +972 55 89X-XXXX	Pelephone	Former code of YouPhone. Merged with Pelephone in 2015.
055 9XX-XXXX	+972 55 9XX-XXXX	019 Mobile (019 Telzar)	Virtual operator
056 XXX-XXXX	+972 56 XXX-XXXX	Ooredoo Palestine	Palestinian territories only
058 XXX-XXXX	+972 58 XXX-XXXX	Golan Telecom	
059 XXX-XXXX	+972 59 XXX-XXXX	Jawwal	Palestinian territories only

=== Non-geographic nationwide area code 07 ===
Non-geographic nationwide area code can be used by Landline and VoIP operators.

Local Format	International format	Operator
071 8XX-XXXX	+972 71 8XX-XXXX	Xfone (inoperative)
072 2XX-XXXX; 072 3XX-XXXX	+972 72 2XX-XXXX +972 72 3XX-XXXX	Partner
073 2XX-XXXX; 073 3XX-XXXX; 073 7XX-XXXX	+972 73 2XX-XXXX +972 73 3XX-XXXX +972 73 7XX-XXXX	Cellcom
074 7XX-XXXX	+972 74 7XX-XXXX	Partner
076 5XX-XXXX	+972 76 5XX-XXXX	Bezeq International
076 8XX-XXXX	+972 76 8XX-XXXX	Bezeq
077 XXX-XXXX	+972 77 XXX-XXXX	Hot (Altice)
079 2XX-XXXX	+972 79 2XX-XXXX	Widely Mobile (x2one)
079 3XX-XXXX	+972 79 3XX-XXXX	Bynet Businesses (inoperative)
079 5XX-XXXX; 079 6XX-XXXX	+972 79 5XX-XXXX +972 79 6XX-XXXX	Hallo 015
079 7XX-XXXX	+972 79 7XX-XXXX	Cellact
079 8XX-XXXX	+972 79 8XX-XXXX	Annatel
079 9XX-XXXX	+972 79 9XX-XXXX	019 Telzar

== Special numbers ==
Special numbers include emergency and aid services, along with technical support and other provider services.

=== Emergency numbers ===
- 100: Police
- 101: Magen David Adom: Ambulance Service and Emergency Medical Response
- 102: Fire Fighters
- 103: Electric Corporation
- 104: Home Front Command (Information about how to act in war and earthquake)
- 105: Child Online Protection Bureau
- 106: Municipal Call Center <in most cities>
- 107: Municipal Call Center <in some cities>
- 108: Municipal Call Center <in some cities>
- 109: Municipal Call Center <in some cities>
- 110: Police information service
- 118: Ministry of Social Affairs emergency service
- 119: Cybersecurity aid service
- 1201: Mental health first aid
- 1202: Emergency response for sexual assault cases (women)
- 1203: Emergency response for sexual assault cases (men)
- 1204: Emergency response for school violence
- 1208: Emergency hotline in the West Bank
- 1220, 1223: Emergency Medical Response (ZAKA and ZAKA Tel Aviv respectively)
- 1221: Emergency Medical Response (United Hatzalah)
- 1229: Government hotline (also used as a temporary hotline for hostage families to gather information during Gaza War)
- 1230: Emergency Non-Medical Response
- 1255 XXX: Hospital Information Center <only in times of emergency>

=== Other special numbers ===
- *XXXX: (Star and four digits) Speed dial service
- 1234: Bezeq-Card service (Bezeq lines only)
- 1455: Speaking clock: Time and date in Israel and around the world
- 142: Collect Call
- 144: Telephone Listings Information
- 166: Bezeq technical support
- 171: Israel Post Office
- 199: Bezeq customer service
- 164: Bezeq business customer service
- 1 599 XXX XXX: Business Toll
- 1 700 XXX XXX: Business Toll
- 1 80X XXX XXX: Toll Free
- 1 90X XXX XXX: Premium
- 1 919 XXX XXX: Premium, dedicated erotic calls channel

== Kosher numbers ==
Kosher phones and networks are essentially phones with Haredi rabbinical approval that can be used for communication without entertainment functionality or connectivity. This is a line that has a pre-defined prefix and it is blocked to content that Haredi activists feel is not appropriate for their community. Such blocking includes cellular internet access, chat rooms, SMS, etc. This does not mean that other phones are not kosher according to Jewish law, as evidenced by the fact that a very large number—if not the majority—of observant Orthodox Jews worldwide do not restrict themselves to "kosher" phones; rather the description "kosher" phones is a loose one, implying an added level of stringency accepted by some communities.

The companies who provides "kosher numbers" allocated exclusive ranges for those lines, which are:

- +972 (A) 80X-XXXX: Bezeq (When A = 2,3,4,8,9)
- +972 50 41X-XXXX: Pelephone
- +972 52 71X-XXXX: Cellcom, second range
- +972 52 76X-XXXX: Cellcom, first range
- +972 53 31X-XXXX: Hot Mobile, first range
- +972 53 41X-XXXX: Hot Mobile, second range
- +972 54 84X-XXXX: Partner, first range
- +972 54 85X-XXXX: Partner, second range
- +972 55 32X-XXXX: Widely Mobile
- +972 55 67X-XXXX: Rami Levy
- +972 55 71X-XXXX: Cellact
- +972 55 98X-XXXX: 019 Telzar
- +972 58 32X-XXXX: Golan Telecom
- +972 72 29X-XXXX: Partner (012smile)
- +972 73 724-XXXX: Veidan
