= Brandt (brand) =

French brand

- Current owner: Cevital
- Country: France
- Introduced: 1999; 27 years ago
- Previous owners: Hotchkiss-Brandt (1966-2000); Moulinex (2000-2001); Groupe SEB (2001-2002); Elco Holdings (2002-2005); Fagor (2005-2014)
- Tagline: Bien aujourd'hui, bien demain.
- Website: www.brandt.fr

Brandt is a French brandname producing various home equipment, created in 1924 by Edgar Brandt. His first company was the Société des Etablissements Edgar Brandt, established in 1902 as a locksmith and producer of decorative ironworks. During the First World War, they expanded into arms manufacturing. In 1956, at the time of their takeover of Hotchkiss, the company's turnover consisted of two parts arms and one third home appliances. The company is currently owned by Cevital.

== History ==
Brandt was established in 1924. In 1956, Brandt expanded its operations by acquiring the vehicle and arms manufacturer Hotchkiss et Cie, leading to the creation of Hotchkiss-Brandt. A decade later, in 1966, Hotchkiss-Brandt merged with Thomson, now known as Thomson SA.

In 2000, Brandt merged with the French appliance company Moulinex. However, following Moulinex’s bankruptcy in September 2001, Groupe SEB took over its activities. In 2002, Brandt itself was acquired by Elco Holdings, an Israeli holding and appliance company. In 2005, Elco-Brandt was bought by the Spanish appliance manufacturer Fagor, and the brand became known as FagorBrandt.

In 2014, Brandt underwent another ownership change when it was acquired by the Algerian conglomerate Cevital.

On December 11, 2025, the Brandt Group was finally placed in compulsory liquidation. At that time, the company had 700 employees in France.

== Brands of the group ==
Groupe Brandt (Brandt group) - Distinct from Brandt (brand) - comprised four brands:

- Brandt (Brandt (entreprise))
- Sauter
- De Dietrich
- Vedette (Vedette (marque))

== Manufacturing facilities ==
former :

- Lyon (France): Production of high-end washing machines
- Aizenay (France): Production of microwaves ovens
- La Roche sur Yon (France): Production of high-end washing machines, high-end tumble-dryers and dishwashers
- Verolanuova (Italy): Production of refrigerators
- Nevers (France): Production of components (essentially engines)
- Lesquin (France): Production of refrigerators, freezers and wine cellars
