= Xfone =

Xfone Communications Ltd.
- Industry: Mobile telecommunication service
- Founded: 2004
- Services: Cellular Communications, Telecommunications, Internet service provider
- Website: we-com.co.il

Xfone (Hebrew: אקספון, sometimes stylized XFONE) is a company in Israel which provides cellular, telephony international services, and Internet services The company has operated a fixed-line telephony trial service, but has abandoned it for economic reasons. The company operates its mobile communications services under the WeCom brand, previously branded We4G for its 4G services. The company was part of the group of companies of the Israeli businessman, Hezi Bezalel, but it was sold to the Reichman family.

== History ==
Xfone was originally founded in 2000 in the United Kingdom by Guy Nissensohn, who previously served as Marketing Director at RADA Electronic Industries. The dispute with Rada: Guy Nissenson's libel suit was rejected against CEO Herzl Bodinger, and Abraham Keinan, on the basis of a small communications infrastructure company called Swiftnet, which was founded in London on June 3, 2004, 1990, by Kenan, Nissensohn invested US$100,000 in the company, and together with Keinan began to expand its activity Guy Nissensohn served as CEO and Avraham Keinan as chairman. In 2002 it on listed on AMEX without raising money, and in 2004 raised 3 ml ($15 million). In 2005 the company raised $4.2 million at a company value of $30 million, and in 2004 it started communications activity in the United States, which includes the provision of domestic and international communications services,

In July 2004, Xfone Israel received a license from the Ministry of Communications for international telephony services.

In July 2006, Xfone International shares were listed for trading on the Tel Aviv Stock Exchange. At the time, Xfone comprised a number of companies, including Swiftnet Limited, a British company providing local and international telecommunications services and value added services, and Xfone USA, Inc., an American company providing local and international telecommunications services. In August 2007, it acquired NTS Communications from Dallas, Texas, which provides integrated solutions, voice, video and data, for $42 million. This acquisition more than doubled the company's operations in the United States and Xfone has started operating in the United States under the brand name of NTS and not Xfone USA.

In 2010, the businessman Hezi Bezalel purchased the Xfone Israel company. At the same time, Xfone International was disbanded when Avraham Kenan sold his shares to Guy Nissensohn and continued to buy back the activity in the United Kingdom. At the end of 2013, the activity in the United States was sold to a US investment fund at a company value of $83 million.

In June 2021, Xfone announced that it would be sold to the Reichman family for ILS 330 million and become a fully virtual network operator. According to Xfone, the sale was a result of a legal battle with competitor Cellcom.

== Areas of activity ==
=== International call services ===
In 2004, Xfone was one of three companies that received a license to provide international telephony services after the Ministry of Communications decided to open the market to additional competition (Xfone in prefix 018, NetVision with prefix 017, Internet Gold in prefix 015). When the international calls segment was opened to competition in 1997, only three licenses were issued for "Gold Lines" (012), "Barak" (013) and Bezeq International (014).

=== Internet ===
At the beginning of 2009, it began supplying Internet services and offered the cheapest price in the market.

In 2013, Xfone was the first Israeli ISP to provide customers with IPv6. In March 2013, Xfone was the first provider of a full internet connection (supplier and infrastructure) and landline telephone over the Bezeq infrastructure, without the need to contract with another company, according to the "wholesale agreement" model.

=== Cellular communication ===
In April 2011, Xfone won a tender by the Ministry of Communications for the establishment of a cellular network in Israel. In May 2011, the concession was canceled after it failed to raise the required bank guarantee and it was transferred to Golan Telecom.

Xfone, through its new subsidiary, the 018 Marathon, won the tender for the fourth generation frequencies of the Ministry of Communications in January. Following the tender, the company signed a contract for the establishment of a joint cellular antenna network with the companies Cellcom and Golan Telecom through a JV company called CMG JV. In fact, Cellcom operates its own antenna network, while Xfone and Golan Telecom use it under the terms of the agreement between them.

In April 2018, the company began operating as the sixth cellular operator in the Israeli market (under the "We4G" brand).

=== Domestic (fixed line) telephony ===
In November 2007, the Ministry of Communications received a license to conduct a marketing trial for the provision of domestic telephony services over VOB-Voice Over Broadband technology.

In May 2008, Xfone began to market Internet-based telephone services using VoIP technology, under a license for a marketing trial received from the Ministry of Communications. On November 8, 2009, Xfone announced to its customers the termination of the trial and the cancellation of all the lines.
