= Electra Tower =

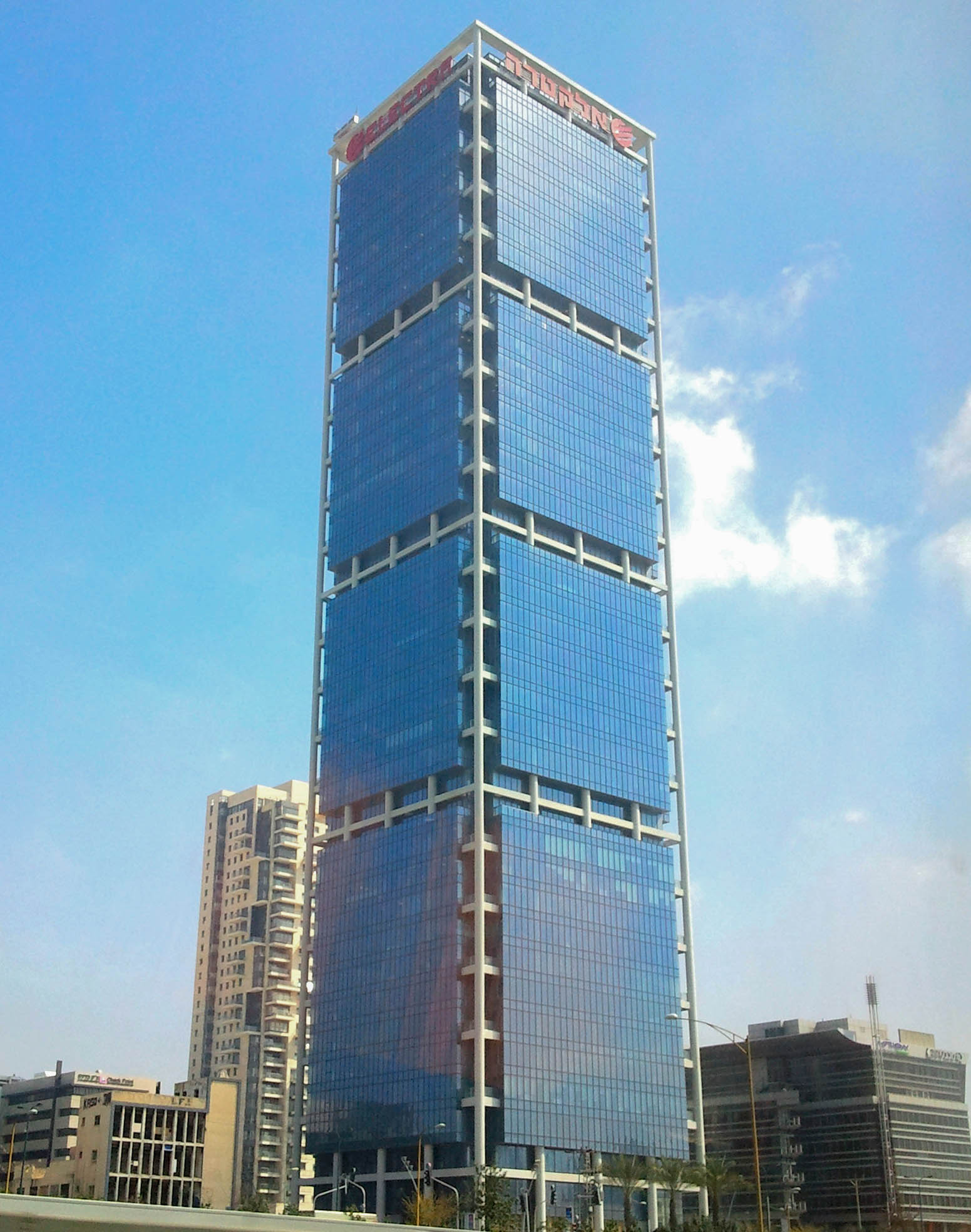
- Interactive map of the Electra Tower area

General information
- Status: Completed
- Type: Office
- Location: Tel Aviv, Israel
- Coordinates: 32°04′13″N 34°47′39″E
- Construction started: 2008
- Completed: 2011

Height
- Roof: 165 m (541 ft)

Technical details
- Floor count: 45
- Floor area: 60 000 m^{2}

Design and construction
- Architect: Moore Yaski Sivan Architects

The Electra Tower, previously Amkor Tower or Elco Tower, is an office skyscraper in Tel Aviv, Israel, located on Yigal Allon Street. At 165 meters, it is one of the tallest buildings in the city.

Originally it was planned to be 235 meters in height with 65 floors, which would have made it Tel Aviv's tallest tower and one of the country's tallest buildings upon completion, but the final plan lowered this to a 45-floor skyscraper. The building was completed in January 2011.

Twenty-five (initially five) of the tower's floors, totaling 8000 m^{2} are rented by Google Israel. This includes one floor of 1500 m^{2} for a business incubator campus launched in December 2012.

Additional notable residents are Waze, PayPal, Klarna, Broadcom and Golan Telecom.

== See also ==
- List of tallest buildings and structures in Israel
