= Yeinot Bitan =

Israeli supermarket chain

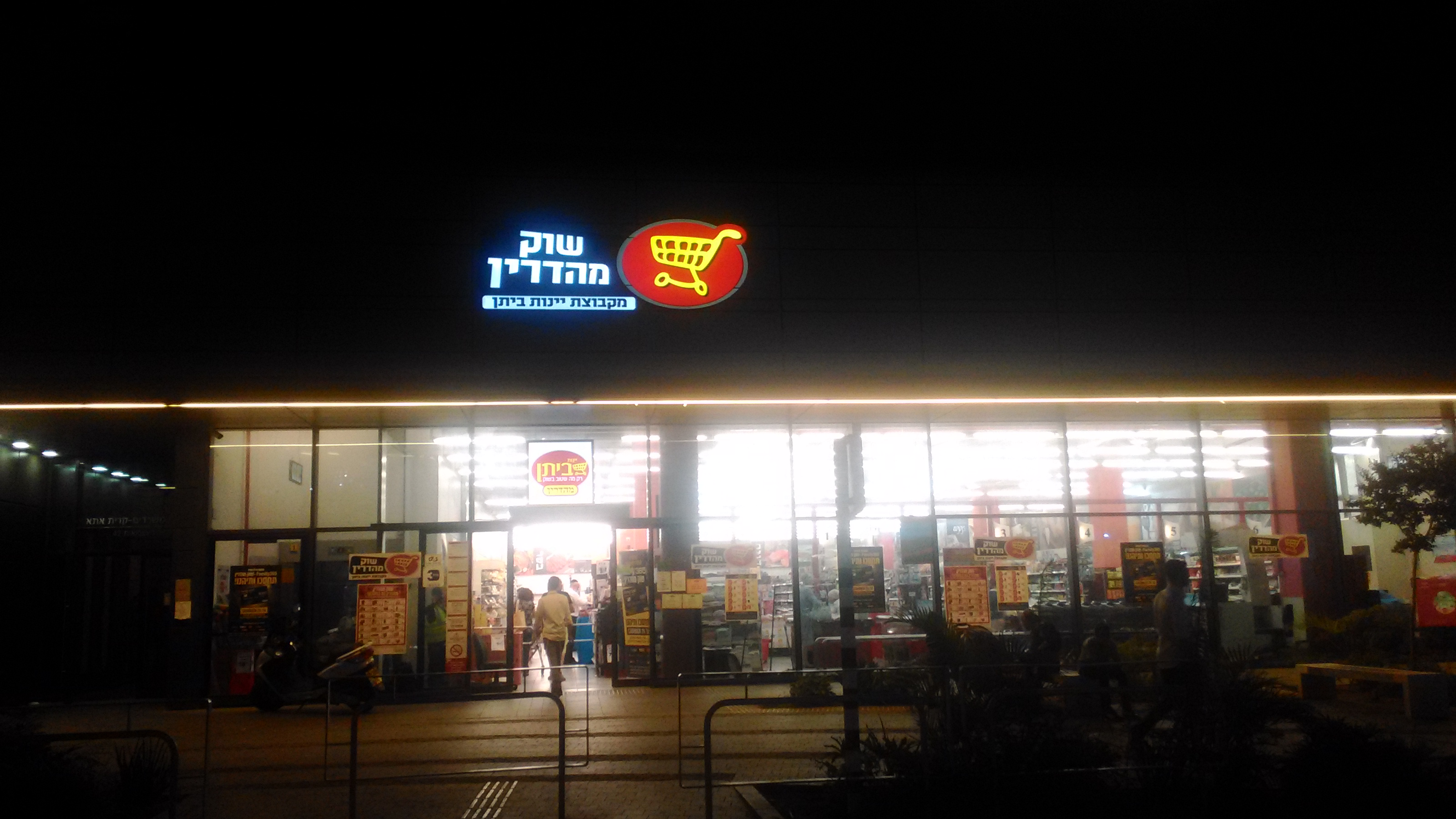
- Shuk Mehadrin-branded branch in Kiryat Ata
- Company type: Private
- Headquarters: Rishon LeZion, Israel
- Key people: Nahum Bitan (owner); Michael Luboschitz (CEO); Nurit Bitan
- Revenue: NIS 4.8 billion (2019)
- Number of employees: 8200 (2019)

Global Retail K.Y. Ltd., formerly known as Yeinot Bitan (Hebrew: יינות ביתן, lit. Bitan's Wines) is a family-owned Israeli supermarket chain. Along with its own brand, it owns the Mega chain. As of 2019, Yeinot Bitan runs nearly 200 stores in Israel. In 2022, the chain signed a franchising agreement with the French retail chain Carrefour, and as of May 2023, around 50 of its branches had been converted to the "Carrefour" branding.

== History ==
Yeinot Bitan traces its roots to 1982, when Nahum Bitan purchased a small alcohol store in Ashkelon, Israel. In 1995, Bitan purchased a disused movie theater and converted it into a supermarket. The business proceeded to acquire small supermarket chains Hyper Rama (Hebrew: היפר רמה) for NIS 70 million, and Yad Yitzhak (Hebrew: יד יצחק) for NIS 121 million, in 2006 and 2007, respectively, and after the purchases counted 11 branches throughout Israel. In 2012 Yeinot Bitan purchased yet another chain, Kim'at Hinam Stores (Hebrew: מחסני כמעט חינם), with 35 branches, more than the brand Yeinot Bitan itself, and a similar revenue. The acquisition, valued at NIS 350 million, was made possible by a NIS 50 million loan from the selling party, and Yeinot Bitan invested an additional NIS 70 million to renovate Kim'at Hinam's branches.

=== Mega acquisition ===
On June 30, 2015, it acquired Mega (Hebrew: מגה), one of the largest and oldest supermarket chains in Israel, active in city centers, for NIS 455 million. The chain had had about 120 branches, bringing Yeinot Bitan's total to over 180, and making it the second-largest in Israel by number of branches. This purchase included Mega's Haredi-oriented chain, Zol BeShefa (Hebrew: זול בשפע), later renamed Shuk Mehadrin (Hebrew: שוק מהדרין). In order to fund the acquisition, Yeinot Bitan sold real estate worth over NIS 100 million and took on debt likely amounting to hundreds of millions from Bank HaPo'alim, Bank Mizrahi-Tefahot and Harel Group, among others. The joint chain was ordered by the Israel Antitrust Authority to sell multiple branches as a condition for approving the merger, but the chain failed to do so on time, and received a NIS 26 million fine.

In 2017, the Yeinot Bitan brand (not including Mega) spun off its 23 city-center branches into a new branch, Yeinot Bitan in the city. The year 2017 proved difficult for the chain and its owners, having disagreements with suppliers, a branch closure due to sanitary problems, and liquidity issues, among others. That year, the chain's owner Nahum Bitan was investigated by the Israel Police for bribery vis-à-vis the mayor of Kfar Sava. He had previously been investigated for the same charge with the mayor of Ashkelon, but the charges had been dropped. In August 2019, Yeinot Bitan settled a class action lawsuit regarding the 2017 sanitary issues, which would see it provide discounts to all customers for a time.

=== 2019 cash crunch ===
In September 2019, to deal with cash flow issues, Yeinot Bitan sold 7 branches, most of them in Tel Aviv, to Fresh Market. In October of the same year, five more branches were sold to Victory for NIS 80 million. In January 2020, two further branches, including its branch at Jerusalem's Malha Mall, were sold to Victory.

Also in January, Yeinot Bitan announced a NIS 500 million investment, not yet completed, from Klirmark Capital, a Tel Aviv-based private equity fund. In February, Nahum Bitan stepped down as CEO in favor of Michael Luboschitz, and the company committed to appointing a board of directors. These steps are believed to be linked to the investment.

=== Acquisition ===
In May 2021, Electra Consumer Products acquired the Yeinot Bitan Group and its 152 supermarkets, buying 50.05% (35.05% by ECP and 15% by its financial partner, Phoenix) of the shares for ILS 194 million, and gaining a large foothold in the groceries market.

In 2022, the French retail chain Carrefour signed a franchising agreement with Electra Consumer Products under which Yeinot Bitan would rebrand itself under the Carrefour name.

In April 2023, before the launch of the Carrefour branding, Yeinot Bitan changed its name to "Global Retail K.Y. Ltd.", and in May, 50 of its franchises were converted to 3 Carrefour formats—3 being "hypermarkets", and the rest being "supermarkets" and "city markets".

== Business and management ==
As of 2019, Yeinot Bitan was the third-largest supermarket chain in Israel by revenue and second biggest by number of branches, with 185 branches, NIS 4.8 billion in revenue, and 8,200 employees. Its headquarters are in Rishon LeZion, Israel. It operates stores under multiple brands: Yeinot Bitan, Yeinot Bitan in the city, Mehadrin Market (geared at the Haredi public) and Mega BaIr.

Yeinot Bitan is run primarily by the Bitan family. Nahum Bitan heads the company, with his wife Nurit being co-owner. Nahum's brother Efi manages operations, his daughter Elinor is the legal adviser, and his son-in-law manages the import of household items. Yossi Bitan, Nahum's son, is deputy CEO.

== See also ==
- List of supermarket chains in Israel
