= Hot Mobile =

Israeli wireless telecommunications company

Hot mobile הוט מובייל
- Native name: הוט מובייל
- Type: Subsidiary
- Industry: Telecommunications
- Founded: 1994; 32 years ago
- Headquarters: Hevel Modi'in Regional Council, Israel
- Area served: Israel
- Products: iDEN, GSM, GPRS, EDGE, UMTS, HSDPA, HSPA+, LTE, LTE Advanced, 5G
- Parent: HOT
- Website: www.hotmobile.co.il

Hot Mobile (Hebrew: הוט מובייל, formerly known as Mirs Communications Ltd. until May 2012), is a Wireless telecommunications company based in Israel and was a subsidiary of Hot Telecommunication Systems Ltd. (HOT).

In October 2026 it was sold and the ownership and management have moved to the new partnership, in which Keystone and Delek Israel hold 40% each and Leumi Partners 20%. Ms. Deganit Kramer was appointed CEO.

Hot Mobile provides nationwide wireless service using UMTS in the 2100Mhz band, with supplemented coverage through a domestic roaming agreement with Partner (until they reach full coverage). The company also operates a separate legacy network utilizing Integrated Digital Enhanced Network (iDEN) technology (in the 800Mhz SMR band) with PTT service that appeals mainly to businesses and large organizations.

== History ==
Hot Mobile logo until September 2018

MiRS Logo

Mirs iDEN hardware by Motorola

Mirs was founded in 1994, as part of Motorola's Communications division, and provided wireless networks, using the Integrated Digital Enhanced Network (iDEN) technology, for the military and large organizations. At first it was a closed system, enabling communication only between Mirs clients; however, over the years, they added the ability to communicate with other telephony networks, thus turning it into a full wireless network. At first, this was accomplished using a landline number (starting with 03-77) and in 2001, after receiving an official provider license, with its own provider code 057. In 2013 the provider code was converted to 053.

In 2006 Mirs became the sole provider of wireless service to the Israel Defense Forces (IDF); following the end of the IDF's previous contract with Pelephone. The IDF offered free Mirs phones to its commissioned officers and those soldiers in its standing army whose jobs require it. In 2010 the company was sold, by Motorola to the French Altice.

In 2011 Mirs was one of two winners (alongside another group of French origin, Golan Telecom) for new nationwide UMTS network licenses from the Israeli Ministry of Communications, and in 2012 the company was rebranded as "Hot Mobile" as part of the Hot brand that is owned by the Altice Group and includes the Israeli cable TV company Hot. The official launch of the new network was On May 14, 2012.

On 12 February 2020, the United Nations published a list of companies operating in West Bank settlements, including Hot Mobile.

== Network ==
Hot Mobile offers various plans for the general public on its GSM-based 3G UMTS, 4G LTE, and since September 2020, also on its newly deployed 5G NR network, as well as specific plans for businesses and large organisations on both the GSM-based and the iDEN networks. Hot Mobile covers network coverage in areas where it is not present with a domestic roaming agreement with Partner.

Frequencies used on the Hot Mobile Network
Frequency	Band number	Protocol	Class
800 MHz	0	iDEN	3G
2100 MHz	1	UMTS/DC-HSPA+	3G
1800 MHz	3	LTE	4G
3500 MHz	n78	5G NR	5G

== See also ==
- List of mobile network operators of Israel
