= Partner Communications Company =

Israeli telecommunications company

Partner Communications Company Ltd. חברת פרטנר תקשורת בע"מ
- Type: Public
- Traded as: TASE: PTNR
- Industry: Telecommunications
- Founded: 1999; 27 years ago
- Founder: Hutchison Telecommunications International Limited, Elbit and Eurocom
- Headquarters: Rosh HaAyin, Israel
- Area served: Israel
- Key people: Chairman: Shlomo Rodav CEO: Avi Gabbay
- Products: Mobile telecommunications services Fiber-optic broadband services Domestic and international telephony services Television services Business solutions End-user devices Electricity supply
- Revenue: NIS 3.20 billion (2025)
- Operating income: NIS 433 million (2025)
- Net income: NIS 304 million (2025)
- Owner: Amphissa Holdings (21%)
- Number of employees: 2,346 (December 2025)
- Website: www.partner.co.il

Partner Communications Company Ltd. (Hebrew: חברת פרטנר תקשורת בע"מ) doing business as Partner (Hebrew: פרטנר), formerly known as Orange Israel (Hebrew: אורנג' ישראל), is a mobile network operator, internet Wi-Fi, fixed telephony service, OTT/IPTV provider (television), international calling, as well as business solutions, telecommunications equipment and electricity supply services. The company operates a mobile network with a standalone 5G (5G SA) core and a nationwide fiber-optic broadband network.

The company serves approximately 3.5 million residential and business customers and employs approximately 2,500 people. It operates around 40 service and sales centers and kiosks across Israel. Partner is a publicly traded company listed on the Tel Aviv Stock Exchange.

In November 2021, Amphissa Holdings, a consortium comprising Avi Gabbay, Shlomo Rodav, Phoenix Holdings, Clal Insurance, Menora Mivtachim Holdings and Mori Arkin’s Arkin Group, signed an agreement to acquire Hutchison Whampoa’s stake in Partner for US$300 million. The transaction was completed in April 2022. Following the acquisition, Gabbay was appointed CEO and Rodav chairman of the board. The consortium currently holds approximately 21% of the company’s shares.

== Operations ==
=== Mobile communications and 5G ===
The Partner network utilizes GSM (900 MHz/1800 MHz), UMTS (900/2100 MHz) technology and for 3G services; an HSPA+ network that currently covers over 90% of the country, as well as an LTE network (1800 MHz).

Users of the network can use advanced services all over the world due to roaming agreements with 350 GSM and 130 UMTS international networks. 23% of the network users are business customers, 29% are pre-paid customers and the rest are private post-paid customers.

In late 2020, following the conclusion of the spectrum auction, Partner began deploying 5G antennas. In early 2023, the company announced an agreement with Ericsson to build Israel’s first standalone 5G (5G SA) network.

In June 2025, Partner announced that it had become the first operator in Israel to migrate all its customers to its new mobile network core, branded “Private 5G”. According to the company, the new network offered improved stability, security, encryption and service continuity, higher-quality voice and video calls, and greater capacity. The company also said that customers on 5G plans benefited from faster data speeds and better performance during periods of network congestion. At the same time, Partner announced that it had completed trials and officially launched standalone 5G technology, while continuing to upgrade all its cell sites across Israel.

In its annual assessment for 2025, nPerf reported that Partner subscribers experienced the fastest mobile download speeds in Israel, offering advantages for video streaming and large-file downloads. Global analytics firm Opensignal also ranked Partner first for 5G download and upload speeds in its 2025 reports.

As of early 2026, Partner had the most extensive cell-site network in Israel. It served approximately 2.7 million mobile subscribers, representing a market share of 24%.

Frequencies used on the Partner Network
Frequency	Band number	Protocol	Class
900 MHz	8	GSM/GPRS/EDGE	2G
1800 MHz	3	GSM/GPRS/EDGE	2G
900 MHz	8	UMTS/HSPA+	3G
2100 MHz	1	UMTS/HSPA+	3G
1800 MHz	3	LTE	4G
3500 MHz	n78	5G NR NSA	5G

=== Fiber-optic broadband infrastructure ===
In August 2017, the company announced the rollout of a fiber-optic network to provide high-speed internet access. Its own network now reaches approximately 1.1 million households in Israel. According to the company, its network, combined with agreements with other infrastructure providers, makes its fiber-optic broadband service the most widely available in Israel.

In its annual assessment for 2025, nPerf ranked Partner first overall among Israeli internet service providers, awarding it the highest aggregate score. Partner recorded particularly strong Wi-Fi performance, alongside high scores for download speeds and web browsing. Partner was also the only Israeli internet service provider to maintain a leading position in the Netflix ISP Speed Index throughout 2025. The index measures Netflix streaming performance during peak viewing hours.

As of early 2026, the company served approximately 500,000 internet subscribers.

=== Television services: Partner tv+ ===
In June 2017, the company launched Partner TV, entering the Israeli television market. The service launched with approximately 40 channels and a video-on-demand (VOD) library, alongside catch-up TV, allowing viewers to watch programs after their original broadcast. The company described its catch-up service as the first of its kind in Israel. Partner became Netflix’s first local partner in Israel and offers packages that include Netflix subscriptions.

In 2025, the company launched Partner tv+, an upgraded television service featuring a new app, an updated user interface and an expanded range of content, including programming from Yes. The service includes exclusive channels such as “Heroes” and “True Crime”. The Heroes channel features programming about Israeli heroism and the stories of those killed defending Israel.

As of early 2026, the company served approximately 210,000 television subscribers.

=== Electricity supply ===
Following the introduction of reforms in Israel’s electricity market, the company began offering electricity supply services under the Partner POWER brand. It offers a range of plans with fixed discounts on monthly electricity bills.

=== Retail ===
The company operates approximately 40 service and sales centers and kiosks across Israel.

It sells telecommunications products and consumer electronics through its website and retail locations, including mobile phones and accessories, computers, gaming equipment, televisions, headphones and speakers. It also provides mobile phone repair services, including dedicated service plans for flagship models.

In 2024, the company launched a website selling refurbished mobile phones at discounted prices.

=== Business services ===
The company provides businesses with mobile services, international connectivity, internet access, data transmission, private branch exchange (PBX) systems, telephony, systems integration, cloud services, information security and data center services.

=== Domestic telephony ===
The company offers internet-based telephone services using voice over broadband (VoB) technology.

=== Customer service and AI ===
Partner’s customer service operations include call centers staffed by customer service representatives, alongside digital self-service channels such as its website, app and WhatsApp.

In 2026, Partner introduced voice agents powered by artificial intelligence (AI) to provide telephone support around the clock on a range of issues. According to the company, the systems are intended to allow customer service representatives to focus on complex inquiries and customers requiring personal assistance, including older adults and people with disabilities.

== Brand ownership ==
Orange logo used until 16 February 2016

The 'Orange' brand that the company used under license, belongs to Orange S.A. (formerly France Télécom), which is not related to the current owners of Partner. Orange had originally decided to let Partner keep using the name because of the network's wide commercial success and brand recognition, with a deal running through 2025, at a rate of NIS 15 million per year. This situation occurred following the sale of the Orange Group by Hutchison Whampoa, which did not include the holding in Hutchison Telecom.

But in June 2015 the CEO of Orange, Stephane Richard, stated he would "cancel [his] licensing deal with Israel tomorrow if [he] was able to." In the following days Richard stated his comments were taken out of context and he supported his deal with Israel and intended to maintain the deal. Richard later clarified his statements stating his comments were not politically motivated and meant only that he wished Orange to only be in countries which they operated and not licensing the name. On 12 June Richard visited Israel and met with Benjamin Netanyahu to personally apologize and to commit to their future partnership with Israel.

On 30 June 2015, Orange and Partner announced a change to their 10-year licensing agreement. Orange paid Partner NIS 168 million, to add an opt out clause to the contract, with which Partner intends to conduct a market survey which is determine the best course of action moving forward. In the first year only Partner can opt out, with either party being able to opt out in the second year. Regardless of which party opts to exercise the out clause, Orange will pay partner an additional NIS 210 million to end the arrangement. Orange stated that the money paid to Partner was purely for re-branding purposes and affirmed their previous statement that their wish to leave Israel is based on desire to discontinue license agreements and maintain only subsidiaries that they control, rather than a boycott. Orange would make the relevant payments over the course of two years and charge it to their books as a mix of marketing, sales, customer services and related expenses. As part of the agreement Orange's research and development activities within Israel would transition to the Orange name, but would be restricted from entering the telecommunications services market.

On 11 February 2016, the new logo of Partner was unveiled. Partner officially began using their own brand on 16 February 2016.

== History ==
Partner was founded in 1997 and was the third mobile network operator to enter the Israeli market, competing with the two incumbent operators - Cellcom (Founded 1994) and Pelephone (Founded 1986). When it was announced that the Ministry of Telecommunication would grant a third cellular network license it was thought that there is no room for another company; hence only two companies responded to the tender: Partner, and a group called "Tapuz". After losing its bid, Tapuz (which incidentally means "Orange" in Hebrew) became a part of Partner.

When it started operating in 1999, Partner was the first GSM cellular network in Israel (the others were using CDMA, TDMA, or iDEN technologies at that time), it allowed Israeli consumers to use their phones in other locations in the world with a similar network. The network was branded under the name "Orange", which was an international brand registered under the name of Hutchison Whampoa Hong-Kong, which was the major initial investor in the company. The successful launch and promotion of the Orange brand is considered one of the best advertising efforts undertaken in Israel.

The prefix (area code) for Partner customers is 054, although customers who requested to keep their old number from a different cellular company may have a different area code, as required by law.

On 15 January 2007 Partner was granted a license to provide terrestrial telecommunications nationwide which gives it the option to operate a wired telephony; initially the service was provided for large businesses only.

On 1 January 2009, the company commercially launched its ISP services and Landline services (based on the Session Initiation Protocol) for private users and small businesses. These services rely on the combination of Nokia Siemens Network core services and Siemens Gigaset residential gateway. The combination of these allowed Partner to launch several unique services such as multiple calls on a single line, or *77 which allows users to choose whether to answer an incoming call on their home phone or their Orange mobile phone.

In 2017, the company announced its fiber-optic network project, providing high-speed internet access. That same year, Partner announced its entry into the television market under the Partner TV brand.

In 2024, the company entered the electricity supply market, offering a range of plans with fixed discounts on customers’ monthly electricity bills.

In 2025, the company launched Partner tv+, an upgraded television service featuring a new app, an updated user interface and an expanded range of content, including programming from Yes.

=== Founding shareholders ===
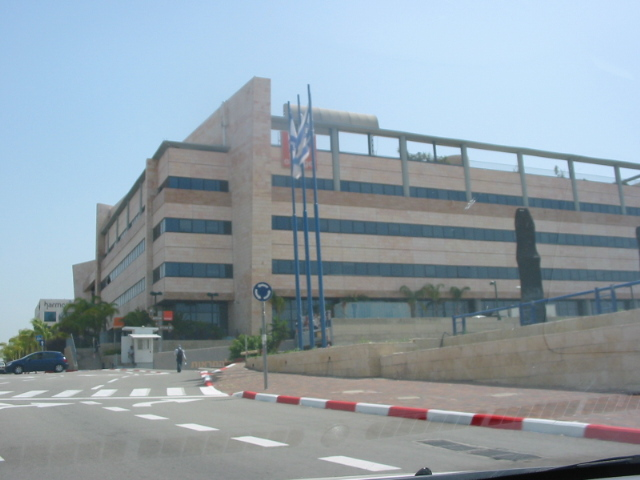
Partner HQ in Afek Industrial Park

The initial shareholders in the consortium that bid for the third cellular network license in Israel, in addition to Hutchison Telecom, were Elbit, MATAV (now part of HOT), Eurocom and Polar Communications.

=== 2001 IPO ===
In November 1999, only 11 months after it began operating, Partner had an initial public offering on NASDAQ and the London Stock Exchange; the shares were listed under the symbol PTNR on NASDAQ and under the symbol PCCD on the London Stock Exchange. The company raised $604m, enabling the initial investor consortium to recoup a significant portion of their investment swiftly. In 2001 the shares were also listed on the Tel Aviv Stock Exchange under the symbol PTNR and became a constitute of the TA-35 Index. The company maintained dual listing until 2023 when it delisted from Nasdaq in favour of listing solely on the Tel Aviv Stock Exchange.

=== Hutchison takes full control ===
Through the years, the ownership of Partner Communications changed dramatically. The original Israeli partners sold the majority of their shares and eventually held only a small percentage of the company. Other than the public, the biggest shareholder became Hutchison Telecom (51.6%). The Egyptian company Orascom bought 20% of Hutchison, and as a result, held 9.99% of Partner's shares indirectly.

=== Sale to Scailex Corporation ===
During 2009 Hutchison decided to exit their investment in Partner and sold their 51% controlling stake to businessman Ilan Ben-Dov, who made his fortune holding the exclusive rights to market the Samsung mobile phones in Israel. The company was sold to Scailex Corporation (a company controlled by Ben-Dov) for NIS 5.29 billion (about US$1.38 billion).

=== Acquisition of 012 Smile ===
In 2010, Partner acquired 012 Smile Telecom for NIS 1.45 billion, in the largest non-real-estate deal in Israel that year. 012 Smile was itself the product of a 2006 merger between 012 Golden Lines and Internet Gold's Smile Communications.

== Involvement in Israeli settlements ==
Partner Communications has faced criticism, including from the BDS movement, for their operations within West Bank settlements, which are considered illegal under international law.

On 12 February 2020, the United Nations published a database of 112 companies helping to further Israeli settlement activity in the West Bank, including East Jerusalem, as well as in the occupied Golan Heights. Partner Communications was listed on the database on account of its "provision of services and utilities supporting the maintenance and existence of settlements" and "the use of natural resources, in particular water and land, for business purposes" in these occupied territories.

On 5 July 2021, Norway's largest pension fund KLP said it would divest from Partner Communications together with 15 other business entities implicated in the UN report for their links to Israeli settlements in the occupied West Bank.

== See also ==
- Hutchison Telecommunications International
- Communications in Israel
- List of mobile network operators of Israel
- Golan Telecom
