= Golan Telecom =

Israeli telecommunications company

Golan Telecom Company Ltd. חברת גולן טלקום בע"מ
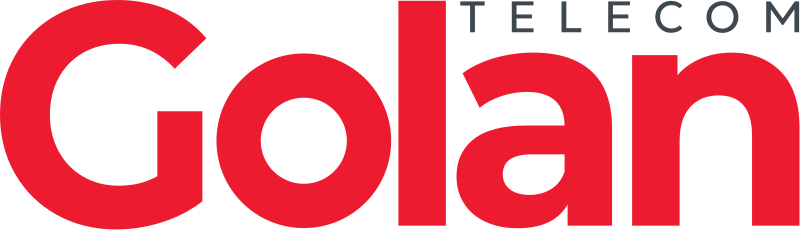
- Type: Subsidiary
- Industry: Mobile telephony, Telecommunication
- Founded: 2010
- Founder: Michael Golan
- Headquarters: Ampa Tower, Tel Aviv, Israel
- Area served: Israel
- Key people: Nadav Amsalem (CEO)
- Products: GSM, GPRS, EDGE, UMTS, DC-HSPA+, LTE
- Parent: Cellcom
- Website: www.golantelecom.co.il

Golan Telecom (Hebrew: גולן טלקום) is a telecommunication provider and mobile network operator in Israel. It was founded in 2010 and offers a range of mobile phone, telecommunications and internet services to residential and business customers. In July 2011 the company won a tender to operate a 3G wireless network in Israel beginning in 2012, The company was one of the first low-cost mobile phone companies that led to increased competition in the cellular communications market in Israel, due to the price policy adopted by the company at the beginning of its activity.

== History ==
The company was founded by Michael Golan (b. Michaël Boukobza, Paris, France, 1978), a businessman who emigrated to Israel from France in 2007, and his partner Xavier Niel – with whom Golan previously developed several telecom ventures as an executive of the Iliad SA group in France, using a business model emphasizing low-cost fixed monthly pricing rather than metered usage.

Golan Telecom is the fifth operator to enter the mobile communications market in Israel, after Pelephone, Cellcom, Partner and Hot Mobile, and is the first brand new company to do so in Israel since 1999. The company received the prefix 058 and on 14 May 2012 began offering no-contract packages of calls (including free long-distance calling to certain international destinations), text messages and unlimited Internet surfing for ₪99 a month and a low-cost metered package starting at ₪9.90 a month which includes 100 minutes, unlimited text messages, and 100 MB of data.

At the beginning of July 2012 Golan announced 80,000 users in two months, equaling 10,000 new customers per week. On 4 December 2013 Golan Telecom claimed 380,000 subscribers, a 134,000 increase from the start of the year. On 30 June 2014 this number grew to 500,000 subscribers, and in May 2015 it hit 750,000 subscribers. At the end of 2016, Golan's subscriber base reached 900,000.

Golan Telecom built its business around the somewhat blunt and unusual slogan, "Enough of being a sucker," which is currently shown as part of its logo. The direct approach in choosing such slogan arose from the frustration of Israeli consumers with the high cost of living in Israel, with cellular communication rates in particular, and as a means of empathy with consumers. Indeed, upon their introduction, Golan's rates were significantly lower than those offered by the existing wireless providers in the country and quickly forced the other providers to drastically reduce their prices, thus providing a boon to many Israeli wireless telephone subscribers. Iliad SA had previously made similar market-disrupting moves in the telecom sector in France.

== Network ==
In December 2011 Golan Telecom signed agreements to install base-stations manufactured by Nokia Siemens Networks. Its network is an HSPA+ network in the 2100 MHz band, with roaming in areas not yet covered. Roaming was first carried by Cellcom's 1800 MHz GSM and 2100 MHz HSPA+ network, then moved to Hot Mobile's network, which provides 2G, 3G, and 4G coverage. In September 2013 Golan announced that it will implement a tower sharing agreement with the Partner network. On 18 December 2014 Golan announced the launch of their 4G LTE network.

Frequencies used on the Golan Telecom Network
Frequency	Band number	Protocol	Class
1800 MHz	3	GSM/GPRS/EDGE	2G
2100 MHz	1	UMTS/DC-HSPA+	3G
1800 MHz	3	LTE	4G

== Mobile number portability blocks ==
According to Israeli site Ynet, for several days in May 2012 Pelephone blocked their customers' ability to port their existing wireless number to Golan Telecom, claiming Golan was in violation of regulations involving required subscriber verification and authentication during the porting process. A ruling by the Communications ministry stated that Pelephone had no authority to unilaterally block their customers from moving and instructed the company to lift the block.

== Purchase ==
In October 2015 Golan entered talks with Hot Mobile on a possible merger. Following the announcement of a possible merger with Hot Mobile, Pelephone announced their intention to purchase Golan for ₪1 billion. In November 2015 it was announced that Golan has reached an acquisition agreement with Cellcom for ₪1.17 billion. Following Cellcom's announcement, Moshe Kahlon the Minister of Finance announced his opposition to the takeover plan, and stated he would do everything in his power to ensure the Antitrust Authority and the Communications Ministry would block the take over. Benjamin Netanyahu, the Prime Minister of Israel, also announced his opposition to the deal, and his intention to use his power within the communications ministry portfolio, which he also holds, to block the deal.

On May 26, 2016, it was reported in several business newspapers that S Group a technology company majority owned by Israeli businessmen OD Kobo and Roman Abramovich along was in advanced discussions to purchase Golan.

In January 2017 it was announced that Electra Consumer Products, part of Elco Holdings, had reached an agreement to buy Golan for NIS 350 million. A deal which was completed in April 2017.

As of August 2020, Golan has merged with Cellcom (one of the "big three" cellular operators in Israel, beside Pelephone and Partner).

== See also ==
- Communications in Israel
- List of mobile network operators of Israel
