= Cellcom (Israel) =

Israeli telecommunications company

Cellcom Israel Ltd. סלקום ישראל בע"מ
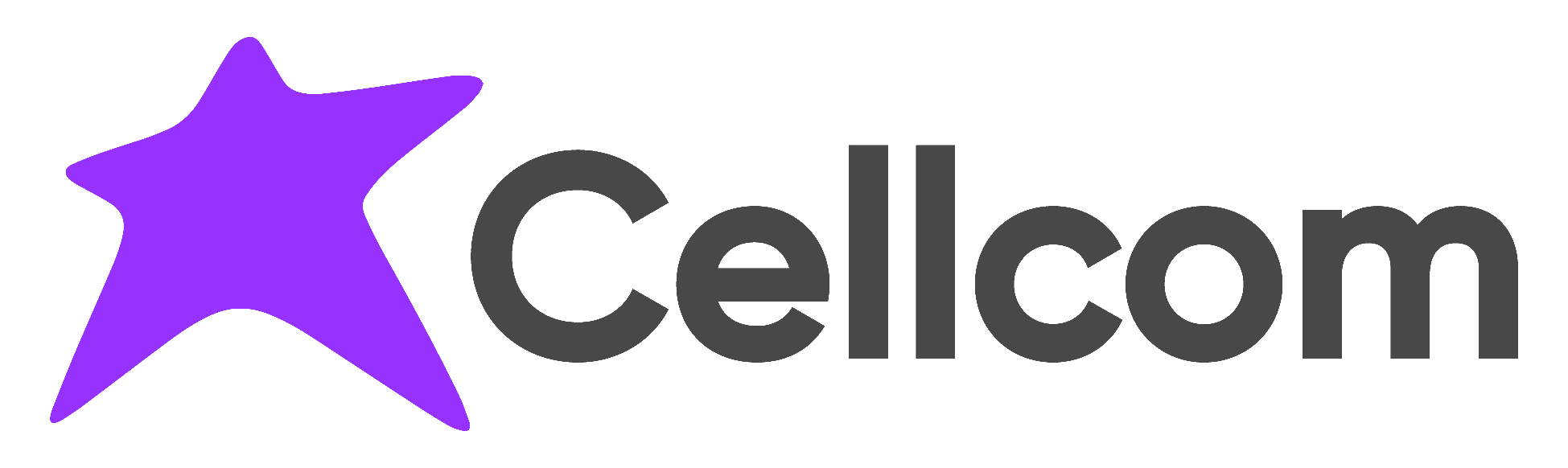
- Type: Public
- Traded as: TASE: CEL
- Industry: Telecommunications
- Founded: 1994; 32 years ago
- Founder: Dov Tadmor
- Headquarters: 32°17′25″N 34°51′46″E, Netanya, Israel
- Area served: Israel
- Key people: Eli Adadi (CEO); Ami Erel (chairman); Yniv Koriyat (CTO)
- Products: GSM, GPRS, EDGE, UMTS, HSDPA, HSPA+, LTE, LTE Advanced, 5G
- Revenue: ▼₪1,029 million (2016); ₪1,040 million (2015)
- Operating income: ▲₪140 million (2016); ₪80 million (2015)
- Net income: ▲₪44 million (2016); ₪12 million (2015)
- Owner: DIC (41.77%), public (58.23%)
- Number of employees: 3600
- Website: cellcom.co.il

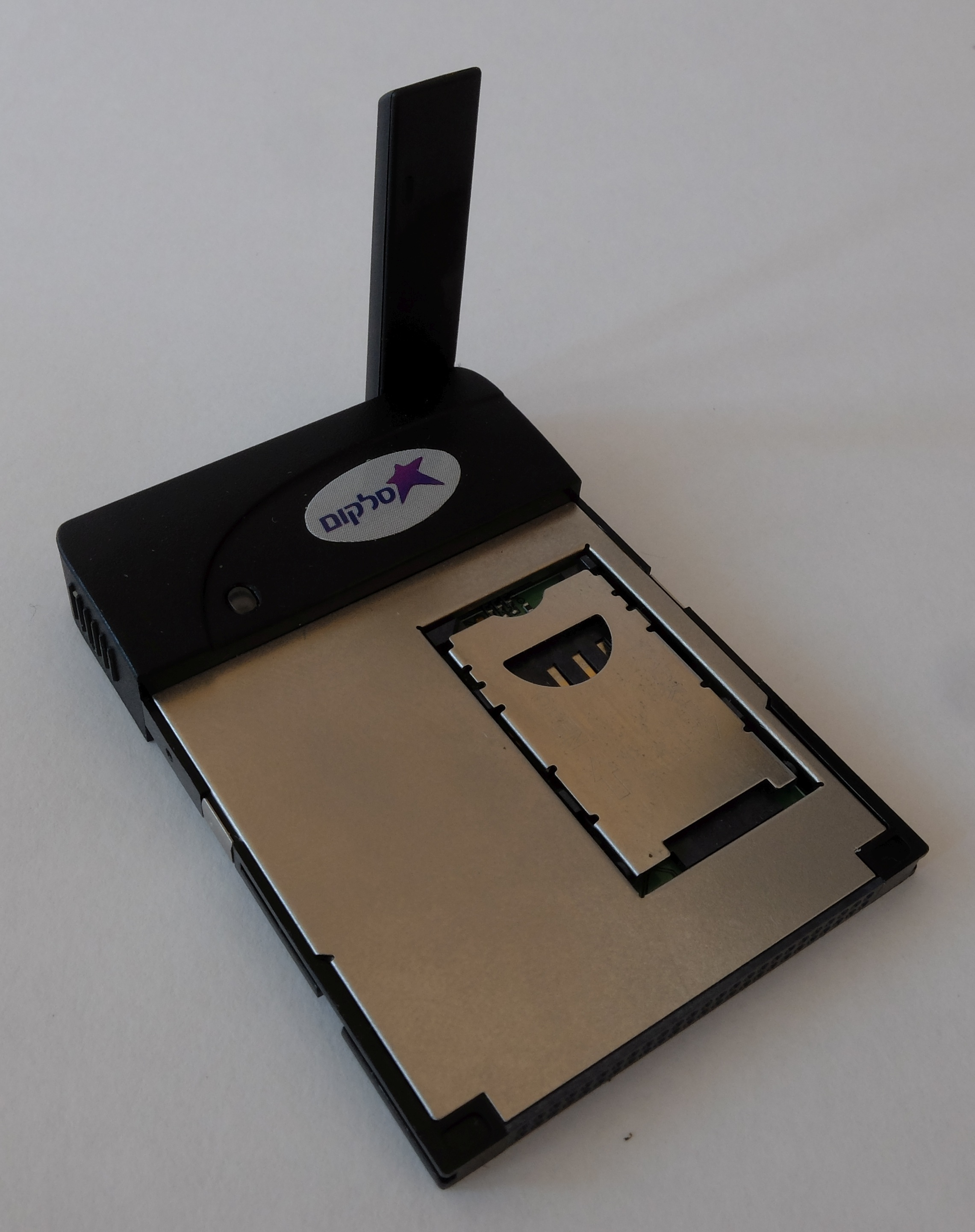
Cellcom-branded GSM/GPRS CompactFlash card wireless modem (ca. 2007)

Cellcom (Hebrew: סלקום) (TASE: CEL) is an Israeli telecommunications company. Founded in 1994, most of the company's business is centered on wireless service. Its current CEO is Eli Adadi. As of June 2016, Cellcom had 2.812 million subscribers.

The company is traded in the Tel Aviv Stock Exchange under the symbol CEL, and is part of the Tel Aviv 35 Index.

== History ==
Cellcom's entry into the Israeli market caused a revolution in wireless services in the country, as it offered service at rates which were a fraction of those charged by Pelephone, which until Cellcom's launch held a monopoly on cellular services in Israel.

Its launch was not without problems. In 1995, Cellcom subscribers experienced widespread service disruptions of unknown origin. After an intensive investigation, the cause was finally traced to a software bug in Motorola's MicroTAC Alpha handsets, which were ubiquitous on its network at the time.

== Network ==
Cellcom operates a 5G network (shared with Golan Telecom, WeCom, Walla Mobile), along with OTT service called Cellcom TV, IPTel landline service, international dialing service (013), and acts as one of the billing agencies for electrical power in Israel.

Cellcom initially operated a TDMA network nationwide in the 850 MHz band, but after winning tenders for GSM-1800 frequencies it began offering GSM services, and eventually sought to replace the 850 MHz TDMA frequencies it owns with standard 900 MHz GSM frequencies, but Pelephone and Partner petitioned the Ministry of Communications to deny this for technical reasons. This put Cellcom at a disadvantage, since, though most of its users had converted to GSM, they were not able to make use of the lower frequency's better in-building penetration and greater cell reach.

With its entry into 3G wireless services, Cellcom demonstrated the first mobile video call in Israel. Since the beginning of 2006, Cellcom has been deploying a 3G UMTS-2100 network nationwide, which by the end of 2007 covered than 87% of the population. Cellcom was the first in Israel to launch an HSDPA network (also called "Generation 3.5") nationwide.

In 2011, Cellcom began to deploy UMTS services in the 850 MHz band, employing unused capacity in that frequency range since by then it had very few TDMA customers remaining. The Israeli Ministry of Communications has approved Cellcom's plan to shut down the TDMA-850 network on 31 December 2011. In August 2014, Cellcom launched an LTE network in the 1800 MHz band.

Frequencies used on the Cellcom Network
Frequency	Band number	Protocol	Class
1800 MHz	3	GSM/GPRS/EDGE	2G
2100 MHz	1	UMTS/HSPA	3G
1800 MHz	3	LTE	4G
3500 MHz			5G

== Controversy and criticism ==
In 2009, Cellcom launched an ad campaign showing Israel Defense Forces soldiers playing football across the Israeli West Bank barrier. Ahmad Tibi, an Arab-Israeli member of the Knesset, called on Cellcom to withdraw the commercial.

A major service outage across the country on 1 December 2010 impacted on Cellcom's Q4 results. The company decided to refund customers with one week's worth of calls and messages although the customers never actually received their refund, says Daniel Martinez of The Jerusalem Post.

On 18 May 2021, Cellcom ceased its operations for one hour in support for Jewish-Arab coexistence and solidarity with Palestinians. Many thousands of Israelis cancelled their service in response.

=== Involvement in Israeli settlements ===
On 12 February 2020, the United Nations published a database of 112 companies helping to further Israeli settlement activity in the West Bank, including East Jerusalem, as well as in the occupied Golan Heights. These settlements are considered illegal under international law. Cellcom was listed on the database on account of its "provision of services and utilities supporting the maintenance and existence of settlements" and "the use of natural resources, in particular water and land, for business purposes" in these occupied territories.

On 5 July 2021, Norway's largest pension fund KLP said it would divest from Cellcom together with 15 other business entities implicated in the UN report for their links to Israeli settlements in the occupied West Bank.

== CEOs ==
Picture	Name	Years	
	Yaakov Peri	April 1995 - January 2003	Formerly the head of Shin Bet, He led the company in its first eight years, from a small mobile phone competitor to one of the leading media companies in Israel.
	Isaac Petersburg	January 2003 - October 2005	Former CEO of General Health Services. During his time, the company launched the Japanese i-mode brand with special devices that support mobile browsing for the i-mode portal.
	Amos Shapira	October 2005 - December 2011	Former CEO of El Al. Shortly after taking office, he published his personal cell phone number and invited the company's customers to contact him directly.
	Nir Stern	January 2012 - January 2020	Former CEO of 013 Netvision. During his time, Cellcom launched the Cellcom TV service and purchased 70% of the unlimited shares.
	Avi Gabbay	January 2020 - November 2021	Former CEO of Bezeq, Member of the Knesset, Chairman of the Labor Party and Minister of Environmental Protection in the 34th Israel Government.
	Daniel Sapir	January 2022 - August 2024	
	Eli Adadi	August 2024 – Present	

== See also ==
- Hot Mobile
- Partner Communications Company
- Golan Telecom
- Communications in Israel
- List of mobile network operators of Israel
