= Pelephone =

Mobile network operator in Israel

Pelephone Communications Ltd פלאפון תקשורת בע"מ
- Company type: Limited company
- Industry: Mobile telephone, Telecommunications
- Founded: 1985; 41 years ago
- Founder: Motorola, Tadiran
- Headquarters: 94 Shlomo Shmeltzer Road, Petah Tiqva, Israel
- Area served: Israel
- Key people: Ilan Siegel (CEO)
- Services: CdmaOne, CDMA2000 EV-DO, 3G (UMTS, DC-HSPA+), 4G LTE, 5G NR
- Revenue: ₪1.98 billion (2023)
- Net income: (₪164 million (2023))
- Owner: Bezeq
- Members: ~2,600,000 (June 2024)
- Number of employees: 1,660 (2024)
- Website: www.pelephone.co.il

Pelephone (Hebrew: פלאפון, [peleˈfon], lit. "miracle phone") is a mobile network operator in Israel, and also the first company to offer mobile telephony services in Israel. Due to this, the brand-name "Pelephone" became the genericized trademark for mobile phones in Israel, regardless of service provider. The company is a subsidiary of the Israeli telecommunications conglomerate Bezeq, which is also the principal provider of fixed-line telephone service in the country. As of June 2016 Pelephone had 2.26 million wireless subscribers.

== History ==
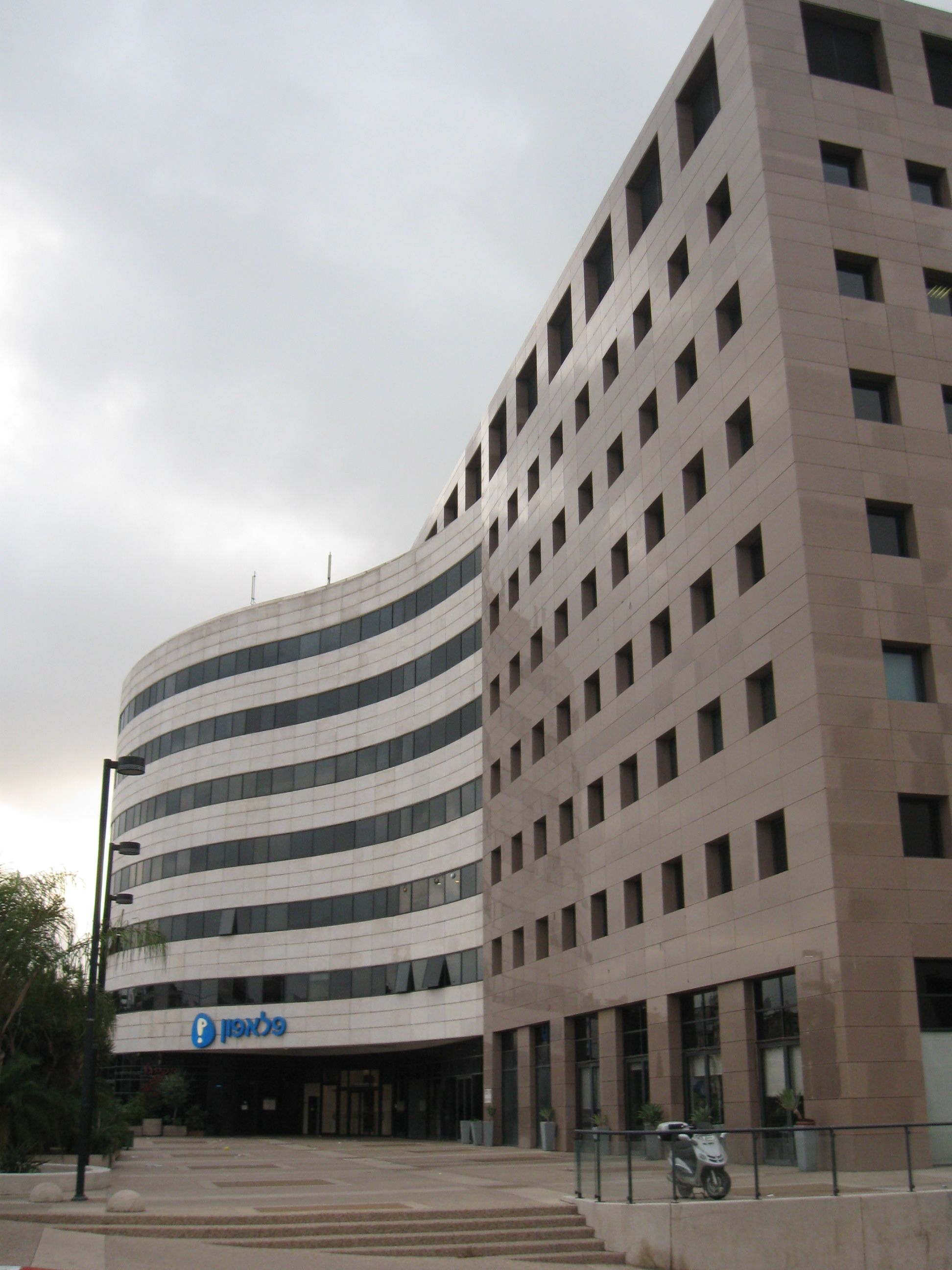
Pelephone House - Pelephone headquarters in Givatayim

Pelephone was founded as a company in 1985 as a joint venture between Motorola and Tadiran, after Motorola was awarded the contract to build Israel's first mobile phone network in November 1983. Pelephone began operations of its mobile phone network in March 1986. Pelephone's first television commercial featured Israeli actor Hanan Goldblatt using his car phone to buy and sell shares via a stockbroker while driving at the same time. Pelephone's first CEO was Benny Epstein, who served in that position until 1994.

In 1994, Bezeq acquired 50% ownership of Pelephone, and in 2004 acquired full ownership of the company from its co-owner Motorola.

In December 2011 Pelephone became the host network of Rami Levy Communications, the first MVNO to begin operating in Israel. As of 2012, Pelephone states that it has 4,500 employees, although the workers' union says that there are just 3,800.

YouPhone (Alon Cellular) was a member of the Pelephone network as a virtual MVNO operator. It was established as a subsidiary of Alon Blue Square Israel, but since 2015 it has been owned completely by Pelephone and also merged its operations with Pelephone.

== Network ==
The Pelephone network started as AMPS/NAMPS in the 850 MHz band. In 1998 it converted to IS-95 CDMA and in 2004 CDMA2000/EV-DO mobile data capabilities were added as well.

A 3G UMTS network in the 850/2100 MHz bands was launched in early 2009 and in March of that year, Pelephone stopped selling cellphones that use the CDMA system. In mid-2010, the UMTS network was upgraded to HSPA+. In 2014 the company launched an LTE network in the 1800 MHz band. and in 2020 5G NR services were launched, using the 3500 MHz band.

In April 2017, Pelephone announced plans to shut down their CDMA network over the summer, and did so on 28 June 2017.

Frequencies used on the Pelephone Network
Frequency	Band number	Protocol	Class
800 MHz	0	cdmaOne	2G
800 MHz	0	CDMA2000 EV-DO	3G
850 MHz	5	UMTS/HSPA+	3G
2100 MHz	1	UMTS/HSPA+	3G
1800 MHz	3	LTE	4G
3500 MHz	78	5G NR	5G

== Operations and services ==
Pelephone lost its monopoly status in 1994, when Cellcom was founded, breaking Pelephone's monopoly as a mobile network operator, and in 1999, a third competitor, Partner (formerly known as Orange) was established.

The prefix (area code) for Pelephone customers is 050, although customers who requested to keep their old number from a different cellular company may have a different area code, as required by law.

Between 2003 and 2022, Pelephone pursued a multibranding strategy to reach previously underserved market segments. These included Esc, a youth-focused subsidiary which operated between 2003 and 2007 in cooperation with radio station Eco 99FM, Sawa, a lower-cost flanker brand targeting the Arab-Israeli sector, and k-mobile, which operated between 2017 and 2019. All the flanker brands were closed and merged into the main Pelephone brand by 2022 as the result of Pelephone's new CEO Ilan Siegel's decision to focus on 5G expansion.

=== Hii mobile ===

On 11 April 2016, Pelephone launched a new mobile brand "Hii-Mobile", in cooperation with Hunnam (owned by Yaakov Kedmi). This brand appeals particularly to young people, soldiers and students with attractive offers and packages for this target audience.

=== Pmobile ===
Pelephone and the Bug Multisystem retail chain launched the cellphone brand "Pmobile" in May 2016. The brand offers Pelephone network services at prices significantly lower than normal.

== Criticism ==
=== Involvement in Israeli settlements ===
On 12 February 2020, the United Nations published a database of companies doing business related in the West Bank, including East Jerusalem, as well as in the occupied Golan Heights. Pelephone was listed on the database on account of its activities in Israeli settlements in these occupied territories, which are considered illegal under international law.

== See also ==
- Bezeq
- Walla!
- Spacecom
- List of mobile network operators of Israel
