= Telephone numbers in Palestine =

- Palestine show in (dark green) and dispute territory show in (light green)
- Country: Palestine
- Continent: Asia
- Regulator: Ministry of Telecom and Information Technology
- Membership: Palestinian Ministry of Telecom and Information Technology
- Numbering plan type: closed
- NSN length: 8 or 9
- Country code: +970
- International access: 00
- Long-distance: 0

The country calling code +970 is reserved for telephone numbers in Palestine.

This code is mainly used when calling from Arab countries to places under the jurisdiction of the Palestinian Authority (including the Gaza Strip). The telecommunication system in the West Bank and the Gaza Strip is considerably dependent on the Israeli infrastructure, therefore, from most countries, dialing +972 would often be the better option to access phone numbers in the Palestinian territories. In some cases, when the number was allocated directly by an Israeli company, this would be the only option. However, from many Arab or Muslim countries that block the Israeli access code, dialing 970 is the only option to access the Palestinian telecommunication system. As of 2008, Syria was the only country that blocks both 972 and 970 access codes. Lebanon lifted the ban on the 970 code in July 2008 but still blocks the 972 code.

Palestinians use the Israeli telecommunication infrastructure either directly or through the Palestinian Paltel company, which allocates numbers reserved for it by the Israeli Ministry of Communications. The 059 prefix is reserved exclusively for the Palestinian Jawwal cellular communication company (a subsidiary of Paltel), and the 056 prefix is similarly reserved for the Wataniya Telecom company. Note that these prefixes had been used in the past as Israeli internal dialing prefixes, but were replaced or merged with other dialing codes, and reintroduced for the exclusive use of the Palestinian telecommunication system.

== Numbering system ==
=== International ===
00 XXX XX XXX XXXX - International dialing

=== West Bank ===
==== North West Bank ====
04 24X XXXX  - Jenin Governorate
09 25X XXXX  - Tubas Governorate
09 26X XXXX  - Tulkarm Governorate
09 23X XXXX  - Nablus Governorate
09 29X XXXX  - Qalqilya Governorate
09 25X XXXX  - Salfit Governorate

==== Central West Bank ====
02 29X XXXX  - Ramallah and Al-Bireh Governorate
02 22X XXXX  - Jericho Governorate
02 23X XXXX  - Jerusalem Governorate

==== South West Bank ====
02 27X XXXX  - Bethlehem Governorate
02 22X XXXX  - Hebron Governorate

=== Gaza Strip ===
08 24X XXXX  - North Gaza Governorate
08 28X XXXX  - Gaza Governorate
08 26X XXXX  - Gaza Governorate, Tall al-Hawa
08 20X XXXX  - Khan Yunis Governorate
08 25X XXXX  - Deir al-Balah Governorate
08 21X XXXX  - Rafah Governorate

=== Cellular ===
059 XXX XXXX - Mobile Jawwal
056 XXX XXXX - Mobile Wataniya

=== Services ===
100 - Police
101 - Ambulance
102 - Fire

=== Toll ===
1 700 - Business Toll
1 800 - Toll Free

== See also ==
- Telecommunications in the Palestinian territories
- Telephone numbers in Israel
