= Rami Levy Communications =

Israeli mobile virtual network operator

Rami Levy Communications Ltd רמי לוי תקשורת בע"מ
- Company type: MVNO
- Founded: 2011
- Headquarters: Jerusalem, Israel
- Owner: Rami Levy Hashikma Marketing
- Website: mobile.rami-levy.co.il

Rami Levy Communications (Hebrew: רמי לוי תקשורת) is a mobile virtual network operator in Israel, using the network from Pelephone. Founded in 2011, it is owned by Rami Levy Hashikma Marketing. The prefix assigned to Rami Levy Communications is 0556.

== History ==
In September 2010, Rami Levy became the fourth company in Israel to receive a mobile virtual network operator license from the Israel Ministry of Communications. The company previously announced in a 2010 statement to the Tel Aviv Stock Exchange that upon receiving this license, it would open a new subsidiary, Rami Levy Hashikma Marketing Communications Ltd., and sell advanced mobile telephone services in its supermarkets.

In February 2011 Rami Levy signed an agreement with the mobile network provider Pelephone, allowing the supermarket chain to use Pelephone's infrastructure to provide cellular phone services. In December 2011 Rami Levy Communications went live with the opening of two branches in Jerusalem. Rami Levy Communications is the first MVNO to buy blocks of minutes from other cellular companies and resell them to consumers for less than the providing company charges.

In 2021 the company was convicted of misuse of databases and was fined 600,000 ILS. Senior employees of the company were convicted of additional offenses.

== See also ==
- Economy of Israel
