= West Bank =

Palestinian territory occupied by Israel

- Location of the West Bank within the claimed territory of Palestine
- Status: Claimed by Palestine (Note: Palestine is recognized by 157 members of the United Nations as well as the Holy See.); Partially administered by the Palestinian National Authority in Areas A and B; Under Israeli occupation, which is illegal under international law
- Common languages: Arabic, Hebrew
- Religion: Islam, Judaism, Christianity, Samaritanism

Area
  - Total: 5,655 km^{2} (2,183 sq mi)

Population
  - 2021 estimate: 2,949,246 (Note: Over 670,000 Israeli settlers live in the West Bank as of 2022; approximately 227,100 Israeli settlers live in East Jerusalem as of 2019.)
  - Density: 522/km^{2} (1,352.0/sq mi)
- Currency: Israeli shekel (ILS); Jordanian dinar (JOD)
- Time zone: UTC+2 (Palestine Standard Time)
  - Summer (DST): UTC+3 (Palestine Summer Time)
- Calling code: +970, +972
- ISO 3166 code: PS

The West Bank is the larger of the two Palestinian territories (the other being the Gaza Strip) that make up Palestine. The West Bank is a landlocked territory located on the western bank of the Jordan River near the coast of the Mediterranean Sea in West Asia's Levant region, it is bordered by Jordan and the Dead Sea to the east, and by Israel (via the Green Line) to the south, west, and north. Since 1967, the territory has been under Israeli occupation, which is illegal under international law.

The territory first emerged in the wake of the 1948 Arab–Israeli War as a region occupied and subsequently annexed by Jordan. Jordan ruled the territory until the 1967 Six-Day War, when it was occupied by Israel. Since then, Israel has administered the West Bank (except for East Jerusalem, which was effectively annexed in 1980) as the Judea and Samaria Area. Jordan continued to claim the territory as its own until 1988. The mid-1990s Oslo Accords split the West Bank into three regional levels of Palestinian sovereignty, via the Palestinian National Authority (PNA): Area A (PNA), Area B (PNA and Israel), and Area C (Israel, comprising 60% of the West Bank). The PNA exercises total or partial civil administration over 165 Palestinian enclaves across the three areas.

The West Bank remains central to the Israeli–Palestinian conflict. The Palestinians consider it the heart of their envisaged state, along with the Gaza Strip. Right-wing and religious Israelis see it as their ancestral homeland, with numerous biblical sites. There is a push among some Israelis for partial or complete annexation of this land. Additionally, it is home to a rising number of Israeli settlers. Area C contains 230 Israeli settlements where Israeli law is applied. Under the Oslo Accords this area was to be mostly transferred to the PNA by 1997, but that did not occur. The international community considers Israeli settlements in the West Bank to be illegal under international law. Citing the 1980 law in which Israel claimed Jerusalem as its capital, the 1994 Israel–Jordan peace treaty, and the Oslo Accords, a 2004 advisory ruling by the International Court of Justice (ICJ) concluded that the West Bank, including East Jerusalem, remains Israeli-occupied territory. In 2024 the ICJ again ruled that Israel's occupation of the West Bank is unlawful, adding that its conduct also violates the international prohibition on racial segregation and apartheid.

The West Bank has a land area of about 5,640 square kilometres (2,180 square miles). It has an estimated population of 2,747,943 Palestinians and over 670,000 Israeli settlers, of which approximately 220,000 live in East Jerusalem.

== Terminology ==
The name West Bank emerged to refer to the territory that was occupied in 1948 and annexed in 1950 by the Hashemite Kingdom of Jordan, to distinguish it from Jordanian territory east of the Jordan River. It is a translation of the Arabic term aḍ-Ḍiffah al-Ġarbiyyah (Arabic: الضفة الغربية), "the Western Bank"; the Hebrew equivalent is Hebrew: הַגָּדָה הַמַּעֲרָבִית, romanized: Hagada HaMa'aravit. West Bank has much wider international recognition than Judea and Samaria, and has been used in international agreements including the Oslo Accords. It is also the internationally recognized term for the Israeli-occupied Palestinian territory west of the Jordan River. The neo-Latin name Cisjordan, meaning "on this side of the Jordan", is used in several Romance languages and sometimes in academic writing for territory west of the Jordan River.

The names Judea and Samaria refer to historical and biblical regions in the southern and northern parts of the central highlands, respectively. Following the Israeli occupation of the West Bank in 1967, the first two orders issued by the Israeli Military Governorate referred to the territory as the "Occupied West Bank"; in December 1967, beginning with military order no. 187, Israeli authorities used the term Judea and Samaria, and the Judea and Samaria Area is now Israel's official administrative designation for the West Bank, excluding East Jerusalem. The term Judea and Samaria is politically contested: according to Encyclopædia Britannica, its use is associated with the Israeli right and with those who assert a historical right to settle and annex the West Bank, while supporters of a two-state solution continue to use West Bank as the internationally defined term. Ian Lustick argues that the modern West Bank is not identical to Judea and Samaria, whose historical boundaries do not align with the territory defined by the 1949 armistice line.

== History ==
From 1517 to 1917, the area now known as the West Bank was under Turkish rule, as part of Ottoman Syria. In the early Ottoman period, much of the northern West Bank, including the area of Jenin, and the hill country north of Nablus, formed part of the Turabay Emirate, a semi-autonomous Bedouin polity centred at Lajjun. The Turabay clan administered wide territories on behalf of the Ottoman sultans from the sixteenth to the seventeenth century, collecting taxes and overseeing security along major trade routes. Their authority reflected the empire's reliance on local Arab elites to govern frontier districts, and the town of Lajjun became a regional administrative hub before its decline in the late seventeenth century.

In the late Ottoman period, the rural population of Palestine, including the West Bank hill country, expanded significantly. Villages grew in size, new hamlets were established, and peasants extended cultivation into previously marginal lands such as forests, marshes, and stony slopes. This process was part of a wider demographic recovery and agrarian commercialization in the region, which saw Palestinian peasants increasing grain production and integrating more fully into regional and international markets.

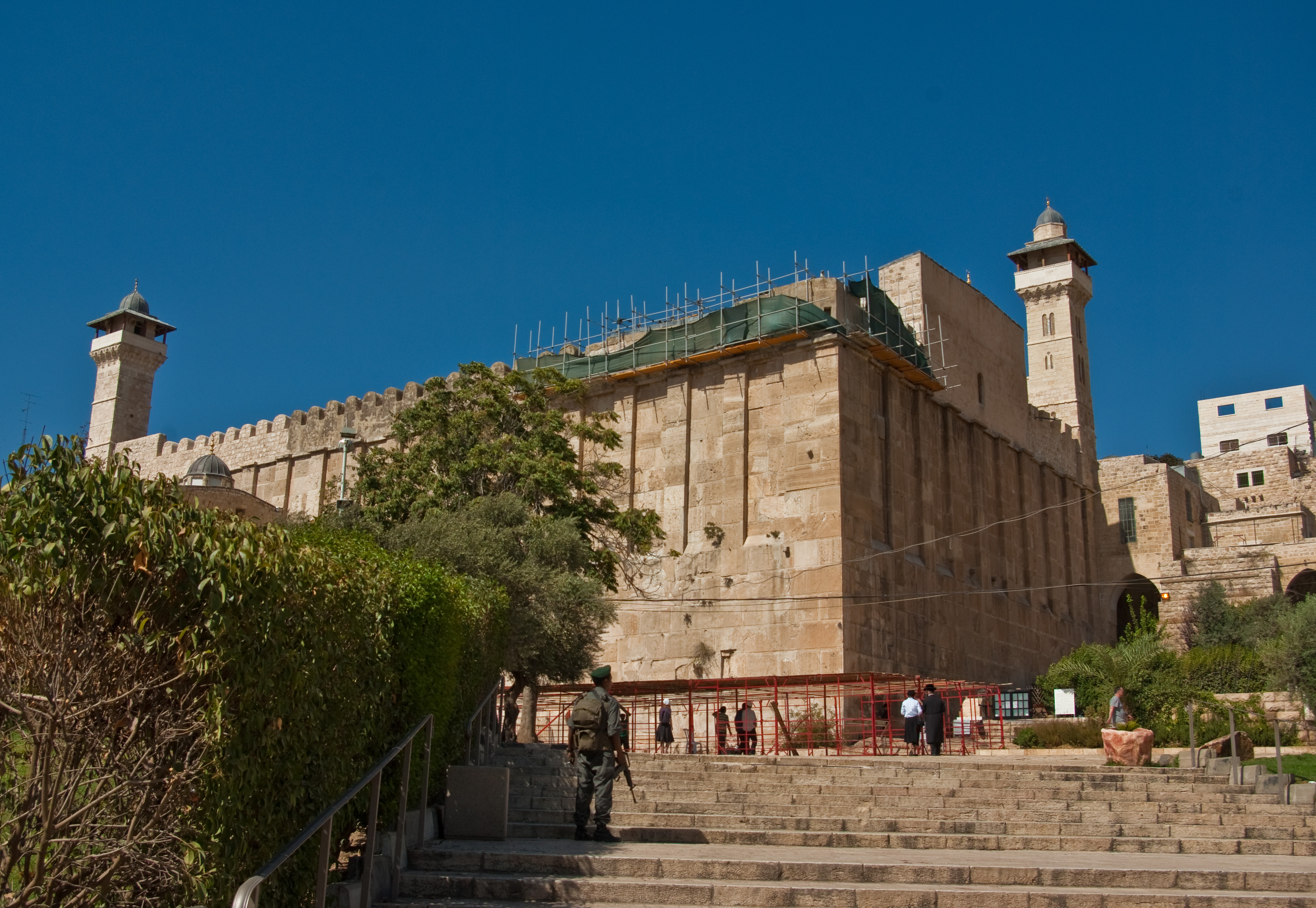
The Cave of the Patriarchs is one of the most famous holy sites in the region.

At the 1920 San Remo conference, the victorious Allies of World War I allocated the area to the British Mandate of Palestine (1920–1948). The San Remo Resolution, adopted on 25 April 1920, incorporated the Balfour Declaration of 1917. It and Article 22 of the Covenant of the League of Nations were the basic documents upon which the British Mandate of Palestine was constructed. The United Kingdom proclaimed Abdullah I as emir of the Emirate of Transjordan on 11 April 1921. He declared it an independent Hashemite kingdom on 25 May 1946.

Under the United Nations in 1947, it was designated as part of a proposed Arab state by the Partition Plan for Palestine. UN Resolution 181 recommended the splitting of the British Mandate into a Jewish state, an Arab state, and an internationally administered enclave of Jerusalem. A broader region of the modern-day West Bank was assigned to the Arab state. The resolution designated the territory described as "the hill country of Samaria and Judea", the area now known as the "West Bank", as part of the proposed Arab state. Following the 1948 Arab–Israeli War, this area was captured by Transjordan.

=== 1948–1967: Jordanian West Bank ===
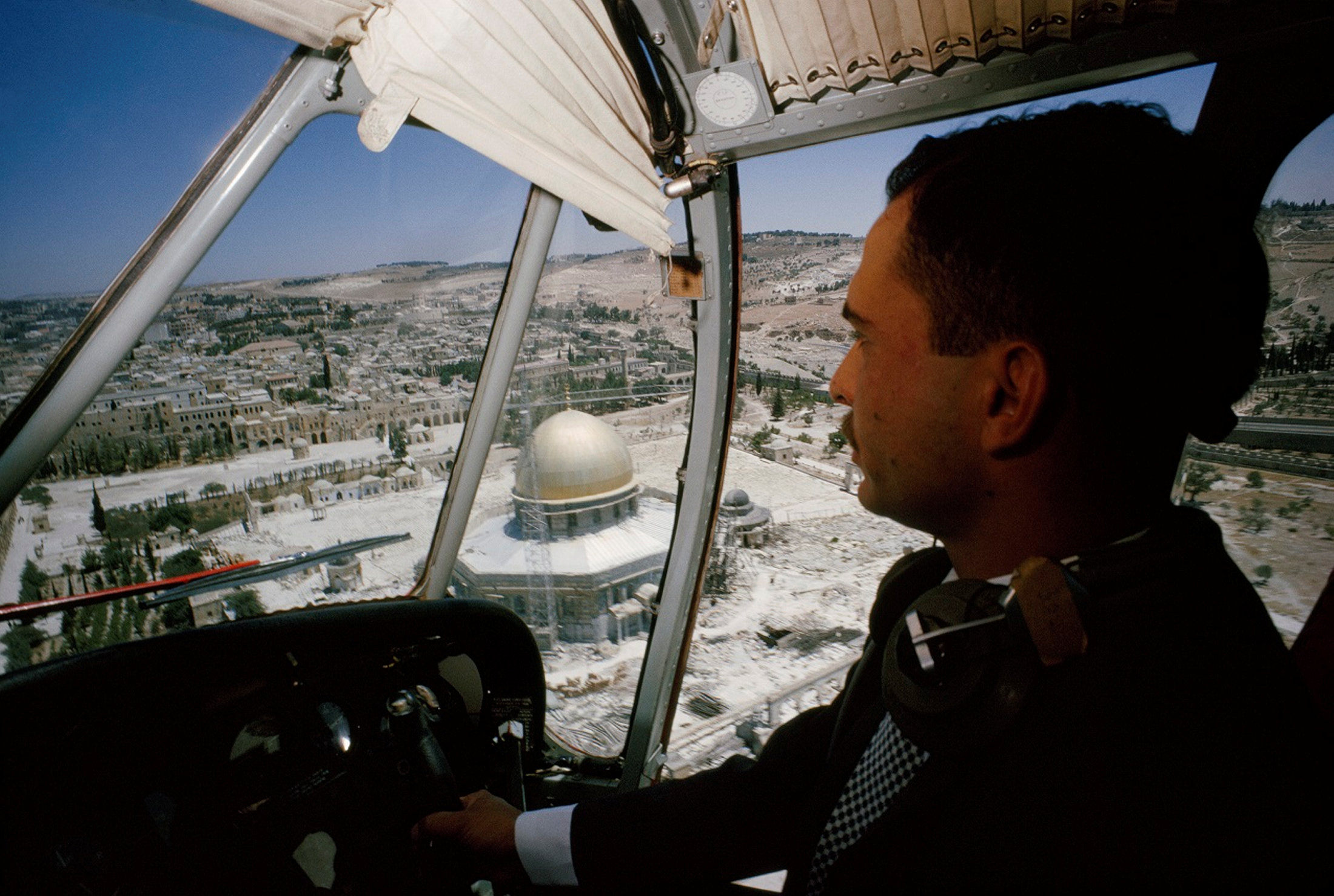
King Hussein flying over the Temple Mount in Jerusalem when it was under Jordanian control, 1965

During the 1948 war, Israel occupied parts of what was designated in the UN partition plan as "Palestine". The 1949 Armistice Agreements defined the interim boundary between Israel and Jordan, essentially reflecting the battlefield after the war. Following the December 1948 Jericho Conference, Transjordan annexed the area west of the Jordan River in 1950, naming it "West Bank" or "Cisjordan", and designated the area east of the river as "East Bank" or "Transjordan". Jordan, as it was now known, ruled over the West Bank from 1948 until 1967. Jordan's annexation was never formally recognized by the international community, with the exception of the United Kingdom and Iraq. King Abdullah of Jordan was crowned King of Jerusalem by the Coptic Bishop on 15 November 1948. Palestinian Arabs in the West Bank, including East Jerusalem, were granted Jordanian citizenship and half of the Jordanian Parliament seats, thus enjoying equal opportunities in all sectors of the state.

Many refugees continued to live in camps and relied on UNRWA assistance for sustenance. Palestinian refugees constituted more than a third of the kingdom's population of 1.5 million. The last Jordanian elections in which West Bank residents voted were those of April 1967. Their parliamentary representatives continued in office until 1988, when West Bank seats were abolished. Palestinians enjoyed equal opportunities in all sectors of the state without discrimination. Agriculture remained the primary activity of the territory. The West Bank, despite its smaller area, contained half of Jordan's agricultural land.

In 1966, 43% of the labour force of 55,000 worked in agriculture, and 2,300 km^{2} were under cultivation. In 1965, 15,000 workers were employed in industry, producing 7% of the GNP. This number fell after the 1967 war and was not surpassed until 1983. The tourism industry played an important role. 26 branches of 8 Arab banks were present. The Jordanian dinar became legal tender and remains so until today. 80% of Jordan's fruit-growing land and 40% of its vegetables lay in the West Bank. With the onset of the occupation, the area could no longer produce export earnings.

On the eve of occupation, the West Bank accounted for 40% of Jordanian GNP, between 34% and 40% of its agricultural output, and almost half of its manpower, though only a third of Jordanian investment was allocated to it and mainly to the private housing construction sector. Even though its per-capita product was 10 times greater than that of the West Bank, the Israeli economy on the eve of occupation had experienced two years (1966–1967) of a sharp recession.

Immediately after the occupation, from 1967 to 1974, the economy boomed. In 1967, the Palestinian economy had a gross domestic product of $1,349 per capita for a million people. The West Bank's population was 585,500, (Note: According to Mansour, the population stood at 803,600,) of whom 18% were refugees, and was growing annually by 2%. West Bank growth, compared to Gaza (3%), had lagged, due to the effect of mass emigration of West Bankers seeking employment in Jordan. As agriculture gave way to industrial development in Israel, in the West Bank the former still generated 37% of domestic product, and industry a mere 13%.

The growth rate of the West Bank economy in the period of the Jordanian rule of the West Bank, before Israeli occupation, had risen at an annual rate of 6–8%. This rate of growth was indispensable if the post-war West Bank were to achieve economic self-reliance.

=== 1967–present: Israeli Military Governorate and Civil Administration ===
In June 1967, the West Bank and East Jerusalem were captured by Israel as a result of the Six-Day War. With the exception of East Jerusalem and the former Israeli–Jordanian no man's land, the West Bank was not annexed by Israel. It remained under Israeli military control until 1982.

The 1974 Arab League summit resolution at Rabat designated the Palestine Liberation Organization (PLO) as the "sole legitimate representative of the Palestinian people". Jordan did not officially relinquish its claim to the area until 1988, when it severed all administrative and legal ties with the West Bank and eventually stripped West Bank Palestinians of Jordanian citizenship.

In 1982, as a result of the Egypt–Israel peace treaty, the direct military rule was transformed into a semi-civil authority, operating directly under the Israeli Ministry of Defense, taking control of civil matters of Palestinians from the IDF to civil servants in the Ministry of Defense. The Israeli settlements were administered as Judea and Samaria Area, directly by Israel.

Since the 1993 Oslo Accords, the Palestinian Authority officially controls a geographically non-contiguous territory comprising approximately 11% of the West Bank, known as Area A, which remains subject to Israeli incursions. Area B, approximately 28%, is subject to joint Israeli-Palestinian military and Palestinian civil control. Area C, approximately 61%, is under full Israeli control. Though 164 nations refer to the West Bank, including East Jerusalem, as "Occupied Palestinian Territory", the State of Israel quotes the UN that only territories captured in war from "an established and recognized sovereign" are considered occupied territories.

After the 2007 split between Fatah and Hamas, the West Bank areas under Palestinian control are an exclusive part of the Palestinian Authority. The Gaza Strip is ruled by Hamas, though the Gaza peace plan pending implementation as of 2026 would transfer control to the National Committee for the Administration of Gaza.

According to Foreign Affairs magazine, Israelis rule the West Bank, and treat Palestinians as if they are of a lower class. There is significant water inequality in West Bank, where Israeli settlers consume on average about seven times more water than Palestinians, whose levels typically fall below the World Health Organization's (WHO) minimum recommendations.

Several Palestinian communities in the Jordan Valley and South Hebron Hills faced severe reductions in water access following settler takeovers of springs and restrictions on water infrastructure access. There have been an increasing number of attacks on Palestinian water infrastructure and access to water sources where according to United Nations Office for the Coordination of Humanitarian Affairs (OCHA), hundreds of settler violence incidents had involved targeting wells, springs, reservoirs, and related water infrastructure in 2025.

Beginning around the late 20th century, Israeli settler violence have been increasing in recent years with OCHA documenting over 1,800 settler attacks against Palestinians in 2025, marking the highest documented annual total and the ninth consecutive year of increase. Reports have described cases in which Israeli security forces were present during or near incidents and failing to intervene, with criticism from observers regarding enforcement and accountability. A 2026 Le Monde report noted that since 2020, Israeli courts have not given jail sentences to any Israeli settler found responsible for killing Palestinian civilians, and a 2026 The Times of Israel report documented over 99 percent of complaints made against Israeli soldiers by Palestinian civilians were closed without indictment in recent years.

In the 2020s, groups of Israeli and international activists organized by Center for Jewish Nonviolence, Rabbis for Human Rights, T'ruah, and Protect the Harvest, have accompanied Palestinean farmers to harvest olive trees or lived in Palestinean villages as protective presence. Masked settlers have beaten harvesters (along with journalists from Agence France-Presse and The Washington Post) and set olive trees and farm vehicles on fire. In response, the Israeli government would declare closed military zones in harvest areas and force out participants; later it started detaining activists and canceling or denying permission to be in the country. National Security Minister Itamar Ben-Gvir created a police task force to deal with what he called "anarchists" in the West Bank. The action was similar to previous military closures and international travel denials in response to previous olive harvests. Activists dispute that permits are required for landowners to harvest their crops in Area C.

In the first 3 months of 2026, an unprecedented level of nearly 1,700 Palestinians were displaced due to settler attacks and access restrictions. Settler actions are described as largely unchallenged, and creating "coercive environments" that compel Palestineans to leave, which are often followed by establishment of new settler outposts. Sexual violence and threats against both women and children have reportedly been increasingly used to compel families to abandon their homes. The violence has been criticized as a campaign of ethnic cleansing.

As of 2026, there are reportedly around 750,000 Israeli settlers that live illegally in the West Bank, including East Jerusalem. Expansion of settlements, displacement trends, water inequality, and structural policy changes have led to some analysts to argue that Israel has disregarded its obligations as an occupying power by trying to unlawfully annex West Bank and transfer its own population to it, at the expense of long term regional peace.

== Geography ==
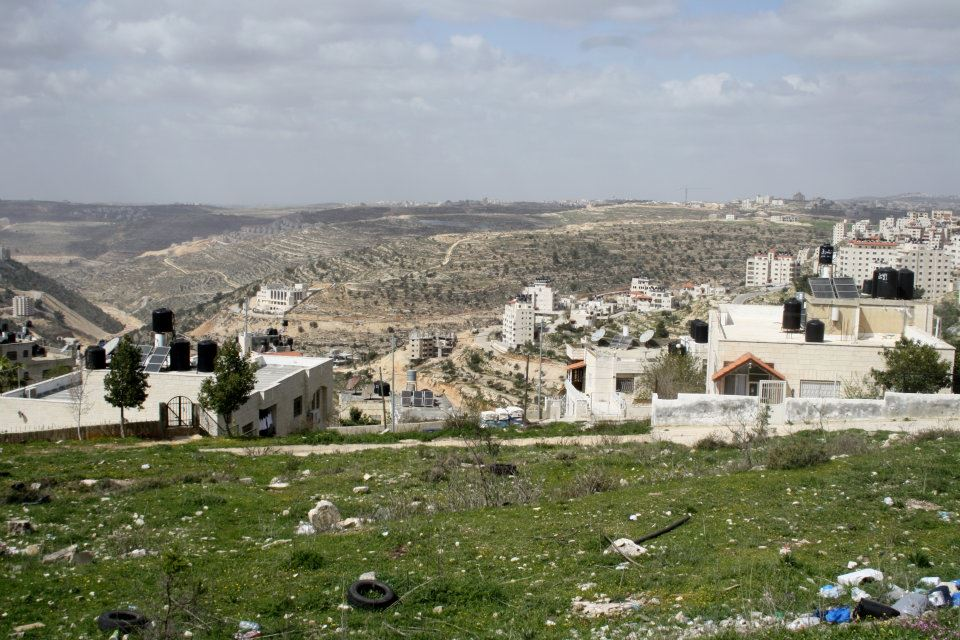
View of the Judaean Mountains from Ramallah

The West Bank has an area of 5,628 or 5,640 square kilometres (2,173 or 2,178 square miles), which comprises 21.2% of former Mandatory Palestine (excluding Jordan) and has generally rugged mountainous terrain. The total length of the land boundaries of the region is 404 km (251 mi). The terrain is mostly rugged dissected upland, some vegetation in the west, but somewhat barren in the east. The elevation span between the shoreline of the Dead Sea at −408 m to the highest point at Mount Nabi Yunis, at 1,030 m (3,379 ft) above sea level. The West Bank is landlocked; its highlands are the main recharge area for Israel's coastal aquifers.

The West Bank has 220 km^{2} (85 sq mi) of water area, consisting of the northwestern quarter of the Dead Sea.

There are few natural resources in the area except the highly arable land, which comprises 27% of the land area of the region. It is mostly used as permanent pastures (32% of arable land) and seasonal agricultural uses (40%). Forests and woodland comprise just 1%, with no permanent crops.

=== Climate ===
The climate in the West Bank is mostly Mediterranean, slightly cooler at elevated areas compared with the shoreline, west to the area. In the east, the West Bank includes the Judean Desert and the shoreline of the Dead Sea – both with dry and hot climate.

In the most highly elevated areas in the northwest, annual rainfall is more than 27 inches (685 mm). This declines in the southwest and southeast to less than 4 inches (100 mm). Hilly terrains are used for sheep grazing and cultivating olives, cereals, and fruits. The Jordan River valley is also cultivated for various fruits and vegetables.

== Government and politics ==
=== Political administration ===
Overview of administration and sovereignty in Israel, the Palestinian territories and the Golan Heights
Area		Administered by	Recognition of governing authority	Sovereignty claimed by	Recognition of claim
Gaza Strip		Palestinian National Authority (de jure) Controlled by Hamas (de facto)	Witnesses to the Oslo II Accord	Palestine	157 UN member states
West Bank	Palestinian enclaves (Areas A and B)	Palestinian National Authority and Israeli military	Witnesses to the Oslo II Accord	Palestine	157 UN member states
West Bank	Area C	Israeli enclave law (Israeli settlements) and Israeli military (Palestinians under Israeli occupation)	Witnesses to the Oslo II Accord	Palestine	157 UN member states
West Bank	East Jerusalem	Israeli administration	Honduras, Guatemala, Nauru, and the United States	Palestine	China, Russia
West Jerusalem		Israeli administration	Russia, Czech Republic, Honduras, Guatemala, Nauru, and the United States	United Nations as an international city along with East Jerusalem	Various UN member states and the European Union; joint sovereignty also widely supported
Golan Heights		Israeli administration	United States and Colombia	Syria	All UN member states except the United States and Colombia
Israel (Green Line border)		Israeli administration	165 UN member states	Israel	165 UN member states

==== Palestinian enclaves ====
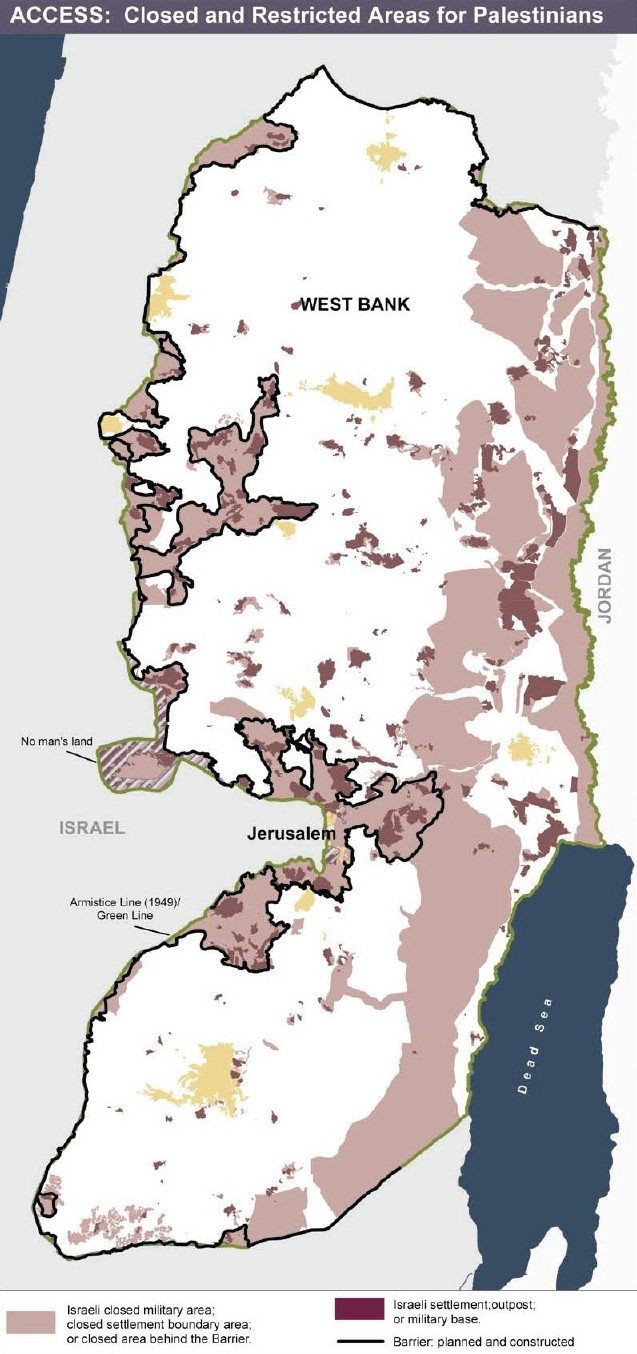
A map of West Bank settlements and closures in January 2006: Yellow = Palestinian urban centres. Light pink = closed military areas or settlement boundary areas or areas isolated by the Israeli West Bank barrier; dark pink = settlements, outposts or military bases. The black line = route of the Barrier

The 1993 Oslo Accords declared the final status of the West Bank to be subject to a forthcoming settlement between Israel and the Palestinian leadership. Following these interim accords, Israel withdrew its military rule from some parts of the West Bank, which was divided into three areas:

Area	Security	Civil Admin	% of WB land	% of WB Palestinians
A	Palestinian	Palestinian	18%	55%
B	Israeli	Palestinian	21%	41%
C	Israeli	Israeli	61%	4%

Area A, originally ~3% of the West Bank under full civil control of the Palestinian Authority, comprises Palestinian towns and some rural areas away from Israeli settlements in the north (between Jenin, Nablus, Tubas, and Tulkarm), the south (around Hebron), and one in the centre south of Salfit. Area B, 25.2% of the area of the territory, adds what was the contemporary populated rural areas, many closer to the centre of the West Bank. Area C contains all the Israeli settlements (excluding settlements in East Jerusalem), roads that afford access to the settlements, buffer zones (near settlements, roads, strategic areas, and Israel), and almost all of the Jordan Valley and the Judean Desert.

Areas A and B are themselves divided among 227 separate areas (199 of which are smaller than 2 km^{2} (1 sq mi)) that are separated from one another by Israeli-controlled Area C. Areas A, B, and C cross the 11 governorates used as administrative divisions by the Palestinian National Authority, Israel, and the IDF and named after major cities. The mainly open areas of Area C, which contains all of the basic resources of arable and building land, water springs, quarries, and sites of touristic value needed to develop a viable Palestinian state, were to be handed over to the Palestinians by 1999 under the Oslo Accords as part of a final status agreement. This agreement was never achieved.

According to B'tselem, while the vast majority of the Palestinian population lives in areas A and B, the vacant land available for construction in dozens of villages and towns across the West Bank is situated on the margins of the communities and defined as area C. Less than 1% of area C is designated for use by Palestinians, who are also unable to legally build in their own existing villages in area C due to Israeli authorities' restrictions.

An assessment by the UN Office for the Coordination of Humanitarian Affairs in 2007 found that approximately 40% of the West Bank was taken up by Israeli infrastructure. The infrastructure, consisting of settlements, the barrier, military bases and closed military areas, Israeli-declared nature reserves, and the roads that accompany them is off-limits or tightly controlled to Palestinians.

In June 2011, the Independent Commission for Human Rights published a report that found that Palestinians in the West Bank and the Gaza Strip were subjected in 2010 to an "almost systematic campaign" of human rights abuse by the Palestinian Authority and Hamas, as well as by Israeli authorities, with the security forces of the PA and Hamas being responsible for torture, arrests, and arbitrary detentions.

==== Area annexed by Israel ====
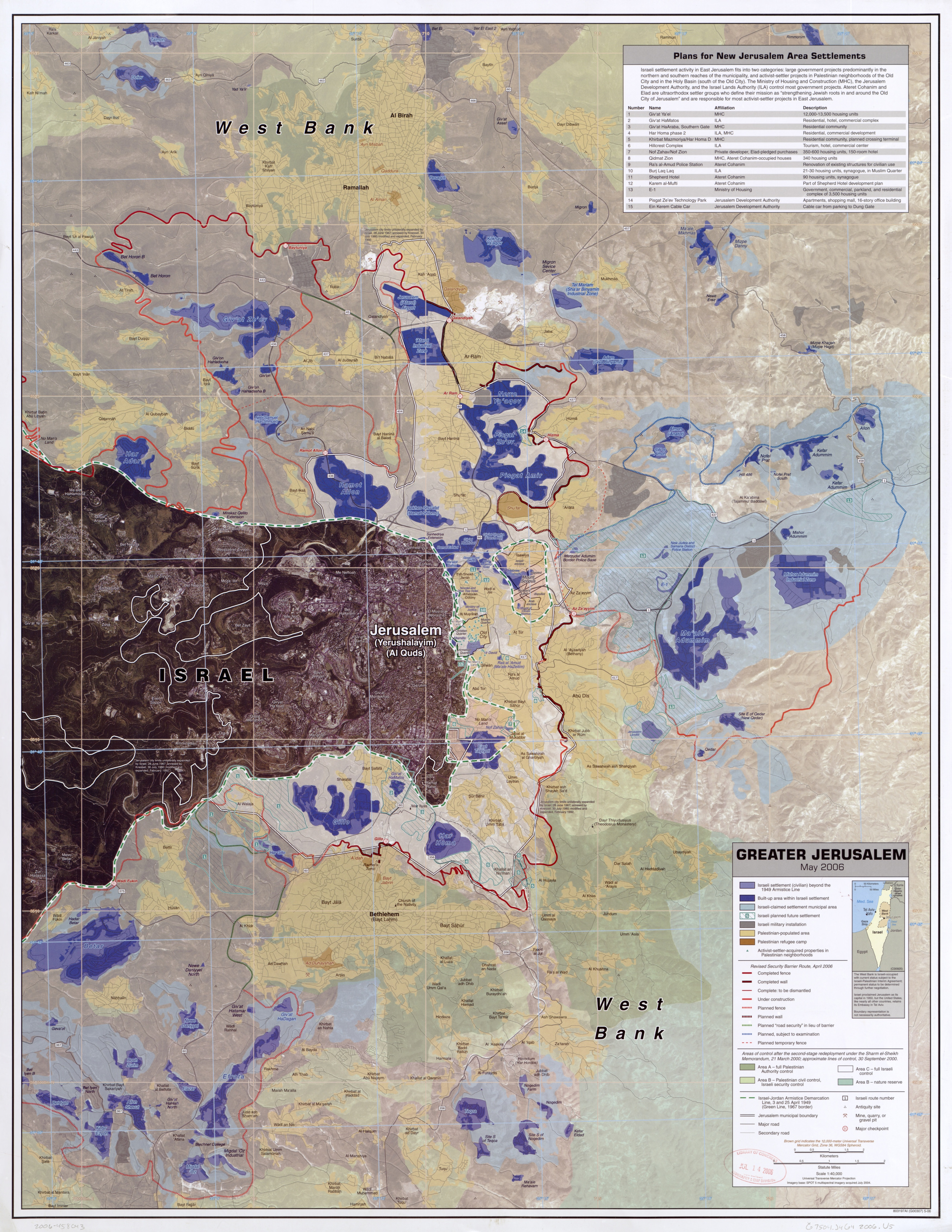
Greater Jerusalem, May 2006. CIA remote sensing map showing areas considered settlements, plus refugee camps, fences, walls, etc.

Through the Jerusalem Law, Israel extended its administrative control over East Jerusalem. This has often been interpreted as tantamount to an official annexation, though Ian Lustick, in reviewing the legal status of Israeli measures, has argued that no such annexation ever took place. The Palestinian residents have legal permanent residency status. Rejecting the Jerusalem Law, the UN Security Council passed UN Security Council Resolution 478, declaring that the law was "null and void". Although permanent residents are permitted, if they wish, to receive Israeli citizenship if they meet certain conditions including swearing allegiance to the State and renouncing any other citizenship, most Palestinians did not apply for Israeli citizenship for political reasons. There are various possible reasons as to why the West Bank had not been annexed to Israel after its capture in 1967. The government of Israel has not formally confirmed an official reason; however, historians and analysts have established a variety of such, most of them demographic. Among those most commonly cited have been:

- Reluctance to award its citizenship to an overwhelming number of a potentially hostile population whose allies were sworn to the destruction of Israel.
- To ultimately exchange land for peace with neighbouring states
- Fear that the population of ethnic Arabs, including Israeli citizens of Palestinian ethnicity, would outnumber the Jewish Israelis west of the Jordan River.
- The disputed legality of annexation under the Fourth Geneva Convention

The importance of demographic concerns to some significant figures in Israel's leadership was illustrated when Avraham Burg, a former Knesset Speaker and former chair of the Jewish Agency for Israel, wrote in The Guardian in September 2003,

"Between the Jordan and the Mediterranean there is no longer a clear Jewish majority. And so, fellow citizens, it is not possible to keep the whole thing without paying a price. We cannot keep a Palestinian majority under an Israeli boot and at the same time think ourselves the only democracy in the Middle East. There cannot be democracy without equal rights for all who live here, Arab as well as Jew. We cannot keep the territories and preserve a Jewish majority in the world's only Jewish state – not by means that are humane and moral and Jewish."

==== Area C and Israeli settlements ====
Map of Israeli settlements and Area C (magenta and blue), 2023

As of 2022, there are over 450,000 Israeli settlers living in 132 Israeli settlements in the West Bank excluding East Jerusalem, with an additional 220,000 Jewish settlers residing in 12 settlements in East Jerusalem. In addition, there are over 140 Israeli outposts in the West Bank that are not recognized and are therefore illegal even under Israeli law, but which have nevertheless been provided with infrastructure, water, sewage, and other services by the authorities. They are colloquially known as "illegal outposts".

As a result of the application of Israeli law in the settlements ("Enclave law"), large portions of Israeli civil law are applied to Israeli settlements and to Israelis living in the Israeli-occupied territories.

The international consensus is that all Israeli settlements on the West Bank are illegal under international law. In 2002, the European Union as a whole found all Israeli settlement activities to be illegal. Significant portions of the Israeli public similarly oppose the continuing presence of Jewish Israelis in the West Bank and have supported the 2005 settlement relocation. The majority of legal scholars hold the settlements to violate international law; however, some others, including Julius Stone, Eugene Rostow, and Eugene Kontorovich, have argued that they are legal under international law.

Immediately after the 1967 war, Theodor Meron, legal counsellor of Israel's Foreign Ministry, advised Israeli ministers in a "top secret" memo that any policy of building settlements across occupied territories violated international law and would "contravene the explicit provisions of the Fourth Geneva Convention". Fifty years later, citing decades of legal scholarship on the subject, Meron reiterated his legal opinion regarding the illegality of Israeli settlements in the occupied territories.

The UN Security Council has issued several non-binding resolutions addressing the issue of the settlements. Typical of these is UN Security Council resolution 446 which states that the "practices of Israel in establishing settlements in the Palestinian and other Arab territories occupied since 1967 have no legal validity", and it calls on Israel "as the occupying Power, to abide scrupulously by the 1949 Fourth Geneva Convention".

In the 1970s, Israel poisoned Palestinian land in the West Bank so they could establish Israeli settlements.

The Conference of High Contracting Parties to the Fourth Geneva Convention held in Geneva on 5 December 2001 called upon "the Occupying Power to fully and effectively respect the Fourth Geneva Convention in the Occupied Palestinian Territory, including East Jerusalem, and to refrain from perpetrating any violation of the Convention." The High Contracting Parties reaffirmed "the illegality of the settlements in the said territories and of the extension thereof."

On 30 December 2007, Israeli Prime Minister Ehud Olmert issued an order requiring approval by both the Israeli Prime Minister and Israeli Defense Minister of all settlement activities (including planning) in the West Bank. The change had little effect with settlements continuing to expand, and new ones being established. On 31 August 2014, Israel announced it was appropriating 400 hectares of land in the West Bank to eventually house 1,000 Israel families. The appropriation was described as the largest in more than 30 years. According to reports on Israel Radio, the development is a response to the 2014 kidnapping and murder of Israeli teenagers.

in February 2026, the Israeli government approved a plan to designate lands in Area C of the West Bank as state property, aiming to strengthen administrative control over settlements and their surrounding regions. The initiative includes mapping both privately owned and state lands, introducing new regulatory systems, and incorporating municipal oversight to support infrastructure development and governance within the settlements. Israel's designation of specific regions within the West Bank as state property has generated extensive criticism, with allegations that this action contravenes established international legal standards, notably the Fourth Geneva Convention, which forbids changes to the status of occupied territories. Palestinian authorities and human rights proponents regard this action as a de facto annexation that diminishes the viability of a two-state resolution. Legal scholars highlight that unilateral land registration and regulatory interventions in occupied territories contravene recognized international legal norms and may contribute to the intensification of regional tensions.

==== Palestinian outposts ====
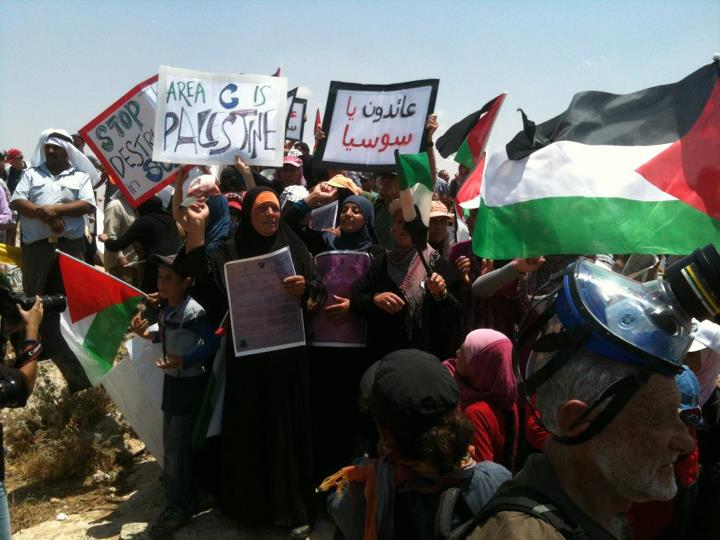
A Palestinian demonstration against the demolition of the village Susya

In December 2005, Haaretz reported about the demolition of "Palestinian outposts" in Bil'in. The demolitions sparked a political debate as according to PeaceNow it was a double standard ("After what happened today in Bil'in, there is no reason that the state should defend its decision to continue the construction" credited to Michael Sfard).

In January 2012, the European Union approved the "Area C and Palestinian state building" report. The report said Palestinian presence in Area C has been continuously undermined by Israel and that state building efforts in Area C of the Palestinian Authority (PA) and the EU were of "utmost importance in order to support the creation of a contiguous and viable Palestinian state". The EU will support various projects to "support the Palestinian people and help maintain their presence".

In May 2012, a petition was filed to the Israeli Supreme Court contesting the legality of more 15 Palestinian outposts and Palestinian building in "Area C". The cases were filed by pro-settler Israeli organization Regavim.

Ynet News reported on 11 January 2013 that a group of 200 Palestinians created an outpost named Bab al-Shams ("Gate of the Sun"), containing 50 tents, in protest of Israeli's plans to build more than 3,000 housing units there. The camp was evicted by Israel forces after only two days, and subsequently bulldozed.

A week later, Palestinian activists built another outpost, which they named Bab al-Karamah ("Gate of Digny") in the Palestinian village of Beit Iksa, near Jerusalem, where Israel planned to construct part of the separation fence. This output was also destroyed by Israeli troops.

==== West Bank barrier ====
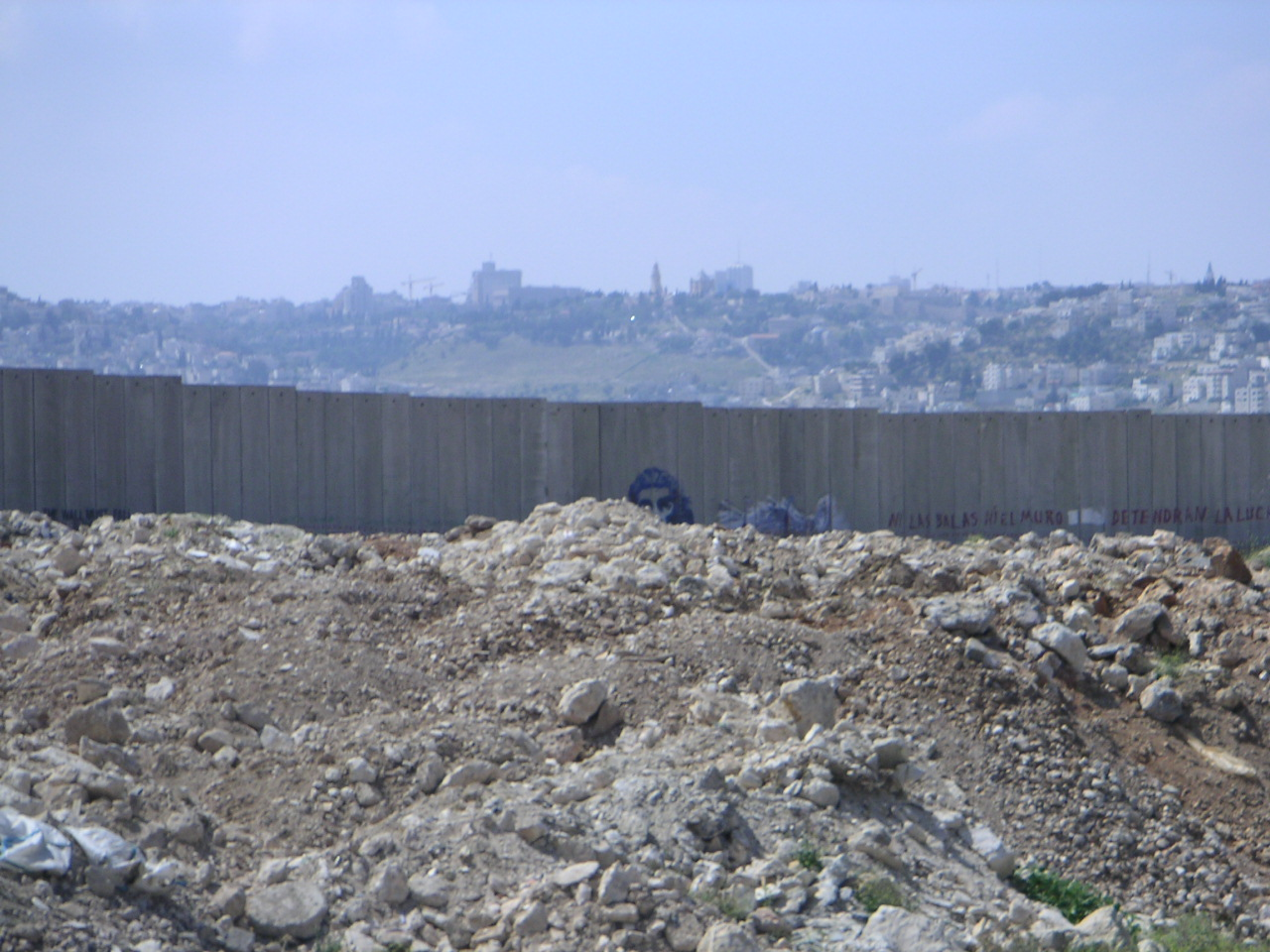
West Bank barrier

The West Bank barrier is a physical barrier ordered for construction by the Israeli government, consisting of a network of fences with vehicle-barrier trenches. Israel began building the barrier on 23 June 2002, two years into the Second Intifada. It is surrounded by an on average 60 m (197 ft) wide exclusion area (90%). Sections of the barrier, especially near urban areas, are made of concrete walls up to 9 m (30 ft) in height. It is located mainly within the West Bank, partly along the 1949 Armistice line, or "Green Line" between the West Bank and Israel. The length of the barrier as approved by the Israeli government is 708 km (440 mi) long. As of 2020, approximately 454 km (282 mi) have been constructed (64%). The space between the barrier and the Green Line is a closed military zone known as the Seam Zone, cutting off 9% of the West Bank, dozens of villages, and around 25,000 Palestinians from the rest of the Palestinian territory.

The barrier wall only runs along or near the Green Line for 15% of its length; 85% of the wall runs inside the West Bank, by as much as 18 kilometres (11 mi).

Supporters of the wall say it was necessary for protecting Israeli civilians from Palestinian attacks, citing a decrease in suicide bombing coming from the West Bank between 2000 through 2006; however Israel's State Comptroller has acknowledged that most of the suicide bombers crossed into Israel through existing checkpoints.

Opponents state the barrier is an illegal attempt to annex Palestinian land under the guise of "security", has the intent or effect to pre-empt final status negotiations, and severely restricts Palestinian livelihoods, particularly limiting their freedom of movement within and from the West Bank. Palestinians describe the wall as an element of racial segregation and a representation of Israeli apartheid, often calling it a "wall of apartheid". The wall is also a violation of international law.

=== Administrative divisions ===
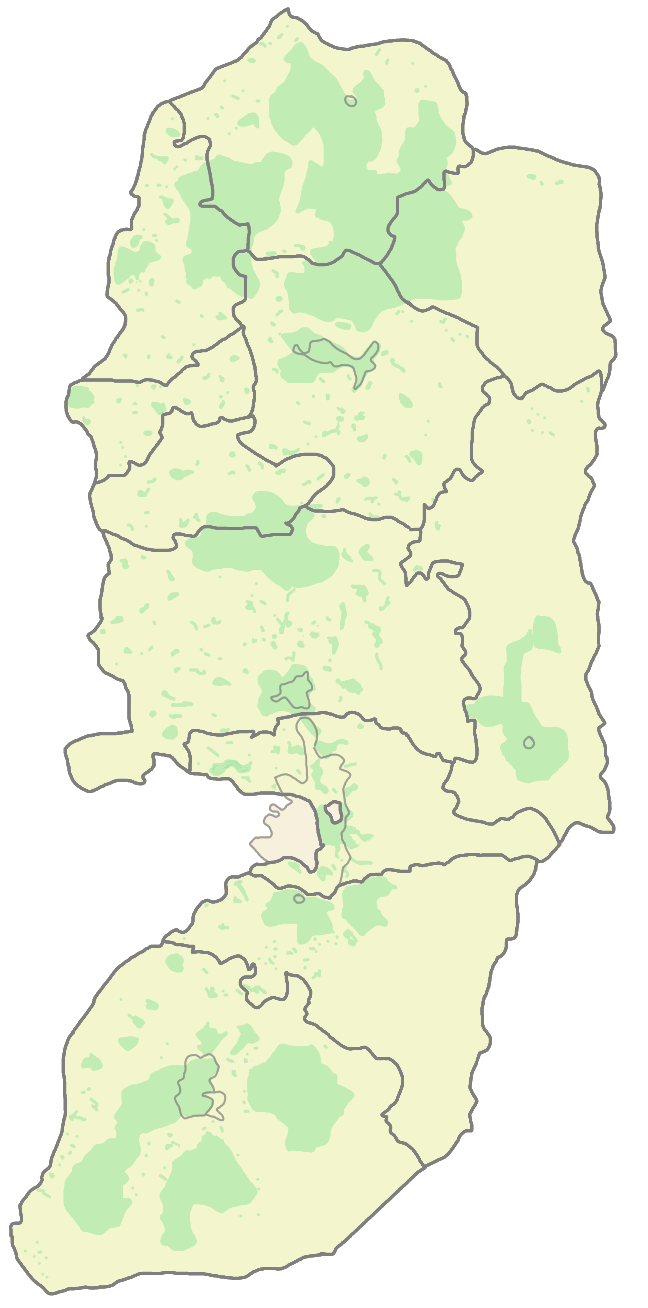
Northern Governorates

After the signing of the Oslo Accords, the West Bank was divided into 11 governorates under the jurisdiction of the Palestinian National Authority. Since 2007 there are two governments claiming to be the legitimate government of the Palestinian National Authority, one based in the West Bank and one based in the Gaza Strip.

Governorate	Population	Area (km^{2})
Jenin Governorate	311,231	583
Tubas Governorate	64,719	372
Tulkarm Governorate	182,053	239
Nablus Governorate	380,961	592
Qalqilya Governorate	110,800	164
Salfit Governorate	70,727	191
Ramallah and Al-Bireh Governorate	348,110	844
Jericho Governorate	52,154	608
Jerusalem Governorate (including Israeli-annexed East Jerusalem with Israeli citizenship)	419,108	344
Bethlehem Governorate	216,114	644
Hebron Governorate	706,508	1,060
Total	2,862,485	5,671

==== Israeli administrative districts ====
The West Bank is further divided into 8 administrative regions: Menashe (Jenin area), HaBik'a (Jordan Valley), Shomron (Shechem area, known in Arabic as Nablus), Efrayim (Tulkarm area), Binyamin (Ramallah/al-Bireh area), Maccabim (Maccabim area), Etzion (Bethlehem area) and Yehuda (Hebron area).

== Status ==
=== Israeli occupation ===
Boundaries defined in the 1947 UN Partition Plan for Palestine: Area assigned for a Jewish state Area assigned for an Arab state Planned Corpus separatum with the intention that Jerusalem would be neither Jewish nor Arab Armistice Demarcation Lines of 1949 (Green Line): Israel per 1949 armistice lines West Jerusalem and other areas under Israeli control from 1949 Gaza and the West Bank (including East Jerusalem) under Egyptian and Jordanian control till 1967

From 1517 to 1917 the West Bank was part of the Ottoman Empire. Turkey, successor state to the Ottoman Empire, renounced its territorial claims in 1923, signing the Treaty of Lausanne, and the area now called the West Bank became an integral part of the British Mandate for Palestine. During the Mandate period Britain had no right of sovereignty, which was held by the people under the mandate. Nevertheless, Britain, as custodians of the land, implemented the land tenure laws in Palestine, which it had inherited from the Ottoman Turks (as defined in the Ottoman Land Code of 1858), applying these laws to both Arab and Jewish legal tenants or otherwise. In 1947 the UN General Assembly recommended that the area that became the West Bank become part of a future Arab state, but this proposal was opposed by the Arab states at the time. In 1948, Jordan occupied the West Bank and annexed it in 1950.

In 1967, Israel captured the West Bank from Jordan in the Six-Day War. UN Security Council Resolution 242 followed, calling for withdrawal (return to the 1949 armistice lines) from territories occupied in the conflict in exchange for peace and mutual recognition. Since 1979, the United Nations Security Council, the United Nations General Assembly, the United States, the EU, the International Court of Justice, and the International Committee of the Red Cross refer to the West Bank, including East Jerusalem, as occupied Palestinian territory or the occupied territories. General Assembly resolution 58/292 (17 May 2004) affirmed that the Palestinian people have the right to sovereignty over the area.

The International Court of Justice (ICJ) and the Supreme Court of Israel have ruled that the status of the West Bank is that of military occupation. In its 2004 advisory opinion the International Court of Justice concluded that:

The territories situated between the Green Line and the former eastern boundary of Palestine under the Mandate were occupied by Israel in 1967 during the armed conflict between Israel and Jordan. Under customary international law, the Court observes, these were therefore occupied territories in which Israel had the status of occupying Power. Subsequent events in these territories have done nothing to alter this situation. The Court concludes that all these territories (including East Jerusalem) remain occupied territories and that Israel has continued to have the status of occupying Power.

In the same vein the Israeli Supreme Court stated in the 2004 Beit Sourik case that:

The general point of departure of all parties – which is also our point of departure – is that Israel holds the area in belligerent occupation (occupatio bellica)......The authority of the military commander flows from the provisions of public international law regarding belligerent occupation. These rules are established principally in the Regulations Concerning the Laws and Customs of War on Land, The Hague, 18 October 1907 [hereinafter – the Hague Regulations]. These regulations reflect customary international law. The military commander's authority is also anchored in IV Geneva Convention Relative to the Protection of Civilian Persons in Time of War 1949.

The executive branch of the Israeli government, through the Ministry of Foreign Affairs, has defined the West Bank as "disputed" instead of "occupied" territory, whose status can only be determined through negotiations. The Ministry argues that the West Bank was not captured in war because it was not under the legitimate sovereignty of any state prior to the Six-Day War (when it was occupied by Israel).

The International Court of Justice advisory opinion of 9 July 2004, however, found that the West Bank, including East Jerusalem, is territory held by Israel under military occupation, regardless of its status prior to it coming under Israeli occupation, and that the Fourth Geneva convention applies de jure. The international community regards the West Bank (including East Jerusalem) as territories occupied by Israel.

In 2024, the ICJ reaffirmed in an advisory opinion that Israel's military occupation of the West Bank (along with the Gaza strip and East Jerusalem) is unlawful. The opinion added that Israel's "legislation and measures violate the international prohibition on racial segregation and apartheid."

International law (Article 49 of the Fourth Geneva Convention) prohibits "transfers of the population of an occupying power to occupied territories", incurring a responsibility on the part of Israel's government to not settle Israeli citizens in the West Bank.

As of June 2024, 146 (75.6%) of the 193 member states of the United Nations have recognised the State of Palestine within the Palestinian territories, which are recognized by Israel to constitute a single territorial unit, and of which the West Bank is the core of the would-be state.

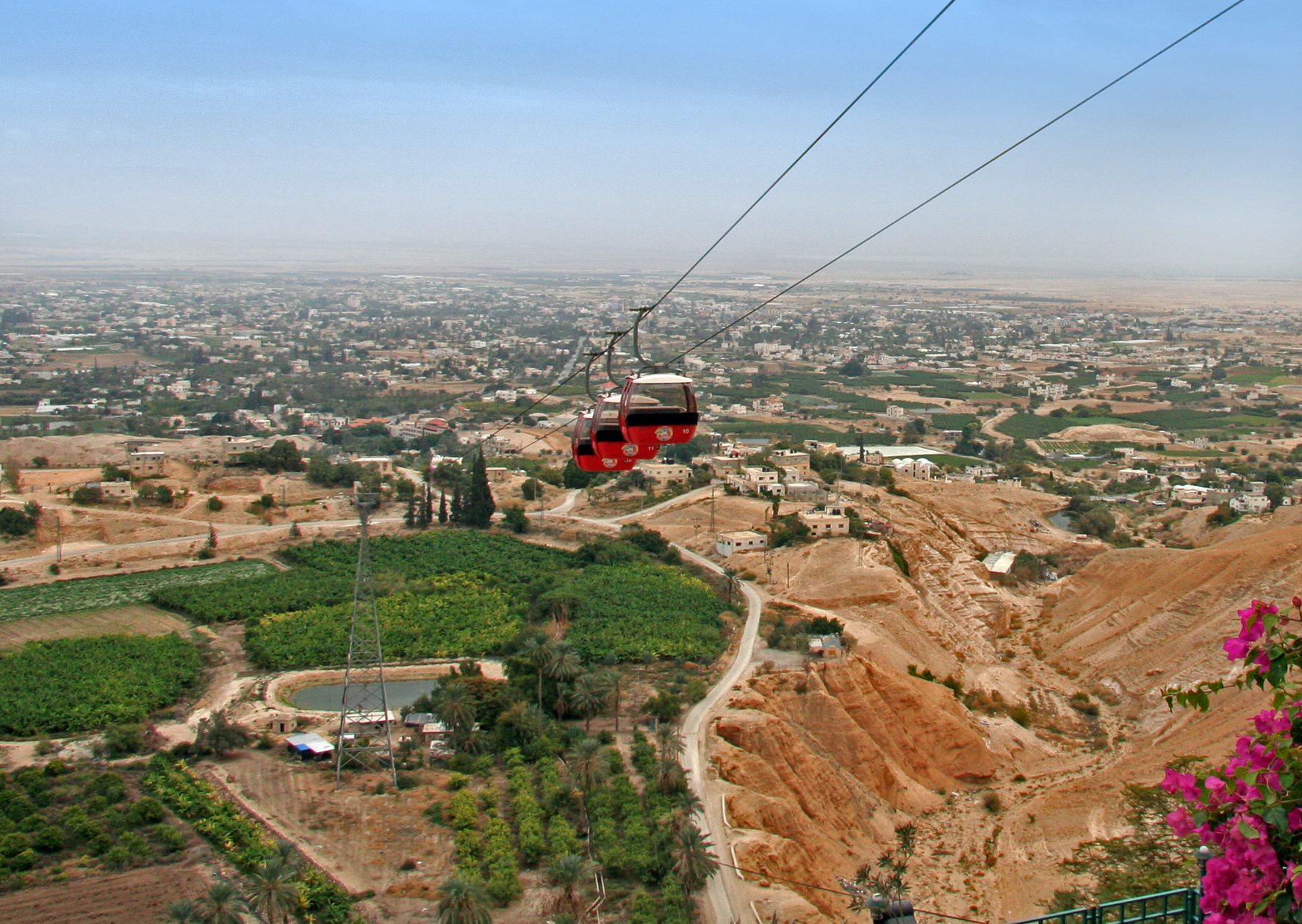
City of Jericho, West Bank

=== Statehood ===
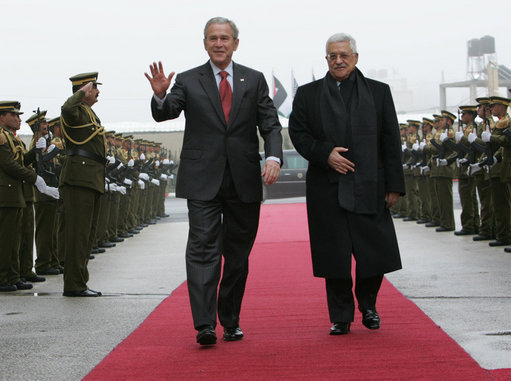
U.S. President George Bush and Mahmoud Abbas in Ramallah, 2008

The future status of the West Bank, together with the Gaza Strip on the Mediterranean shore, has been the subject of negotiation between the Palestinians and Israelis, although the 2002 Road Map for Peace, proposed by the "Quartet" comprising the United States, Russia, the European Union, and the United Nations, envisages an independent Palestinian state in these territories living side by side with Israel (see also history of the State of Palestine). However, the "Road Map" states that in the first phase, Palestinians must end all attacks on Israel, whereas Israel must dismantle all outposts.

The Palestinian Authority believes that the West Bank ought to be a part of their sovereign nation, and that the presence of Israeli military control is a violation of their right to Palestinian Authority rule. The United Nations calls the West Bank and Gaza Strip Israeli-occupied territories. The United States State Department also refers to the territories as occupied.

In 2005 the United States ambassador to Israel, Daniel C. Kurtzer, expressed U.S. support "for the retention by Israel of major Israeli population centres [in the West Bank] as an outcome of negotiations", reflecting President Bush's statement a year earlier that a permanent peace treaty would have to reflect "demographic realities" on the West Bank. In May 2011 US President Barack Obama officially stated US support for a future Palestinian state based on borders prior to the 1967 War, allowing for land swaps where they are mutually agreeable between the two sides. Obama was the first US president to formally support the policy, but he stated that it had been one long held by the US in its Middle East negotiations.

In December 2016, a resolution was adopted by United Nations Security Council that condemned Israel's settlement activity as a "flagrant violation" of international law with "no legal validity". It demands that Israel stop such activity and fulfil its obligations as an occupying power under the Fourth Geneva Convention. The United States abstained from the vote.

In 2020, President Donald Trump unveiled a peace plan, radically different from previous peace plans. The plan failed to gain support.

West Bank was ranked 10th most electoral democracy in the Middle East and North Africa according to V-Dem Democracy indices in 2024 with a score of 0.254 out of one.

=== Public opinion ===
Palestinian public opinion opposes Israeli military and settler presence in the West Bank as a violation of their right to statehood and sovereignty. Israeli opinion is split into a number of views:

- Complete or partial withdrawal from the West Bank in hopes of peaceful co-existence in separate states (sometimes called the "land for peace" position); (In a 2003 poll, 76% of Israelis supported a peace agreement based on that principle).
- Maintenance of a military presence in the West Bank to reduce Palestinian terrorism by deterrence or by armed intervention, while relinquishing some degree of political control;
- Annexation of the West Bank while considering the Palestinian population with Palestinian Authority citizenship with Israeli residence permit as per the Elon Peace Plan;
- Annexation of the West Bank and assimilation of the Palestinian population to fully fledged Israeli citizens;
- Transfer of the East Jerusalem Palestinian population (a 2002 poll at the height of the Al-Aqsa Intifada found 46% of Israelis favouring Palestinian transfer of Jerusalem residents).

== Economy ==
As of the early 21st century, the economy of Palestine is chronically depressed, with unemployment rates constantly over 20% since 2000. The unemployment rate was 19% in the West Bank in first half of 2013.

=== Early economic impact ===
The Jordanians neglected to invest much in the area during their time governing the area from 1948 to 1967, although there was some investment in the immediate vicinity of Jerusalem.

Soon after the 1967 war, Yigal Allon produced the Allon Plan, which would have annexed a strip along the Jordan River valley and excluded areas closer to the pre-1967 border, which had a high density of Palestinians. Moshe Dayan proposed a plan which Gershom Gorenberg likens to a "photo negative of Allon's." (Note: "In fact, Dayan had submitted his own secret plan. Predictably, it was the photo negative of Allon's. The mountain ridge – not the lowlands along the Jordan – was the strategic land Israel needed, Dayan asserted.") The Allon plan evolved over a period of time to include more territory. The final draft dating from 1970 would have annexed about half of the West Bank. Israel had no overall approach for integrating the West Bank. (Note: Ilan Pappe holds a dissenting view, asserting that a Shacham Plan existed for the occupation and administration of the West Bank before 1967.)

The early occupation set severe limits on public investment and comprehensive development programmes in the territories. British and Arab commercial banks operating in the West Bank were closed down soon after Israel assumed power there. Bank Leumi then opened nine branches, without successfully replacing the earlier system. Farmers could get loans, but Palestinian businessmen avoided taking out loans from them, since they charged 9% compared to 5% interest in Jordan. By June 1967, only a third of West Bank land had been registered under Jordan's Settlement of Disputes over Land and Water Law. In 1968, Israel moved to cancel the possibility of registering one's title with the Jordanian Land Register.

Ian Lustick states that Israel "virtually prevented" Palestinian investment in local industry and agriculture. At the same time, Israel encouraged Arab labour to enter into Israel's economy, and regarded them as a new, expanded, and protected market for Israeli exports. Limited export of Palestinian goods to Israel was allowed. Expropriation of prime agricultural land in an economy where two thirds of the workforce had farmed is believed to account for the flight of labourers to work in Israel.

As much as 40% of the workforce commuted to Israel on a daily basis finding only poorly paid menial employment. Remittances from labourers earning a wage in Israel were the major factor in Palestinian economic growth during the 1969–73 boom years. The migration of workers from the territories had a negative impact on local industry, by creating an internal labour scarcity in the West Bank and consequent pressure for higher wages there. The contrast between the quality of their lives and Israelis' growing prosperity stoked resentment.

Attempting to impose governmental authority, Israel established a licensing system according to which no industrial plant could be built without obtaining a prior Israeli permit. With Military Order No. 393 (14 June 1970), the local commander was given the power and authority to block any construction if, in his evaluation, the building might pose a danger to Israel's security. The overall effect was to obstruct manufacturing development and subordinate any local industrial activity to the exigencies of Israel's economy, or to block the creation of industries that might compete with Israel's. For example, entrepreneurs were denied a permit for a cement factory in Hebron. In order to protect Israeli farmers, melon production was forbidden, imports of grapes and dates were banned, and limits were set to how many cucumbers and tomatoes could be produced. Israeli milk producers exerted pressure on the Ministry for Industry and Trade to stop the establishment of a competitive dairy in Ramallah.

The sum effect after two decades was that 15% of all Palestinian firms in the West Bank and Gaza employing over eight people, and 32% with seven or less, were prohibited from selling their products in Israel. Israeli protectionist policies distorted wider trade relations to the point that, by 1996, 90% of all West Bank imports came from Israel, with consumers paying more than they would for comparable products had they been able to exercise commercial autonomy.

=== Consequences of occupation ===
==== Economic consequences ====
According to a 2013 World Bank report, Israeli restrictions hinder Palestinian economic development in Area C of the West Bank. A 2013 World Bank report calculates that, if the Interim Agreement was respected and restrictions lifted, a few key industries alone would produce US$2.2 billion per annum more (or 23% of 2011 Palestinian GDP) and reduce by some US$800 million (50%) the Palestinian Authority's deficit; the employment would increase by 35%.

==== Water supply ====
Amnesty International has criticized the way that the Israeli state is dealing with the regional water resources:

Palestinians in the Occupied Palestinian Territories (OPT) do not have access to adequate, safe water supplies ... Discriminatory Israeli policies in the OPT are the root cause of the striking disparity in access to water between Palestinians and Israelis ... The inequality is even more pronounced between Palestinian communities and unlawful Israeli settlements, established in the OPT in violation of international law. Swimming pools, well-watered lawns and large irrigated farms in Israeli settlements in the OPT stand in stark contrast next to Palestinian villages whose inhabitants struggle even to meet their essential domestic water needs. In parts of the West Bank, Israeli settlers use up to 20 times more water per capita than neighbouring Palestinian communities, who survive on barely 20 litres of water per capita a day—the minimum amount recommended by the WHO for emergency situations response.

Israeli settlers in the West Bank have seized dozens of wells from Palestinians. The wells are privately owned by Palestinians and the settlers forcibly took them, gave them Hebrew names and, with the assistance of the Israeli military, prevent Arab people, including the wells' owners, from using the wells and the pools the wells feed.

==== Israeli garbage disposal ====
Israel ratified the international Basel Convention treaty on Israel on 14 December 1994, according to which, any transfer of waste must be performed with an awareness of the dangers posed to the disempowered occupied people. It forbids the creation among them of "environmental sacrifice zones". Israel, it is argued, uses the West Bank as a "sacrifice" zone by placing 15 waste treatment plants, which are there under less stringent rules that those required in Israel because a different legal system has been organized regarding hazardous materials that can be noxious to local people and the environment. The military authorities do not make public the details of these operations. These materials include sewage sludge, infectious medical waste, used oils, solvents, metals, electronic waste, and batteries.

In 2007 it was estimated that 38% (35 mcm a year) of all wastewater flowing into the West Bank derived from settlements and Jerusalem. Of the 121 settlements surveyed, 81 had wastewater treatment plant, much of it inadequate or subject to breakdown, with much sewage flowing into lowland streams and terrain where Palestinian villages are located. Only 4 of 53 indictments for waste pollution were made over the years from 2000 to 2008, whereas in Israel the laws are strictly applied and, in 2006 alone, 230 enforcements for the same abuse were enforced. At the same time 90–95% of Palestinian wastewater was not treated, with only 1 of 4 Israeli plants built in the 1970s to that purpose functioning, and the neglect to improve the infrastructure is attributed to Israeli budgetary problems.

After the Oslo Accords, the global community earmarked $250,000,000 for West Bank wastewater infrastructure. Israel at times insisted its approval was conditional on linking the grid to Israeli settlements, which neither the donors nor Palestinians accepted. Most of the infrastructure was subsequently destroyed by IDF military operations. The PA raised funds from Germany for 15 plants, but only managed to build one, at al-Bireh, within Area B, though even there Israel insisted the plant process waste from the settlement of Psagot, though refusing to pay fees for the treatment. Palestinian town Salfit has been deeply affected by sewage overflow channelled past the town from the settlement of Ariel.

Unlike the data available for sewage treatment within Israel, the Israeli Water Commission refuses to provide public reports on 15 million cubic metres of sewage flowing from Israeli settlements in the West Bank. It claims 75% is treated adequately but independent Israeli studies (2000) suggest that only 6% met Israeli treatment standards, while 48% was either not treated adequastely or discharged raw. Since then some improvements have been implemented.

The landfill near Al-Jiftlik in the Jericho Governorate, built on absentee Palestinian property without planning or an environment impact analysis, is for the exclusive use of waste, 1,000 tons per day, produced by Israeli settlements and cities within Israel. Palestinians are restricted to 3 landfills, and permits for more have been denied unless the sites can be used to dump settlement garbage. Even if a permit is given without this agreement, settler waste under military escort is still dumped there.

Israel has been accused of engaging in 'warfare ecology' in the West Bank. In response to local opposition in Israel to waste treatment plants and the high cost of meeting stringent environment laws in that country. It has been argued that Israel had used the area of the West Bank as a 'sacrifice zone' where its waste can be dumped." (Note: 'sacrifice zone is a geographic area that has become irrevocably impaired by environmental damage or economic neglect.')

Many waste treatment facilities in the West Bank were built for processing waste generated inside Israeli sovereign territory, according to B'Tselem, Israel's leading human rights organization for monitoring the West Bank.

The Israel government requires no reporting by these West Bank facilities of the amount of waste they process or the risks they pose to the local population, and applies less rigorous regulatory standards to these facilities than it does to solid waste treatment facilities in Israel. The UNEP has described Israeli vehicle dismantling in the Palestinian territories as "unregulated". B'Tselem has said that "any transfer of waste to the West Bank is a breach of international law which Israel is dutybound to uphold" because according to international law "an occupied territory or its resources may not be used for the benefit of the occupying power's own needs."

Experts have also warned that some of these facilities are garbage dumps that endanger the purity of the mountain aquifer, which is one of the largest sources of water in the region. In addition to the exporting of Israeli waste and the waste generated by settlers, Israeli industrial and manufacturing operations with harmful health effects are typically outsourced to the West Bank where they can be carried out with little to no regulatory oversight.

==== Palestinian water and sewage ====
In 1995, the Palestinian Water Authority (PWA) was established by a presidential decree. One year later, its functions, objectives, and responsibilities were defined through a by-law, giving the PWA the mandate to manage water resources and execute the water policy.

About 90% of the Palestinians in the territories had access to improved sanitation in 2008. Cesspits were used by 39% of households, while access to the sewer network increased to 55% in 2011, up from 39% in 1999. In the West Bank, only 13,000 out of 85,000 m^{3} of wastewater were treated in five municipal wastewater treatment plants in Hebron, Jenin, Ramallah, Tulkarem, and Al-Bireh. The Al Bireh plant was constructed in 2000 with funding by the German aid agency KfW. According to the World Bank report, the other four plants perform poorly concerning efficiency and quality.

==== Resource extraction ====
Based on the number of quarries per km^{2} in Areas A and B, it is calculated that, were Israel to lift restrictions, a further 275 quarries could be opened in Area C. The World Bank estimates that Israel's virtual ban on issuing Palestinians permits for quarries there costs the Palestinian economy at least US$241 million per year. In international law drawing on the Hague Conventions (Article 55), it is established that an occupying power may reap some value from the resources of the country occupied but not deplete its assets, and that the usufruct must benefit the people under occupation. The Oslo Accords agreed to hand over mining rights to the Palestinian Authority. Israel licenses eleven settlement quarries in the West Bank and they sell 94% of their material to Israel, which arguably constitutes "depletion" and pays royalties to its West Bank military government and settlement municipalities.

Thus the German cement firm quarrying at Nahal Raba paid out €430,000 ($479,000) in taxes to the Samaria Regional Council in 2014 alone. The Israeli High Court rejected a petition that such quarrying was a violation by stating that after four decades Israeli law must adapt to "the realities on the ground". The state did undertake not to open more quarries.

A Human Rights Watch report contrasts the difference between a Palestinian-owned quarry company in Beit Fajar and that of a European one working on what Israeli considers its state land. The European company obtained a concession and licence to harvest stone, whereas Israel refuses permits for most of the roughly 40 Beit Fajar quarries, or nearly any other Palestinian-owned quarry in the West Bank under Israeli administration.

Israel had denied Palestinians permits to process minerals in that area of the West Bank. The products of the Israeli cosmetics firm Ahava, established in 1988, were developed in laboratories at the West Bank Dead Sea settlements of Mitzpe Shalem and Kalya. 60% of their production is sold in the EU market. In 2018 the UN, stating that the violations were both "pervasive and devastating" to the local Palestinian population, identified some 206 companies which do business with Israeli settlements in the West Bank.

Roughly 73 percent of global bromine production comes from Israeli and Jordanian exploitation of the Dead Sea. The potential incremental value that could accrue to the Palestinian economy from the production and sales of potash, bromine, and magnesium has been conservatively estimated at US$918 million per annum, or 9 percent of GDP. The lost earnings from not being allowed to process Dead Sea minerals such as potash, and for making bromide-based flame retardants, based on calculations of comparable use by Israel and Jordan, suggest a figure of $642 million.

==== Loss of cultural property ====
Albert Glock argued that Israel is responsible for the disappearance of significant parts of the Palestinian cultural patrimony, by confiscating Arab cultural resources. In 1967 it appropriated the Palestine Archaeological Museum (Note: "The one centre of archaeological activity that might have provided a base for Palestinian archaeologists was the Palestine Archaeological Museum in Jerusalem, which was under the control not of Jordan but of trustees made up of the directors of the several foreign schools of archaeology in the city. It is therefore not clear why persons like Dimitri Baramki did not continue their work as archaeologists employed by the Palestine Museum. In any event, Jordan nationalized the museum only months before the June 1967 war, enabling the Israelis to claim it as theirs by right of conquest,") and its library in East Jerusalem. (Note: "Fourth, the disappearance of the Palestinian patrimony (material evidence) through the deliberate confiscation of Arab cultural resources by Israelis (such as the large library of Dr. Tawfiq Canaan in 1948, the Palestine Archaeological Museum and its library in Jerusalem in 1967, and the library of the Palestine Research Center in Beirut in 1982), as well as the destruction of cultural property in the form of entire villages in 1948–49. This last is particularly crucial, since the Palestinians' link to their past is largely through the villages, few towns, and fewer cities that predominated in their land during the last thirteen centuries.") Often these losses are personal, as when homes are ransacked and looted of their valuables. The journalist Hamdi Faraj, jailed for endangering public order, had his 500-volume library confiscated, including copies of the Bible and Qur'an and, when he applied for their restitution, was told all the books had been accidentally burnt. The Israeli occupation has wrought a profound change in Palestinian identity, which clings to a sense of a "paradise lost" before the changes brought out by the 1967 conquest. (Note: Israeli settlers forced to evacuate their settlements have also called their prior state as one of a "lost paradise".)

==== Tourism ====
Palestine contains several of the most significant sites for Muslims, Christians, and Jews, and are endowed with a world-class heritage highly attractive to tourists and pilgrims. The West Bank Palestinians themselves have difficulties in accessing the territory for recreation.

Based on 1967 figures, the Palestinian Dead Sea Coastline is roughly 40 km in length, of which 15% (6 kilometres) could lend itself to the same tourist infrastructure developed by Jordan and Israel in their respective areas. Were Israel to permit a parallel development of this Palestinian sector, the World Bank estimates that 2,900 jobs would be added, allowing the Palestinian economy a potential value-added input of something like $126 million annually. It is also the only maritime recreational outlet for West Bankers, but according to an Acri complaint to the Israeli Supreme Court in 2008 Palestinians are often barred or turned away from the beaches at their only access point, the Beit Ha'arava checkpoint on Route 90. Acri claimed the ban responds to fears by settlers who operate tourist concessions in this West Bank area that they will lose Jewish customers if there are too many West Bank Palestinians on the beaches. (Note: 'The ban came to light after the testimony of two Israeli army reservists who said that at the beginning of their tour of duty in May they were told that the purpose of the checkpoint was to "prevent Palestinians coming from the Jordan Valley to the Dead Sea beaches". One of the reservists, Doron Karbel, testified that as a "side note", the Jordan Valley Brigade Commander, Colonel Yigal Slovik, had said the reason for the checkpoint was that "when Jews and Palestinian vacationers were sitting on the beaches side by side it hurt the business of the surrounding yishuvim (Jewish communities).")

The key Palestinian towns in the West Bank for tourism are East Jerusalem, Bethlehem, and Jericho. All access points are controlled by Israel and the road system, checkpoints and obstacles in place for visitors desiring to visit Palestinian towns leaves their hotels half-empty. From 92 to 94 cents in every dollar of the tourist trade goes to Israel. The general itineraries under Israeli management focus predominantly on Jewish history. Obstacles placed in the way of Palestinian-managed tourism down to 1995 included withholding licences from tour guides, and hotels, for construction or renovation, and control of airports and highways, enabling Israel to develop a virtual monopoly on tourism.

=== Transportation and communications ===
==== Road system ====
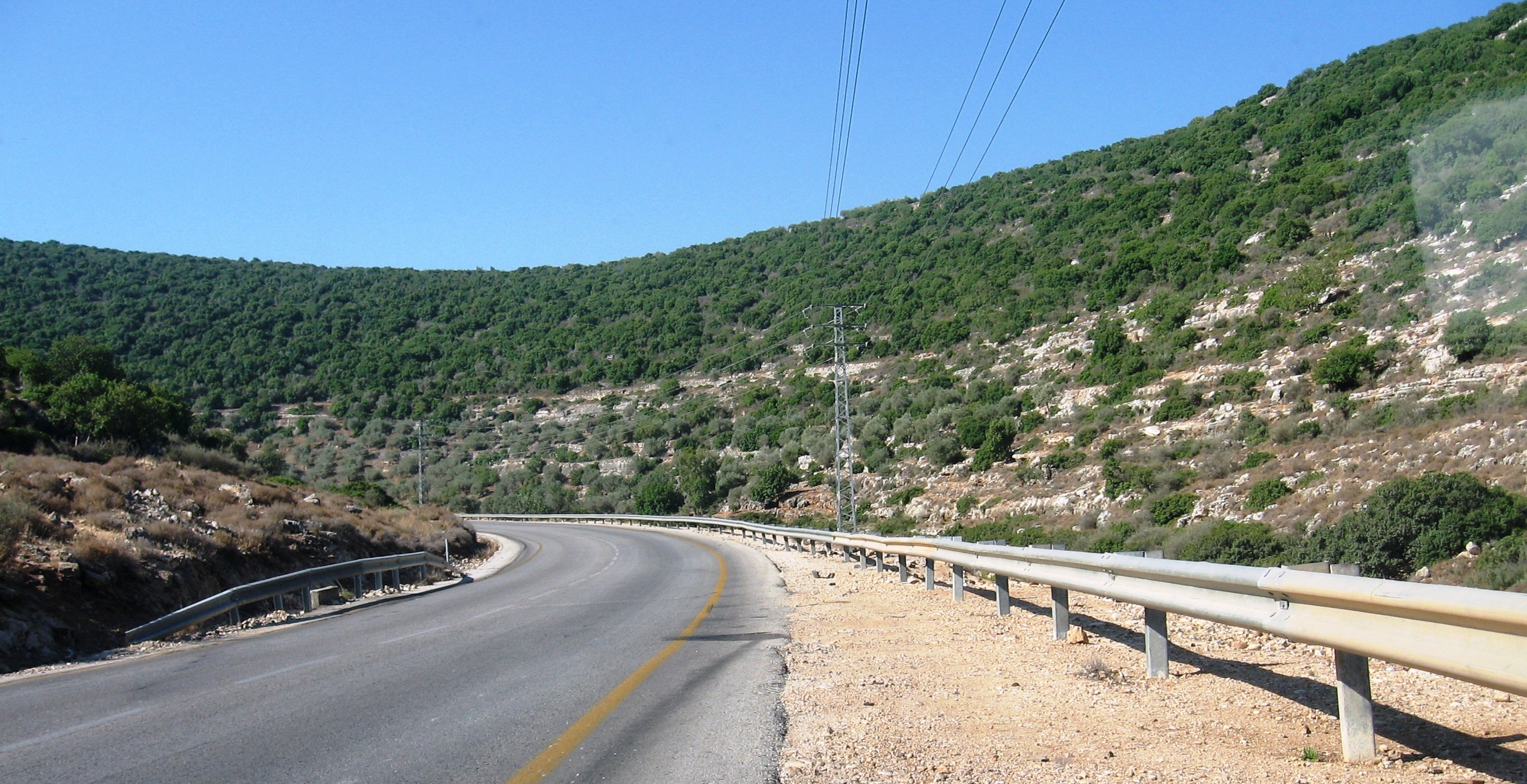
A road in the West Bank

In 2010, the West Bank and Gaza Strip together had 4,686 km (2,912 mi) of roadways.

It has been said that for "Jewish settlers, roads connect; for Palestinians, they separate." Between 1994 and 1997, the Israeli Defense Forces (IDF) built 290 km (180 mi) of bypass roads in the territories, on appropriated land because they ran close to Palestinian villages. The given aim was said to be to afford protection to settlers from Palestinian sniping, bombing, and drive-by shootings. For TAU emeritus professor of geography Elisha Efrat, they ignored the historical topography, road systems, and environmental characteristics of the West Bank, and simply formed an apartheid network of "octopus arms which hold a grip on Palestinian population centres". (Note: "This imposed network of roads could be characterized by lack of consideration for the existing historical road network in the region; by inappropriateness of topography; by construction in marginal areas for a small population; by land confiscation of Arab villages; by lack of a logical hierarchy of roads with defined traffic functions; and above all by the development of a new road system as a means of territorial dominance of the region.")

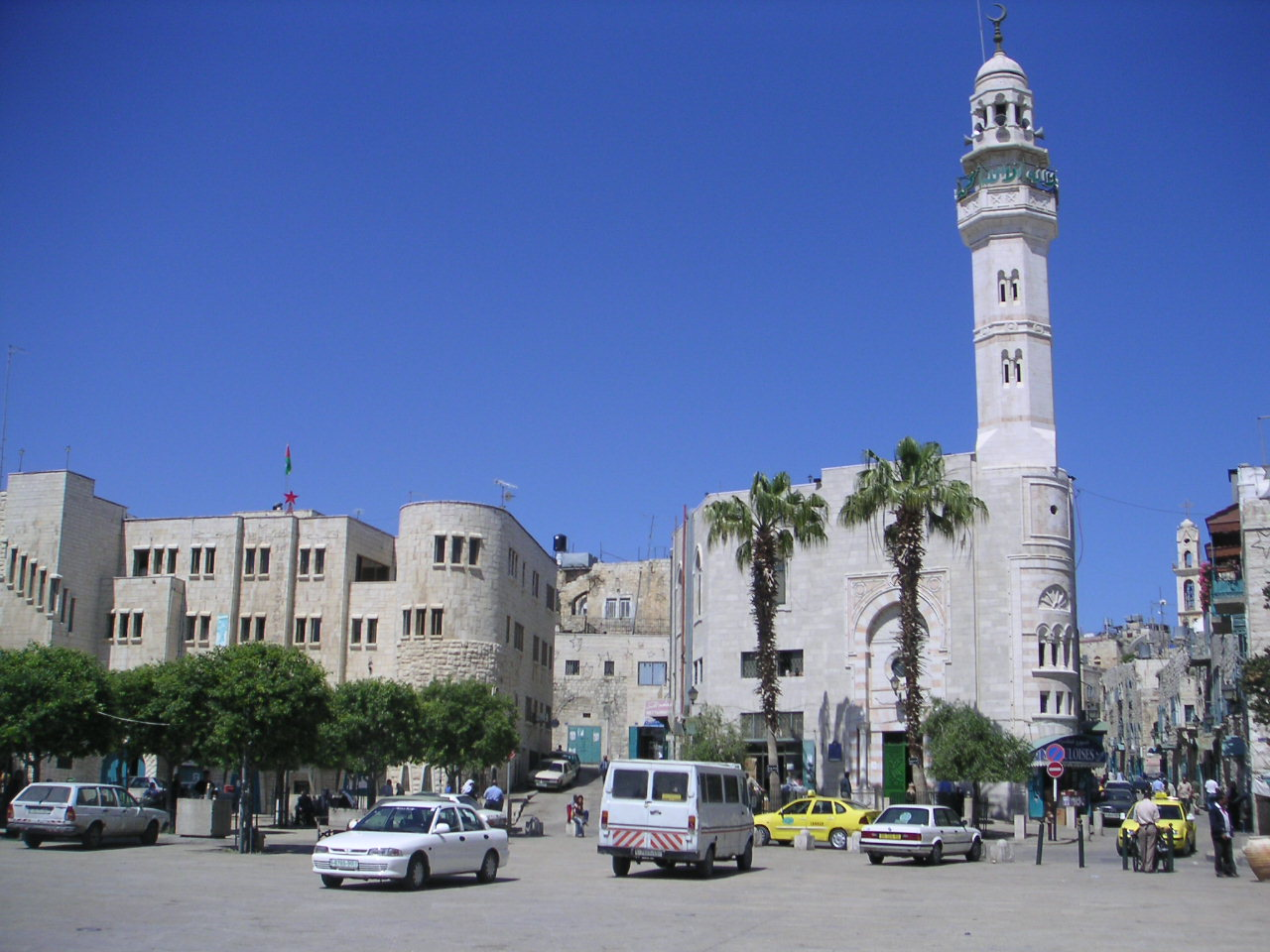
Roads of Bethlehem, West Bank

A large number of embankments, concrete slabs, and barriers impeded movement on primary and secondary roads. The result was to cantonize and fragment Palestinian townships, and cause endless obstacles to Palestinians going to work, schools, markets, and relatives. (Note: " With Palestinian traffic banned from all the main and secondary roads, clusters of yellow group taxis gather at each such barrier, and groups of people trying to get to work, school, clinics, universities, relatives houses, or markets clamber up and down sand embankments or across ditches to circumvent concrete slabs and soldiers, who sometimes shoot at them.") Ramallah was cut off from all of its feeder villages in 2000.

Though prohibited by law, confiscation of Palestinian identity cards at checkpoints is a daily occurrence. At best drivers must wait for several hours for them to be returned, when, as can happen, the IDs themselves are lost as soldiers change shifts, in which case Palestinians are directed to some regional office the next day, and more checkpoints to get there. Even before the Al Aqsa Intifada, UNFPA estimated that 20% of pregnant West Bank women were unable to access prenatal care because of the difficulties and delays caused by crossing checkpoints, and dozens were forced to deliver their children on the roadside.

Constant uncertainty and the inability to plan are the results for Palestinians of the Israeli military rules governing their movements. The World Bank noted that additional costs arising from longer travelling caused by restrictions on movement through three major routes in the West Bank alone ran to (2013) USD 185 million a year, adding that other, earlier calculations (2007) suggest restrictions on the Palestinian labour market cost the West Bank approximately US$229 million per annum. It concluded that such imposed restrictions had a major negative impact on the local economy, hindering stability and growth. In 2007, official Israeli statistics indicated that there were 180,000 Palestinians on Israel's secret travel ban list. 561 roadblocks and checkpoints were in place (October), the number of Palestinians licensed to drive private cars was 46,166 and the annual cost of permits was $454.

These checkpoints, together with the separation wall and the restricted networks restructure the West Bank into "land cells", freezing the flow of normal everyday Palestinian lives. Israel sets up flying checkpoints without notice. In 2017, 2,941 flying checkpoints were set up along West Bank roads, around 327 a month. There were 476 unstaffed physical obstacles (dirt mounds, concrete blocks, gates, and fenced sections) on roads. Of the gates erected at village entrances, 59 were always closed.

The checkpoint system did not ease up after the Oslo Accords, but was strengthened after them, which has been interpreted as suggesting their function is to assert control over Palestinians, and as a sign of an unwillingness to yield ground in the West Bank. According to PA Health Ministry statistics relating to the period from 2000 to 2006, of 68 Palestinian women who gave birth to their children while held up at checkpoints, 35 miscarried and 5 died while delivering their child there. Machsom Watch accumulated over a mere five years (2001–2006) some 10,000 eyewitness reports and testimonies regarding the difficulties faced by Palestinians trying to negotiate West Bank checkpoints.

Transportation infrastructure is particularly problematic as Palestinian use of roads in Area C is highly restricted, and travel times can be inordinate; the Palestinian Authority has also been unable to develop roads, airports or railways in or through Area C, while many other roads were restricted only to public transportation and to Palestinians who have special permits from Israeli authorities.

At certain times, Israel maintained more than 600 checkpoints or roadblocks in the region. Movement restrictions on main roads between cities were still (as of 2005) blamed for poverty and economic depression in the West Bank. Underpasses and bridges, 28 of which have been constructed and 16 of which are planned, link Palestinian areas separated from each other by Israeli settlements and bypass roads"

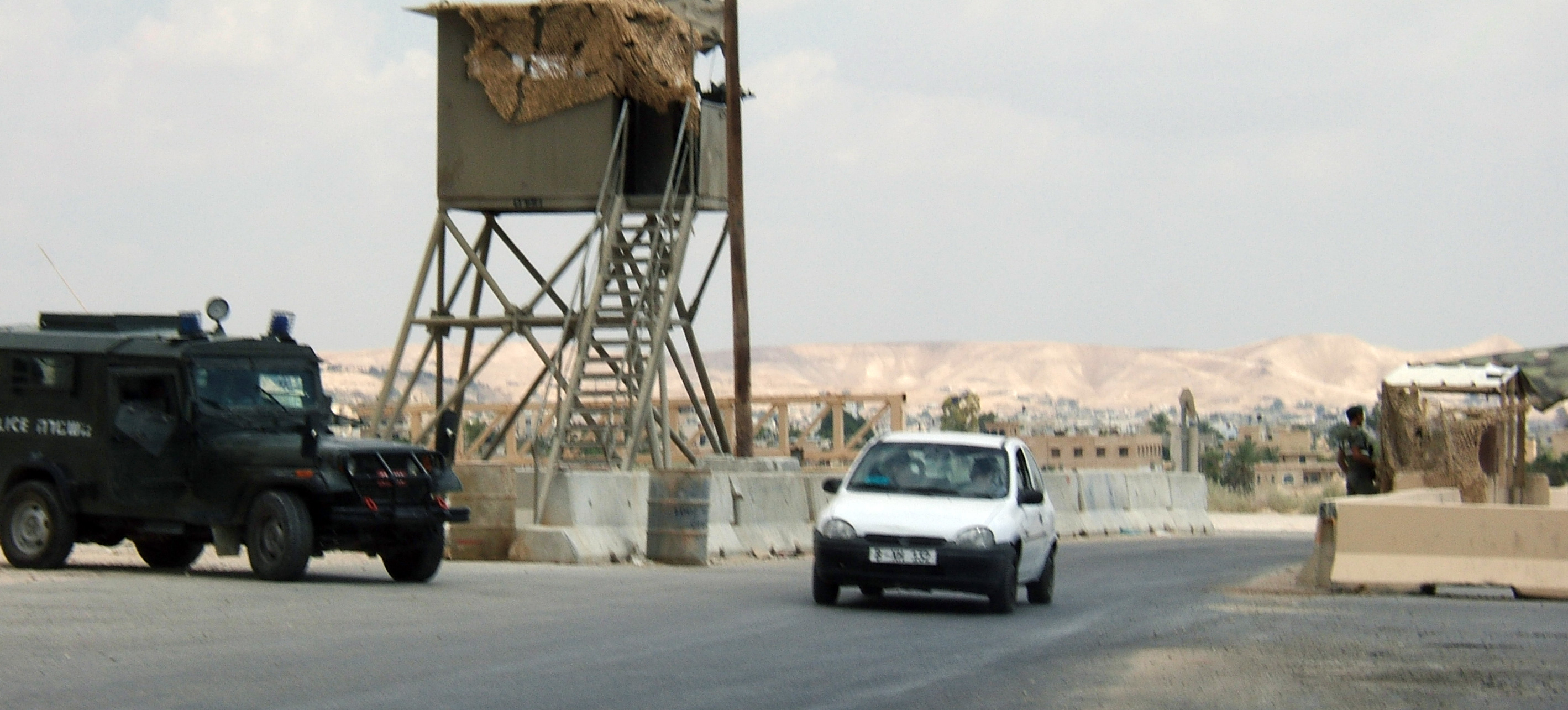
A checkpoint before entering Jericho, 2005

Israeli restrictions were tightened in 2007.

Route 4370, which has a concrete wall dividing the two sides, one designated for Israeli vehicles, the other for Palestinian. The wall is designed to allow Palestinians to pass north–south through Israeli-held land and facilitate the building of additional Jewish settlements in the Jerusalem neighbourhood.

==== Rail ====
As of February 2012, a plan for 475-kilometre rail network, establishing 11 new rail lines in the West Bank, was confirmed by Israeli Transportation Ministry. The West Bank network would include one line running through Jenin, Nablus, Ramallah, Jerusalem, Ma'aleh Adumim, Bethlehem, and Hebron. Another would provide service along the Jordanian border from Eilat to the Dead Sea, Jericho, and Beit She'an and from there toward Haifa in the west and also in a northeasterly direction. The proposed scheme also calls for shorter routes, such as between Nablus and Tul Karm in the West Bank, and from Ramallah to the Allenby Bridge crossing into Jordan.

==== Airports ====
The only airport in the West Bank is the Atarot Airport near Ramallah, which has been closed since 2001.

==== Crossing points to Jordan and Egypt ====
The Allenby Bridge, or 'King Hussein Bridge', is the main port for the Palestinians in the West Bank to cross the Jordanian borders. This crossing point is controlled by Israel since 1967. It was inaugurated on 11 December 2011 under the military order "175" entitled 'An order concerning transition station'. Later, Order '446' was issued which annexed the Damia Bridge crossing point to the Allenby Bridge as a commercial crossing point only. Goods were exported to Jordan, while the import was banned for security purposes.

In 1993, the Palestinian National Authority, according to Oslo Accord assigned by PLO and the Israeli government, became a partial supervisor over the Rafah Border Crossing to Gaza Strip. The Palestinian Authority was responsible for issuing passports to Palestinians in the West Bank and Gaza Strip. Israel remained the major responsible party for this crossing point. According to the agreement, Israel has the right to independently inspect luggage and to maintain security. In addition, it can prevent anyone from using the crossing.

==== Telecommunication ====
The Palestinian Paltel telecommunication companies provide communication services such as landline, cellular network, and Internet in the West Bank and Gaza Strip. Dialling code +970 is used in the West Bank and all over the Palestinian territories. Until 2007, the Palestinian mobile market was monopolized by Jawwal. A new mobile operator for the territories launched in 2009 under the name of Wataniya Telecom. The number of Internet users increased from 35,000 in 2000 to 356,000 in 2010.

== Demographics ==
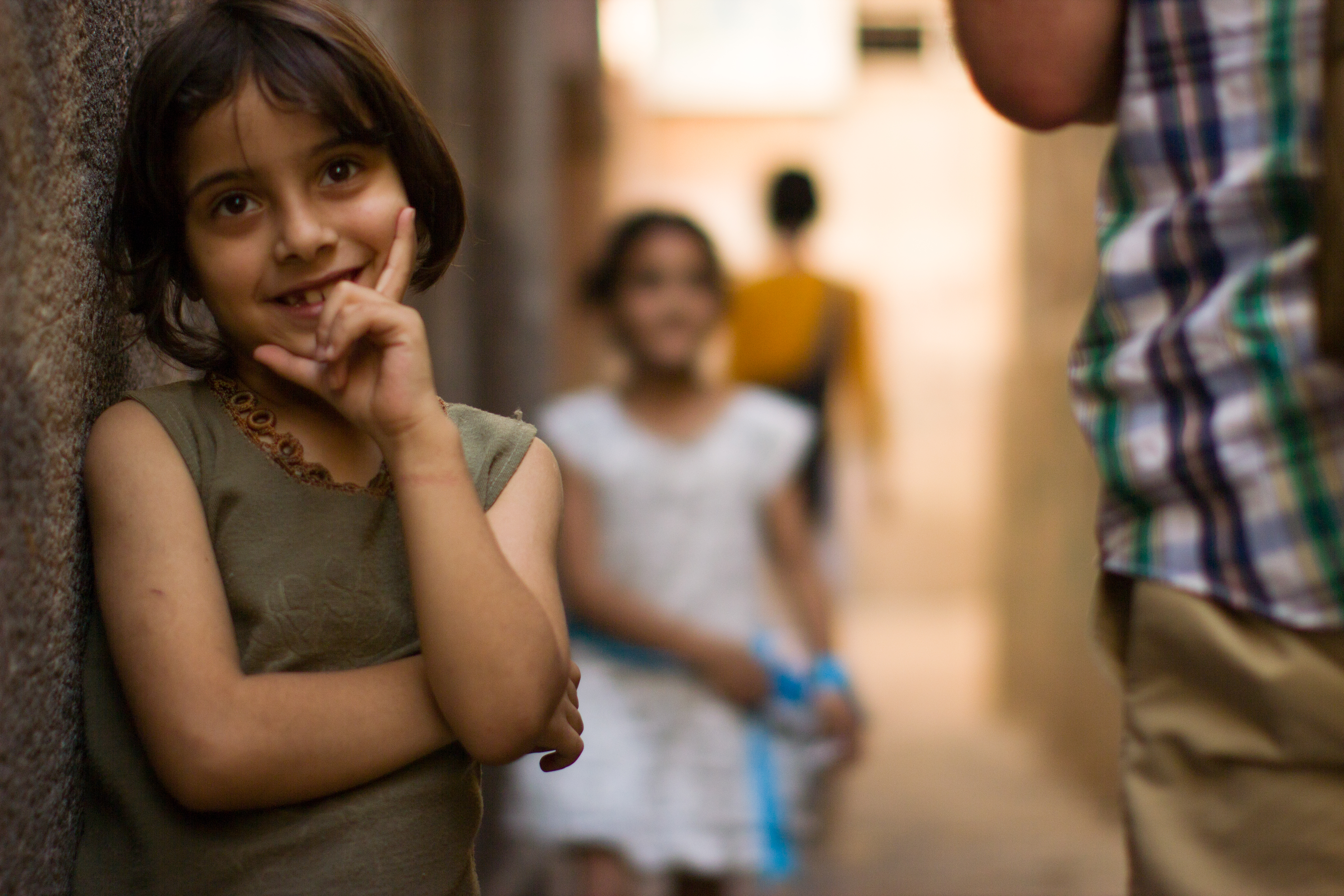
Palestinian girl in Nablus

In December 2007, an official census conducted by the Palestinian Authority found that the Palestinian Arab population of the West Bank, including East Jerusalem, was 2,345,000. However, the World Bank and American-Israeli Demographic Research Group identified a 32% discrepancy between first-grade enrollment statistics documented by the Palestinian Ministry of Education and Palestinian Central Bureau of Statistics (PCBS)' 2007 projections, with questions also raised about the PCBS' growth assumptions for the period 1997–2003. The Israeli Civil Administration put the number of Palestinians in the West Bank at 2,657,029 as of May 2012.

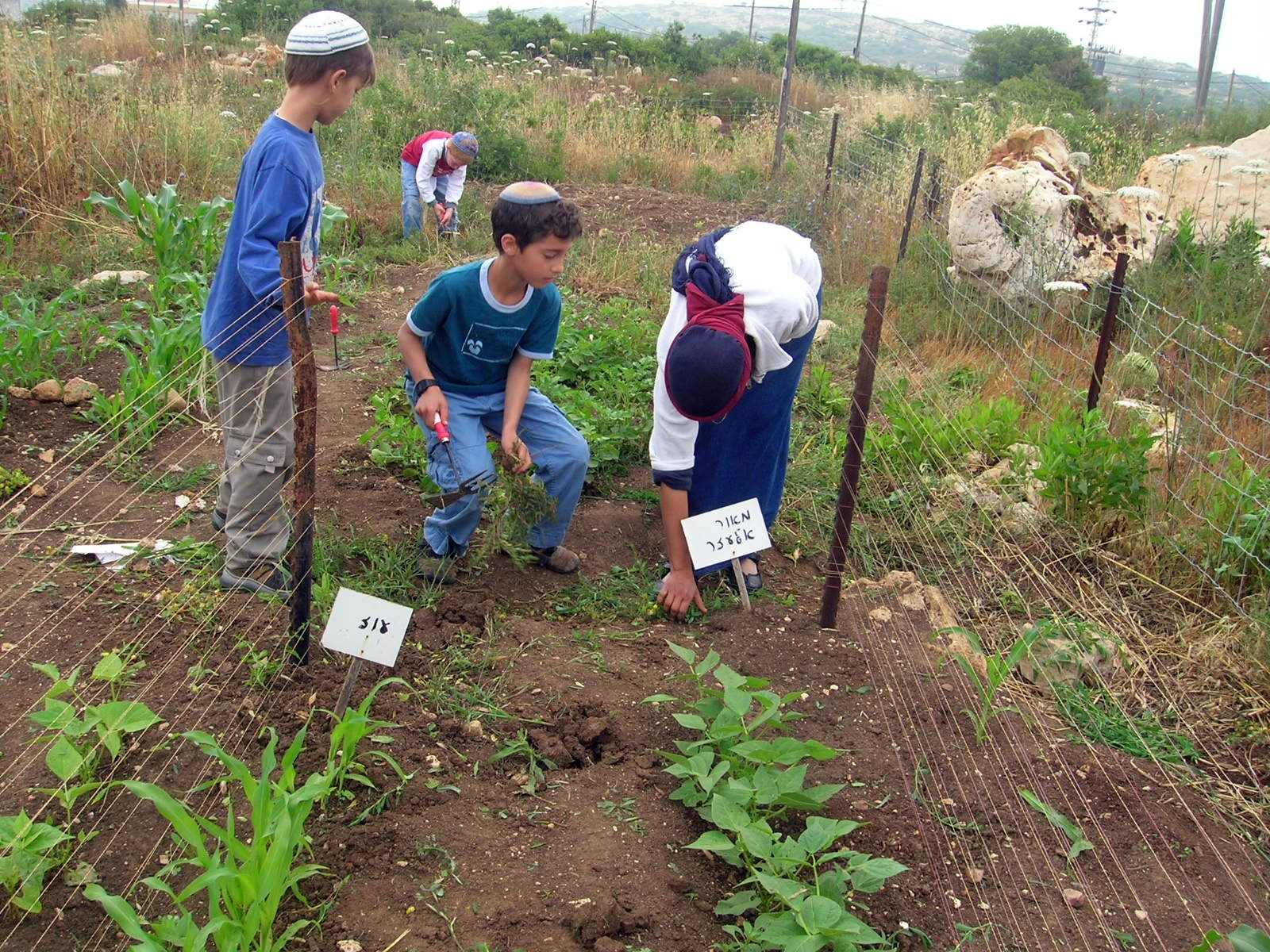
Jewish children in Tal Menashe.

In 2014, there were 389,250 Israeli settlers living in the West Bank, excluding East Jerusalem, as well as around 375,000 living in Israeli-annexed East Jerusalem. There are also small ethnic groups, such as the Samaritans living in and around Nablus, numbering in the hundreds.

As of October 2007, around 23,000 Palestinians in the West Bank worked in Israel every day, while another 9,200 worked in Israeli settlements. In addition, around 10,000 Palestinian traders from the West Bank were allowed to travel every day into Israel. By 2014, 92,000 Palestinians worked in Israel legally or illegally, twice as many as in 2010.

In 2008, approximately 30% of Palestinians or 754,263 persons living in the West Bank were refugees or descendants of refugees from villages and towns located in what became Israel during the 1948 Arab–Israeli War, according to UNRWA statistics. A 2011 EU report titled "Area C and Palestinian State Building" reported that before the Israeli occupation in 1967, between 200,000 and 320,000 Palestinians used to live in the Jordan Valley, 90% which is in Area C, but demolition of Palestinian homes and prevention of new buildings has seen the number drop to 56,000, 70% of which live in Area A, in Jericho. In a similar period, the Jewish population in Area C has grown from 1,200 to 310,000.

=== Major population centres ===
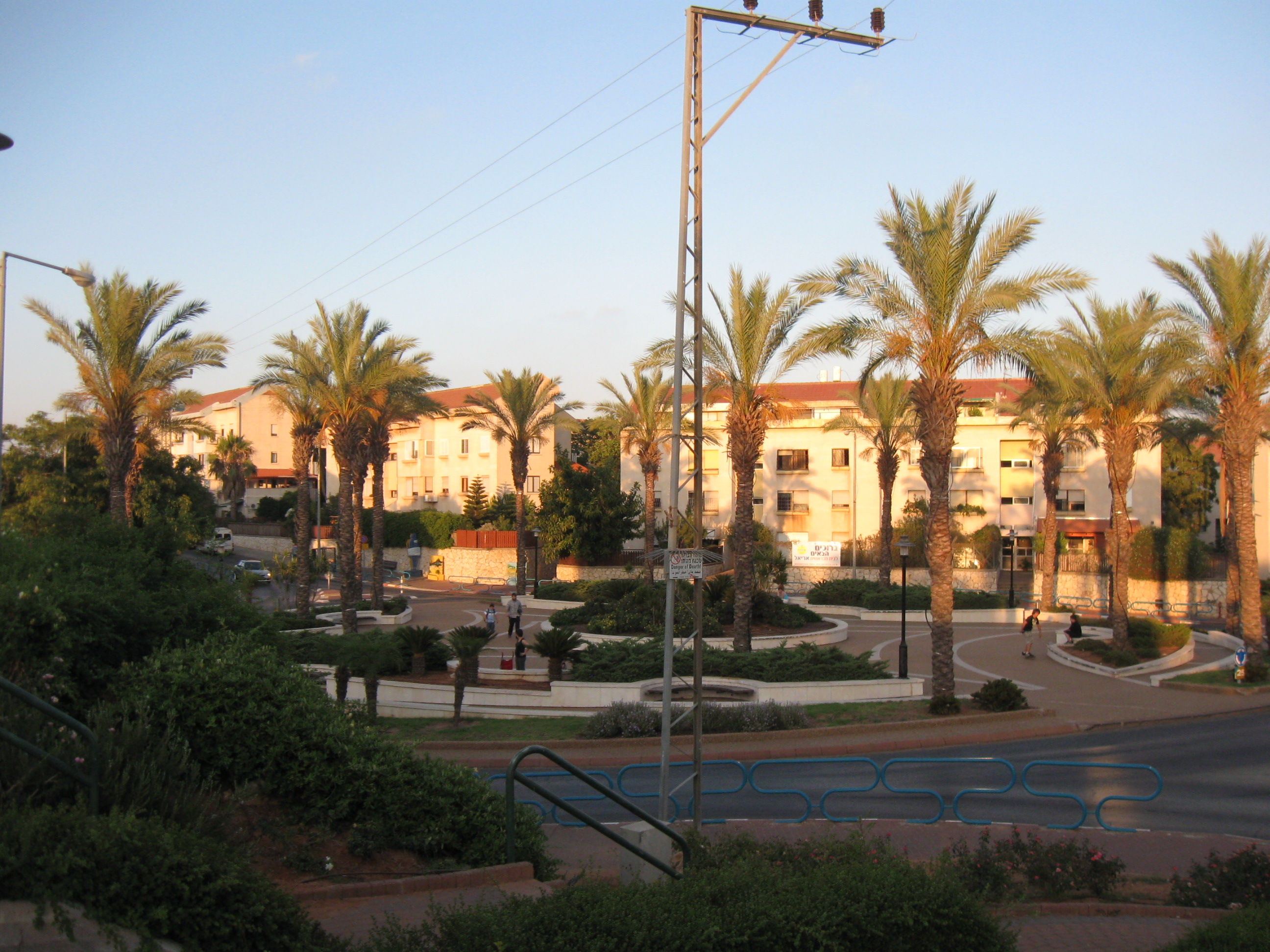
Settlement of Ariel

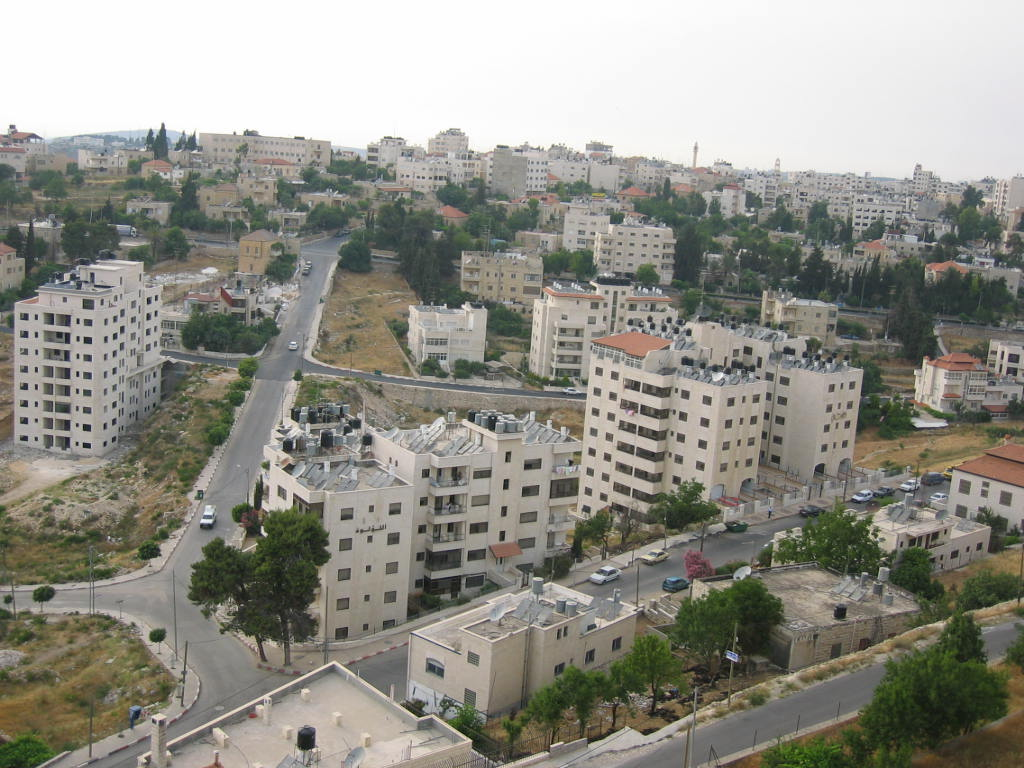
Residential neighbourhood of Ramallah

Centre	Population
East Jerusalem	542,400
Hebron (al-Khalil)	163,146
Nablus	136,132
Jenin	90,004
Tulkarm	51,300
Yattah	48,672
Modi'in Illit	48,600
Qalqilyah	41,739
Al-Bireh	38,202
Beitar Illit	37,600
Ma'ale Adummim	33,259
Ramallah	27,460
Bethlehem	25,266
Jericho	18,346
Ariel	17,700

The most densely populated part of the region is a mountainous spine, running north–south, where the cities of Jerusalem, Nablus, Ramallah, al-Bireh, Jenin, Bethlehem, Hebron, and Yattah are located as well as the Israeli settlements of Ariel, Ma'ale Adumim, and Beitar Illit. Ramallah, although relatively mid in population compared to other major cities as Hebron, Nablus, and Jenin, serves as an economic and political centre for the Palestinians. Near Ramallah the new city of Rawabi is under construction. Jenin in the extreme north and is the capital of north of the West Bank and is on the southern edge of the Jezreel Valley. Modi'in Illit, Qalqilyah, and Tulkarm are in the low foothills adjacent to the Israeli Coastal Plain, and Jericho and Tubas are situated in the Jordan Valley, north of the Dead Sea.

=== Ethnic cleansing ===
As part of "Operation Iron Wall" Israel forcibly removed 36,000 Palestinians from their homes in West Bank refugee camps in Tulkarem, Nur Shams, and Jenin in January and February 2025, according to a detailed investigation by Human Rights Watch. According to the report, these forced expulsions were the largest since the major expulsion of Palestinians in 1967, and constitute ethnic cleansing, war crimes, and crimes against humanity.

=== Religion ===
The population of the West Bank is 80–85% Muslim (mostly Sunni) and 12–14% Jewish. The remainder are 1–2.5% Christian (mostly Greek Orthodox), and others.

=== Education ===
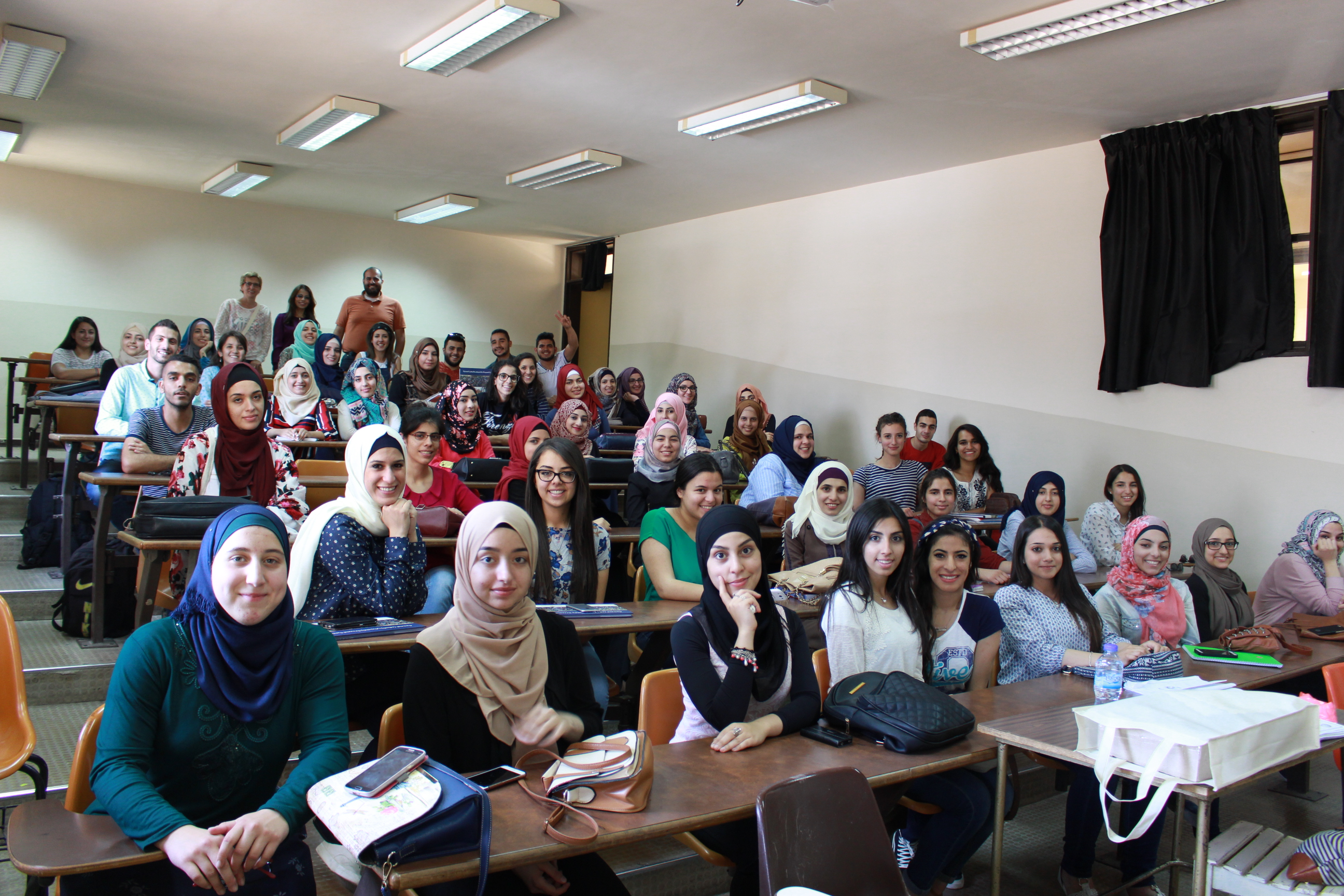
Palestinian students at Birzeit University in 2016

Seven universities are operating in the West Bank:

- Bethlehem University, a Roman Catholic institution of the Lasallian tradition partially funded by the Vatican, opened its doors in 1973.
- In 1975, Birzeit College (located in the town of Bir Zeit north of Ramallah) became Birzeit University after adding third- and fourth-year college-level programmes.
- An-Najah College in Nablus likewise became An-Najah National University in 1977.
- Hebron University was established as College of Shari'a in 1971 and became Hebron University in 1980.
- Al-Quds University was founded in 1995, unifying several colleges and faculties in and around East Jerusalem.
- In 2000, the Arab American University – the only private university in the West Bank – was founded outside of Zababdeh, with the purpose of providing courses according to the American system of education.
- Ariel University is located in the Israeli settlement of Ariel and was granted full university status on 17 July 2012. It was established in 1982.

Most universities in the West Bank have politically active student bodies, and elections of student council officers are normally along party affiliations. Although the establishment of the universities was initially allowed by the Israeli authorities, some were sporadically ordered closed by the Israeli Civil Administration during the 1970s and 1980s to prevent political activities and violence against the IDF. Some universities remained closed by military order for extended periods during years immediately preceding and following the first Palestinian Intifada, but have largely remained open since the signing of the Oslo Accords despite the advent of the Al-Aqsa Intifada (Second Intifada) in 2000.

The founding of Palestinian universities has greatly increased education levels among the population in the West Bank. According to a Birzeit University study, the percentage of Palestinians choosing local universities as opposed to foreign institutions has been steadily increasing; as of 1997, 41% of Palestinians with bachelor's degrees had obtained them from Palestinian institutions. According to UNESCO, Palestinians are one of the most highly educated groups in the Middle East "despite often difficult circumstances". The literacy rate among Palestinians in the West Bank and the Gaza Strip according to the Palestinian Central Bureau of Statistics (PCBS) is 94.6% for 2009.

== Culture ==
=== Television and radio ===
The Palestinian Broadcasting Corporation broadcasts from an AM station in Ramallah on 675 kHz; numerous local privately owned stations are also in operation. Most Palestinian households have a radio and TV, and satellite dishes for receiving international coverage are widespread. PalTel began implementing an initiative to provide ADSL broadband internet service to all households and businesses.

Israel's cable television company Hot, satellite television provider Yes, AM/FM radio broadcast stations, and public television stations all also operate in the West Bank. Broadband internet service by Bezeq's ADSL and by the cable company is available as well. The Al-Aqsa Voice broadcasts from Dabas Mall in Tulkarem at 106.7 FM. The Al-Aqsa TV station shares these offices.

== See also ==
- Israeli-occupied territories
- Palestinian territories
- Gaza Strip
- West Bank closures
