= Bug Multisystem =

Bug Multisystem (באג מולטיסיסטם) is an Israeli electronics retailer that sells computers, cellphones, video games, digital cameras and related equipment. As of 2026, the retailer had 55 stores nationwide.

== History ==
=== Early years ===
The company was founded by the Ira Rosenzweig and Nawit Resnik couple. Rosenzweig, an immigrant who recently arrived from the United States, wanted to learn computer programming for an Apple he had bought and ordered professional literature from the United States. Rosenzweig discovered that there was demand for the subject in Israel and began importing computer guides and software into the country. At the time, computers became a consumer object, taking into account the rise in the sales of personal computers. Its first store opened at the Dizengoff Center and, later, franchised stores opened in Jerusalem, Ramat HaSharon, Rehovot and Haifa. At founding time, it was named Bug Computers Ltd. and focused on the sale of IT books and software, even publishing books on computers in Hebrew.

In 1986, four years after founding Bug, the couple sold the stores to Moshe Raviv. Raviv expanded its activities, which enabled it to start selling hardware — computers and related equipment. In 1988, the chain had 12 stores, including one that sold computers to the corporate market. The company also started releasing video games, including games developed in Israel, and distribution rights to Sega's consoles. In 1993, it released the CD-ROM game Avish!, developed by four middle school students from Kiryat Ono.

=== 1990s ===
In 1996, Bug started distributing Microsoft's products to stores in Israel, in a total of 500 sales points, including Office Depot, Super Office, Toys "R" Us and Stimatzky. That same year, the retailer was acquired by Kardan Israel Group's Kardan Sahar. At the time of selling, it had 22 stores and its annual revenue was of approximately NIS 100 million. Kardan sold the retailer five years later, but at a loss of NIS 7 million. The buyer was Oded Modan's Modan Publishing House.

In 1998, it branched out into the communications market for the first time, marketing cellphones from the newly-founded Partner.

=== 2000s ===
In 2000, the company signed agreements to establish stores and sales points inside Hamashbir Lazarchan, Shekem and Skal Yashir's stores. These sales points closed a few years later. In 2003, it acquired the Atid Computers chain after said company was in the process of freezing its activities. The new combined chain, which took on Bug's identity, had 30 stores.

In 2005, the company started marketing multimedia products, such as MP3 players and speakers, as well as Motorola's Bluetooth products, such as earphones and car loudspeakers. In the same year, Bug started offering Bezeq International's high speed internet service.

In June 2008, it was revealed that Bug was the only retailer to present a bid to open a store at the Ben Gurion Airport, after the Skaal Group, owner of the franchise at the time, solicited the closure of its duty-free shop before the contract expires. For being the only bidder, it won the bid by default, and its store was inaugurated on 1 September 2008, replacing Skal's. At the same time, Bug also signed an import and distribution agreement with US tech giant Dell, as well as a collaboration with Cellcom, selling laptops at its stores with a mobile modem and internet package.

In June 2009, after a several year hiatus, Bug restared working with Partner by releasing internet, mobile modem and fixed telephony packages at its stores.

In November 2009, Bug was among the first retailers in Israel to adopt Black Friday in late November. Following Bug's initiative, other retailers adopted it.

In September 2009, Bug acquired the Handy store at the Dizengoff Center, as well as the rights to use the name "Handy", with the goal of creating a sub-brand concept that only sold laptops. The accessory brand Handy remained in the hands of permanece Ira and Nawit Rosenzweig, who founded the store in 2002 and were previously Bug's owners and founders.

=== 2010s onwards ===
In 2010, Bug started marketing Apple's iPad through parallel imports.

In October 2011, Bug won a bid from the Israeli Aviation Authority to operate two stores at the Ben Gurion Airport: a toy store and a kids store. These stores, respectively with 320 square meters and 70 square meters, opened in November 2011.

In 2012, the collaboration between Bug and Golan Telecom began, and its packages were now able to be bought at Bug's stores. In May 2016, this arrangement ended and it started to release mobile services using Pelephone's infrastructure using the Pmobile low-cost brand. In 2024, the chain started selling Golan Mobile's services again.

In December 2012, Bug lost the IAA bid to operate its electronics store at the Ben Gurion Airport, the winner of the new bid, ALM, replaced it in January 2013.

In August 2013, the Israel Tax Authority closed its three stores at the Ben Gurion Airport under suspicions that it was offering supposedly tax-free products for two years, although taxable, through the division of bills with high costs and packaging of products marked as tax-exempt.

In April 2014, the toy and kids' clothes stores Bug operated at the Ben Gurion airport shut down due to an IAA decision to end its contract with Bug, after it had a dispute with the authority. With this, Bug left the duty-free business.

In March 2015, it started releasing internet routers for XPhone.

In December 2016, Bug became Israel's official Apple reseller.

In early 2019, the company would start branching out into air purifiers, by recommendation of its president Adir Zvi.
