= Ooredoo Kuwait =

Kuwaiti telecommunications company

- Formerly: Wataniya Telecom (1999–2014)
- Company type: Public
- Industry: Telecommunications
- Founded: 12 October 1999; 26 years ago (as Wataniya Telecom); 26 May 2014; 12 years ago (as Ooredoo Kuwait)
- Headquarters: Kuwait, Kuwait City
- Key people: Abdulaziz Yacoup Al-Babtain
- Products: Communication services
- Website: www.ooredoo.com.kw

Ooredoo Kuwait, formerly known as Wataniya Telecom, is a telecommunications company in Kuwait owned by the Ooredoo group. Its operations began in December 1999 when it launched wireless services as the second operator in Kuwait. It provides mobile, broadband internet and corporate managed services.

It is the strongest performer in the local market, during the latest announcements, the revenue, EBITIDA growth and dividends per share scores the highest in comparison to the local Kuwaiti telecom market.
