= List of international call prefixes =

International dialing prefixes are used when dialing international telephone calls by telephone users. These prefixes are typically required only when dialling from a landline, while in GSM-compliant mobile phone (cell phone) systems, the symbol + before the destination country code may be used irrespective of the location of the telephone when dialing. The network operator provides the access codes automatically.

== Countries by international prefix ==
0 00 000 001 0011 009 00x 010 011 8~10

- 0
  - Samoa
- 00 – the recommended ITU prefix
  - Africa: all countries except Kenya, Nigeria, Tanzania, and Uganda
  - Asia: all countries except certain countries in Central, East, and Southeast Asia
  - Europe: all countries except Abkhazia, Belarus, Russia and South Ossetia
  - Middle East: all countries
  - North America: all countries not using NANP (Mexico, Greenland, St Pierre and Miquelon)
  - South America: all countries except Brazil, Colombia, Guyana and those using NANP
  - Oceania: all countries except Australia
- 000
  - Kenya (Note: Kenya, Tanzania and Uganda each can be called from the other two using special short codes: 005 to call Kenya, 006 to call Uganda and 007 to call Tanzania. The shortcode is followed directly by a local number.)
  - Singapore
  - Tanzania
  - Uganda
- 001
  - Guyana
  - Hong Kong (also 002 – circuit switched connection for fax/data transmission)
- 0011
  - Australia (including Australian External Territories)
- 009
  - Nigeria
- 00x, where x is a mandatory carrier selection code consisting of one or more digits
  - Brazil (see Telephone numbers in Brazil § International calls)
  - Cambodia (001 – Telecom Cambodia, 007 – Royal Telecom International)
  - Colombia (005, 007, 009)
  - Indonesia (001, 007, 008)
  - South Korea (see Telephone numbers in South Korea § International call carrier codes)
  - Taiwan (see Telephone numbers in Taiwan § International dialling)
  - Thailand (see Telephone numbers in Thailand § International dialling)
  - Mongolia (001, 002, 003, 008, 009)
- 010
  - Japan
- 011 – all countries and territories in the North American Numbering Plan:
  - American Samoa
  - Anguilla
  - Antigua and Barbuda
  - Bahamas
  - Barbados
  - Bermuda
  - British Virgin Islands
  - Canada
  - Cayman Islands
  - Dominica
  - Dominican Republic
  - Grenada
  - Guam
  - Jamaica
  - Micronesia
  - Montserrat
  - Northern Mariana Islands
  - Palau
  - Puerto Rico
  - Saint Kitts and Nevis
  - Saint Lucia
  - Saint Vincent and the Grenadines
  - Sint Maarten
  - Trinidad and Tobago
  - Turks and Caicos Islands
  - United States of America
  - United States Virgin Islands
- 8~10 (Note: "~" means "wait for the next dial tone". Reference: Jan Goyvaerts; Steven Levithan (2009). Regular Expressions Cookbook. O'Reilly. p. 224. ISBN 978-0-596-52068-7.)
  - Abkhazia
  - Belarus
  - Kazakhstan
  - Russia
  - South Ossetia
  - Tajikistan
  - Turkmenistan

== Countries using carrier selection codes ==
The following is a non-exhaustive list of countries that optionally allow for carrier selection in addition to using the standard prefix listed in the preceding section.

- 00xx, where xx is a two-digit carrier selection code:
  - Australia, alongside the standard prefix 0011 for the default carrier
    - 0014 – Primus
    - 0018 – Telstra
    - 0019 – Optus
    - A large number of carriers in the 14xx range
  - Hong Kong, alongside the standard prefixes 001 (voice) and 002 (fax/data) for the default carrier
    - 0030 – Hong Kong Broadband Network
    - 0050 – ComNet Telecom (HK) Limited
    - 0059 – HKC Network Ltd
    - 0060 – PCCW
    - 0070 – Wharf T&T
    - 0080 – Hutchison Telecom
    - 0090 – New World Telecommunications
- 0xx, where xx is a two-digit carrier selection code:
  - Israel, alongside the standard prefix 00 for the default carrier
    - 012 – 012 Smile
    - 013 – 013 NetVision
    - 014 – Bezeq International
    - 015 – Hallo 015
    - 016 – Golan Telecom
    - 017 – Hot Mobile
    - 018 – Xfone
    - 019 – Telzar
  - Singapore, alongside the standard prefix 000 for the default carrier
    - 001 – SingTel
    - 002 – M1
    - 008 – StarHub
    - 011
    - 013
    - 018
    - 019
    - 020
    - 021
- 10xx, where xx is a two-digit carrier selection code:
  - Georgia, alongside the standard prefix 00 for the default carrier
- 1xx0, where xx is a two-digit carrier selection code
  - Chile (see Carrier selection codes in Chile)
- 8~xx, where xx is a two-digit carrier selection code:
  - Russia, alongside the standard prefix 8~10 for the default carrier
    - 8~26 – Arctel
    - 8~27 – Synterra
    - 8~28 – Comstar
    - 8~56 – GoldenTelecom
    - 8~57 – Transtelecom
    - 8~58 – MTT
    - 8~59 – Orange Business Services
- 99x, where x is a carrier selection code:
  - Finland, alongside the standard prefix 00 for the default carrier, carrier selection code consisting of either a single digit (1–4, 6–9) or three digits (511–599)
    - 99 0 – Telia Finland Oyj
    - 99 1 – Elisa Oyj
    - 99 511 – Nettia Oy
    - 99 533 – DNA Oyj
    - 99 555 – DNA Oyj
    - 99 559 – Elisa Oyj
    - 99 577 – DNA Oyj
    - 99 599 – Nettia Oy
    - 99 9 – Elisa Oyj

== Historic international prefixes ==
The following are international call prefixes that were used in various countries sometime in the past but are no longer used.

- 0
  - Bahrain (now 00)
  - El Salvador (now 00)
  - Falkland Islands (now 00)
  - Malta (now 00)
  - Myanmar (now 00)
- 00
  - Cambodia (now 001)
  - Mongolia (now 001)
  - Sint Maarten (now 011)
  - Tanzania (now 000)
- 000
  - Rwanda (now 00)
- 001
  - Japan (now 010)
- 002
  - Paraguay (now 00)
- 0030
  - Hong Kong (CTI, which now uses 1666)
- 005
  - Singapore (now 001)
- 007
  - Malaysia (now 00)
- 009
  - Denmark, including Faroe Islands and Greenland (now 00)
  - Sweden (now 00)
- 010
  - United Kingdom (now 00)
- 05
  - Fiji (now 00)
  - Papua New Guinea (now 00)
- 06
  - East Germany (now Germany 00)
- 07~
  - Spain (now 00)
- 09
  - Namibia (now 00)
  - Netherlands (now 00)
  - South Africa (now 00)
- 095
  - Norway (now 00)
- 099
  - Guinea-Bissau (now 00)
- 101
  - Malawi (now 00)
- 110
  - Zimbabwe (now 00)
- 119
  - Cuba (now 00)
- 15
  - Chad (now 00)
- 16
  - Ireland (now 00)
  - Somalia (now 00)
- 19
  - Central African Republic (now 00)
  - France (now 00)
- 800
  - Estonia (now 00)
- 8~10 – former Soviet Union
  - Armenia (now 00)
  - Azerbaijan (now 00)
  - Estonia (now 00)
  - Georgia (now 00)
  - Kyrgyzstan (now 00)
  - Latvia (now 00)
  - Lithuania (now 00)
  - Moldova (now 00)
  - Ukraine (now 00)
  - Uzbekistan (now 00)
- 90
  - Burundi (now 00)
  - Iceland (now 00)
- 95 for NANP and 98 for the rest of the world
  - Mexico (now 00)
- 99
  - Bosnia and Herzegovina (now 00)
  - Croatia (now 00)
  - India (now 00)
  - Montenegro (now 00)
  - North Macedonia (now 00)
  - Serbia (now 00)
  - Slovenia (now 00)

== See also ==
- List of telephone country codes
- List of North American Numbering Plan area codes
- Public switched telephone network
