= Telephone numbers in mainland China =

Telephone numbers in Mainland of the People's Republic of China
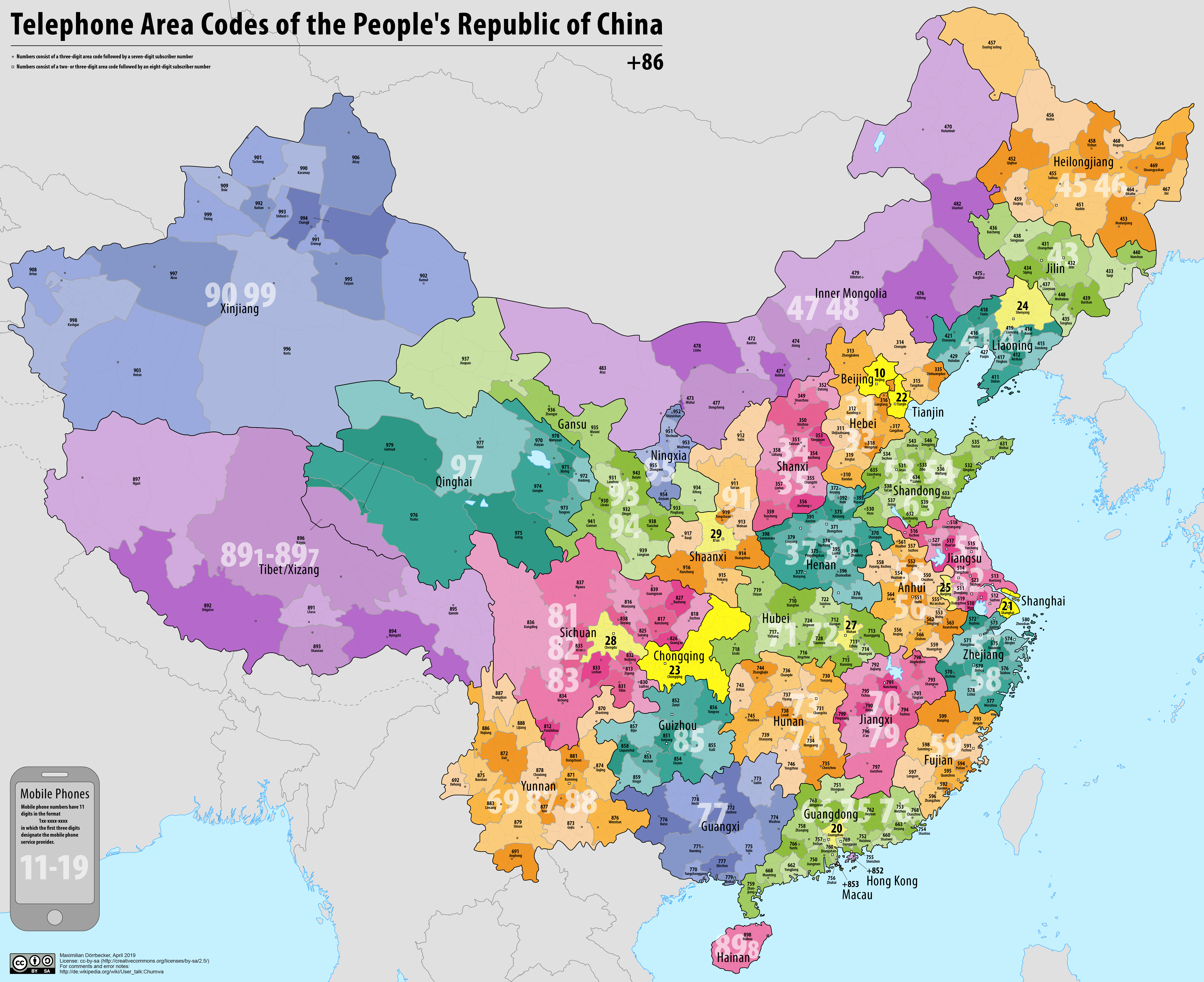
- Map of the prefix number
- Country: Mainland of the People's Republic of China
- Continent: Asia
- Regulator: Ministry of Industry and Information Technology
- Membership: E.164
- Numbering plan type: Open
- Country code: 86
- International access: 00
- Long-distance: 0

Telephone numbers in the mainland of the People's Republic of China are administered according to the Telecommunications Network Numbering Plan of China. The structure of telephone numbers for landlines and mobile service is different. Landline telephone numbers have area codes, whereas mobile numbers do not. In major cities, landline numbers consist of a two-digit area code followed by an eight-digit local number. In other places, landline numbers consist of a three-digit area code followed by a seven- or eight-digit local number. Mobile phone numbers consist of eleven digits.

Landline calls within the same area do not require the area code. Calls to other areas require dialing the trunk prefix 0 and the area code.

Hong Kong, Macau, and Taiwan are not part of this numbering plan, and use the calling codes 852, 853, and 886 respectively.

== Mobile phones ==
In mainland China, mobile phone numbers have eleven digits in the format 1xx-XXXX-XXXX (except for 140–144, which are 13-digit IoT numbers), in which the first three digits (13x to 19x) designate the mobile phone service provider.

Before GSM, mobile phones had 6-digit (later upgraded to 7-digit) numbers starting with nine. They had the same numbering format as fixed-line telephones. Those numbers were eventually translated into 1390xx9xxx, where xx were local identifiers.

The oldest China Mobile GSM numbers were ten digits long and started with 139 in 1994, the second oldest 138 in 1997, and 137, 136, 135 in 1999. The oldest China Unicom numbers started with 130 in 1995, the second oldest at 131 in 1998. Keeping the same number over time is somewhat associated with the stability and reliability of the owner. The 5th to the seventh digit sometimes relates to age and location.

China's mobile telephone numbers were changed from ten digits to eleven digits, with 0 added after 13x, and thus the HLR code became four-digit long to expand the capacity of the seriously fully crowded numbering plan.

In 2006, 15x numbers were introduced. In late 2008, 18x and 14x (for data plans or IoT) were introduced. In late 2013, 17x were introduced. In 2017, 16x and 19x were introduced.

In December 2016, each cell phone number was required to be consigned to a real name in mainland China.

In November 2010, MIIT has started the trial mobile number portability service in Tianjin and Hainan, in 2012 the trial has extended to Jiangxi, Hubei and Yunan provinces. On 10 November 2019, all provinces started accepting MNP requests for all mobile carriers, except for technical difficulties, the MVNO phones, satellite phones and IoT phones.

Mobile service carriers can be identified by the first three or four digits as follows:

| Prefix | Carrier | Network | | | |
| Prefix | Carrier | 2G | 3G | 4G | 5G |
|---|---|---|---|---|---|
| 10641 (13 digits) | China Unicom (VNO for IoT purposes) | N/A^{4} | WCDMA^{7} | LTE | NR |
| 130–132 | China Unicom | N/A^{4} | WCDMA^{7} | LTE | NR |
| 133 | China Telecom^{1} | N/A^{5} | | LTE | NR |
| 134(0–8) | China Mobile | GSM^{4} | N/A^{3} | LTE | NR |
| 1349 | Chinasat (operated by China Telecom) | Satellite | | | |
| 135–139 | China Mobile | GSM^{4} | N/A^{3} | LTE | NR |
| 140 (13 digits) | reserved for China Unicom (IoT), due to NR technical difficulties, no 1400(0–9) numbers will be provided | N/A | | | |
| 141 (13 digits) | China Telecom (IoT) currently only 1410(0–9) are used, the rest, 141(10–99) are reserved for future 5G IoT card plans | N/A^{5} | | LTE | NR |
| 142–143 (13 digits) | reserved for future IoT carriers | N/A | | | |
| 144 (13 digits) | China Mobile (IoT) currently only 1440(0–9) and 1441(0–9) are used, the rest, 144(20–99) are reserved for future 5G IoT card plans | GSM^{4} | N/A^{3} | LTE | NR |
| 145 | China Unicom (data card) only new TD-LTE, LTE-FDD, LTE-A or NR wireless network card users may got a new 145 number, but can also be used to connect 3G network | N/A^{4} | WCDMA^{7} | LTE | NR |
| 146 | China Unicom (IoT) | N/A^{4} | WCDMA^{7} | LTE | NR |
| 147 | China Mobile (data card); Used for "one SIM with dual-number" service of CMHK in Mainland | GSM^{4} | N/A^{3} | LTE | NR |
| 148 | China Mobile (IoT) | GSM^{4} | N/A^{3} | LTE | NR |
| 149 | China Telecom (data card) only new NR wireless network card users may got a new 149 number, but can also be used to connect 4G network | N/A^{5} | | LTE | NR |
| 150–152 | China Mobile | GSM^{4} | N/A^{3} | LTE | NR |
| 153 | China Telecom^{1} | N/A^{5} | | LTE | NR |
| 154 | reserved for future mobile carriers | N/A | | | |
| 155–156 | China Unicom | N/A^{4} | WCDMA^{7} | LTE | NR |
| 157 | China Mobile also used for CM wireless landlines | GSM^{4} | N/A^{3} | LTE | NR |
| 158–159 | China Mobile | GSM^{4} | N/A^{3} | LTE | NR |
| 161(0–8) | reserved for future mobile carriers | N/A | | | |
| 1619 | China Satellite Network Group | Satellite | | | |
| 162 | China Telecom (VNO) | N/A^{5} | | LTE | NR |
| 164 | reserved for future mobile carriers | N/A | | | |
| 165 | China Mobile (VNO) | GSM^{4} | N/A^{3} | LTE | NR |
| 166 | China Unicom | N/A^{4} | WCDMA^{7} | LTE | NR |
| 167 | China Unicom (VNO) | N/A^{4} | WCDMA^{7} | LTE | NR |
| 170(0–2) | China Telecom (VNO) | N/A^{5} | | LTE | NR |
| 1703 | China Mobile (VNO) | GSM^{4} | N/A^{3} | LTE | NR |
| 1704 | China Unicom (VNO) | N/A^{4} | WCDMA^{7} | LTE | NR |
| 170(5–6) | China Mobile (VNO) | GSM^{4} | N/A^{3} | LTE | NR |
| 170(7–9) | China Unicom (VNO) | N/A^{4} | WCDMA^{7} | LTE | NR |
| 171 | China Unicom (VNO) | N/A^{4} | WCDMA^{7} | LTE | NR |
| 172 | China Mobile (IoT) Used for "one SIM with dual-number" service of CTM in Mainland | GSM^{4} | N/A^{3} | LTE | NR |
| 173 | China Telecom | N/A^{5} | | LTE | NR |
| 174(00–05) | Tiantong (operated by China Telecom) | Satellite | | | |
| 174(06–12) | MIIT Emergency Communication Support Center | emergency mobile call | | | |
| 174(13–89) | reserved for satellite phones | N/A | | | |
| 1749 | Inmarsat^{2} | Satellite | | | |
| 175–176 | China Unicom | N/A^{4} | WCDMA^{7} | LTE | NR |
| 177 | China Telecom | N/A^{5} | | LTE | NR |
| 178 | China Mobile | GSM^{4} | N/A^{3} | LTE | NR |
| 180–181 | China Telecom | N/A^{5} | | LTE | NR |
| 182–184 | China Mobile | GSM^{4} | N/A^{3} | LTE | NR |
| 185–186 | China Unicom | N/A^{4} | WCDMA^{7} | LTE | NR |
| 187–188 | China Mobile | GSM^{4} | N/A^{3} | LTE | NR |
| 189–191 | China Telecom | N/A^{5} | | LTE | NR |
| 192 | China Broadnet | N/A | | LTE^{6} | NR |
| 193 | China Telecom | N/A^{5} | | LTE | NR |
| 194 | reserved for future mobile carriers | N/A | | | |
| 195 | China Mobile | GSM^{4} | N/A^{3} | LTE | NR |
| 196 | China Unicom | N/A^{4} | WCDMA^{7} | LTE | NR |
| 197–198 | China Mobile | GSM^{4} | N/A^{3} | LTE | NR |
| 199 | China Telecom | N/A^{5} | | LTE | NR |

1. China Unicom before 2009
2. Operated by China Transport Telecommunication Information Group Co., Ltd.
3. TD-SCDMA networks deprecated by China Mobile in 2020
4. China Unicom finalize deprecated the GSM networks in 2021. A plan to deprecate GSM by China Mobile announced in 2023, scheduled to shut down in 2025
5. CDMA2000 1x Ev-Do networks deprecated in 2022, and CDMA2000 1x RTT in 2024
6. LTE compatibility of China Broadnet SIM cards only available on Apple iOS devices
7. WCDMA networks are being deprecated by China Unicom since 2023

1G TACS networks were provided by China Telecom since 1987, operations transferred to China Mobile in 1999, the year China Mobile established, 1G shut down in 2001.

== Calling formats ==
To call phone numbers in China one of the following formats is used:

- For fixed phones:

xxx xxxx | xxxx xxxx Calls within the same area code

0yyy xxx xxxx | 0yyy xxxx xxxx Calls from other areas within China

+86 yyy xxx xxxx | +86 yyy xxxx xxxx Calls from outside China

- For mobile phones:

1nn xxxx xxxx Calls to mobile phones within China

+86 1nn xxxx xxxx Calls to mobiles from outside China

== Area 1 – Capital Operation Center ==
The prefix one is used exclusively by the national capital, Beijing Municipality.

- Beijing – 10 (formerly 1, abolished after GSM was introduced, to avoid conflict with mobile phone numbers with prefix 0 added (e.g. 0139-xxxx-xxxx))

== Area 2 – Country Communication System Operating Center ==
These are area codes for the municipalities of Shanghai, Tianjin, and Chongqing, as well as several major cities with early access to telephones. These cities have upgraded to an 8-number system in the past decade.

All telephone numbers are 8-digit in these areas.

- Guangzhou – 20
- Shanghai – 21
- Tianjin – 22
- Chongqing – 23 ^{1}
- Shenyang, Tieling, Fushun, Benxi – 24 ^{2}
- Nanjing – 25
- Wuhan, Huarong District of Ezhou – 27
- Chengdu, Meishan, Ziyang – 28 ^{3}
- Xi'an, Xianyang – 29 ^{4}

1 – Formerly 811 in urban area and 814 in Yongchuan, both abolished on 9 August 1997; 819 for Wanxian and 810 for Fuling and Qianjiang, abolished on 28 November 1998.
2 – Formerly 410 for Tieling and 413 for Fushun, abolished on 28 August 2011; 414 for Benxi, abolished on 24 May 2014.
3 – Formerly 832, 833, abolished 2010.
4 – Formerly 910, abolished 2006.

It is still unclear whether 26 will be provided or not, some local materials say that it is reserved for Taiwan (especially its capital Taipei), but currently they use +886. Some proposals from planned independent cities (Chinese: 计划单列市) to get rights to operate 026 were also unsuccessful.

== Area 3 – Northern China Operation Center ==
These are area codes for the provinces of Hebei, Shanxi and Henan.

=== Henan – 37x 39x ===

_{1 – Formerly 378, abolished on 26 October 2013.}
_{2 – Formerly 397 for 7 east counties, abolished on 20 October 2005.}

== Area 4 – Northeastern China Operation Center ==
These are area codes for the autonomous region of Inner Mongolia, and the provinces in Northeast China (Liaoning, Jilin, and Heilongjiang). Additionally, numbers starting 400 are shared-pay (callers are charged local rate anywhere in the country) numbers.

=== Jilin – 43x 44x ===

_{1 – Hunchun formerly 440, abolished in} _{16 September 2006}

_{2 – Meihekou, Liuhe, Huinan formerly 448, abolished on 16 September 2006}

=== Heilongjiang – 45x 46x ===

_{1 -Acheng formerly 450, abolished.}
_{2 – Includes Jiagedaqi and Songling, where considered part of Inner Mongolia by de jure}

=== Inner Mongolia – 47x 48x ===

_{1 – Jiagedaqi and Songling are de facto under the administration of the Daxing'anling
Prefecture, uses 457.}

== Area 5 – Eastern China Operating Center ==
These are area codes for the provinces of Jiangsu, Shandong (predominantly), Anhui, Zhejiang and Fujian.

=== Jiangsu – 51x 52x ===
All telephone numbers are 8-digit in Jiangsu.

_{1 – Changshu, Kunshan, Taicang, Wujiang and Zhangjiagang are formerly 520, abolished on 20 April 2002.}

=== Anhui – 55x 56x ===

_{1 – Formerly 565 for Chaohu prefectural city era (i.e. before 2011), later split as: Hefei's 551 for Juchao district (now county-level Chaohu) and Lujiang county, Wuhu's 553 for Wuwei and Shenxiang Town of He county (now part of Jiujiang district), and Ma'anshan's 555 for He county (except Shenxiang) and Hanshan county.}
_{2 – Split from Fuyang in 2000, no new area code allocated.}

=== Fujian – 59x 50x ===

_{1 – Kinmen, Matsu, and Wuchiu are under Taiwanese control, and hence use international calling code of +886.}

== Area 6 – Supplement for Shandong(63x), Guangdong(66x), Yunnan(69x) ==
All area codes with prefix 6 were assigned in recent years. This prefix (+866) previously was reserved for Taiwan, which is now assigned (+886).

=== Shandong – 63x ===
While most areas in Shandong use the prefix 53x 54x, some sites also use the prefix 6.

- Weihai – 631
- Zaozhuang – 632
- Rizhao – 633
- Liaocheng – 635

Laiwu was using 634, now merged to Jinan's 531, former numbers were re-prefixed as 5317 when merging.

=== Guangdong – 66x ===
While most areas in Guangdong use the prefixes 75x and 76x, some sites also use the prefix 6. The provincial capital Guangzhou uses code 20.

- Shanwei – 660
- Yangjiang – 662
- Jieyang – 663
- Maoming – 668

Chaoyang county-level city was using 661, now changed to 754 after split to Chaoyang and Chaonan districts and join Shantou.

=== Yunnan – 69x ===
While most areas in Yunnan use the prefix 87x and 88x, a couple of areas also use the prefix 6.

- Xishuangbanna – 691
- Dehong – 692

== Area 7 – Central-Southern China Operating Center ==
These are area codes for the central provinces of Hubei, Hunan, Guangdong (predominantly), Jiangxi, and the autonomous region of Guangxi.

=== Hubei – 71x 72x ===

_{20 – except Huarong district which uses Wuhan's 27.}

=== Hunan – 73x 74x ===

_{21 – Formerly 733, abolished.}
_{22 – Formerly 732, abolished.}

=== Guangdong – 75x 76x ===

_{23 – Shunde formerly 765, abolished.}

=== Guangxi – 77x 78x ===

_{24 – Split from Wuzhou Prefecture, original area code inherited.}
_{25 – Split from Liuzhou Prefecture, original area code inherited.}
_{26 – Split from Yulin Prefecture, original area code inherited.}
_{27 – Split from Nanning Prefecture, original area code inherited.}

== Area 8 -Southwestern China Operating Center ==
These are area codes for the provinces of Sichuan, Hainan, Guizhou, Yunnan (predominantly) and the autonomous region of Tibet.

=== Guizhou – 85x 86x ===

_{28 – Formerly 852, 853, abolished 2014.}

=== Yunnan – 87x 88x ===

_{29 – Dongchuan formerly 881, incorporated into 871}
_{30 – also de facto used by Wa State of Myanmar}

=== Hainan – 898 ===
All telephone numbers are 8-digit in Hainan.

_{Formerly (before 2001), Sanya, Wuzhishan, Lingshui, Ledong, Baoting and Qiongzhong were 899, Danzhou, Dongfang, Lingao, Baisha and Changjiang were 890.}

== Area 9 – Northwestern China Operating Center ==
These are area codes for northwestern regions including the provinces of Shaanxi, Gansu and Qinghai, as well as the autonomous regions of Ningxia and Xinjiang.

=== Gansu – 93x 94x ===

_{31 – Shared area code due to small size.}

=== Qinghai – 97x 98x ===

_{32 – Area under the administration of Golmud uses 979, other landlines within the prefecture use 977.}

=== Xinjiang – 99x 90x ===

_{33 – except Wusu and Dushanzi District which use Kuytun's 992.}
_{34 – except Shawan county which uses Shihezi's 993, and Hoboksar county which uses Karamay's 990.}

== Emergency numbers ==
From within Mainland China, the following emergency numbers are used:

- 110 – Police (12110 for SMS to police, not for calling, 95110 for maritime policies (Note: +86–10-68995110 when located at EEZs or public seas, where mobile signals are unable to provide), 96110 to report frauds)
- 119 – Fire brigade (12119 for forest fire in some regions)
- 120 – Ambulance
- 122 – Traffic accident (incorporated into 110 in some cities) (12122 on expressways)
- 999 – Privately operated ambulance (Beijing only, calls outside Beijing is 010-999)

In most cities, the emergency numbers assist in Mandarin Chinese and English.

Starting from 2012 in Shenzhen, an implemented system upgrade to unify three emergency reporting services into one number, 110. A similar approach is being installed in more cities in China to make them more convenient.

As 112, 911, and 999 (except Beijing) are not official emergency numbers in China, when dialing them, a recording message is played about correction in Chinese and English twice, but no services are automatically redirected:

- China Mobile & China Broadcom (include contract phones without SIM cards inserted, even dialed 110/119/120/122): For police dial 110, to report the fire dial 119, for an ambulance dial 120, to report the traffic accident dial 122. But when dialing 999 outside Beijing, and without 010 prefix: The number is incorrect, please check and dial again.
- China Unicom (include contract phones without SIM cards inserted, even dialed 110/119/120/122): Hello, please dial 110 for police, 119 for fire, 120 for ambulance, 122 for traffic accident, and dial area code before 112 for fixed phone obstacle.
- China Telecom (include contract phones without SIM cards inserted, even dialed 110/119/120/122): "Sorry, the number you've dialed is not correct, please check it and redial."
- Non-contract phones without SIM cards inserted: "Sorry, you didn't apply for this service."

== Others ==
From within Mainland China, the following special numbers are used:

- 100xx – Telecommunications Customer Service
  - 10000 for China Telecom, formerly 1000
  - 10010 for China Unicom, 10015 for auditing CU's services, formerly 1001
  - 10020–10049 for VNOs
  - 10086 for China Mobile (formerly 1860), 10050 for Tietong, 10080 for auditing CM's services, 1008611 for directly checking phone bills
  - 10096 for China Tower
  - 10099 for China Broadnet
- 106 – SMS access code
- 11185 – Post (11183 for their EMS)
- 114 – Directory assistance, operated by China Unicom for the northern 10 provinces, and China Telecom for the southern 21 provinces. China Unicom also operates 116114, and China Telecom 118114 that provide the same service as 114.
- 116xxx – Premium service of China Unicom (e.g. 116114)
- 118xxx – Premium service of China Telecom (e.g. 118114)
- 12114 – SMS name and address standard trial platform, not for calling
- 12117 – Speaking clock
- 12121 – Weather
- 12123 – Traffic police services
- 123xx – Government service, 12345 is a general hotline for all services below, that may be transited by 12345 operators upon kind of requests:

12303 – proposals (Note: SMS only, calling 12345 for this purpose will be hung up, with a SMS instruction returned)
12305 – SPB post appeals (Note: calling center merged with 12345, but numbers and service seats still work)
12306 – railway services
(10-)12308 – MFA Consular assistance (Note: +86–10-65612308 for backup number, which used for cannot calling 12308 due to overseas telecommunication network problems)
12309 – SPP reports
12310 – CIOC reports
12313 – tobacco reports
12314 – water reports
12315 – consumer reports (Note: calling center and seats merged with 12345, but numbers still work)
12316 – agricultural services
(10-)12317 – poverty helps
12318 – cultural reports
12319 – urban development services
12320 – health services
12321 – MIIT Internet disinfos and spam reports
12323 – MNR maritime report
12325 – food audit
12326 – CAAC audit
12327 – NRA audit
12328 – transportation illegal reports
12329 – housing fund services
12333 – MHRSS services
(10-)12335 – MoC Multinational corporation reports
12337 – CPLAC anti-blacks
12338 – women helps
12339 – MSS reports
12340 – statistics (Note: remote users are only able to receive phones from 12340, they can't directly call this number)
12348 – MoJ legal services and aids
12350 – MEM safety reports
12351 – ACFTU workers' helps
12355 – CYL Adolescence services
12356 – NHC Psychological assistance
12360 – custom services
12361 – PDCCP Xuexi Qiangguo
12363 – PBC financial reports
12366 – tax services
12367 – immigration services
12368 – court services
12369 – environment reports
(10-)12370 – MHRSS Civil services
12371 – ODCCP community member consult
12377 – CAC Internet illegal and disinfo reports
12378 – NFRA bank & insurance reports
(10-)12379 – MEM emergency situation info release
12380 – ODCCP reports
12381 – MIIT public services
12385 – disabled services
12386 – CSRC Investor services
12388 – CCDI and NSC reports
12389 – MPS reports
12390 – anti-pornography, illegal and copyvio publishing reports
12393 – NHSA services
12395 – MSA Shipwrecking helps
12398 – energy audits

- 124x – Carrier Identification Code (formerly 190/196/197, abolished in 2018, to create space for mobile phone numbers.)
- 125xx – Premium service of China Mobile (e.g. 12580 for China Mobile's Directory assistance)
- 179xx + target number followed – VoIP (e.g. 17901–133-0000–0000, 1790 for China Telecom, 1791 for China Unicom, and 1795 for China Mobile)
- 400 xxx xxxx, 800 xxx xxxx – business numbers
  - Differences: bills for 400 numbers are paid by both originating and terminating callers, and support calling from both landlines and mobile phones (usually 400–1/7 operate by China Mobile, 400–0/6 operate by China Unicom, 400–8/9 operate by China Telecom); bills for 800 numbers are just paid by terminating callers, but for non-landline users, mostly only China Telecom mobile phones may call 800 phones, because nearly all 800 phones are operated by China Telecom
  - 400-881-0000 for auditing China Telecom's services
- 95xxx(xxx), 96xxx(xxx) – enterprise public institution's consumer services, include but not only bank, insurance, public utility, etc. for example:
  - 95588 – Industrial and Commercial Bank of China (ICBC)
  - 95105105 or 96006 – railway ticket services

=== Former ===
- 20x (mainly 200 and 201) – was used for IC telephone service, to be reserved for mobile phones

== International Access Code ==
The international access code from the PRC is 00. This must also be used for calls to Taiwan, Hong Kong and Macau from the Mainland China, together with their separate international codes, as follows:

| place | Prefix |
|---|---|
| (All countries) | 00 CountryCode AreaCode SubscriberCode |
| Hong Kong | 00 852 xxxx xxxx |
| Macau | 00 853 xxxx xxxx |
| Taiwan | 00 886 xxx xxx xxx |
| NANP | 00 1 xxx xxx xxxx |
| UK | 00 44 xxxxxxxxxx |
| Japan | 00 81 xxxxxxxxx |

== See also ==
- Telecommunications in China
- Telephone numbers in Hong Kong
- Telephone numbers in Macau
- Toll-free telephone number, China
