= Telephone numbers in Asia =

Asian telephone numbers

The prefixes in Asia start with one of 2,3,6,7,8,9

Telephone numbers in Asia have the most possible prefixes of any continent on Earth: 2, 3, 6, 7, 8, 9. Below is a list of country calling codes for various states and territories in Asia.

== States and territories with country calling codes ==
Country name	Region	Country Code	International Call Prefix	Dialing plan	Trunk prefix	Main article
Afghanistan	9	+93	00		0	Telephone numbers in Afghanistan
Armenia	3	+374	00		0	Telephone numbers in Armenia
Azerbaijan	9	+994	00		0	Telephone numbers in Azerbaijan
Bahrain	9	+973	00			Telephone numbers in Bahrain
Bangladesh	8	+880	00		0	Telephone numbers in Bangladesh
Bhutan	9	+975	00			Telephone numbers in Bhutan
British Indian Ocean Territory	2	+246	00			Telephone numbers in the British Indian Ocean Territory
Brunei	6	+673	00	No area codes		Telephone numbers in Brunei
Cambodia	8	+855	00	Open	0	Telephone numbers in Cambodia
China	8	+86	00		0	Telephone numbers in China
Cyprus	3	+357	00			Telephone numbers in Cyprus
Egypt	2	+20	00		0	Telephone numbers in Egypt
Georgia	9	+995	00		0	Telephone numbers in Georgia
Hong Kong	8	+852	001	No area codes		Telephone numbers in Hong Kong
India	9	+91	00		0	Telephone numbers in India
Indonesia	6	+62	00x, 01xxx (VoIP)	Open	0	Telephone numbers in Indonesia
Iran	9	+98	00		0	Telephone numbers in Iran
Iraq	9	+964	00		0	Telephone numbers in Iraq
Israel	9	+972	00, 01x		0	Telephone numbers in Israel
Japan	8	+81	010		0	Telephone numbers in Japan
Jordan	9	+962	00		0	Telephone numbers in Jordan
Kazakhstan	7	+7	8~10		8	Telephone numbers in Kazakhstan
North Korea	8	+850	00, 99		0	Telephone numbers in North Korea
South Korea	8	+82	00 + carrier code		0	Telephone numbers in South Korea
Kuwait	9	+965	00			Telephone numbers in Kuwait
Kyrgyzstan	9	+996	00		0	Telephone numbers in Kyrgyzstan
Laos	8	+856	100	Open	0	Telephone numbers in Laos
Lebanon	9	+961	00		0	Telephone numbers in Lebanon
Macau	8	+853	00			Telephone numbers in Macau
Malaysia	6	+60	00	Open	0	Telephone numbers in Malaysia
Maldives	9	+960	00			Telephone numbers in the Maldives
Mongolia	9	+976	001		0	Telephone numbers in Mongolia
Myanmar	9	+95	00	Open	0	Telephone numbers in Myanmar
Nepal	9	+977	00		0	Telephone numbers in Nepal
Oman	9	+968	00			Telephone numbers in Oman
Pakistan	9	+92	00		0	Telephone numbers in Pakistan
State of Palestine	9	+970	00		0	Telephone numbers in Palestine
Philippines	6	+63	00	Open	0	Telephone numbers in the Philippines
Qatar	9	+974	00			Telephone numbers in Qatar
Russia	7	+7	8~10	Open	8	Telephone numbers in Russia
Saudi Arabia	9	+966	00		0	Telephone numbers in Saudi Arabia
Singapore	6	+65	001, 002, 008	No area codes		Telephone numbers in Singapore
Sri Lanka	9	+94	00	Open	0	Telephone numbers in Sri Lanka
Syria	9	+963	00		0	Telephone numbers in Syria
Taiwan	8	+886	002, 005, 006, 007, 009, 019	Open	0	Telephone numbers in Taiwan
Tajikistan	9	+992	8~10			Telephone numbers in Tajikistan
Thailand	6	+66	001, 00x	Closed with 0	0	Telephone numbers in Thailand
Timor-Leste	6	+670	00	Closed		Telephone numbers in Timor-Leste
Turkey	9	+90	00		0	Telephone numbers in Turkey
Turkmenistan	9	+993	8~10		8	Telephone numbers in Turkmenistan
United Arab Emirates	9	+971	00		0	Telephone numbers in the United Arab Emirates
Uzbekistan	9	+998	00			Telephone numbers in Uzbekistan
Vietnam	8	+84	00	Open	0	Telephone numbers in Vietnam
Yemen	9	+967	00		0	Telephone numbers in Yemen

== States and territories without a separate country calling code ==
Country name	Country Code	International Call Prefix	Main article
Abkhazia	+995 44, +7 840, +7 940	—	Telephone numbers in Abkhazia
Christmas Island	+61 8 9164	—	Telephone numbers in Christmas Island
Cocos (Keeling) Islands	+61 8 9162	—	Telephone numbers in the Cocos (Keeling) Islands
Northern Cyprus	+90 392	—	Telephone numbers in Northern Cyprus
South Ossetia	+995	—	Telephone numbers in South Ossetia

== See also ==
- Telephone numbering plan
- National conventions for writing telephone numbers
- List of country calling codes
- List of international call prefixes
