= Telephone numbers in Oman =

- Country: Oman
- Continent: Asia
- NSN length: 8
- Country code: +968
- International access: 00
- Long-distance: none

Telephone numbers in Oman have a country calling code of +968 and an 8-digit National Significant Number (NSN).

Major telecom operators are Omantel, Ooredoo, Awasr, Vodafone.

== Allocations ==
The 8-digit National Significant Number (NSN) is composed of a 4-digit National Destination Code (NDC), followed by a 4-digit line number.

National Numbering Plan (NNP)
| NDC | Type | Operator(s) (location(s)) |
|---|---|---|
| 22xx | Fixed | Ooredoo, Omantel, Awasr |
| 23xx | Fixed | Omantel (Dhofar, Al Wusta) |
| 24xx | Fixed | Omantel (Muscat) |
| 25xx | Fixed | Omantel (Ad Dakhiliyah, Ash Sharqiyah, Ad Dhahirah) |
| 26xx | Fixed | Omantel (Al Batinah, Musandam) |
| 71xx–72xx | Mobile | Omantel |
| 76xx-77xx | Mobile | Vodafone |
| 78xx–79xx | Mobile | Ooredoo |
| 90xx–91xx | Mobile | Omantel |
| 92xx–93xx | Mobile | Omantel |
| 94xx–95xx | Mobile | Ooredoo |
| 96xx–97xx | Mobile | Ooredoo |
| 98xx–99xx | Mobile | Omantel |

Emergency Numbers

The following numbers are used for emergency services within the Oman:

9999 - Police (Emergency)

999 - Civil Defence/Fire

199 - Marine & Coastal

1442 - Water Emergency

80070008 - Electricity Emergency (Muscat)

80077222 - Municipality
