= Telephone numbers in Chile =

- Country: Chile
- Continent: South America
- Regulator: SUBTEL
- Numbering plan type: Closed
- NSN length: 9
- Country code: 56
- International access: 1xx0
- Long-distance: none

The following telephone numbers in Chile are geographic area codes for all national and international calls terminating in Chile.

== Geographic area codes ==
No geographic area codes exist in Chile; all calls within Chile are considered local calls. All numbers contain 9 digits, and there is no difference between landline, mobile, and VoIP

== Transition to area code deprecation ==
In 2012 and 2013, land lines were renumbered, with an additional digit (2) prepended. The change was rolled out gradually by area code; first in Santiago (Region Metropolitana) and Arica in late 2012, then throughout all remaining regions between March and July 2013.

During that transitional period, when calling a landline, the area code and an extra 2 were added at the beginning of the number, or between the area code and the number. E.g. a formerly seven-digit Santiago number (02) XXX XXXX became 22X XXX XXX, and a formerly six-digit Punta Arenas number (061) YYY YYY became 612 YYY YYY.

The process was completed in September 2016.

== Number portability ==
Number portability is available across the entire telephone network in Chile, so users can freely move from one service provider to another without changing their telephone number, regardless of connection technology, whether landline, mobile, or VoIP. Therefore, a number beginning with "8" or "9" no longer denotes that it is a mobile telephone number.

== Special services ==
There is a group of special numbers for public services, and they are in the format 1XY. The most important ones are:

- 130 Forest fires (Incendios forestales)
- 131 Ambulance (SAMU)
- 132 Firefighters (Bomberos)
- 133 Police Emergency (Emergencias Policiales)
- 134 Investigaciones
- 135 Drug usage prevention hot line (Fono drogas)
- 136 Mountain Rescue (Cuerpo de Socorro Andino)
- 137 Sea Rescue (Rescate Marítimo de la Armada)
- 139 Police Information (Informaciones Policiales)
- 147 Child abuse prevention (Fono niños)
- 149 Family Violence (Fono familia)

== Long-distance carriers ==
In Chile, it is necessary to choose the carrier for international long-distance calls every time, and therefore, to obtain the best rate for any destination. Long-distance carriers have a prefix that must be dialed when calling long distance: XXX + 0 + country code + area + phone

The carrier codes are:

- 110 Claro Chile
- 111 VTR Chile
- 112 Convergia Chile
- 113 Transam
- 114 E-Newcarrier.com Chile
- 115 Empresa de Telecomunicaciones Netonone
- 116 Heilsberg
- 119 Concert Chile
- 120 Globus
- 121 Telefónica del Sur
- 122 Gtd Manquehue
- 123 Entel Larga Distancia
- 124 GSP Chile
- 125 Equant Chile
- 127 Sur Telecomunicaciones
- 151 Astro
- 153 STEL-CHILE S.A
- 154 MiCarrier Telecomunicaciones
- 155 Claro Chile
- 158 Fibersat
- 169 Carrier 169
- 170 Impsat Chile
- 170 Global Crossing
- 171 Claro Chile
- 176 NetChile
- 177 Empresa de Transporte de Señales
- 180 Hogar de Cristo
- 181 Movistar
- 188 Telefónica CTC

== Mobile telephone numbers ==
Mobile telephone numbers do not have a specific starting digit.

== See also ==
- Carrier selection codes in Chile
