= Telephone numbers in Cambodia =

- Location of Cambodia
- Country: Cambodia
- Continent: Asia
- Regulator: Telecommunication Regulator of Cambodia
- Numbering plan type: Closed
- NSN length: 8-9
- Format: 0TT-AXX-XXX/Y
- Country code: +855
- Long-distance: 0

Cambodia's telephone numbering plan is managed by the National Broadcasting and Telecommunications Commission (NBTC) in accordance with International Telecommunication Union's (ITU) recommendation E.164.

== International Calls ==
International Access Codes are also used to select the operator. All are starting with 00, while the third number is identifying the operator's gateway. Currently there are 3 active codes:

1. Gateway 1 (MPTC or Telecom Cambodia) - 001
2. Gateway 2 (Royal Telecam International) - 007
3. VoIP Gateway - 008

All other combinations are reserved for this purpose only.

== Lines ==
To dial a landline all over the country in Cambodia, the format is Area Code + Phone Number. The area code is 3 digits long, followed by a 6- or 7-digit phone number.

Calls made from outside Cambodia must omit the prefix 0. Therefore, to call a landline number in Phnom Penh from other countries, dialing begins with +855 23, followed by 6 or 7 digits.

== Area code ==
Area codes starting with 02

1. Phnom Penh - 023
2. Kandal - 024
3. Kampong Speu - 025
4. Kampong Chhnang - 026

Area codes starting with 03

1. Takeo - 032
2. Kampot - 033
3. Sihanoukville - 034
4. Koh Kong - 035
5. Kep - 036

Area codes starting with 04

1. Kampong Cham - 042
2. Prey Veng - 043
3. Svay Rieng - 044
4. Tbong Khmum - 045

Area codes starting with 05

1. Pursat - 052
2. Battambang - 053
3. Banteay Meanchey - 054
4. Pailin - 055

Area codes starting with 06

1. Kampong Thom - 062
2. Siem Reap - 063
3. Preah Vihear - 064
4. Oddar Meanchey - 065

Area codes starting with 07

1. Kratie - 072
2. Mondulkiri - 073
3. Stung Treng - 074
4. Ratanakiri - 075

Likewise, to call mobile phones from landlines or other mobile phones, domestic dialing begins with a 0 followed by 8 or 9 digits.

Mobile numbers in Cambodia take the form: 0TT-AXX-XXXY.

The first two numbers after the leading 0 or 'TT' in the example above identify the operator. For example, 010 234 567 is an example of a 9-digit mobile number from Smart. 088 234 5678, on the other hand, is an example of a 10-digit mobile number from Metfone.

The 3rd digit after the leading 0 or 'A' in the example above must be between 1 and 9. Normally this value is between 2 and 9, which allows a value of '1' to be used for mobile phones that are roaming in Cambodia. However, some operators, such as Metfone, are using a '1' in this range to extend their number ranges for certain popular prefixes. For example, 012 123 4567 and 092 123 456 are valid mobile numbers in Cambodia.

'X' can take the values 0 to 9, and 'Y' is an optional extra digit that is used by some operators.

Most mobile numbers are 8 digits long (excluding the leading 0); however, some operators are now using 9-digit numbers. 088 234 5678 is an example of a valid 9-digit mobile number.

Calling from outside Cambodia requires the omission of the leading 0. Therefore, to call Cambodian mobile numbers from other countries, dialing begins with +855, followed by the operator prefix without its leading zero and the subscriber digits. Valid international forms include +855 10, +855 15, +855 69, +855 81, +855 88, or full numbers such as +855 92 662 075 and +855 97 234 5678, depending on the carrier and number length.

In addition to mobile services, several VoIP and digital telecommunication providers in Cambodia now operate under prefixes such as 010, 012, and 097, integrating with existing mobile numbering rules. These numbers follow the same domestic and international dialing requirements, ensuring compatibility across Cambodia’s telecommunications network.

As the Telecommunication Regulator of Cambodia (TRC) continues expanding the national numbering plan, operators may introduce new prefixes or modify existing allocations. However, all new ranges remain consistent with the 0TT-AXX-XXX/Y format and conform to the same dialing conventions both within Cambodia and from abroad.

== See also ==
- Telecommunications in Cambodia
