= Telecommunications in Qatar =

Telecommunications in Qatar is the development and infrastructure of communication systems in Qatar, including telephones, broadcasting, and internet services.

== Historical development ==
=== Satellite communications ===
In 1977, Qatar commissioned its first satellite earth station, located about 35 kilometres (22 mi) west of Doha, at a cost of approximately QR 20 million. The facility featured a 270-ton antenna linked to the Indian Ocean satellite, enabling global multi-hop communication. This provided capacity for 30 international telephone circuits, supported 5,000 simultaneous calls, and transmitted two color television channels.

=== Telex and telephone network expansion ===
An automated telex exchange was introduced in 1976, with Doha transmitting about 380,000 messages the year prior. In 1977, a QR 21 million expansion contract was awarded to increase Doha's central telephone exchange capacity to 16,200 lines, with construction of 11 rural exchanges. Once completed, the network was expected to support 30,000 lines nationwide.

== Internet ==
As of 2015, there are two ISPs in Qatar: Ooredoo (formerly Q-Tel) and Vodafone Qatar. There were 563,800 internet users in 2009. The country code (top level domain) is QA. ADSL was launched in 2002 in Qatar by Ooredoo. There were 25,000 ADSL users in 2005.

A 2015 report by the UN Broadband Commission for Sustainable Development ranked Qatar in first place among the developing countries by their respective percentage population using internet. The country also ranked second globally for percentage of households with internet.

=== 5G ===
As of February 2023, 5G coverage in Qatar is at 70%. Ooredoo and Vodafone Qatar, the two major mobile operators in Qatar, have both announced plans to expand their 5G networks to cover the entire country by the end of 2023. The bandwidth of a 5G network in Qatar can be up to 100 MHz in frequency range 1 (FR1: 450 MHz to 6 GHz).

5G is expected to have a major impact on the economy of Qatar. It is expected to boost the country's GDP by $16 billion by 2025 and create over 100,000 jobs.

== Radio ==
In 1998, Qatar had 6 AM radio stations, 5 FM stations, and 1 shortwave station. The number of radios was estimated at approximately 256,000 in 1997.

== Telephones ==
As of 2012, Qatar had approximately 327,000 main telephone lines in use. In the same year, mobile cellular subscriptions reached around 2.6 million.

Qatar maintains a modern telecommunications system centered in its capital Doha. International connectivity is achieved through tropospheric scatter links to Bahrain, microwave radio relay connections to Saudi Arabia and the United Arab Emirates, and submarine cables linking Bahrain and the UAE. Satellite communication is supported by earth stations connected to the Intelsat network in both the Atlantic and Indian Ocean regions, as well as Arabsat.

== Television ==
As of 1997, Qatar operated one primary television broadcast station along with three repeaters. The number of television sets in the country was estimated at approximately 230,000 the same year.

== See also ==
- Telephone numbers in Qatar
