= Telephone numbers in Qatar =

- Country: Qatar
- Continent: Asia
- Numbering plan type: closed
- NSN length: 8
- Country code: 974
- International access: 00
- Long-distance: none

Telephone numbers in Qatar use the country calling code +974 and the international call prefix 00; there is no domestic trunk prefix. A new numbering plan took effect in July 2010, expanding ordinary fixed-line and mobile numbers from seven to eight digits. Under the new plan, fixed-line numbers begin with 4, while mobile numbers begin with 3, 5, 6, or 7. The numbering plan also retains shorter numbers for services including short codes, paging, SMS, freephone and audiotext services, and emergency calls.

== Numbering in Qatar ==
National Significant Numbers (NSN): eight digits

A new numbering plan took effect in 2010.

The minimum number length (excluding the country code) is 3 digits.
The maximum number length (excluding the country code) is 8 digits.

== Allocations in Qatar ==
LIST OF CHANGES
Communicated time and date of change	NSN		Usage of E.164 number	Parallel running		Operator
Communicated time and date of change	Old number	New number	Usage of E.164 number	Begins	Ends	Operator
27.VII.2010 21:01 (UTC)	3 XXXXXX	33 XXXXXX	Mobile telephony services	N/A	N/A	Ooredoo
27.VII.2010 21:01 (UTC)	4 XXXXXX	44 XXXXXX	Fixed telephony services	N/A	N/A	Ooredoo
27.VII.2010 21:01 (UTC)	5 XXXXXX	55 XXXXXX	Mobile telephony services	N/A	N/A	Ooredoo
27.VII.2010 21:01 (UTC)	6 XXXXXX	66 XXXXXX	Mobile telephony services	N/A	N/A	Ooredoo
27.VII.2010 21:01 (UTC)	7 XXXXXX	77 XXXXXX	Mobile telephony services	N/A	N/A	Vodafone Qatar
27.VII.2010 21:01 (UTC)	3 XXXXXX	31 XXXXXX	Mobile telephony services	N/A	N/A	Vodafone Qatar

=== Before changes ===
LIST OF AREA CODES
Leading digits of NSN (National Significant Number)	NSN number length		Usage of E.164 number	Additional information
Leading digits of NSN (National Significant Number)	Maximum length	Minimum length	Usage of E.164 number	Additional information
1	3	3	Non-geographic number – Short Codes	Cannot be dialed from other countries except by bilateral agreement
20	4	4	Non-geographic number – Short Codes	Cannot be dialed from other countries except by bilateral agreement
21	7	7	Non-geographic number – Paging	To be withdrawn when paging service is ceased
22	7	7	Non-geographic number – Paging	To be withdrawn when paging service is ceased
23	7	7	Fixed telephony Services	Ministry of Interior use
261	7	7	Non-geographic number – Paging	To be withdrawn when paging service is ceased
3	7	7	Mobile telephony services	Designated for Ooredoo
4	7	7	Fixed telephony Services	
5	7	7	Mobile telephony services	Designated for Ooredoo
6	7	7	Mobile telephony services	Designated for Ooredoo
7	7	7	Mobile telephony services	Designated for Vodafone Qatar
800	7	7	Non-geographic number – Freephone	
900	7	7	Non-geographic number – Audiotext	
92	5	5	Non-geographic number – SMS services	Designated for Ooredoo
97	5	5	Non-geographic number – SMS services	Designated for Vodafone Qatar
99	3	3	Non-geographic number – Emergency Short Codes	Cannot be dialled from other countries except by bilateral agreement

=== After changes ===
LIST OF AREA CODES
Leading digits of NSN (National Significant Number)	NSN number length		Usage of E.164 number	Additional information
Leading digits of NSN (National Significant Number)	Maximum length	Minimum length	Usage of E.164 number	Additional information
1	3	3	Non-geographic number – Short Codes	Cannot be dialled from other countries except by bilateral agreement
20	4	4	Non-geographic number – Short Codes	Cannot be dialled from other countries except by bilateral agreement
21	7	7	Non-geographic number – Paging	To be withdrawn when paging service is ceased
22	7	7	Non-geographic number – Paging	To be withdrawn when paging service is ceased
23	7	7	Fixed telephony services	Ministry of Interior use
261	7	7	Non-geographic number – Paging	To be withdrawn when paging service is ceased
3	8	8	Mobile telephony services	Prior to the introduction of Number Portability numbers beginning 33 are designated for use by Ooredoo. Other blocks of 100,000 numbers will be allocated to service providers on a ‘first come – first served’ basis.
4	8	8	Fixed telephony Services	Prior to the introduction of Number Portability numbers beginning 44 are designated for use by Ooredoo. Numbers from elsewhere in this range will be allocated to a second or subsequent licensee.
5	8	8	Mobile telephony services	Prior to the introduction of Number Portability numbers beginning 55 are designated for use by Ooredoo.
6	8	8	Mobile telephony services	Prior to the introduction of Number Portability numbers beginning 66 are designated for use by Ooredoo.
7	8	8	Mobile telephony services	Prior to the introduction of Number Portability numbers beginning 77 are designated for use by Vodafone Qatar.
800	7	7	Non-geographic number – Freephone	-
900	7	7	Non-geographic number – Audiotext	-
92	5	5	Non-geographic number – SMS services	Designated for Ooredoo
97	5	5	Non-geographic number – SMS services	Designated for Vodafone Qatar
99	3	3	Non-geographic number – Emergency Short Codes	Cannot be dialled from other countries except by bilateral agreement

== See also ==
- Telecommunications in Qatar
