= Telephone numbers in South Korea =

- Country: South Korea
- Continent: Asia
- Regulator: Ministry of Science and ICT
- Numbering plan type: open
- NSN length: 8, 9, 10
- Format: 0XX-XXX-XXXX; 0XX-XXXX-XXXX
- Country code: +82
- International access: 00
- Long-distance: 0

Telephone numbers in South Korea are organised and assigned under the regulation of the Ministry of Science and ICT, under the Bylaw for the Administration of Telecommunication Numbering.

== Overview ==
- International call out: 00N (where N is the carrier code) followed by the distant country code and telephone number.
- Calling into Korea: +82 XX XXXX YYYY. The leading "0" is dropped when dialling into South Korea from abroad.
- Some 1566/1577/1588 telephone numbers cannot be dialed from abroad.
- Domestic long-distance call: 0NN (where NN is the carrier code) followed by the 0XX area code and XXXX YYYY number. See Domestic long-distance service code and Area code.
- Call to cellular : 01N XXXX YYYY (see Mobile phone number). When phone call is made between unified 010-number subscribers, leading 010 can be dropped (XXXX YYYY).
- Special service call : 0N0 XXXX YYYY (see Special service)

For example;

- Call 02-312-3456 within Seoul: 312–3456
- Call 02-312-3456 from elsewhere: 02–312–3456
- Call 051-212-3456 within Busan: 212–3456
- Call 051-212-3456 from elsewhere: 051-212-3456
- Call 02-312-3456 from abroad: +82-2-312-3456

South Korea uses an open dialing plan with a total length (including 0) of 9 to 11 digits and, within city, subscriber numbers 7 to 8 digits long. Dialing from mobile phones to any type of phone except 010 numbers, the area code must be included.

In 1998, telephone numbers in Seoul starting with 2 and 6 added more digit (02-2XX-YYYY to 02-22XX-YYYY, 02-6XX-YYYY to 02-26XX-YYYY). Before area codes were shortened from 4 digit to 2~3 digit in June 2000, there were 1 digit exchange number (usually "2") with some 2 digit exchange numbers so some phone numbers like 0347-61-XXXX, 0443-2-XXXX or 0525-40-XXXX existed. (now 031-761-XXXX, 043-652-XXXX and 055-340-XXXX)

== Geographic numbers ==
Before June 2000, South Korea used two- to four-digit area codes.

- 02 - Seoul and parts of Gyeonggi-do (Gwacheon, Gwangmyeong and some neighbourhoods of Goyang and Hanam)
- 031 - Gyeonggi-do (except Incheon, Bucheon, Gwacheon, Gwangmyeong and some neighbourhoods of Ansan, Goyang and Hanam)
- 032 - Parts of Gyeonggi-do (Incheon, Bucheon and some insular communities of Ansan)
- 033 - Gangwon-do
- 041 - Chungcheongnam-do (except Daejeon, Sejong and Gyeryong)
- 042 - Chungcheongnam-do (Daejeon and Gyeryong)
- 043 - Chungcheongbuk-do
- 044 - Chungcheongnam-do (Sejong City)
- 049 - Kaesong Industrial Region (No longer available to call)
- 051 - Gyeongsangnam-do (Busan)
- 052 - Gyeongsangnam-do (Ulsan)
- 053 - Gyeongsangbuk-do (Daegu and Gyeongsan)
- 054 - Gyeongsangbuk-do (except Daegu and Gyeongsan)
- 055 - Gyeongsangnam-do (except Busan and Ulsan)
- 061 - Jeollanam-do (except Gwangju)
- 062 - Jeollanam-do (Gwangju)
- 063 - Jeollabuk-do
- 064 - Jeju-do

== Non Geographic numbers ==
=== Mobile prefixes ===
From Jan 1, 2004, all mobile phones changed to 010.

- 010 - Mobile (All South Korea Mobile Phone Companies, from Jan 1, 2004)
- 0100 - Satellite phone (Globalstar)
- 011 - Mobile (SK Telecom), until Dec 31, 2003
- 012 - Machine to machine (Former Beeper)
- 013x - Mobile special net (wireless vessels etc.)
- 014xx - Point-to-Point Protocol Access number
- 015 - Mobile services: Paging services
- 016 - Mobile (KT) until Jun 30, 2003
- 017 - Mobile (SK Telecom), until Dec 31, 2003
- 018 - Mobile (KT), until Jun 30, 2003
- 019 - Mobile (LG U+), until Dec 31, 2004)

=== Services ===
- 030 - UMS
- 050 - Personal number service
- 050x - Anonymous virtual number service
- 060 - Telephone based intelligent service (Premium-rate)
- 070 - Internet phone (VoIP)
- 080 - Toll-free call (some are not free from mobiles)

=== Domestic long-distance carrier codes ===
It is not necessary to dial any carrier prefix before making a domestic long-distance call. These prefixes are needed only when you want to choose a different carrier other than your default long-distance carrier (usually the same company that provides your phoneline).

- 081 - KT
- 082 - LG U+
- 083 - Sejong Telecom
- 084 - SK Broadband
- 085xx - [Domestic long-distance Value Added Service (VAS)]
- 086 - SK Telink
- 087 - (Currently not in use)
- 088 - (Currently not in use)

=== Collect call ===
- 082-17,1677 - uplus (Dacom) Collect call
- 1541 - KT Collect call
- 1677 - Sejong Telecom Collect call
- 1682 - SK Telink Collect call

=== Intelligent Network ===
- 14XXXX
  - 14XX-XX - KT nationwide single number toll-free service
- 15XXXXXX
  - 1544-XXXX - LG Dacom(LG U+) nationwide single number service
  - 1566-XXXX - SK Broadband nationwide single number service
  - 1577-XXXX - KT nationwide single number service
  - 1588-XXXX - KT nationwide single number service
  - 1599-XXXX - SK Telink nationwide single number service
- 16XXXXXX
  - 1661-XXXX - LG U+ nationwide single number service
  - 1688-XXXX - Sejong Telecom nationwide single number service

== Special services numbers ==
- 100 - KT customer centre
- 101 - LG U+ Home Service customer centre
- 106 - SK Broadband customer centre
- 107 - Video relay service
- 109 - Suicide Crisis hotline
- 110 - Governmental Services Centres
- 111 - NIS
- 112 - Police
- 113 - Spy reporting
- Area Code + 114 - Directory assistance (Korea Telephone Information Service)
- 115 - KT Telegram (shutdown December 2023)
- 116 - KT standard time service
- 117 - School Violence Hotline (from 2012, previously: report sexual trafficking of women)
- 118 - Cyber terrorism report
- 119 - Fire brigade, Ambulance
- 120 - Government of Seoul Service Centre
- 121 - Water utility report
- 122 - Coast guard emergency
- 123 - KEPCO electric report
- 125 - Customs
- 126 - National Tax Services
- 128 - Pollution report
- 129 - Provincial Social Welfare Centre (after October 2005)
- 1300 - Postal services
- 1301 - Police Narcotics report
- Area Code + 131 - Weather forecasting
- 132 - Civil Action (Korea Legal Aid Corporation - for contract disputes)
- 1330 - KNTO tourist information (bus·train schedule, Hotel·inn information, free translation service)
- 1331 - Human Rights Board
- 1332 - Finance Board
- 1333 - Transport information
- 1335 - Information communication service centre
- 1336 - Infringement of personal information board
- 1337 - Military Safety Board
- 1338 - Communications service center and report
- 1339 - Emergency medical treatment
- 134 - Tourist information
- 1345 - Korea Immigration Service
- 1350 - Labour Board
- 1355 - National Pension Service
- 1357 - Small and medium enterprise support
- 1365 - Volunteering information
- 1366 - Domestic abuse report
- 1369 - Financial Information Inquiry
- 1377 - Foodbank
- 1379 - Unreasonable infringement of livelihood report
- 1382 - Citizen Registry Confirmation
- 1385 - Business discomfort report and board
- 1388 - Minor mistreatment report
- 1389 - Elderly abuse hotline and board
- 1390 - Election information and infringement hotline
- 1391 - Baby abuse hotline
- 1398 - Child abuse hotline
- 1399 - Unclean grocery report
- 141 - Contact room (KT)
- 182 - Missing child report hotline
- 188 - National Board of Audit and Inspection

== International Access ==
- 001 - KT international call
- 002 - LG U+ international call
- 003xx - International call over Internet Protocol or international special services
  - 00365 - Sejong Telecom international call over Internet Protocol
- 005 - SK Broadband international call (Higher quality than the 5 digit prefix service from the same company)
- 006 - SK Telink international call (Higher quality than the 5 digit prefix service from the same company)
- 007xx - International call over Internet Protocol or international special services
  - 00700 - SK Telink international call over Internet Protocol
  - 00727 - KT international call over Internet Protocol
  - 00766 - SK Broadband international call over Internet Protocol
  - 00794 - Operator Service
- 008 - Sejong Telecom international call (Higher quality than the 5 digit prefix service from the same company)

== See also ==
- Telephone numbers in China
- Telephone numbers in Vietnam
- Telephone numbers in the Philippines
