= Telephone numbers in Kuwait =

- Country: Kuwait
- Continent: Asia
- Numbering plan type: closed
- Country code: +965
- International access: 00
- Long-distance: none

There is no area code in Kuwait. As of 17 October 2008, telephone numbers in Kuwait consist of eight digits (with the exception of '800'-style numbers, which are made up of seven digits). From 17 October 2008 a single digit prefix was added to all fixed and mobile numbers as per the Ministry of Communication's new numbering plan:

- Number 1 was added before all commercial 6 digit numbers (e.g. 800000, 899999, etc.)
- Number 2 was added before all landline numbers
- Number 41 was allocated for Virgin Mobile using STC’s network numbers (year 2022)
- Number 5 was added before all STC numbers
- Number 6 was added before all Ooredoo - Formerly Wataniya Telecom numbers
- Number 9 was added before all Zain numbers
- All the three digit lines remained the same without any additional number e.g. 121, 107, 113, 112, etc.

On June 15, 2013 the Kuwait's Ministry of Communications (MoC) has announced the launch of mobile number portability (MNP), a service that allows mobile users to change their service provider without the need to change their mobile number.

Here are the starting codes of landlines sorted by each area or city:

Area	Landline	Starting Code
Abdalli	2	470
Ahmadi	2	398
Ahmadi & Umm-Alhaiman	2	327, 328
Ardhiyah	2	480, 488, 489
Fahaheel	2	391, 392
Farwaniah	2	471, 472, 473, 474, 476
Free Trade Zone	2	461
Fintas	2	390
Hawalli	2	261, 262, 263, 264, 265, 266
Jaber Al-Ali	2	383, 384
Jabriyah	2	531, 532, 533, 534, 560, 561, 569
Jahra	2	477, 478
Jahra-B	2	455, 456, 457, 458
Jaleeb Al-Shuyoukh	2	431, 433, 434
Manqaf & Shuiba	2	371, 372, 376
Mushrif	2	537, 538, 539
Nuzha & Qadsiya	2	224, 251, 252, 253, 254, 255, 256, 257, 258, 259
Qurain	2	541, 542, 543, 544
Ras Salmiyah	2	571, 572, 573, 574, 575
Rekka	2	394, 396
Sabah Salem	2	551, 552
Safat	2	240, 241, 242, 243, 244, 245, 246, 247, 248, 249
Salmiyah	2	562, 563, 564, 565, 577
Shuwaikh	2	481, 483, 484
South Subahiyah	2	361, 362
Sulaibikhat	2	9427
Sulaibiyah	2	467
Wafra	2	381
Zoor	2	395
