= Carrier selection codes in Chile =

Country code: 56
International call prefix: 1xx0
Trunk prefix: 0

These are the Chilean carrier selection codes.

- Astro 151
- AT&T Chile Long Distance 155
- AT&T Chile Networks 110
- Bell South 181
- Carrier 159 Gtd Long Distance 159
- Carrier 169 169
- Claro Chile 171
- Concert Chile 119
- Convergia Chile 112
- Empresa de Telecomunicaciones Netonone 115
- Empresa de Transporte de Señales 177
- Empresa Nacional de Telecomunicaciones 123
- E-Newcarrier.com Chile 114
- ENTEL 123
- Equant Chile 125
- Globus 120
- GSP Chile 124
- Heilsberg 116
- Impsat Chile 170
- Manquehue 122
- MiCarrier Telecomunicaciones 154
- NetChile 176
- Smartel 165
- STEL-CHILE S.A 153
- Sur Telecomunicaciones 127
- Telefónica CTC 188
- Telefónica del Sur 121
- Transam Comunicaciones 113
- Visat Telecomunicaciones 180
- VTR 111

== See also ==
- Telephone numbers in Chile
