= Telephone numbers in Macau =

- Location of Macau
- Country: Macau
- Continent: Asia
- Regulator: Macao Post and Telecommunications Bureau
- Numbering plan type: Closed
- NSN length: 8
- Format: +853 XXXX XXXX (Mobile phone and fixed-line numbers)
- Country code: +853
- International access: 00
- Long-distance: none

Telephone numbers in Macau are eight-digit numbers. Fixed land line numbers start with 28, while mobile (cellular) phone numbers start with 6. Calls from Macau to mainland China, Hong Kong, Taiwan require international dialling, using the international access code 00 and the country code, although the area code 01 was formerly used for calls to Hong Kong.

The telephone number for emergency services – Police, Fire Service and Ambulance – is 999 for all telephone lines. In addition to 999, two more emergency hotline numbers 110 (mainly for tourists from mainland China) and 112 (mainly for tourists from overseas) can be dialed, however calls made to 110 and 112 are redirected to the 999 call centre. 993 is used for the reporting of serious crimes to Polícia Judiciária (Judiciary Police) for investigation, use this hotline for organised crime reporting, gambling crimes, homicide and drug transport.

== Government regulator ==
Prior to 1999 telephone regulation was under the Direcção dos Serviços de Correios e Telecomunicações (CTT) or Posts, Telegraphs and Telephones under the Secretary for Transport and Public Works.

Since 1999 telephone numbers are under the responsibility of the Direcção dos Serviços de Regulação de Telecomunicações (DSRT) or Bureau of Telecommunications Regulation under the Secretariat for Transport and Public Works.

== Numbering scheme and format ==
- 28xx xxxx - Residential/Business/Government (fixed line)
- 6xxx xxxx - Cellular/Mobile phones
- 8xxx xxxx - Business/Government (fixed line)

== Telecom operators ==
- (Fixed line and mobile) – Companhia Telecomunicações de Macau, S.A.R.L. (CTM)
- (Mobile) – Hutchison Telephone (Macau) Co. Ltd
- (Mobile) – SmarTone Mobile Communications (Macau) Co. Ltd
- (Mobile) – China Telecom (Macau) Co. Ltd

== See also ==
- Telecommunications in Macau
- Telephone numbers in Hong Kong
- Telephone numbering plan
