= Telephone numbers in Hong Kong =

- Location of Hong Kong
- Country: Hong Kong
- Continent: Asia
- Regulator: Communications Authority
- Numbering plan type: Closed
- Format: +852 XXXX XXXX (Mobile phone and fixed-line numbers)
- Country code: +852
- International access: 001
- Long-distance: none

Telephone numbers in Hong Kong are mostly eight-digit. Fixed land line numbers start with 2 or 3, mobile (cellular) phone numbers with 4, 5, 6, 7, 8, or 9, pager numbers with 7 and forwarding service with 8. Since the end of 1989, there have been no area codes within Hong Kong.

The telephone number for emergency services – Police, Fire Services and Ambulance – is 999 for all telephone lines. These numbers can also be used for mobile and other users:

- 992 – fax on fixed line, SMS on mobile phones (for subscribers with disabilities)
- 112 – mobile phones

Some special numbers are three- to five-digit. Some premium rate services, for example for games and adult contents, are 11-digit. Numbers beginning with '1' are usually reserved for carrier/operator services. These services are provided by the individual telephone carrier. In general, these numbers can be used across all carriers:

- Directory services – 1081 (English), 1083 (Cantonese) and 1088 (Mandarin)
- Time and temperature information – 18501 (English), 18503 (Cantonese) and 18508 (Mandarin)

The international call prefix varies depending on IDD provider, however 001 works on all phone lines and uses the IDD service provided by the same carrier as the telephone line that 001 call is dialed from. During the years of telephone monopoly, the International call prefix was 106 (through 1980s) and then 001. Calls from Hong Kong to Macau and mainland China are international, and include that regions' country code:

- Macau +853 xxxx xxxx
- Mainland China +86 (area code) xxxx xxxx

== Present numbering scheme and format ==
The present structure and format of telephone numbers in Hong Kong according to the Hong Kong Telecom Service Numbering Scheme, is as follows (the first digits of the telephone number are used as follows):

- 001 – International long-distance voice service access code
- 002 – International long-distance fax / data service access code
- 003 to 009 – International gateway access code
- 100xxxx to 107xxxx – Inquiry / hotline / operator-assisted service
- 1081 – Directory Services in English
- 1083 – Directory Services in Cantonese
- 1088 – Directory Services in Mandarin
- 109 – Telephone repair
- 112 – Emergency Calls (Mobile Phones only, redirects to 999)
- 115 to 118 – International Routing Network Identification Number
- 12xxxxx – Inquiry / hotline / operator-assisted service
- 133 – Enable the Restricted Caller ID feature
- 1357 – Cancel the "Caller ID Restrictions" feature
- 14 – Network identification number
- 15 to 16 – External telecommunications service access code
- 17xxxxx – Operator-assisted service
- 1801x – PPS (Payment by Phone Service)
- 1803x – PPS (Payment by Phone Service)
- 18060x – PPS (Payment by Phone Service)
- 1808 – International calls search service
- 181 – Helpdesk/Hotline
- 182xxxx – High-traffic telephone line
- 182182 – Employees Retraining Board
- 1823 – Hong Kong SAR Government Efficiency Unit
- 18281 – Tung Wah Group of Hospitals
- 18282 – The Community Chest of Hong Kong
- 18285 – Hospital Authority
- 18286 – Hospital Authority
- 18288 – Caritas Family Services
- 183xxxx – High-traffic telephone line
- 184xx – Hong Kong Jockey Club
- 18501 – Time and temperature information service in English
- 18503 – Time and temperature information service in Cantonese
- 18508 – Time and temperature information service in Mandarin
- 186xxxx – High-traffic telephone lines
- 186000 – Financial Services and the Treasury Bureau of the Government of the Hong Kong SAR
- 186111 – "GovWiFi" help desk
- 186131 – Security Bureau, Government of the Hong Kong SAR
- 186186 – Anti Narcotics Division, Security Bureau, Government of the Hong Kong SAR
- 1868 – Immigration Department of the Government of the Hong Kong SAR (assistance to Hong Kong residents in distress)
- 187xxxx – High traffic telephone lines
- 18713xx – Macau phone gambling (Telebet)
- 1872xxx – Radio station listener calls live program hotline
- 1878xxx – Public service, fundraising, accidental death inquiries
- 1879xxx – Public service, charity hotline
- 1880 – Hong Kong Jockey Club Customer Service
- 1881 to 1889 – Hong Kong Jockey Club phone gambling (Telebet)
- 189 – Disaster Response / Disaster Recovery
- 19 – Test code / routing code
- 200 – Telephone card access code
- 201xxxxx to 206xxxxx – Fixed-line telephone
- 207, 208, 209 – Telephone card access code
- 21xxxxxx to 29xxxxxx – Fixed-line telephone
- 28088000 to 28088099 – Telephone card access code
- 3000xxx – Number Conversion Equipment
- 3001xxxx to 3049xxxx – Non-external telecommunications services
- 305xxxxx to 309xxxxx – External telecommunications services
- 31xxxxxx – Fixed-line telephone
- 34xxxxxx to 39xxxxxx – Fixed-line telephone
- 4xxxxxxxxxxx (except 46x and 47x) – Network number
- 46xxxxxx to 47xxxxxx – Mobile phone number
- 501 to 509 – SMS / Multimedia value-added services
- 51xxxxxx to 57xxxxxx – Mobile phone number
- 58xxxxxx – 'Class 2 Service' such as voice over IP
- 59xxxxxx – Mobile phone number
- 601xxxxx to 699xxxxx – Mobile phone number
- 701xxxxx to 709xxxxx – Mobile phone number
- 71xxxxxx to 73xxxxxx – Pager number
- 800xxxxxx – Toll-free telephone number
- 81xxxxxx to 83xxxxxx – Personal number service
- 84xxxxxx – Mobile phone number
- 900xxxxxxxx – Information service
- 901xxxxx to 989xxxxx (except 911) – Mobile phone number
- 990 to 998 – Emergency services (routing)
- 999 – Emergency number (Police, Fire service and Ambulance)

== Telephone exchanges in Hong Kong ==
- Aberdeen – 6 Wong Chuk Hang Road
- Castle Peak Bay – 138 Castle Peak Road-Castle Peak Bay
- Chai Wan – 13-15 Cheung Lee Street near Kut Shing Street
- Chek Lap Kok – 1 Chun Ming Rd, Chek Lap Kok
- Cheung Chau – 31 Cheung Chau Sports Road
- Cheung Sha – 57A Cheung Sha, Lantau Island
- Clearwater Bay – East Telephone Exchange Tower, 38 Clearwater Bay Road
- Causeway Bay – East Telephone Exchange Tower, 38 Leighton Road, Causeway Bay
- Fanling – 21 Lok Yip Road
- Fo Tan – 32-34 Shan Mei Street
- Fortress Hill – 14 Fortress Hill Road
- Ha Hang – 101 Ting Kok Road
- Ho Man Tin – 43 Sheung Shing St, Ho Man Tin
- Hung Hom – 140 Gillies Avenue North
- Kennedy Town – 14 Smithfield Road, Sai Wan
- Kowloon City – 28 Lung Kong Road
- Kowloon Tong – 1 Kam Shing Road
- Kwai Chung – Kwok Shui Road near Fu Uk Road
- Kwai Shing – 298 Kwai Shing Circuit, Kwai Chung
- Kwun Tong – 408 Kwun Tong Road
- Lai Chi Kok – 2 Yuet Lun Street
- Lamma Island – 70A Po Wah Yuen, Lamma Island
- Lau Fau Shan – 13 Lau Fau Shan Road
- Ma On Shan – 20 On Shing Street
- Mong Kok – 37 Bute Street, Mong Kok, Kowloon
- Ngau Tam Mei – 388 Castle Peak Road-Tam Mi
- Ngau Tau Kok – 7 Siu Yip St, Kowloon Bay
- North Point – 511 King's Road
- Peng Chau – 5 Nam Shan Road, Peng Chau
- Ping Che – 2 Ping Che Road
- Repulse Bay – 6 beach road, Repulse Bay
- Sai Kung – 66 Man Nin Street
- Sha Tin – 14-16 Man Lai Road, Tai Wai
- Sham Shui Po – 330 Cheung Sha Wan Road
- Sham Tseng – 44 Castle Peak Road, Sham Tseng
- Shau Kei Wan – 17 Sun Sing Street
- Shek Kip Mei – 41 Wai Chi Street
- Shek O – 185 Shek O Village
- Sheung Shui – 88-98 Jockey Club Road
- Sheung Wan – West Exchange Tower, 322 Des Voeux Road Central, Sheung Wan
- Siu Lek Yuen – 18 Siu Lek Yuen Road
- Stanley – 36 Stanley Village Road
- Tai Hing – 6 Shek Pai Tau Rd, Tuen Mun
- Tai Kok Tsui – 663 Shanghai Street, Mong Kok
- Tai Po – 30 Kwong Fuk Square, Tai Po
- Tai Po – 5 On Po Lane, Tai Po
- Tin Shui Wai – 8 Tin Pak Rd, Tin Shui Wai
- Tsing Yi – 12 Chung Mei Rd, Tsing Yi
- Tsuen Wan – 303 Castle Peak Road, Tsuen Wan
- Tseung Kwan O – 22 Wan Lung Road, Tseung Kwan O
- Tuen Mun – 1 Hing On Lane
- Tung Chung – 12 Cheung Tung Rd, Tung Chung
- Wan Chai – 44-46 Wood Road
- Wan Chai – Lockhart Telephone Exchange Tower, 3 Hennessy Road, Wan Chai
- Wong Tai Sin – 19 Muk Lun Street, Wong Tai Sin
- Yau Ma Tei – 524A Nathan Road
- Yau Tong – 6 Tseung Kwan O Road, Lam Tin
- Yuen Long – 170-184 Kau Yuk Road, Yuen Long

== Historical numbering scheme and area codes ==
=== 1970s ===
In the 1970s, area codes were assigned with the following pattern:

- 3 Kowloon, New Kowloon, Ha Kwai Chung and Sai Kung
- 5 Hong Kong Island and Outlying Islands
- 12 New Territories

There was no standard trunk prefix like '0' – only the area code and phone number were dialed when calling from one area code to another. Thus the Kowloon number xxx-xxx would have been dialed as follows:

- xxx-xxx – from within Kowloon
- 3 xxx-xxx – from Hong Kong Island or New Territories
- +852 3 xxx-xxx – from the rest of the world

=== 1980s ===
In the mid-1980s, 6-digit numbers starting with '0' became 7-digit numbers starting with '71', making way for subsequent change of the New Territories prefix from '12' to '0'.

- 0xxxxx became 71xxxxx

Fixed-line phone numbers were either six- or seven-digit in the 1980s. Area codes were assigned with the following patterns.

- 3 Kowloon, New Kowloon, Ha Kwai Chung and Sai Kung
- 5 Hong Kong Island and Outlying Islands
- 0 New Territories

Cellular phone numbers are all eight-digit starting with '9'.

=== Easy Dialling Day ===
On 30 December 1989, area codes were abolished. Six-digit numbers in the New Territories were changed to replace the initial 8 with 46, followed by five digits; area codes for six-digit numbers in the other areas became part of subscriber's numbers. Area codes for seven-digit numbers were simply removed. Some six-digit numbers had the first digit changed to two digits to make a seven-digit number.

- (3) xxx xxx became 3xx xxxx
- (3) 7xx xxxx became 7xx xxxx
- (5) xxx xxx became 5xx xxxx
- (5) Nxx xxxx became Nxx xxxx (N = 8 or 9)
- (0) 8xx xxx became 46x xxxx
- (0) Nxx xxxx became Nxx xxxx (N = 4 or 6)

=== 1990s ===
On January 1, 1995, a '2' was prefixed to all fixed line (land line) numbers which are now eight-digit. A '7' was prefixed to existing pager service numbers.

- xxx xxxx became 2xxx xxxx
- 11xx xxx became 711xx xxx
- 11xx xxxxx became 7xx xxxxx
- 9xxx xxxx remain unchanged

=== Since 2000s ===
Before the introduction of portable fixed line numbers, numbers were assigned in a pattern akin to districts. For example, in addition to the existing 3, 5 and 0 prefixes, a 4 prefix was used for Tuen Mun and Yuen Long, 6 for Tai Po and Sha Tin, and 8 for Hong Kong Island.

Numbers starting with '3' were introduced when '2' for fixed lines started running out. Cell phone numbers remain eight-digit. The number '6' started to be used when numbers started with '9' were running out. In May 2008, cellular phone numbers with '5' as the beginning were also introduced.

Due to numerous phone scams spoofing local telephone numbers, calls started from outside Hong Kong using a local number now show the Hong Kong prefix +852 before the phone numbers in Caller ID.

== See also ==
- Communications in Hong Kong
- Telecommunications (Registration of SIM Cards) Regulation
- Telephone numbers in Macau
- Telephone numbering plan
