= Telephone numbers in Singapore =

- Location of Singapore
- Country: Singapore
- Continent: Asia
- Regulator: Info-communications Media Development Authority
- Numbering plan type: Closed
- NSN length: 8
- Format: +65 XXXX XXXX
- Country code: +65
- International access: 000, 001, 002, 008, 011, 013, 018, 019, 020, and 021
- Long-distance: none (Previously 0 via Malaysia until 1995)

Telephone numbers in Singapore, also known as the National Numbering Plan, are regulated by the Info-communications Media Development Authority (IMDA). Due to the small geographical size of Singapore, there are no area or trunk codes; all numbers belong to one numbering area, and thus come in the same 8-digit format. Numbers are categorised based on the first digit, thus providing ten possible categories, of which six are currently in use and the remaining four reserved for future usage.

== History ==
Until 1985, subscribers' telephone numbers in Singapore were five and six digits. Five digits were introduced in 1960s, whereas 5-digit and 6-digit phone numbers were introduced in 1960s as fixed lines grew, but in that year, these changed to seven digits as the introduction of new towns arose (Tampines, Jurong East, Bukit Batok, Yishun and Hougang) and a large number of new numbers were required. Rationalisation was based on geographical locale over the 12 years.

On 1 September 1995, the digit '9' was added to the front of mobile and pager numbers, making numbers eight digits, and on 1 March 2002, the digit '6' was added to the front of existing fixed line telephone numbers. The migration to the 8-digit numbering plan was planned to be on 2002, ahead of 2004 deadline. Full telecommunication liberalisation in April 2000 led to rapid growth in the market, resulting in increased demand in numbers. The implementation of 8-digit numbering plan, ensured that there would be a sufficient number resource pool to cater to the expanded telecommunication services. Preparation work started in 1999, as an effective approach had to be worked out for the implementation, with minimum service disruption and inconvenience to customers. The public telecommunication service providers - SingTel and StarHub, implemented the 8-digit numbering plan and ensure smooth service continuity for their customers after the migration. There was a parallel run of 7-digit and 8-digit numbers from 1 March 2002 to 31 March 2002. From 1 April 2002 to 30 June 2002, those calling the 7-digit numbers would hear the number change announced, prompting them to add the digit "6" to the old number, after which the call would be disconnected. After 30 June, callers would hear the announcement that the number was unavailable.

In March 2004, in response to the growing mobile phone numbering in Singapore, 8-digit mobile phone numbers starting with the digit "8" were introduced.

In 2005, Infocomm Development Authority, the regulating authority at that time, introduced a policy framework which would govern IP telephony services, while introducing 8-digit phone numbers starting with the digit '3' for such services at the same time.

=== Calls to Malaysia and Indonesian border towns ===
Until 1995, calls to Malaysia from Singapore were direct and similar to domestic phone calls, with only the area code for fixed line or Malaysian mobile phone code and number being required, hence 03 for Kuala Lumpur fixed line or 019 for Celcom mobile carrier were dialed instead of +60 3 and +60 19. In 1995, owing to the divergence of the two countries' numbering plans, the Subscriber Trunk Dialling prefix 020 was adopted. For example, in order to call a number in Kuala Lumpur, 020 is dialled first, followed by the area code 3 (excluding the leading zero), then the subscriber number.

Similarly, calls to Batam, Samarinda, Pekanbaru and Tanjung Pinang in Indonesia require only the code 011, followed by the area code (minus '0') and the subscriber's number, hence to call a number in Batam from Singapore, a subscriber would dial 011 778 xxx xxx, instead of the international code +62 778. Calls to the rest of Indonesia, including those to mobile phones, require international dialling.

Following the liberalization of the telecommunications industry, new carriers are assigned new carrier-specific codes for international and regional trunk call services. The codes 020 and 011 are assigned to the incumbent carrier SingTel. The other two major carriers, M1 and StarHub, do not offer any special dialling arrangements for calling to Malaysia and Indonesia, instead requiring full international dialling, the same as calling other countries.

== Numbering scheme and format ==
- x denotes 0 to 9
- y denotes 0 to 8 only

=== Number ranges ===
3xxx xxxx - Business and Corporate IP Telephony Services or VOIP line numbers.

6xxx xxxx - Public Switched Telephone Network (PSTN) and Residential IP Telephony Services

8xxx xxxx - Mobile, Data Services, New Numbers and Prepaid Numbers

9yxx xxxx - Mobile, Data Services and Prepaid Numbers (Pagers Until May 2012)

=== Special service numbers ===
800 xxx xxxx - Toll-free international services

1800 xxx xxxx - Toll-free domestic services (Free if calling from a landline. Airtime charges apply if calling from a mobile line. '1800' is alias for '6'; as such these services can be reached as toll numbers, including from outside of Singapore, by replacing '1800 xxx xxxx' with '+65 6xxx xxxx'.)

1900 xxx xxxx - Premium rate services

=== Short codes ===
0xx - International access codes

13xx - Voicemails

16xx - Service providers' customer services

1777 - Non-emergency ambulance

1799 - ScamShield Helpline

18xx - International calling card access numbers

993 - Ministry of Health's special ambulance service - previously used for suspected cases of H1N1, SARS and COVID-19

995 - Singapore Civil Defence Force - Fire or Emergency Ambulance

999 - Police

70995 - Emergency SMS (For immediate fire/ambulance assistance if it is not safe to talk)

70999 - Emergency SMS (For immediate police assistance if it is not safe to talk)

== Telephone exchanges ==
This is the list of telephone exchanges in Singapore. They also share the telephone exchanges with OpenNet locations, cable TV and '6'-regoed phone lines (each from SingTel and StarHub).

- Ang Mo Kio Telephone Exchange
- Ayer Rajah Telephone Exchange - August 1977
- Bedok Telephone Exchange - 20 February 1973
- Bukit Panjang Telephone Exchange
- Central Telephone Exchange - 14 July 1980
- Changi Telephone Exchange
- Geylang Telephone Exchange
- Hougang Telephone Exchange
- Jurong Telephone Exchange
- Jurong East Telephone Exchange
- Jurong West Telephone Exchange
- Lavender Telephone Exchange - 13 March 1973
- North Telephone Exchange (Thomson)
- Old Choa Chu Kang Telephone Exchange - 10 November 2023
- Orchard Telephone Exchange
- Pasir Ris Telephone Exchange - 14 October 1991
- Paya Lebar Telephone Exchange - 8 October 1960
- Queenstown Telephone Exchange - 7 July 1957
- Seletar Telephone Exchange
- Tampines Telephone Exchange
- Tanjong Katong Telephone Exchange - 11 July 1957
- Tanjong Pagar Telephone Exchange
- Telok Blangah Telephone Exchange
- Tuas Telephone Exchange
- Woodlands Telephone Exchange

=== Satellite stations ===
- Bukit Timah Satellite Station
- Seletar Satellite Station
- Sentosa Satellite Station

=== Former telephone exchanges ===
- Changi (Upper Changi Road) - Built in October 1958
- City (George Street) - Built in July 1959
- Clementi
- Fort Canning
- Lim Chu Kang (Lorong Tukol)
- Nee Soon (Upper Thomson Road)
- Old Central - Built in 1917
- Sembawang (Jalan Ulu Sembawang, demolished in 2005)
- Tiong Bahru

== International direct dialing ==
The generic international call prefix when making an international call is 000, which all telecommunications service providers are required to share. However, the code is not well known as carrier-specific access codes are generally used, such as 001 for SingTel, 002 for M1 and 008 for StarHub. On a mobile phone, a plus sign (+) can be keyed in as a substitute for the prefix.

== VoIP services ==
VoIP services, such as Zone 1511, use prefixes in the 15xx range. For example, to call a number in London using Zone 1511, a subscriber would dial 1511 44 20 xxxx xxxx. Access codes in the 0xx range (for example, 018 - StarHub's VoIP services or 019 - SingTel's VoIP services) indicate a Tier 1 VoIP provider. Access codes like 1xxx (for example, 1511) are indicative of a Tier 2 VoIP provider.
