= Telephone numbers in Taiwan =

Telephone numbers in Republic of China (Taiwan)
- Territories controlled by the Republic of China in green
- Country: Republic of China (Taiwan)
- Continent: Asia
- Regulator: NCC
- Numbering plan type: open
- Country code: +886
- International access: 002, 005, 006, 007, 009
- Long-distance: 0

Telephone area codes in Taiwan

== Area code ==
The emergency numbers in Taiwan are 110 (police) and 119 (fire and ambulance services).

When making an inter-area long-distance call from within Taiwan, a long-distance prefix "0" is required. If calls are made from within the same area code, then the area code does not need to be included. Inter-area calls are defined as long-distance phone calls even when the two numbers have the same prefix.

If calls are made from outside Taiwan, the "0" of the area code prefix is omitted.

The following table of area codes includes this "0" prefix.

Prefix	Area	Divisions	Digits	Notes
02	Taipei	Taipei City, New Taipei City, Keelung City	8	Numbers that start with 2,3 and 8 are assigned to Chunghwa Telecom (ILEC-the main operator), Number ranges that start with 4, 5, 6 and 7 are competitive fixed network operators, such as Taiwan Fixed Network (TFN), New Century InfoComm LTD (NCIC), and Asia Pacific Telecom (APT), as Chunghwa Telecom no longer holds a monopoly in this market area.
03	Taoyuan	Taoyuan City	7	starts with 2* (minor), 3 (Taoyuan District), 4* (Zhongli) Numbers start with ranges 21, 22, 28 are assigned to (CHT), Numbers start with 25 (APT), 26 (TFN), and 27 (NCIC) belong to competitive local operators. All numbers starting with 3 belong to Chunghwa Telecom, as CHT holds a monopoly in Taoyuan District. Numbers that start with 4 are assigned to Chunghwa Telecom except ranges 405 (APT), 406 (TFN), and 449 (NCIC).
03	Hsinchu	Hsinchu City, Hsinchu County	7	starts with 5 (major), 6* (minor) Numbers start with 6 are assigned to CHT except 60 (APT), 61 (TFN), 62 (NCIC).
03	Hualien	Hualien County	7	starts with 8* Number ranges that start with 800, 805, and 890 belong to APT, TFN, and NCIC respectively. All other numbers that start with 8 are assigned to the dominant fixed-line operator (Chunghwa Telecom).
03	Yilan	Yilan County	7	starts with 9 All number ranges are assigned to Chunghwa Telecom except numbers starting with 900 (APT), 905-906 (TFN), 910 (NCIC).
037	Miaoli	Miaoli County	6	All numbers belong to Chunghwa Telecom except these numbers starting with: 24-TFN 28-APT 77-NCIC
04	Taichung	Taichung City	8	starts with 22-24 & 270 (urban area), 25 (Fengyuan, including Zhuolan, Miaoli), 26 (Dajia and Shalu), 3 (minor)- Note according to Chinese Wikipedia these numbers have been merged with several prefixes resulting in numbers assigned to be from one city code. All numbers are with Chunghwa Telecom except the following ranges: (Competitive Local Operators) 3500-3509 APT 3600-3611 TFN 3700-3707 NCIC 3900–3903,3920-3922 VeeTime Corp
04	Changhua	Changhua County	7	starts with 7 (Changhua City), 8 (Yuanlin) (CHT-Landlines) Except the following listed below. 700-704 TFN 705-709 NCIC 800-804 APT
049	Nantou	Nantou County	7	starts with 2, (CHT landlines) including Fenyuan, Changhua, 5-7 (Competitive Local Operators) 500 APT 600 TFN 700 NCIC
05	Chiayi	Chiayi City, Chiayi County	7	starts with 2 (Chiayi City and Minxiong), 3 (Dongshi) Except ranges listed below. (Competitive Local Operators) 300 APT 310 TFN 320 NCIC
05	Yunlin	Yunlin County	7	starts with 5 (Douliu), 6 (Huwei), 7 (Beigang) Except those ranges listed below: According to Chinese Wikipedia these prefixes could have been merged. (Competitive Local Operators) 700 TFN 750 APT 770 NCIC
06	Tainan	Tainan City	7	starts with 2 & 3 (urban area), 5 (Xinhua and Shanhua), 6 (Xinying), 7 (Jiali) All numbers belong to Chunghwa Telecom. Range exceptions: (Competitive Local Operators) 510-513 APT 600-602 TFN 700-703 NCIC
06	Penghu	Penghu County	7	starts with 9 (CHT Landlines) Except ranges: 950 APT 960 TFN 970 NCIC
07	Kaohsiung	Kaohsiung City	7	including Pratas Island and the Spratly Islands (Note: 070 prefix is used for VOIP phone services, these numbers are 8 digits instead of 7). Except ranges listed as Competitive Local Operators: 860–862,96X TFN 95X APT 97X NCIC All other ranges belong to Chunghwa Telecom.
08	Pingtung	Pingtung County	7	starts with 7 (Pingtung City and Chaozhou), 8 (Donggang and Hengchun) (Competitive Local Operators) 800-801 APT 810 TFN 820-821 NCIC
082	Kinmen	Kinmen County	6	mainly starts with 3 (CHT Landlines) Exceptions are local competitive operators that start with ranges 50X APT 70X NCIC 80X TFN
0826	Wuqiu	Wuqiu Township	5	starts with 6 All numbers belong to Chunghwa Telecom in this area.
0836	Matsu	Lienchiang County	5	starts with 2 (Nangan), 5(Beigan), 7 (Dongyin), 8 (Juguang) Chunghwa Telecom Landlines. Numbers start with 6 and 9 are competitive local operators. 6 APT 9 TFN
089	Taitung	Taitung County	6	Numbers belonging to Chunghwa Telecom except starting with: 61X TFN 71X NCIC 96X APT

== Mobile phones ==
Taiwan mobile phone numbers begin in three digits ranging 090~098 with a total length of 10 digits: 09X followed by 7 digits (e.g. 092 1234567). When calling a Taiwan landline phone number using a local Taiwan mobile phone, the 0 prefix for the area code must be included (e.g. area code with 0 prefix included + 8 digit landline number). When calling a Taiwan mobile phone number from outside of Taiwan, the 0 of 09X is omitted (e.g. +8861804672522).

Format: (01804672522

Mobile Phones with 090 range is mostly used for wireless data services (M2M).

== Toll-free and premium rate ==
Toll-free numbers begin with the prefix 0800 and 0809.

Numbers in the 020x prefix are used for value-added services:

Prefix	Purpose
0201	Voting services
0203	Bulk announcements
0204	Premium rate numbers

== International dialling ==
International dialling from Taiwan follows the following pattern:

Carrier selection code – Country calling code – Area code (if required, usually for landlines) – Subscriber number

Carrier selection codes, which direct the call via one of several providers, are as follows:

- 002 – Chunghwa Telecom
- 005 – Asia Pacific Telecom
- 006 – Taiwan Mobile
- 007 – Far EasTone
- 009 – Chunghwa Telecom

== Country calling code ==
The international dialling code for making calls to Taiwan, and the other islands is 886.

International dialling codes were assigned by the International Telecommunication Union (ITU), an agency of the United Nations, to its member states and their dependencies in the 1960s. Despite the Republic of China on Taiwan still holding the Chinese seat in the UN, and hence the ITU, other member states declared that "the only representatives of the people of China are the delegates to the ITU and its permanent organs appointed by the Central Government of the People's Republic of China". This led to the People's Republic of China being assigned the country code 86. Consequently, in the early 1970s, Taiwan had to be unofficially assigned a separate code, 886, although there was pressure from China to change this to 866. This had to be listed as "reserved", but in 2006, the code was formally allocated to "Taiwan, China".
